= Ficus matiziana =

Conservation status
- Least Concern (IUCN 3.1)

Scientific classification
- Kingdom: Plantae
- Clade: Tracheophytes
- Clade: Angiosperms
- Clade: Eudicots
- Clade: Rosids
- Order: Rosales
- Family: Moraceae
- Genus: Ficus
- Species: F. matiziana

Binomial name
- Ficus matiziana Dugand

Synonyms
- Ficus bullenei I.M.Johnst.; Ficus loretoyacuensis Dugand

Species of flowering plant

Ficus matiziana is a species of flowering plant in the family Moraceae. It is a tree native to Bolivia, northern and west-central Brazil, Colombia, southern Costa Rica, Ecuador, Panama, Peru, and Venezuela.

The species was first described in 1946 by Armando Dugand.
