= Ficus hebetifolia =

Conservation status
- Least Concern (IUCN 3.1)

Scientific classification
- Kingdom: Plantae
- Clade: Tracheophytes
- Clade: Angiosperms
- Clade: Eudicots
- Clade: Rosids
- Order: Rosales
- Family: Moraceae
- Genus: Ficus
- Species: F. hebetifolia

Binomial name
- Ficus hebetifolia Dugand

Species of flowering plant

Ficus hebetifolia is a species of flowering plant in the family Moraceae. It is a tree native to northern Brazil, Colombia, French Guiana, Peru, and Venezuela. It grows in lowland and montane Amazon rainforest up to 1,900 meters elevation.

The species was described by Armando Dugand in 1942.
