= Ficus castellviana =

Conservation status
- Least Concern (IUCN 3.1)

Scientific classification
- Kingdom: Plantae
- Clade: Tracheophytes
- Clade: Angiosperms
- Clade: Eudicots
- Clade: Rosids
- Order: Rosales
- Family: Moraceae
- Genus: Ficus
- Subgenus: F. subg. Urostigma
- Species: F. castellviana

Binomial name
- Ficus castellviana Dugand

Species of fig from South America

Ficus castellviana is a species of plant in the family Moraceae. It is found in Bolivia, Brazil, Colombia, and Peru.
