= Ficus panurensis =

Conservation status
- Least Concern (IUCN 3.1)

Scientific classification
- Kingdom: Plantae
- Clade: Tracheophytes
- Clade: Angiosperms
- Clade: Eudicots
- Clade: Rosids
- Order: Rosales
- Family: Moraceae
- Genus: Ficus
- Species: F. panurensis

Binomial name
- Ficus panurensis Standl.

Synonyms
- Ficus arctocarpa Standl.; Ficus maguirei Standl.

Species of flowering plant

Ficus panurensis is a species of flowering plant in the family Moraceae. It is a tree native to northern Brazil, the Guianas, northern Peru, and Venezuela.

The species was first described by Paul Carpenter Standley in 1937.
