= Ficus trigona =

Conservation status
- Least Concern (IUCN 3.1)

Scientific classification
- Kingdom: Plantae
- Clade: Tracheophytes
- Clade: Angiosperms
- Clade: Eudicots
- Clade: Rosids
- Order: Rosales
- Family: Moraceae
- Genus: Ficus
- Species: F. trigona

Binomial name
- Ficus trigona L.f.

Synonyms
- Ficus alvareziana Dugand; Ficus coombsii Warb.; Ficus cotoneaster Warb. ex Ule; Ficus euomphala (Miq.) Miq.; Ficus fagifolia (Miq.) Miq.; Ficus fanshawei Standl.; Ficus plicato-ostiolata Pittier; Ficus regularis Standl.; Ficus vulpina Benoist; Ficus weberbaueri Standl.; Oluntos trigona (L.f.) Raf.; Urostigma euomphalum Miq.; Urostigma fagifolium Miq.; Urostigma trigonum (L.f.) Miq.

Species of fig

Ficus trigona is a species of tree in the family Moraceae. It is native to tropical South America, where it is found in Bolivia, Brazil, Colombia, Ecuador, the Guianas, Peru, and Venezuela. It grows in lowland tropical moist forests.

== Characteristics ==
Ficus trigona typically starts life as an epiphyte on another tree. Eventually the plant will send roots to the ground in order to seek more nutrients, however, these roots may completely encircle and constrict the host tree reducing the tree's ability to grow. This in addition to the vigorous growth of the Ficus trigona may lead to the plant outcompeteing and killing the host tree.

At maturity the tree can grow up to 35 metres tall, with a trunk width of up to 75 cm. It is usually found in or near swamps, on the sides of rivers, or on coastal plains.

The tree is sometimes sought for use as medicine, but seldom has any other use.
