= Ficus luschnathiana =

Conservation status
- Least Concern (IUCN 3.1)

Scientific classification
- Kingdom: Plantae
- Clade: Tracheophytes
- Clade: Angiosperms
- Clade: Eudicots
- Clade: Rosids
- Order: Rosales
- Family: Moraceae
- Genus: Ficus
- Species: F. luschnathiana

Binomial name
- Ficus luschnathiana (Miq.) Miq.

Synonyms
- Ficus diabolica Herter; Ficus diabolica f. laurina Herter; Ficus diabolica f. maior Herter; Ficus diabolica f. minor Herter; Ficus erubescens Warb. ex Glaz.; Ficus horquetensis Chodat; Ficus ibapophy Orb. ex Hauman & Irigoyen; Ficus monckii Hassl.; Ficus monckii var. san-martinianus Parodi; Ficus monckii f. subcuneata Hassl.; Ficus speciosa Rojas Acosta; Urostigma luschnathianum Miq. (1853) (basionym)

Species of flowering plant

Ficus luschnathiana is a species of flowering plant in the family Moraceae. It is a tree native to northeastern Argentina, eastern, southern, and west-central Brazil, Paraguay, and Uruguay.

The species was first described as Urostigma luschnathianum by Friedrich Anton Wilhelm Miquel in 1853. In 1867 Miquel placed the species in genus Ficus as F. luschnathiana.
