= Ficus mathewsii =

Conservation status
- Least Concern (IUCN 3.1)

Scientific classification
- Kingdom: Plantae
- Clade: Tracheophytes
- Clade: Angiosperms
- Clade: Eudicots
- Clade: Rosids
- Order: Rosales
- Family: Moraceae
- Genus: Ficus
- Species: F. mathewsii

Binomial name
- Ficus mathewsii (Miq.) Miq.

Synonyms
- Ficus aureobrunnea Pittier; Ficus corpulenta Pittier; Ficus gleasonii Standl.; Ficus katherinae A.D.Hawkes; Ficus leiophylla C.C.Berg; Ficus maroana Pittier; Ficus martini Miq.; Ficus metensis Dugand; Ficus niceforoi Dugand; Ficus oblanceolata Rusby; Ficus obovata Pittier; Ficus sprucei Standl.; Ficus vaupesana Dugand; Urostigma mathewsii Miq. (1847) (basionym)

Species of fig

Ficus mathewsii is a species of plant in the family Moraceae. It is native to tropical South America, including in northern and eastern Brazil, Bolivia, Colombia, Ecuador, the Guianas, Peru, and Venezuela.

The species was first described as Urostigma mathewsii by Friedrich Anton Wilhelm Miquel in 1847. In 1867 Miquel placed the species in genus Ficus as F. mathewsii.
