= Ficus schippii =

Conservation status
- Least Concern (IUCN 2.3)

Scientific classification
- Kingdom: Plantae
- Clade: Tracheophytes
- Clade: Angiosperms
- Clade: Eudicots
- Clade: Rosids
- Order: Rosales
- Family: Moraceae
- Genus: Ficus
- Species: F. schippii

Binomial name
- Ficus schippii Standl.

Synonyms
- Ficus herthae Diels; Ficus meistosyce Standl. & L.O.Williams; Ficus microclada Dugand

Species of fig

Ficus schippii is a species of flowering plant in the family Moraceae. It is a hemiepiphytic shrub or tree native to Central America (Belize, Nicaragua, Costa Rica, and Panama) and tropical South America (Bolivia, northern and west-central Brazil, Colombia, Ecuador, Peru, and Venezuela).

The species was first described by Paul Carpenter Standley in 1930.
