= Ficus salomonensis =

Roroketa

Scientific classification
- Kingdom: Plantae
- Clade: Tracheophytes
- Clade: Angiosperms
- Clade: Eudicots
- Clade: Rosids
- Order: Rosales
- Family: Moraceae
- Genus: Ficus
- Species: F. salomonensis

Binomial name
- Ficus salomonensis Rech. 1912

Species of Ficus

Ficus salomonensis (Family Moraceae; and commonly called "Roroketa") of the Solomon Islands is a palm-like sparingly branching mesocaul rainforest tree to about 26 feet (eight meters) in height. The main trunk and each branch of juvenile trees is topped by a rosette of huge leaves which are entire (undivided and unlobed) oblanceolate in form and up to 200 centimeters (6.5 feet) in length by 60 cm (2 feet) wide The adult trees have leaves up to 80 centimeters (32 inches) long by 30 cm (12 inches) in width. The fruit (syconia) are borne in clusters mostly on the trunk (cauliflory). It was discovered in 1912 but was not seen again until 1961 when it was re-discovered by E. J. H. Corner.
