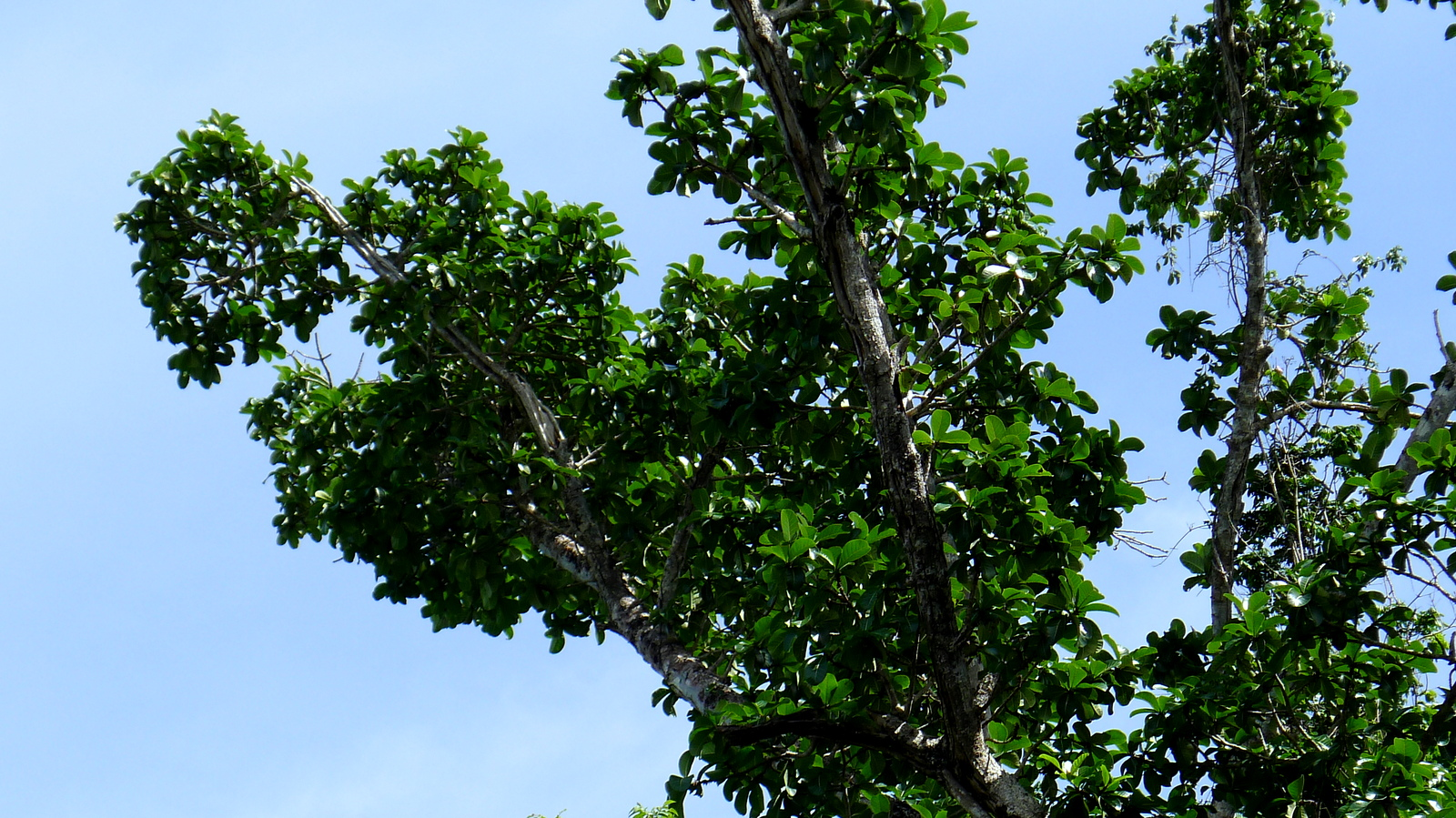

Conservation status
- Near Threatened (IUCN 3.1)

Scientific classification
- Kingdom: Plantae
- Clade: Embryophytes
- Clade: Tracheophytes
- Clade: Angiosperms
- Clade: Eudicots
- Clade: Rosids
- Order: Rosales
- Family: Moraceae
- Genus: Ficus
- Subgenus: F. subg. Urostigma
- Species: F. cyclophylla

Binomial name
- Ficus cyclophylla (Miq.) Miq. (1867)

Synonyms
- Urostigma cyclophyllum Miq.

= Ficus cyclophylla =

Species of fig tree from Brazil

Ficus cyclophylla is a species of fig tree in the family Moraceae, native to Brazil.

It is endemic to the Atlantic Forest ecoregion of Southeast Brazil, in the states of Maranhão, Minas Gerais, Paraíba, Pernambuco, Rio de Janeiro, and Rondônia. It is also found on the Fernando de Noronha islands of Pernambuco.

The IUCN Red List assesses the species as Near Threatened, threatened by habitat loss.

== See also ==
- Flora of the Atlantic Forest biome
