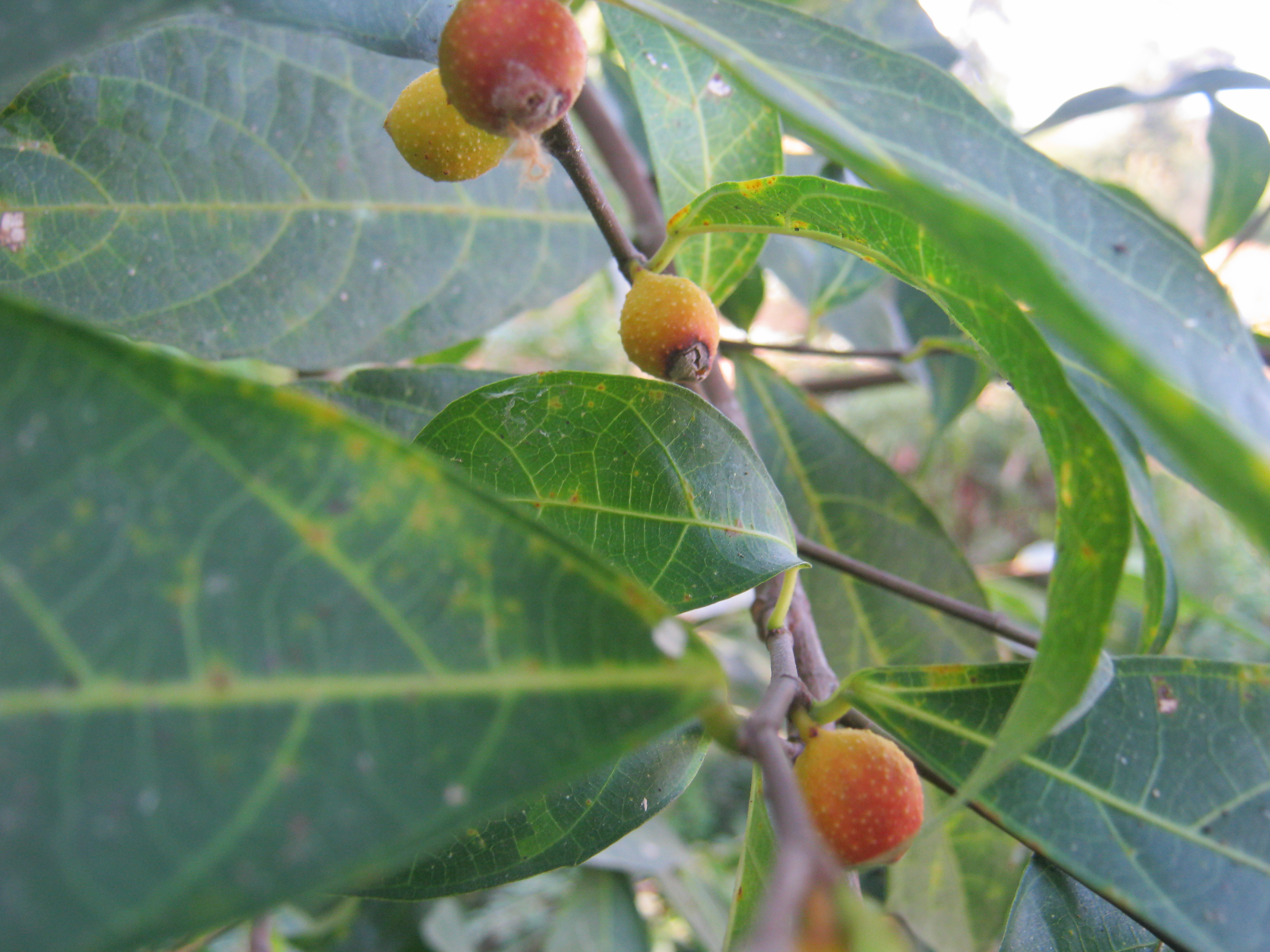
- Ficus sarmentosa fruits found in Panchkhal valley Nepal

Scientific classification
- Kingdom: Plantae
- Clade: Tracheophytes
- Clade: Angiosperms
- Clade: Eudicots
- Clade: Rosids
- Order: Rosales
- Family: Moraceae
- Genus: Ficus
- Subgenus: F. subg. Synoecia
- Species: F. sarmentosa

Binomial name
- Ficus sarmentosa Buch.-Ham. ex Sm.

Synonyms
- Ficus arisanensis Ficus duclouxii Ficus foleolata var. henryi Ficus impressa Ficus lacrymans Ficus luducca Ficus nipponica Ficus thunbergii

= Ficus sarmentosa =

Species of fig tree

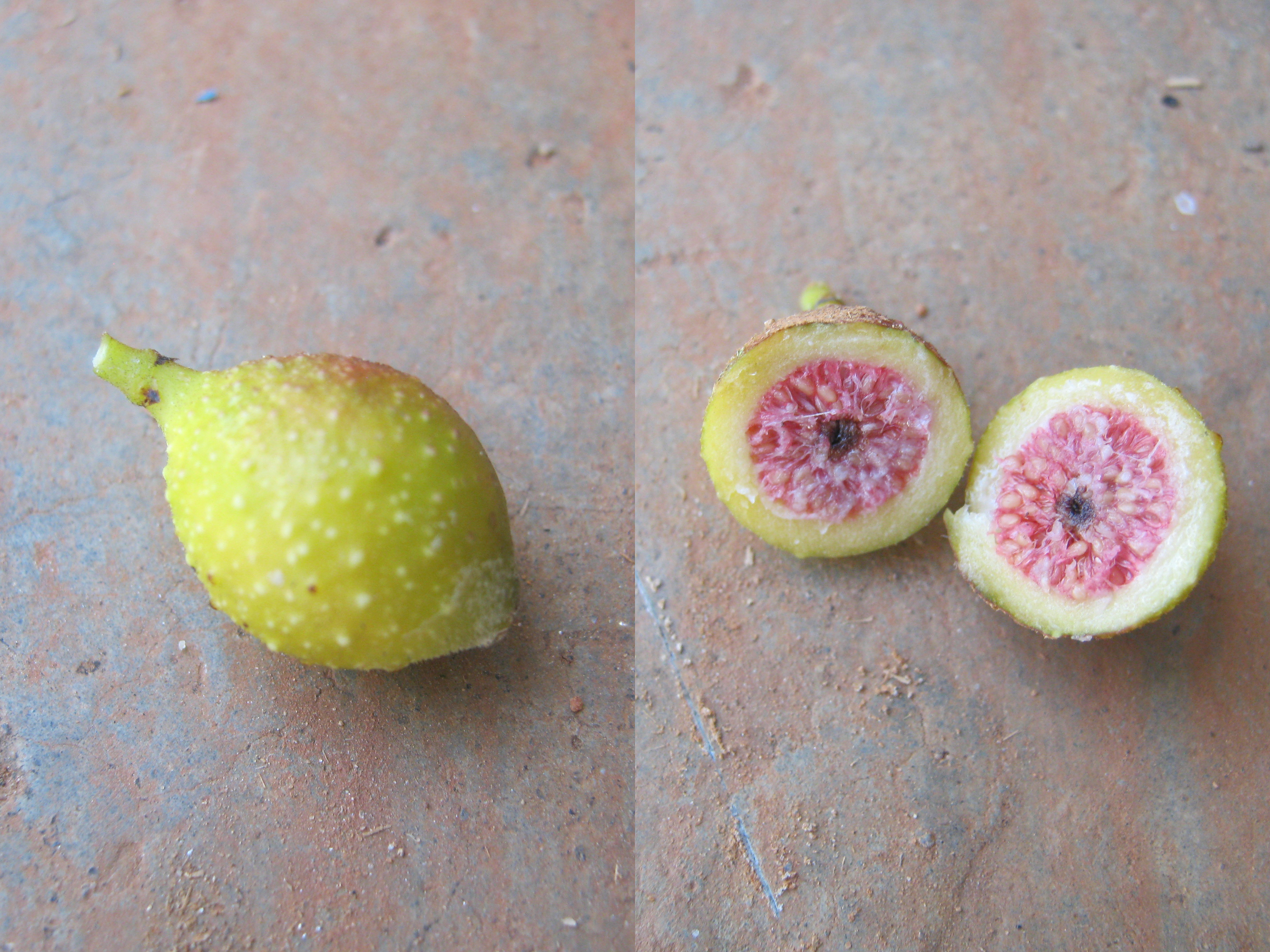
Fruit and cross section of Ficus sarmentosa.

Ficus sarmentosa is a species of fig tree with edible fruit. F. sarmentosa is native to China, Eastern Asia, the Indian subcontinent and the Indo-China region. Its habitats include forests, scrub, and mountains.
