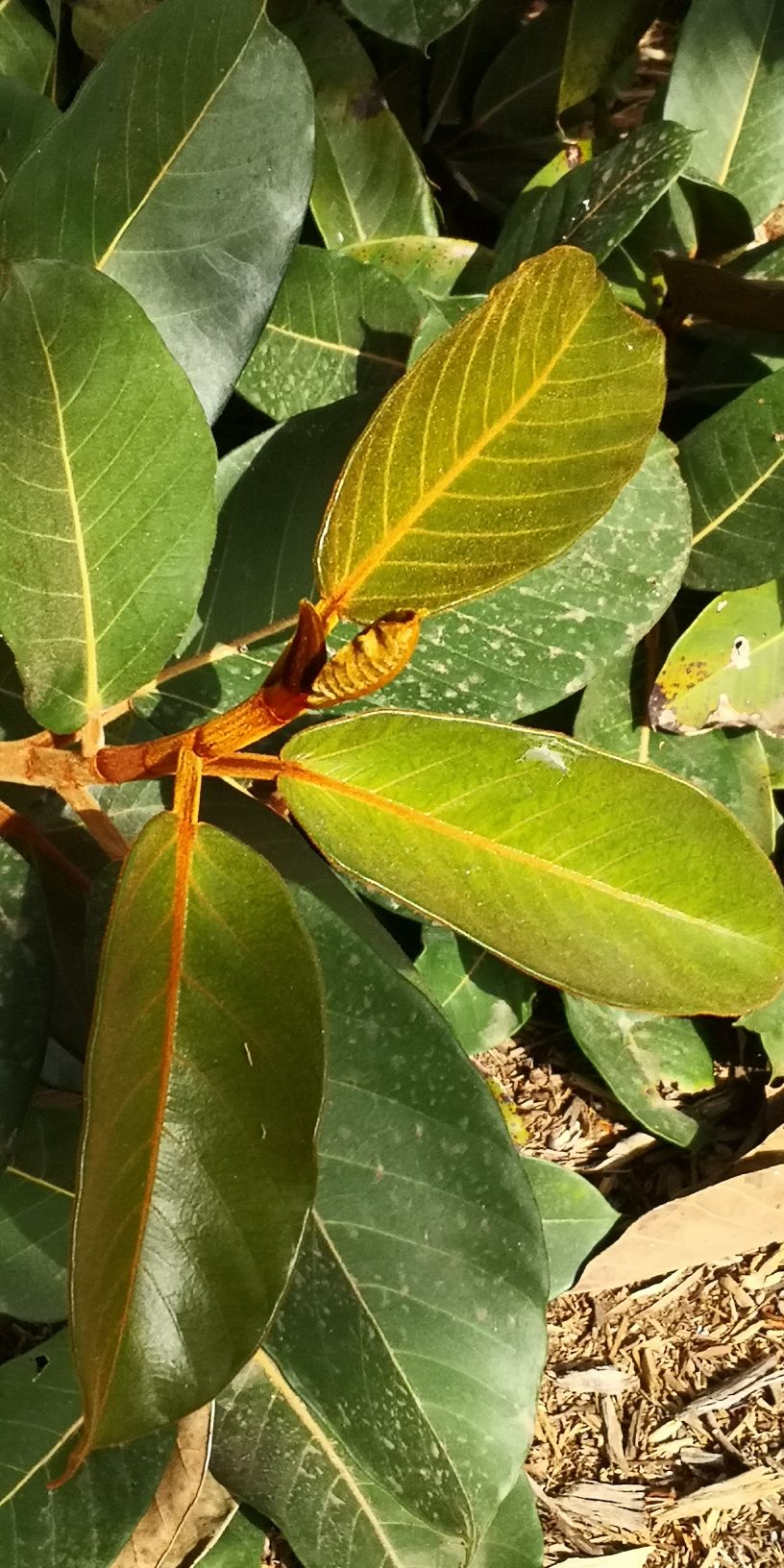
- Santa Cruz de Tenerife, Canary Islands

Conservation status
- Least Concern (IUCN 3.1)

Scientific classification
- Kingdom: Plantae
- Clade: Tracheophytes
- Clade: Angiosperms
- Clade: Eudicots
- Clade: Rosids
- Order: Rosales
- Family: Moraceae
- Genus: Ficus
- Species: F. velutina

Binomial name
- Ficus velutina Humb. & Bonpl. ex Willd.

Synonyms
- Ficus clethrifolia Willd.; Ficus danielis Dugand; Ficus frigida Linden ex Miq.; Ficus glycicarpa (Miq.) Miq.; Ficus microchlamys Standl.; Urostigma glycicarpum Miq.; Urostigma velutinum (Humb. & Bonpl. ex Willd.) Miq.

= Ficus velutina =

Species of flowering plant

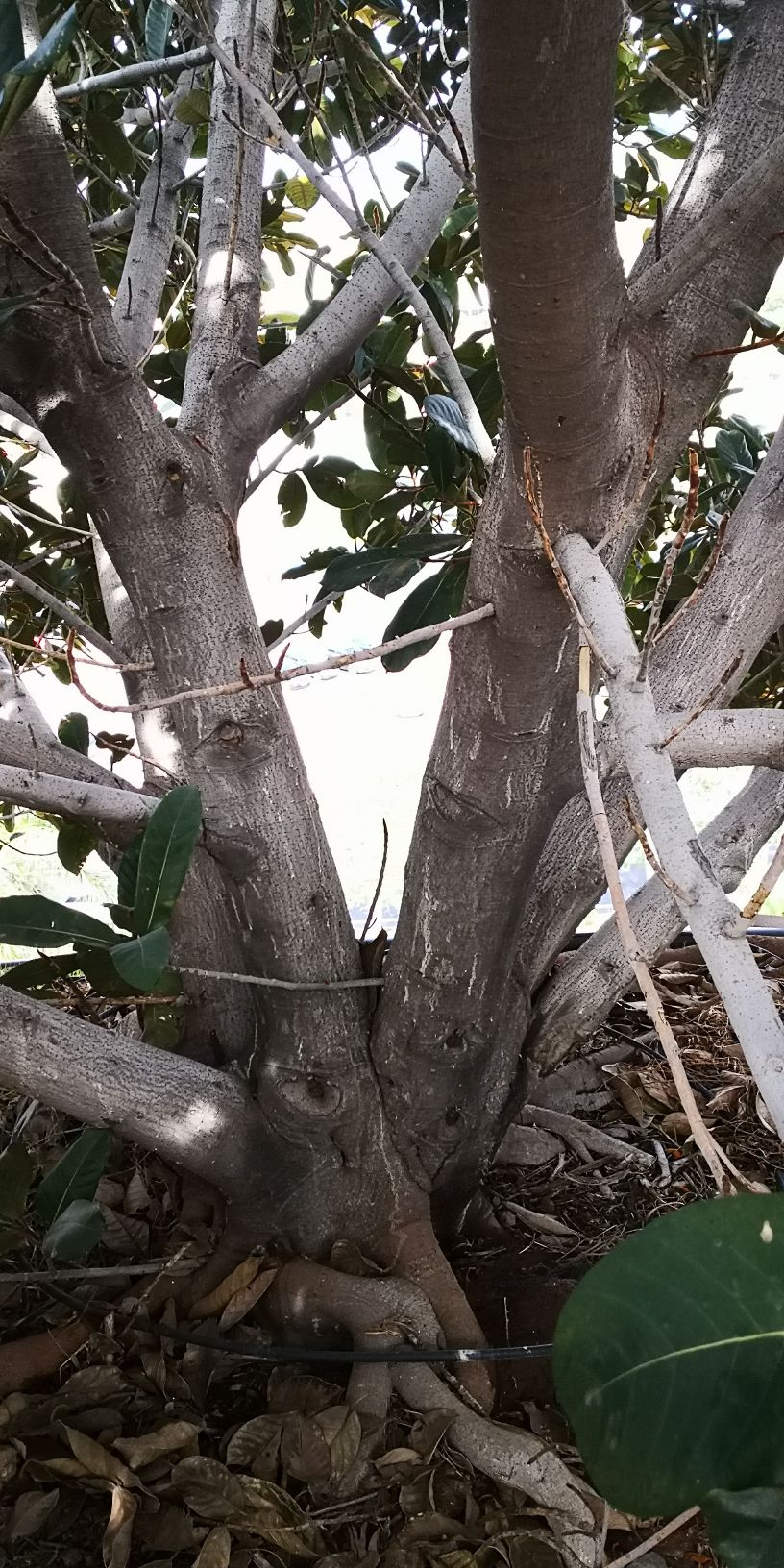
Stem & bark

Ficus velutina is a species of flowering plant in the family Moraceae. It is a tree native to Mexico, Central America, Colombia, Venezuela, Ecuador, and Peru.
