= Ficus catappifolia =

Conservation status
- Least Concern (IUCN 2.3)

Scientific classification
- Kingdom: Plantae
- Clade: Tracheophytes
- Clade: Angiosperms
- Clade: Eudicots
- Clade: Rosids
- Order: Rosales
- Family: Moraceae
- Genus: Ficus
- Subgenus: F. subg. Urostigma
- Species: F. catappifolia

Binomial name
- Ficus catappifolia Kunth & C.D.Bouché

Synonyms
- Urostigma catappifolium (Kunth & C.D.Bouché) Miq.; Ficus schottii Kunth & C.D.Bouché

Species of fig from South America

Ficus catappifolia is a species of flowering plant in the family Moraceae. It is a tree native to northern and eastern Brazil, the Guianas, and Venezuela.
