= Ficus krukovii =

Conservation status
- Least Concern (IUCN 3.1)

Scientific classification
- Kingdom: Plantae
- Clade: Tracheophytes
- Clade: Angiosperms
- Clade: Eudicots
- Clade: Rosids
- Order: Rosales
- Family: Moraceae
- Genus: Ficus
- Species: F. krukovii

Binomial name
- Ficus krukovii Standl.

Species of flowering plant

Ficus krukovii is a species of flowering plant in the family Moraceae. It is a tree native to Bolivia, northern and west-central Brazil, Peru, Ecuador, Colombia, Venezuela, Suriname, and French Guiana, where it grows in lowland tropical rain forest.
