= Ficus hirsuta =

Conservation status
- Least Concern (IUCN 3.1)

Scientific classification
- Kingdom: Plantae
- Clade: Tracheophytes
- Clade: Angiosperms
- Clade: Eudicots
- Clade: Rosids
- Order: Rosales
- Family: Moraceae
- Genus: Ficus
- Subgenus: F. subg. Urostigma
- Species: F. hirsuta

Binomial name
- Ficus hirsuta Schott

Synonyms
- Ficus benjaminea Salzm. ex Miq.; Ficus hirsuta var. fuliginea (Miq.) Miq.; Ficus hirsuta var. gardeniifolia (Miq.) Miq.; Ficus lanuginosa Casar.; Ficus puberula Kunth & C.D.Bouché; Ficus salzmanniana (Miq.) Miq.; Urostigma fuligineum Miq.; Urostigma gardeniifolium Miq.; Urostigma hirsutum (Schott) Miq.; Urostigma hirsutum var. fuligineum Miq.; Urostigma salzmannianum Miq.

Species of flowering plant

Ficus hirsuta is a species of flowering plant in the family Moraceae. It is a tree endemic to eastern and west-central Brazil.

The species was first described by Heinrich Wilhelm Schott in 1827.
