= Ficus mariae =

Scientific classification
- Kingdom: Plantae
- Clade: Tracheophytes
- Clade: Angiosperms
- Clade: Eudicots
- Clade: Rosids
- Order: Rosales
- Family: Moraceae
- Genus: Ficus
- Species: F. mariae

Binomial name
- Ficus mariae C.C.Berg, Emygdio & Carauta

Species of fig

Ficus mariae is a species of tree in the family Moraceae. It is native to South America, specifically eastern Brazil and Bolivia. Ficus mariae is an evergreen tree, it can grow from 6-14 meters tall.
