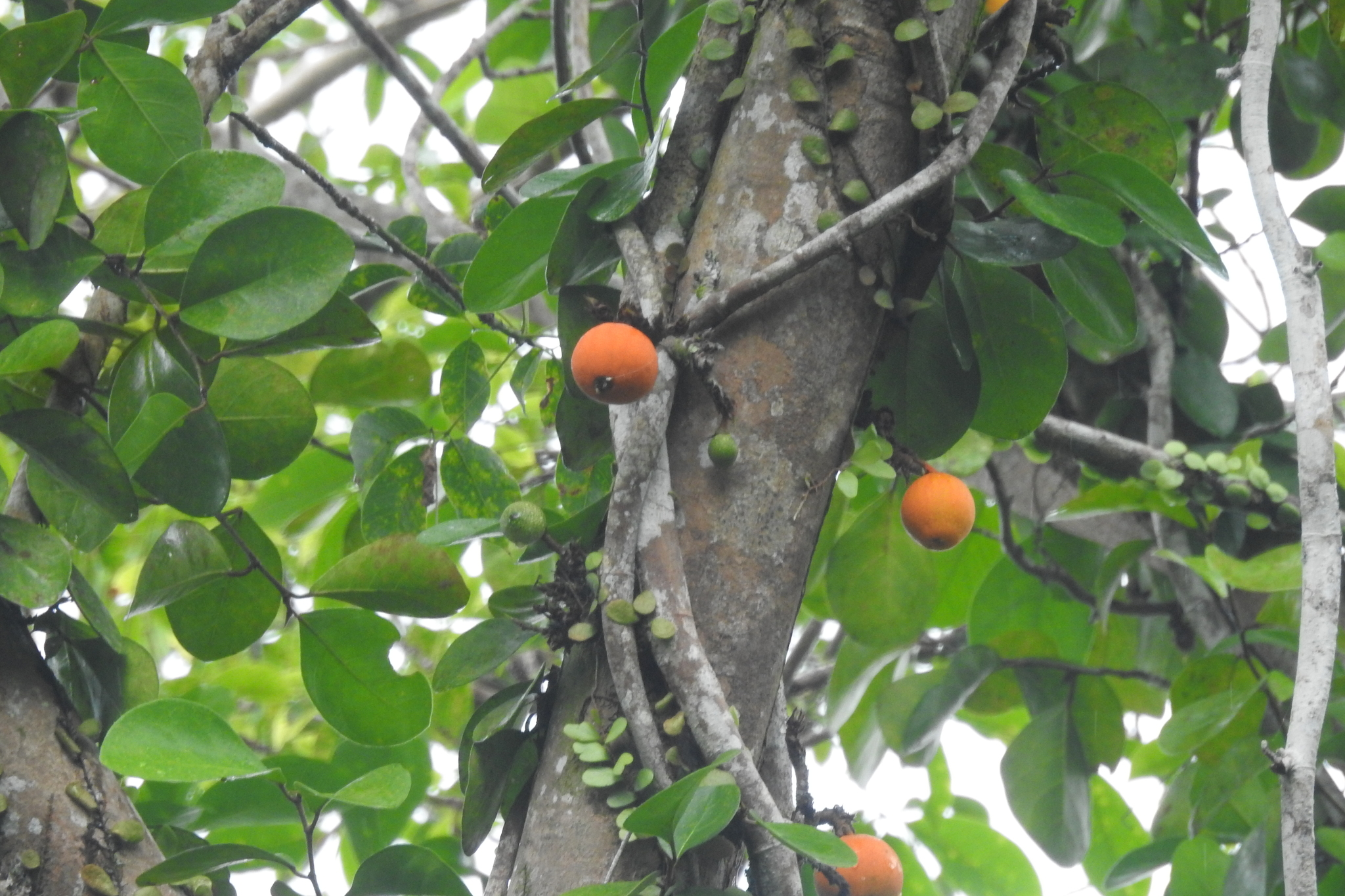

Scientific classification
- Kingdom: Plantae
- Clade: Tracheophytes
- Clade: Angiosperms
- Clade: Eudicots
- Clade: Rosids
- Order: Rosales
- Family: Moraceae
- Genus: Ficus
- Subgenus: F. subg. Synoecia
- Species: F. punctata

Binomial name
- Ficus punctata Thunb.

Synonyms
- Ficus aurantiacea Griff.

= Ficus punctata =

Species of climbing fig

Ficus punctata of the Mulberry Family (Moraceae) is a lesser-known climbing liana or groundcover reported from Myanmar, the Andaman-Nicobar Archipelago, Thailand, Indochina, Malaysia, and Indonesia with remarkable ornamental value. It is a handsome woody liana with spectacular white spotted orange or red fruits. This taxon occurs in disturbed forests and rarely along the edges of the evergreen forests. This species has remarkable ornamental value and can be introduced in gardens. This Ficus can be identified in the field by its climbing habit, presence of milky latex, rhomboidal obovate coriaceous leaves, and beautiful spotted crimson-orange fruits. Its symbiotic partner is the fig wasp Wiebesia contubernalis, which pollinates it.
