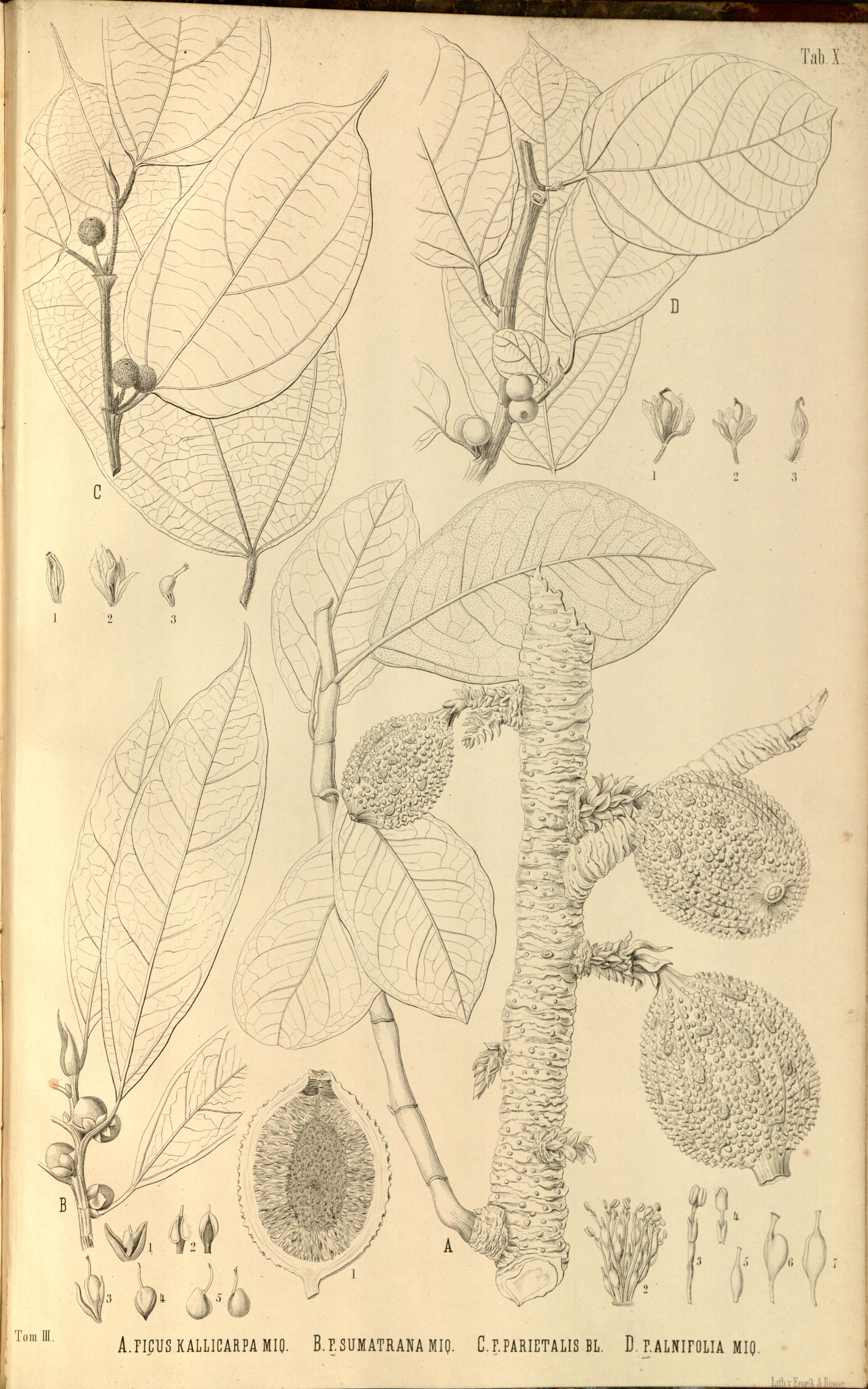

Conservation status
- Least Concern (IUCN 3.1)

Scientific classification
- Kingdom: Plantae
- Clade: Tracheophytes
- Clade: Angiosperms
- Clade: Eudicots
- Clade: Rosids
- Order: Rosales
- Family: Moraceae
- Genus: Ficus
- Species: F. sumatrana

Binomial name
- Ficus sumatrana (Miq.) Miq.

Synonyms
- Ficus dulitensis K.M. Kochummen; Ficus palaquiifolia Corner; Ficus pseudoacamptophylla Valet.; Ficus pseudorubra (Miq.) Miq.; Ficus subsumatrana Gagnep.; Ficus zollingeriana (Miq.) Miq.; Ficus sumatrana var. circumscissa Corner; Ficus sumatrana var. microsyce Corner; Urostigma monadenum Miq.; Urostigma pseudorubrum Miq.; Urostigma sumatranum Miq.; Urostigma zollingerianum Miq.

= Ficus sumatrana =

Species of fig

Ficus sumatrana is an Asian species of fig tree in the family Moraceae. Its native range is Indo-China to western and central Malesia (Peninsular Malaysia, Sumatra, Java, Borneo, and the Philippines).

The species was first described as Urostigma sumatranum by Friedrich Anton Wilhelm Miquel in 1851. In 1867 Miquel placed the species in genus Ficus as f. sumatrana. No subspecies are listed in the Catalogue of Life;

== Description ==
The species can be found in Vietnam: where it may be called đa trai nhỏ or đa quả nhỏ ("small-fruited banyan"). This refers to the many small fruit (syconia) which are only 4 mm in diameter. Trees grow to approximately 20 m (66 ft) and the leaves have a small drip point at their apex.
