= Ficus ursina =

Conservation status
- Endangered (IUCN 2.3)

Scientific classification
- Kingdom: Plantae
- Clade: Tracheophytes
- Clade: Angiosperms
- Clade: Eudicots
- Clade: Rosids
- Order: Rosales
- Family: Moraceae
- Genus: Ficus
- Species: F. ursina

Binomial name
- Ficus ursina Standl.

Species of fig

Ficus ursina is a species of fig tree in the family Moraceae.

It is endemic to Acre state in western Brazil.
