= Ficus aripuanensis =

Conservation status
- Endangered (IUCN 2.3)

Scientific classification
- Kingdom: Plantae
- Clade: Tracheophytes
- Clade: Angiosperms
- Clade: Eudicots
- Clade: Rosids
- Order: Rosales
- Family: Moraceae
- Genus: Ficus
- Subgenus: F. subg. Urostigma
- Species: F. aripuanensis

Binomial name
- Ficus aripuanensis C.C.Berg & Kooy

Species of fig from Brazil

Ficus aripuanensis is a species of plant in the family Moraceae.

It is endemic to Mato Grosso and Pará states in Brazil.
