= Ficus pallida =

Conservation status
- Least Concern (IUCN 2.3)

Scientific classification
- Kingdom: Plantae
- Clade: Tracheophytes
- Clade: Angiosperms
- Clade: Eudicots
- Clade: Rosids
- Order: Rosales
- Family: Moraceae
- Genus: Ficus
- Species: F. pallida

Binomial name
- Ficus pallida Vahl

Synonyms
- Ficus ligustrina Kunth & C.D.Bouché; Ficus moritziana Kunth; Ficus prinoides Humb. & Bonpl. ex Willd.; Ficus prinoides var. genuina Kuntze; Urostigma pallidum (Vahl) Miq.; Urostigma prinoides (Humb. & Bonpl. ex Willd.) Miq.

Species of fig

Ficus pallida is a species of plant in the family Moraceae. It is native to eastern Bolivia, northern and west-central Brazil, Colombia, Peru, Venezuela, Trinidad and Tobago, the Netherlands Antilles, and the Venezuelan Antilles. In Bolivia, it is one of a few closely related trees in the genus Ficus popularly known as bibosi.

The species was first described by Martin Vahl in 1805.
