= Ficus sphenophylla =

Conservation status
- Least Concern (IUCN 3.1)

Scientific classification
- Kingdom: Plantae
- Clade: Tracheophytes
- Clade: Angiosperms
- Clade: Eudicots
- Clade: Rosids
- Order: Rosales
- Family: Moraceae
- Genus: Ficus
- Species: F. sphenophylla

Binomial name
- Ficus sphenophylla Standl.

Species of flowering plant

Ficus sphenophylla is a species of fig tree in the family Moraceae. It is native to Bolivia, northern Brazil, Colombia, Ecuador, Guyana, Peru, and Venezuela.

The species was first described by Paul Carpenter Standley in 1937.
