= Ficus lateriflora =

Conservation status
- Critically Endangered (IUCN 2.3)

Scientific classification
- Kingdom: Plantae
- Clade: Tracheophytes
- Clade: Angiosperms
- Clade: Eudicots
- Clade: Rosids
- Order: Rosales
- Family: Moraceae
- Genus: Ficus
- Subgenus: F. subg. Sycidium
- Species: F. lateriflora

Binomial name
- Ficus lateriflora Vahl

Synonyms
- Morus laciniata Poir.; Ficus morifolia Lam.

Species of fig from Mauritius and Réunion

Ficus lateriflora is a species of fig tree in the family Moraceae.

It is endemic to Mauritius and Réunion, islands off the coast of East Africa in the Indian Ocean .

It reaches a height of up to 12 metres (39 ft), and is found in altitudes up to 1,400 metres (4,600 ft).
