= Ficus daimingshanensis =

Scientific classification
- Kingdom: Plantae
- Clade: Tracheophytes
- Clade: Angiosperms
- Clade: Eudicots
- Clade: Rosids
- Order: Rosales
- Family: Moraceae
- Genus: Ficus
- Subgenus: F. subg. Ficus
- Species: F. daimingshanensis

Binomial name
- Ficus daimingshanensis S.S. Chang

Species of fig from China

Ficus daimingshanensis is a plant species native to the Chinese provinces of Guangxi and Hunan. It grows on limestone soils at elevations of approximately 2,200 m (7,200 ft). Type locality is Daming Shan, a mountain in Guangxi Province near Dafeng.

Ficus daimingshanensis is a shrub up to 2 m (6.6 ft) tall. Stipules are red, usually about 1 cm (0.5 in) long. Leaf blades are ovate to elliptic, up to 22 cm (8.5 in) long. Figs are red, 1.0–1.5 cm (0.39–0.59 in) in diameter, borne in the axils of the leaves.
