= Ficus andamanica =

Conservation status
- Endangered (IUCN 2.3)

Scientific classification
- Kingdom: Plantae
- Clade: Tracheophytes
- Clade: Angiosperms
- Clade: Eudicots
- Clade: Rosids
- Order: Rosales
- Family: Moraceae
- Genus: Ficus
- Subgenus: F. subg. Sycidium
- Species: F. andamanica

Binomial name
- Ficus andamanica Corner

Species of fig from the Andaman Islands

Ficus andamanica is a species of fig tree in the family Moraceae.

The tree is endemic to the Andaman Islands, a territorial part of India located off the Burmese coast.

It is threatened by habitat loss.
