= Ficus muelleriana =

Conservation status
- Endangered (IUCN 3.1)

Scientific classification
- Kingdom: Plantae
- Clade: Tracheophytes
- Clade: Angiosperms
- Clade: Eudicots
- Clade: Rosids
- Order: Rosales
- Family: Moraceae
- Genus: Ficus
- Species: F. muelleriana

Binomial name
- Ficus muelleriana C.C.Berg

Species of flowering plant

Ficus muelleriana is a species of plant in the family Moraceae. It is endemic to Mozambique. It is threatened by habitat loss.
