= Ficus broadwayi =

Conservation status
- Least Concern (IUCN 3.1)

Scientific classification
- Kingdom: Plantae
- Clade: Tracheophytes
- Clade: Angiosperms
- Clade: Eudicots
- Clade: Rosids
- Order: Rosales
- Family: Moraceae
- Genus: Ficus
- Subgenus: F. subg. Urostigma
- Species: F. broadwayi

Binomial name
- Ficus broadwayi Urb.

Synonyms
- Ficus mendelsonii Britton; Ficus savannarum Standl.

Species of fig from South America

Ficus broadwayi is a species of plant in the family Moraceae. It is a tree native to northern and eastern Brazil, Colombia, the Guianas, and Venezuela.
