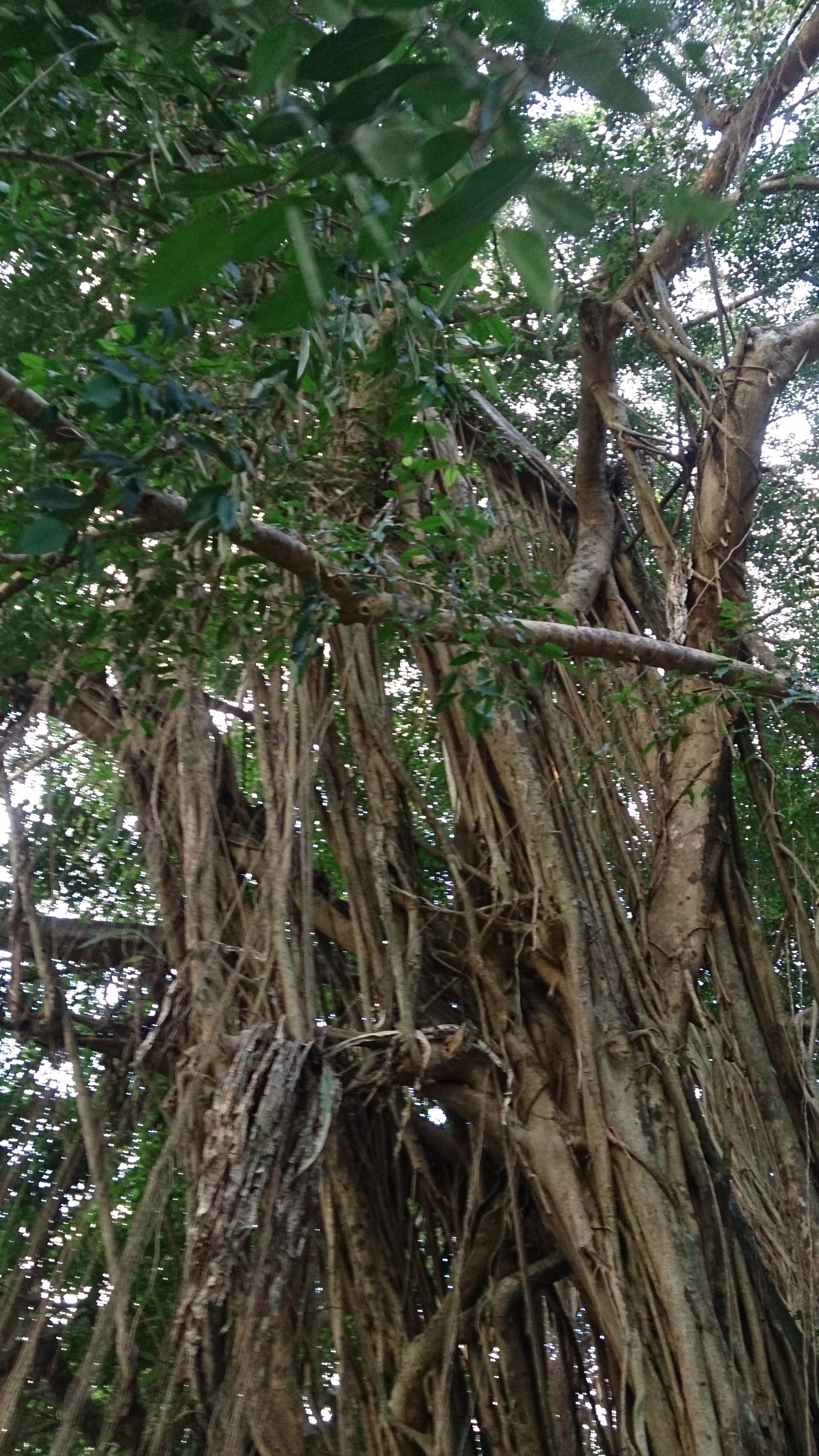

Conservation status
- Least Concern (IUCN 3.1)

Scientific classification
- Kingdom: Plantae
- Clade: Tracheophytes
- Clade: Angiosperms
- Clade: Eudicots
- Clade: Rosids
- Order: Rosales
- Family: Moraceae
- Genus: Ficus
- Species: F. kurzii

Binomial name
- Ficus kurzii King

Synonyms
- Ficus euphylla Kurz; Ficus nuda var. macrocarpa Kurz

= Ficus kurzii =

Species of fig

Ficus kurzii is a species of fig tree in the family Moraceae. It may be called by the common name Burmese banyan. No subspecies are listed in the Catalogue of Life. Its native range is China (Yunnan) Indo-China and Malesia; the species can be found in Vietnam where it may be called Ða Kurz.

== Gallery ==
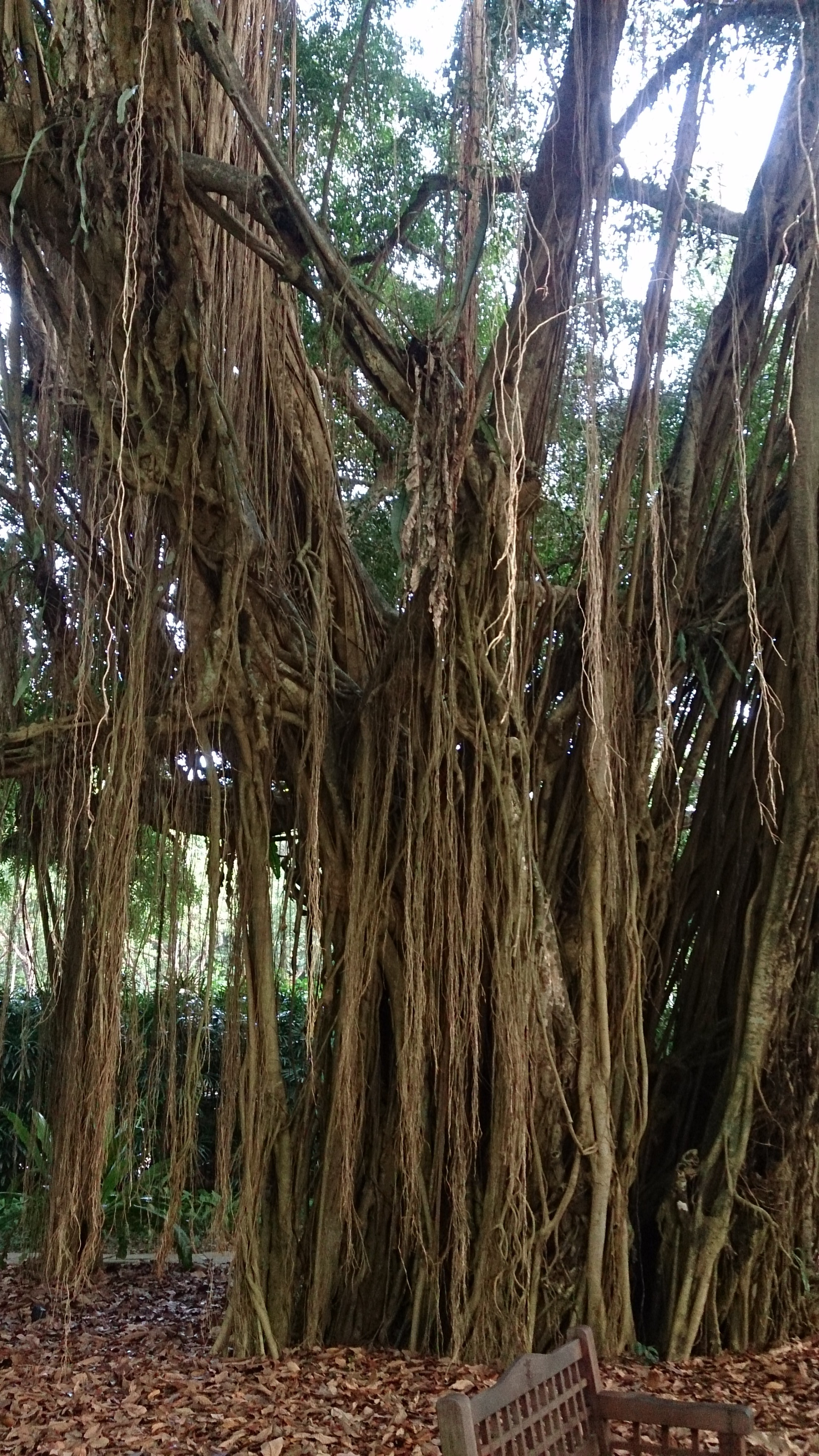

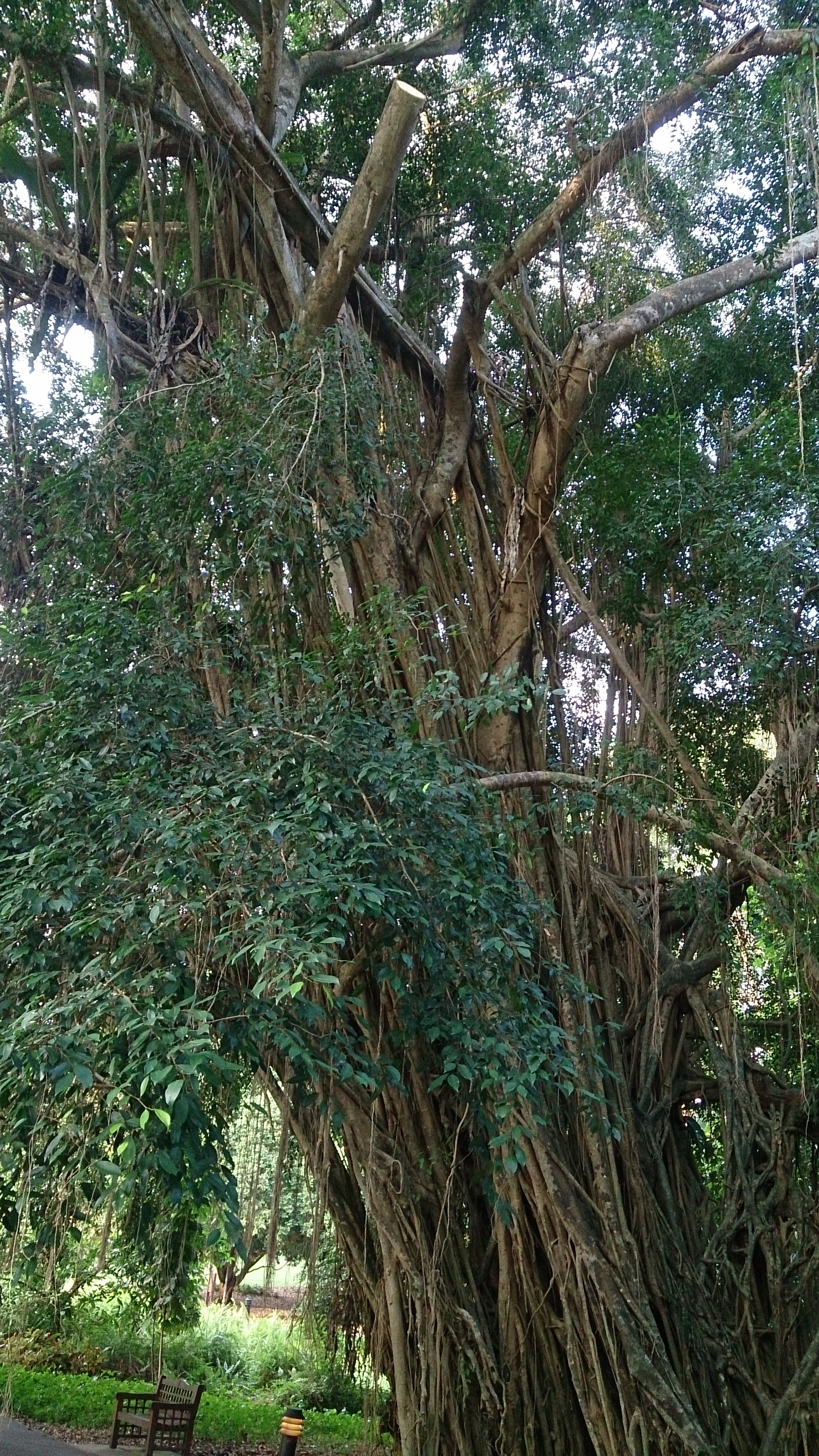

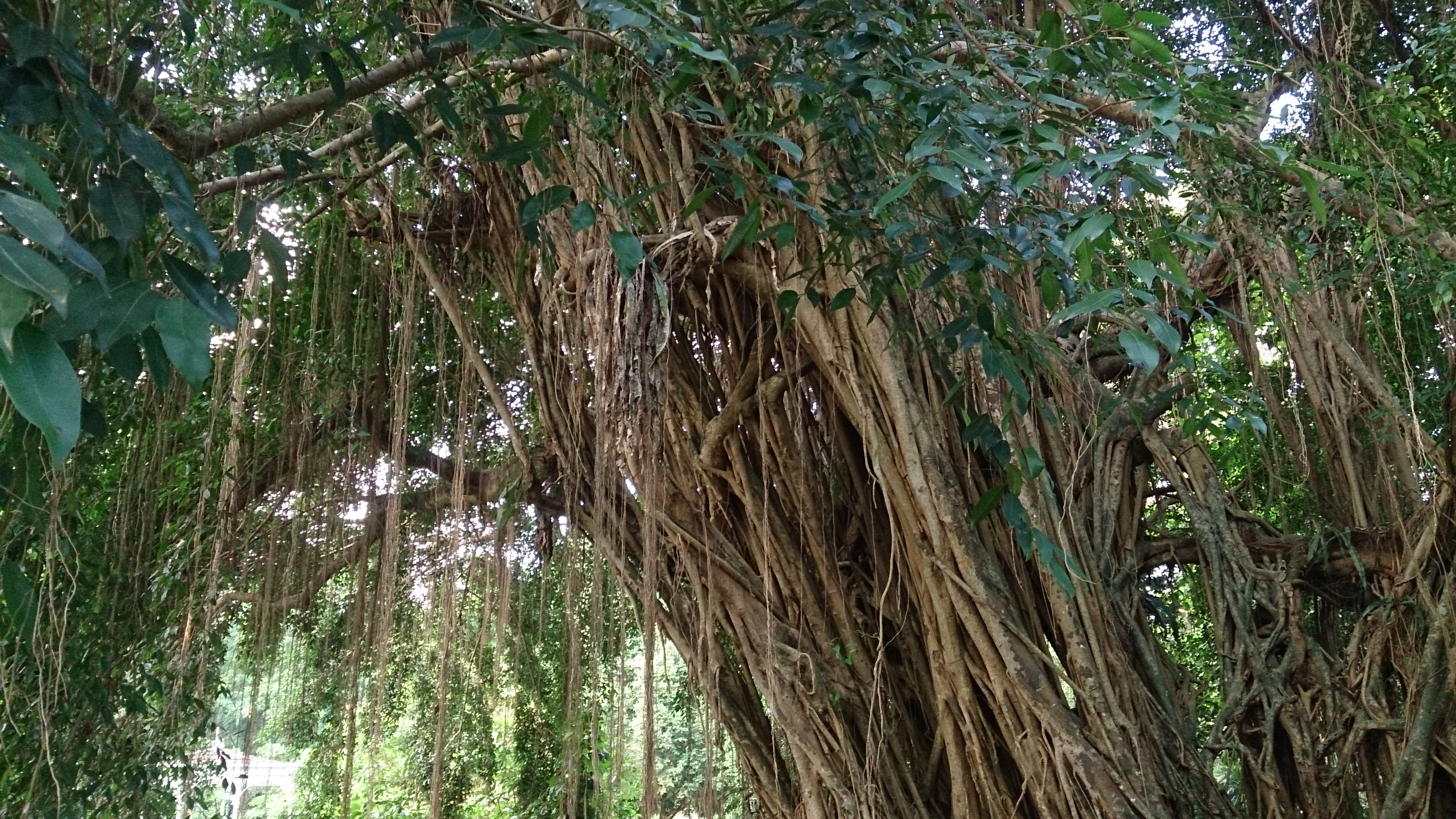

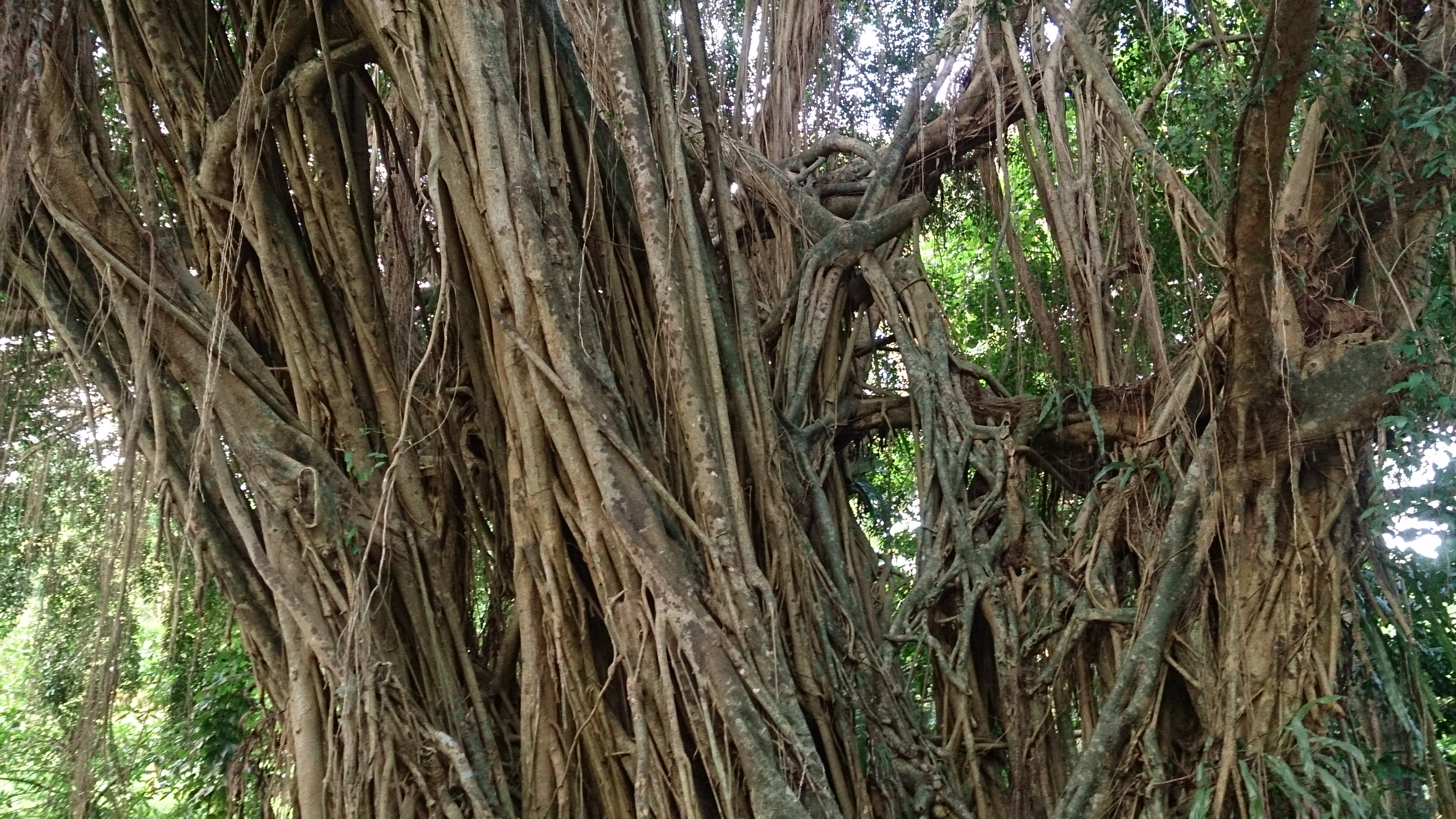

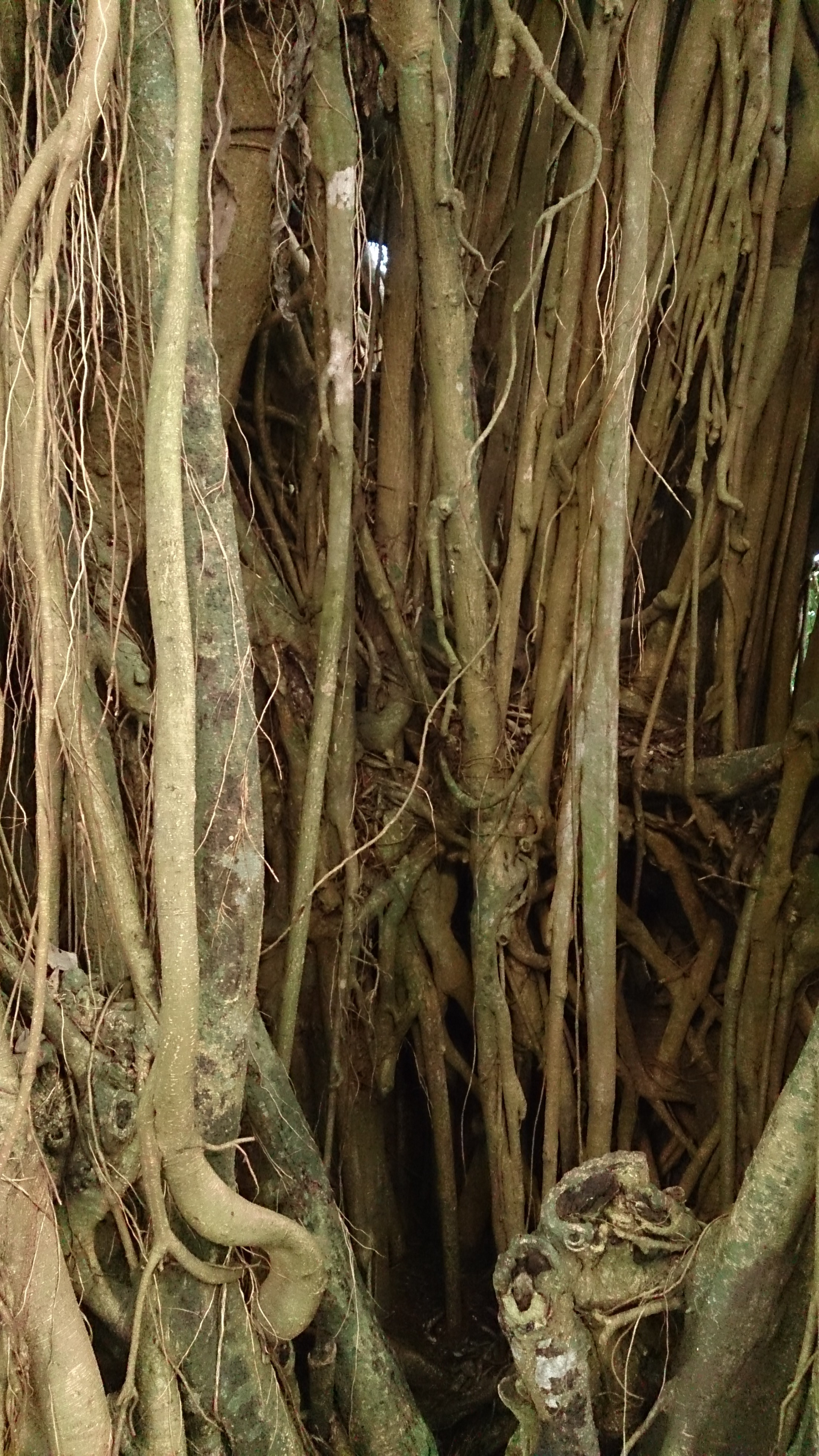
