= Ficus bojeri =

Conservation status
- Vulnerable (IUCN 2.3)

Scientific classification
- Kingdom: Plantae
- Clade: Tracheophytes
- Clade: Angiosperms
- Clade: Eudicots
- Clade: Rosids
- Order: Rosales
- Family: Moraceae
- Genus: Ficus
- Subgenus: F. subg. Sycidium
- Species: F. bojeri

Binomial name
- Ficus bojeri Baker

Species of fig from the Seychelles

Ficus bojeri is a species of plant in the family Moraceae. It is endemic to Seychelles. It is a fairly small ficus, or fig, tree with small branches and oval-shaped leaves. It is greyish-brown in color. The fruit hangs from the trunk of the tree on centimeter long twigs.
