= Ficus costata =

Conservation status
- Vulnerable (IUCN 3.1)

Scientific classification
- Kingdom: Plantae
- Clade: Tracheophytes
- Clade: Angiosperms
- Clade: Eudicots
- Clade: Rosids
- Order: Rosales
- Family: Moraceae
- Tribe: Ficeae
- Genus: Ficus
- Subgenus: F. subg. Urostigma
- Species: F. costata

Binomial name
- Ficus costata Aiton

Synonyms
- Ficus caudiculata Trimen; Ficus mooniana King; Urostigma wightianum var. majus Thwaites

Species of Asian fig tree

Ficus costata is an Asian species of fig tree in the family Moraceae. It is native to southwestern India, Sri Lanka, the Nicobar Islands, and Vietnam. In Vietnam it may be called sung sóng.

The species was described by William Aiton in 1789. No subspecies are listed in the Catalogue of Life
