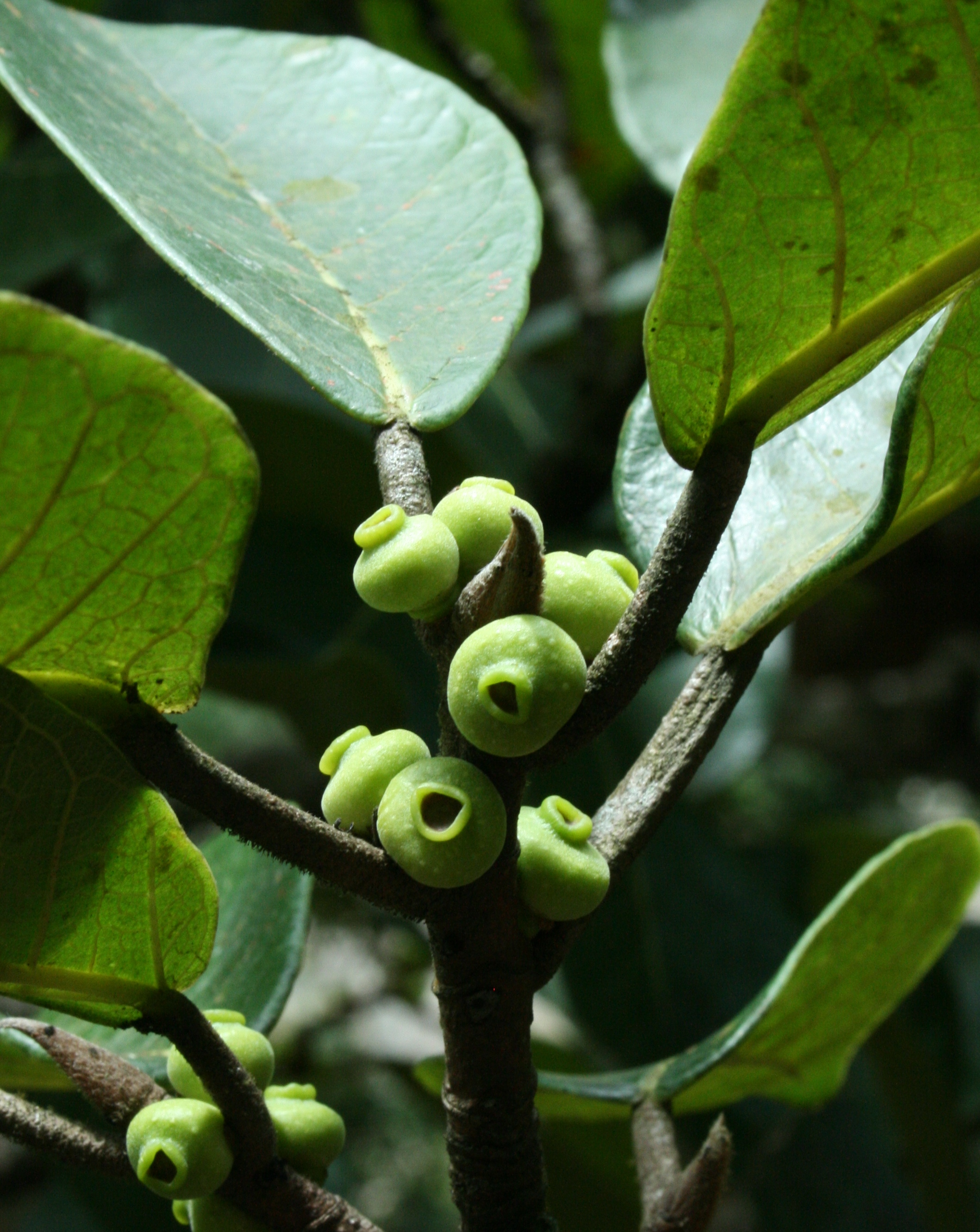
- The fruit of Ficus popenoei subsp. malacocarpa

Conservation status
- Least Concern (IUCN 3.1)

Scientific classification
- Kingdom: Plantae
- Clade: Tracheophytes
- Clade: Angiosperms
- Clade: Eudicots
- Clade: Rosids
- Order: Rosales
- Family: Moraceae
- Genus: Ficus
- Species: F. popenoei

Binomial name
- Ficus popenoei Standl.

Subspecies
- Ficus popenoei subsp. malacocarpa (Standl.) C.C.Berg; Ficus popenoei subsp. popenoei

Synonyms
- synonyms of subsp. malacocarpa: Ficus malacocarpa Standl.; Ficus scabrida Pittier; synonyms of subsp. popenoei: Ficus tolimensis Standl.

= Ficus popenoei =

Species of fig

Ficus popenoei is a species of fig found in the tropical Americas, from Brazil and Bolivia up to Guatemala and Belize.

== Subspecies ==
There are two subspecies:

- Ficus popenoei subsp. malacocarpa (Standl.) C.C.Berg – sometimes considered a separate species, Ficus malacocarpa, which is considered a species of least concern
- Ficus popenoei subsp. popenoei
