= Ficus schumacheri =

Conservation status
- Least Concern (IUCN 3.1)

Scientific classification
- Kingdom: Plantae
- Clade: Tracheophytes
- Clade: Angiosperms
- Clade: Eudicots
- Clade: Rosids
- Order: Rosales
- Family: Moraceae
- Genus: Ficus
- Species: F. schumacheri

Binomial name
- Ficus schumacheri (Liebm.) Griseb.

Synonyms
- Urostigma schumacheri Liebm.

Species of flowering plant

Ficus schumacheri is a species of flowering plant in the family Moraceae. It is a hemiepiphytic shrub or small tree which grows up to 8 meters tall, which is native to northern and west-central Brazil, the Guianas, Peru, Trinidad and Tobago, and Venezuela. It grows in lowland swamp forests, and rarely in terra firme rain forests. The species is monoecious.

The species was first described as Urostigma schumacheri by Frederik Liebmann in 1851. In 1859 August Grisebach placed the species in genus Ficus as F. schumacheri.
