= Ficus blepharophylla =

Conservation status
- Endangered (IUCN 2.3)

Scientific classification
- Kingdom: Plantae
- Clade: Tracheophytes
- Clade: Angiosperms
- Clade: Eudicots
- Clade: Rosids
- Order: Rosales
- Family: Moraceae
- Genus: Ficus
- Subgenus: F. subg. Urostigma
- Species: F. blepharophylla

Binomial name
- Ficus blepharophylla Vázq.Avila

Endangered species of fig tree from Brazil

Ficus blepharophylla is a species of fig tree in the family Moraceae.

The tree is endemic to Roraima state in northern Brazil.

It is an IUCN Red List Endangered species.
