= Ficus roraimensis =

Conservation status
- Endangered (IUCN 2.3)

Scientific classification
- Kingdom: Plantae
- Clade: Tracheophytes
- Clade: Angiosperms
- Clade: Eudicots
- Clade: Rosids
- Order: Rosales
- Family: Moraceae
- Genus: Ficus
- Species: F. roraimensis

Binomial name
- Ficus roraimensis C.C.Berg

Species of fig

Ficus roraimensis is a species of fig tree in the family Moraceae.

The tree is endemic to Roraima state in western Brazil.

It is an IUCN Red List Endangered species.
