= Ficus albert-smithii =

Conservation status
- Least Concern (IUCN 3.1)

Scientific classification
- Kingdom: Plantae
- Clade: Tracheophytes
- Clade: Angiosperms
- Clade: Eudicots
- Clade: Rosids
- Order: Rosales
- Family: Moraceae
- Genus: Ficus
- Subgenus: F. subg. Urostigma
- Species: F. albert-smithii

Binomial name
- Ficus albert-smithii Standl.

Synonyms
- Ficus frondosa Standl., nom. illeg. homonym. post.; Ficus hypochrysea Dugand

Species of fig from South America

Ficus albert-smithii is a species of flowering plant in the family Moraceae. It is a tree native to Bolivia, northern and west-central Brazil, Colombia, Ecuador, the Guianas, Peru, and Venezuela, where it grows in lowland tropical rain forest.
