= Ficus amazonica =

Conservation status
- Least Concern (IUCN 3.1)

Scientific classification
- Kingdom: Plantae
- Clade: Tracheophytes
- Clade: Angiosperms
- Clade: Eudicots
- Clade: Rosids
- Order: Rosales
- Family: Moraceae
- Genus: Ficus
- Subgenus: F. subg. Urostigma
- Species: F. amazonica

Binomial name
- Ficus amazonica (Miq.) André

Synonyms
- Ficus angustifolia (Miq.) Miq.; Ficus surinamensis Miq.; Urostigma amazonicum Miq.; Urostigma angustifolium Miq.

Species of fig from the Neotropics

Ficus amazonica is a species of flowering plant in the family Moraceae. It is a tree native to northern and west-central Brazil, Colombia, Ecuador, the Guianas, Peru, Trinidad and Tobago, and Venezuela. It is a tree which grows up to 18 meters tall which can behave like a strangler fig. It is native to the lowland tropical rain forests of the Amazon biome and Trinidad and Tobago, where it grows in riverine forests and terra firma forests on rocky outcrops up to 700 meters elevation.

The species was first described as Urostigma amazonicum by Friedrich Anton Wilhelm Miquel in 1847. In 1866 Édouard André placed it in genus Ficus as F. amazonica.
