= Ficus pisocarpa =

Conservation status
- Least Concern (IUCN 3.1)

Scientific classification
- Kingdom: Plantae
- Clade: Tracheophytes
- Clade: Angiosperms
- Clade: Eudicots
- Clade: Rosids
- Order: Rosales
- Family: Moraceae
- Genus: Ficus
- Subgenus: F. subg. Urostigma
- Species: F. pisocarpa

Binomial name
- Ficus pisocarpa Blume

Synonyms
- Ficus cycloneura (Miq.) King; Ficus episima Corner; Ficus microstoma Wall. ex King; Urostigma cycloneuron Miq.; Urostigma pisocarpum (Bl.) Miq.; Urostigma tjiela Miq.

Species of fig

Ficus pisocarpa is a banyan fig species in the family Moraceae. The species can be found in southern China, Indo-China, and western Malesia (Borneo, Java, Peninsular Malaysia, the Philippines, and Sumatra). In Vietnam, it may be called đa đậu.

The species was described by Carl Ludwig Blume in 1825. No subspecies are listed in the Catalogue of Life.
