= Ficus pakkensis =

Conservation status
- Vulnerable (IUCN 2.3)

Scientific classification
- Kingdom: Plantae
- Clade: Tracheophytes
- Clade: Angiosperms
- Clade: Eudicots
- Clade: Rosids
- Order: Rosales
- Family: Moraceae
- Genus: Ficus
- Species: F. pakkensis

Binomial name
- Ficus pakkensis Standl.

Species of fig

Ficus pakkensis is a species of flowering plant in the family Moraceae. It is a tree native to the Guianas, Venezuela, and the northern Brazilian states of Pará and Maranhão in tropical northern South America.

It is an IUCN Red List Vulnerable species. The Brazilian subpopulation is confined and declining.
