= Ficus ulmifolia =

Conservation status
- Least Concern (IUCN 3.1)

Scientific classification
- Kingdom: Plantae
- Clade: Tracheophytes
- Clade: Angiosperms
- Clade: Eudicots
- Clade: Rosids
- Order: Rosales
- Family: Moraceae
- Genus: Ficus
- Subgenus: F. subg. Sycidium
- Species: F. ulmifolia

Binomial name
- Ficus ulmifolia Lam.

Synonyms
- Covellia ulmifolia (Lam.) Gasp.; Ficus blepharostoma Warb.; Ficus difformis Lam.; Ficus heterophylla Blanco; Ficus hispida Blanco; Ficus hispida var. hastata Blanco; Ficus hispida var. linearis Blanco; Ficus sinuosa Miq.; Ficus sinuosa var. integrifolia Miq.; Ficus sparsifolia Merr.; Ficus ulmifolia f. integra Sata; Ficus ulmifolia f. sinuosa (Miq.) Sata; Ficus velascoi Merr. ex Sata

Species of fig from the Philippines

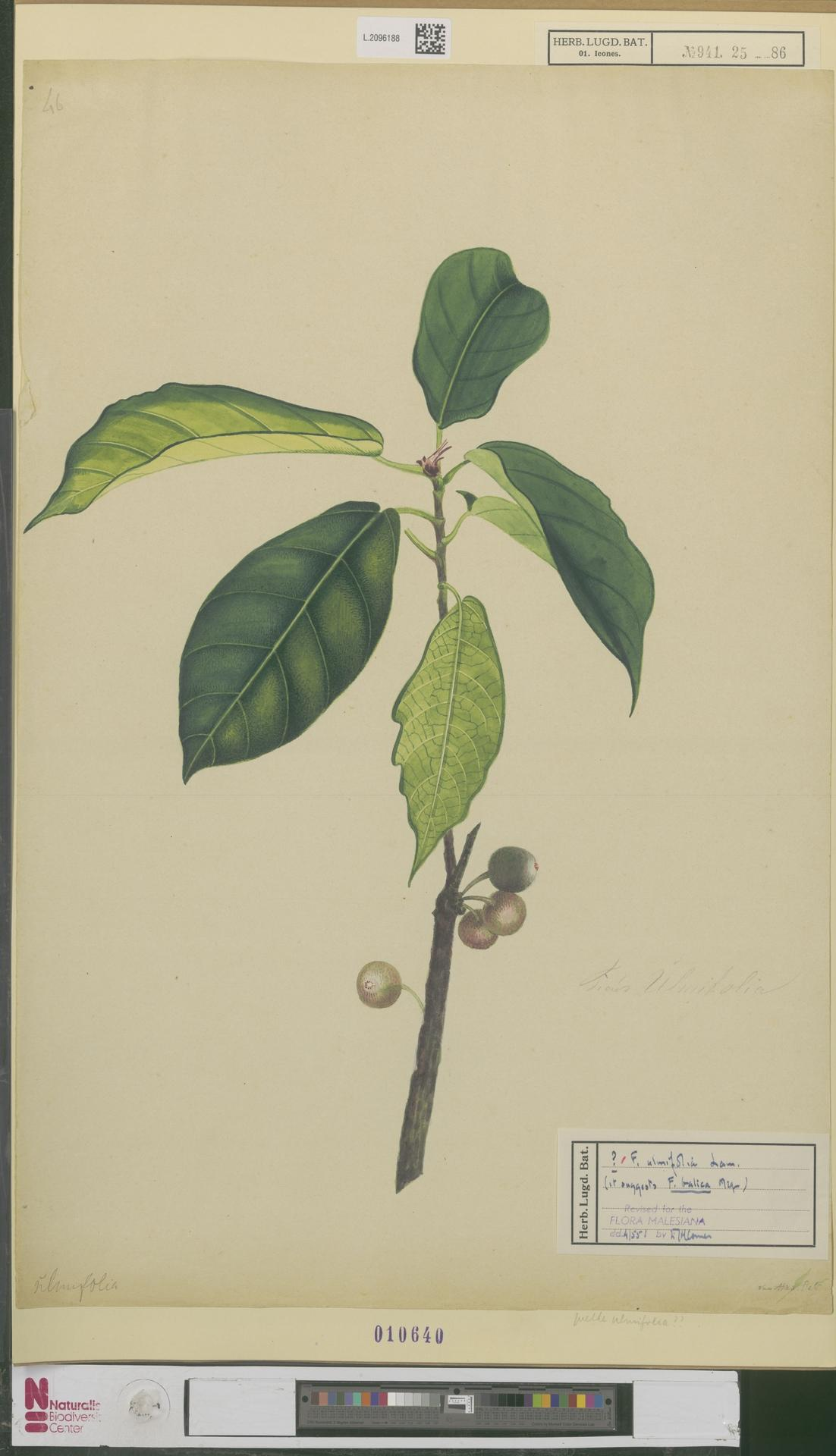
Naturalis Biodiversity Center - Aken, J. van - Ficus ulmifolia Lamarck

Ficus ulmifolia is a species of flowering plant in the family Moraceae. It is a tree endemic to the Philippines. it is a small tree, ranging from three to 12 metres tall. It is native to lowland and montane rain forests, where it grows in thickets from 107 to 1,500 meters elevation. It is threatened by habitat loss.
