= Ficus dendrocida =

Conservation status
- Least Concern (IUCN 3.1)

Scientific classification
- Kingdom: Plantae
- Clade: Tracheophytes
- Clade: Angiosperms
- Clade: Eudicots
- Clade: Rosids
- Order: Rosales
- Family: Moraceae
- Genus: Ficus
- Subgenus: F. subg. Urostigma
- Species: F. dendrocida

Binomial name
- Ficus dendrocida Kunth in Humboldt, Bonpland & Kunth (1817)

Synonyms
- Ficus arboricida Schult.; Ficus dendroctona Spreng., orth. var.; Ficus elliptica Kunth; Pharmacosycea dendroctona Miq.; Urostigma ellipticum (Kunth) Miq.

Species of Neotropical fig

Ficus dendrocida is a species of plants in the family Moraceae. It is a tree native to northern Brazil (Pará), Colombia, Panama, and Venezuela. It grows in tropical lowland rain forest up to 454 meters elevation.
