= Ficus calyptroceras =

Conservation status
- Vulnerable (IUCN 2.3)

Scientific classification
- Kingdom: Plantae
- Clade: Tracheophytes
- Clade: Angiosperms
- Clade: Eudicots
- Clade: Rosids
- Order: Rosales
- Family: Moraceae
- Genus: Ficus
- Subgenus: F. subg. Urostigma
- Species: F. calyptroceras

Binomial name
- Ficus calyptroceras (Miq.) Miq.

Synonyms
- Ficus calyptroceras var. elliotiana (S.Moore) Chodat; Ficus elliotiana S.Moore; Ficus rojasii Hassl., nom. illeg. homonym. post.; Urostigma calyptroceras Miq.

Species of fig

Ficus calyptroceras is a species of fig in the family Moraceae. It is a tree native to Brazil, Bolivia, Paraguay, and northeastern Argentina.

It is an IUCN Red List Vulnerable species, threatened by habitat loss.
