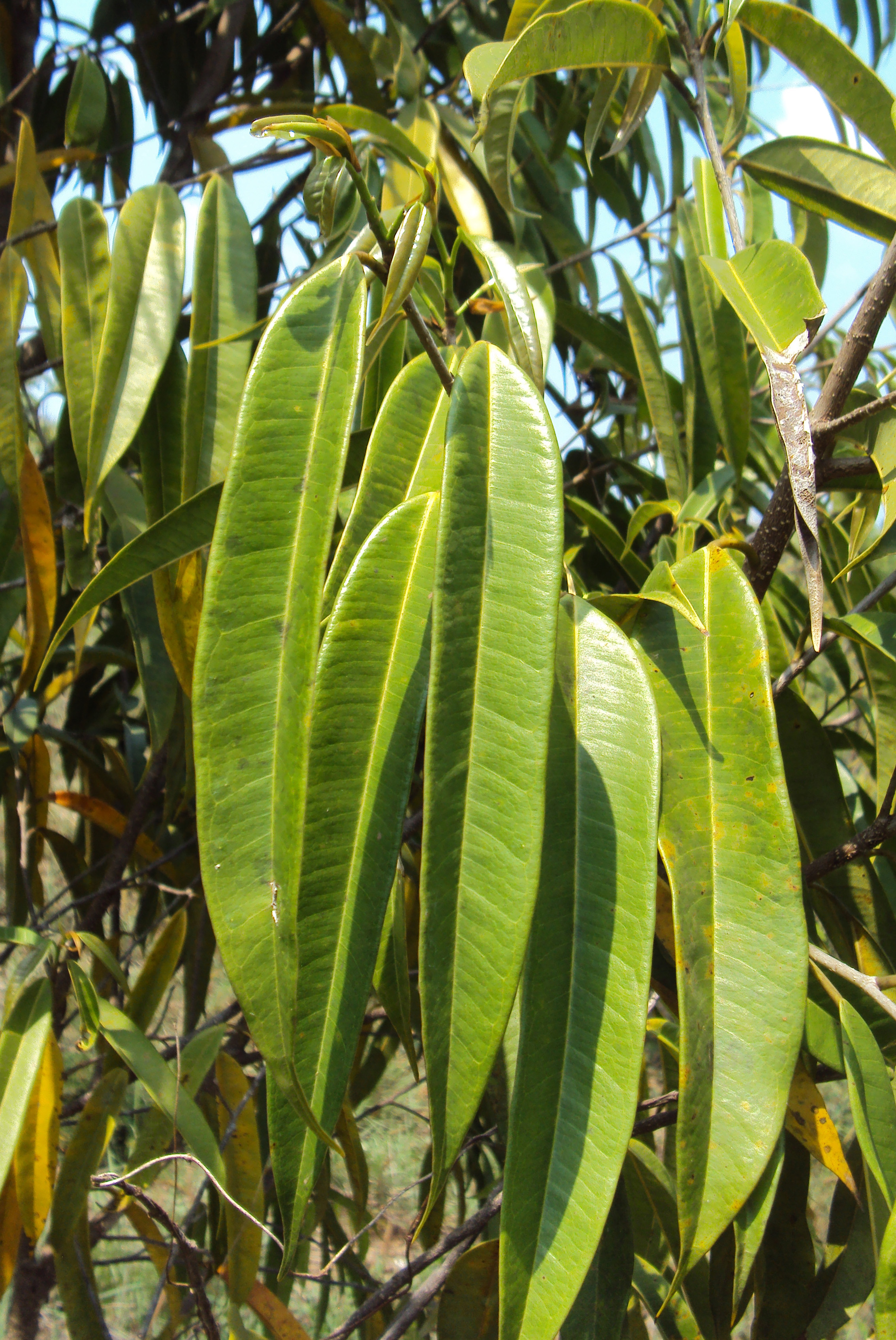

Conservation status
- Least Concern (IUCN 3.1)

Scientific classification
- Kingdom: Plantae
- Clade: Tracheophytes
- Clade: Angiosperms
- Clade: Eudicots
- Clade: Rosids
- Order: Rosales
- Family: Moraceae
- Genus: Ficus
- Subgenus: F. subg. Urostigma
- Species: F. longifolia

Binomial name
- Ficus longifolia Schott

Synonyms
- Ficus brasiliensis Link; Ficus caballina Standl.; Ficus noronhae Oliv.; Ficus ramiflora Standl.; Ficus tamatamae Pittier; Urostigma longifolium (Schott) Miq.

= Ficus longifolia =

Narrow leaf fig

Species of plant

Ficus longifolia, the narrow leaf fig, is a species of fig tree native to tropical South America, ranging from Colombia and Venezuela to Peru, Bolivia, and southeastern Brazil, where it grows in tropical moist forest. This plant is used for medicine and food, and is well known as an ornamental.

The species was first described by Heinrich Wilhelm Schott in 1827.
