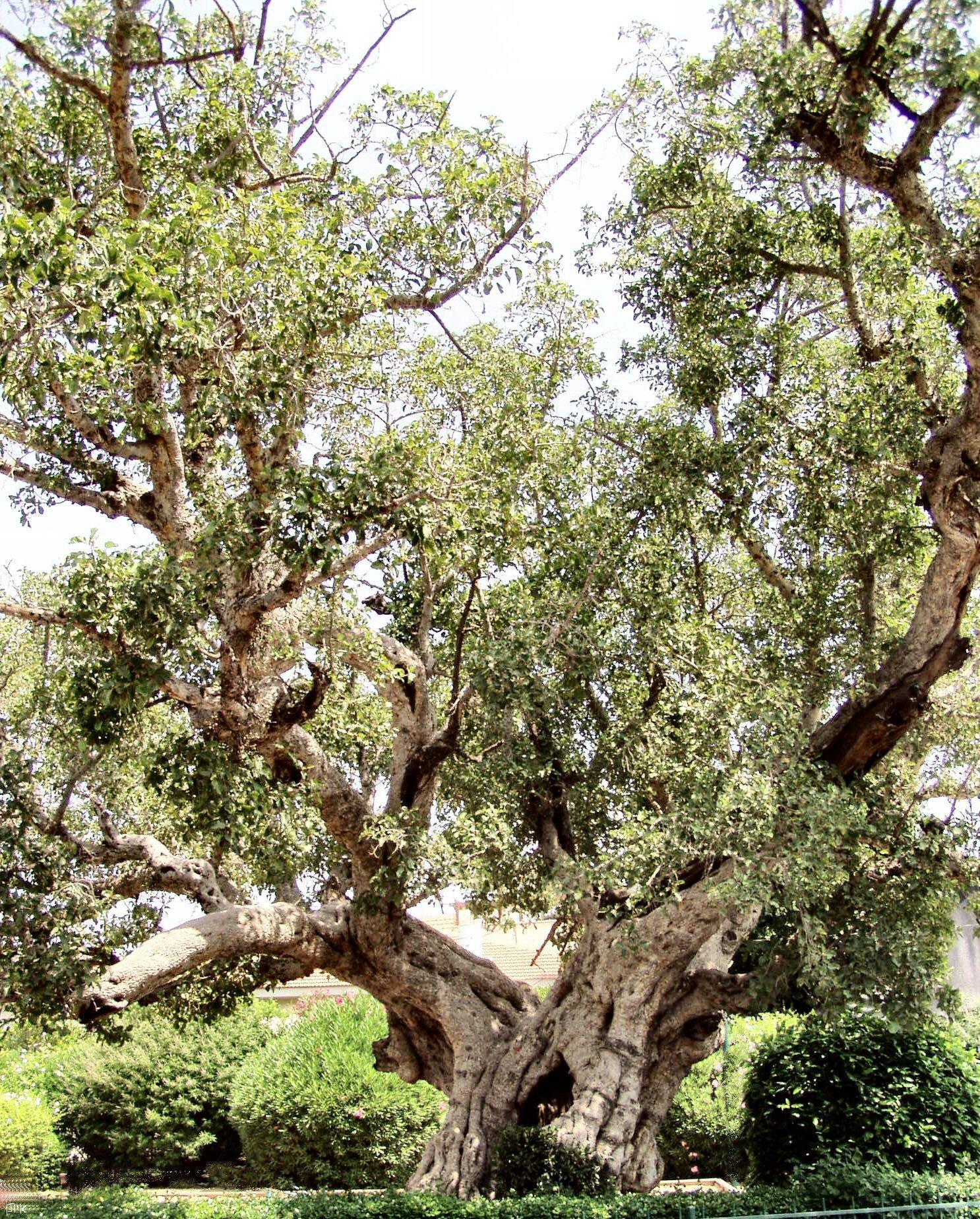
- Sycamore fig, Ficus sycomorus

Scientific classification
- Kingdom: Plantae
- Clade: Tracheophytes
- Clade: Angiosperms
- Clade: Eudicots
- Clade: Rosids
- Order: Rosales
- Family: Moraceae
- Tribe: Ficeae; Dumort.
- Genus: Ficus; L.

Type species
- Ficus carica L.

Species
- About 800, see List of Ficus species

Synonyms
- 28 synonyms: Boscheria Carruth.; Bosscheria de Vriese & Teijsm.; Caprificus Gasp.; Covellia Gasp.; Cystogyne Gasp.; Dammaropsis Warb.; Erosma Booth; Erythrogyne Vis.; Galoglychia Gasp.; Gonosuke Raf.; Macrophthalma Gasp.; Mastosuke Raf.; Necalistis Raf.; Oluntos Raf.; Perula Raf.; Pharmacosycea Miq.; Plagiostigma Zucc.; Pogonotrophe Miq.; Rephesis Raf.; Stilpnophyllum (Endl.) Drury; Sycomorphe Miq.; Sycomorus Gasp.; Synoecia Miq.; Tenorea Gasp.; Tremotis Raf.; Urostigma Gasp.; Varinga Raf.; Visiania Gasp.

= Ficus =

Ficus Temporal range: Maastrichtian–Present

Genus of flowering plants in the mulberry family

Ficus (/ˈfaɪkəs/ or /ˈfiːkəs/) is a genus of about 850 species of woody trees, shrubs, vines, epiphytes and hemiepiphytes in the family Moraceae. Collectively known as fig trees or figs, they are native throughout the tropics with a few species extending into the semi-warm temperate zone. Many Ficus species are grown for their fruits, though only two species, the common fig (F. carica) and sycamore fig (F. sycomorus), are cultivated to any extent, with common fig being the type species and by far the most important. The fruit of most other species are also edible though they are usually of only local economic importance or eaten as bushfood. However, they are extremely important food resources for wildlife. Figs are also of considerable cultural importance throughout the tropics, both as objects of worship and for their many practical uses.

== Description ==
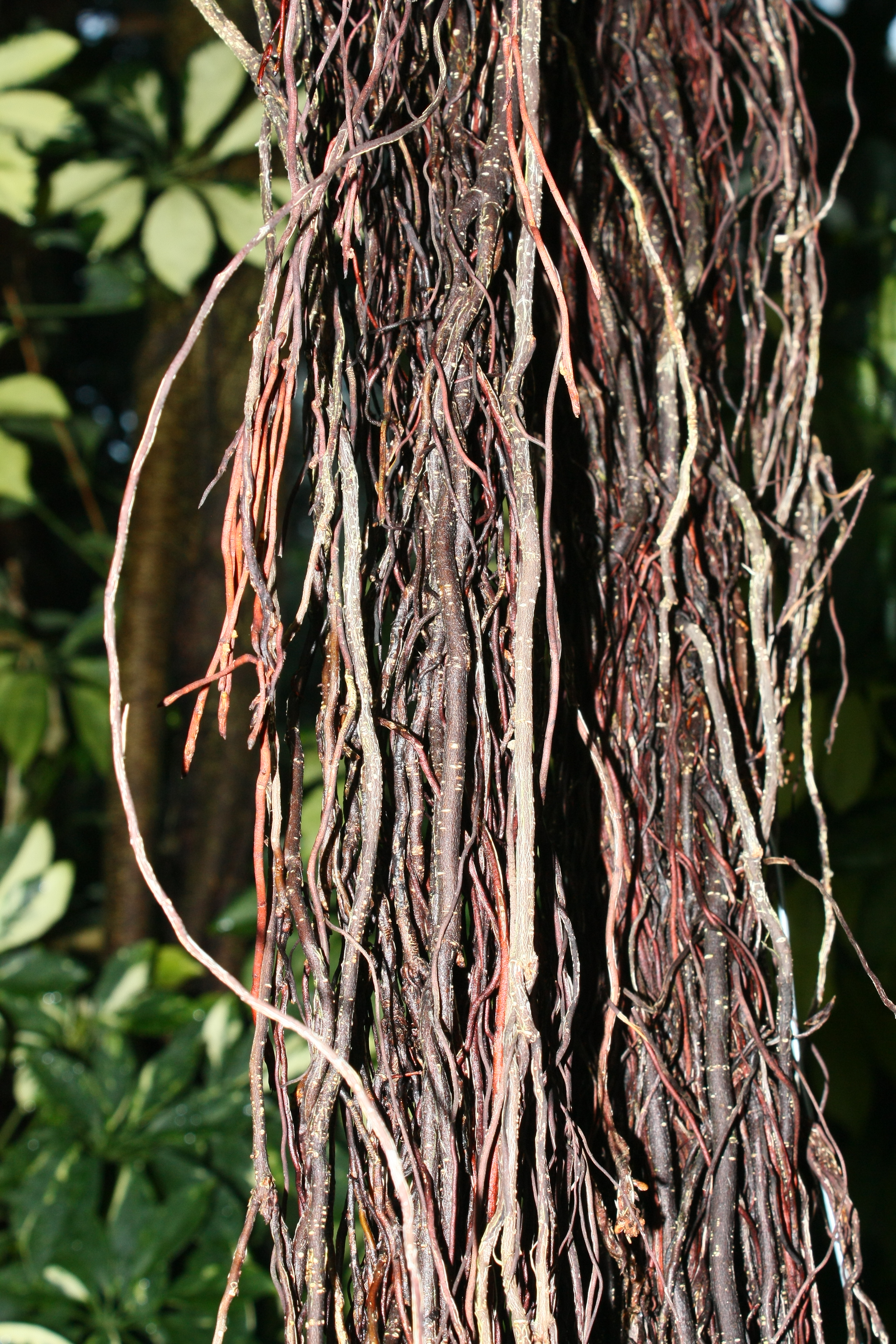
Aerial roots that may eventually provide structural support

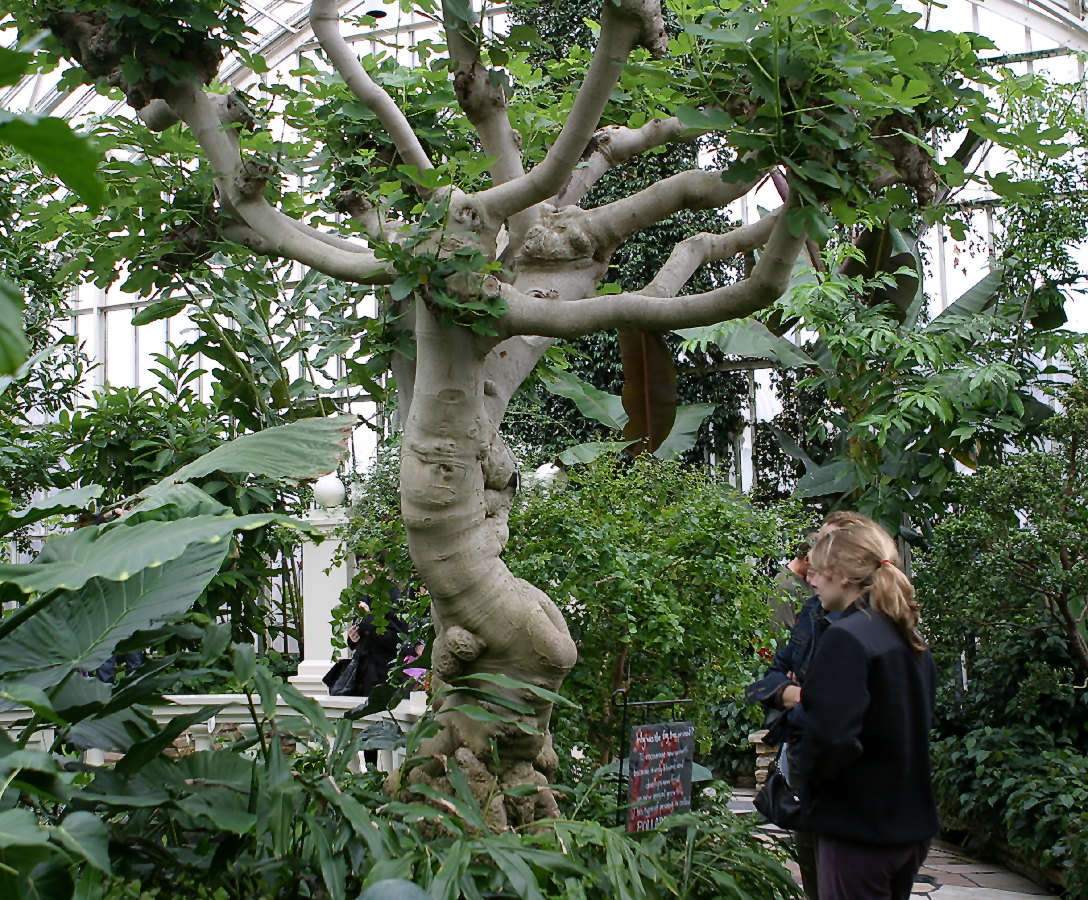
A Ficus carica (common fig)

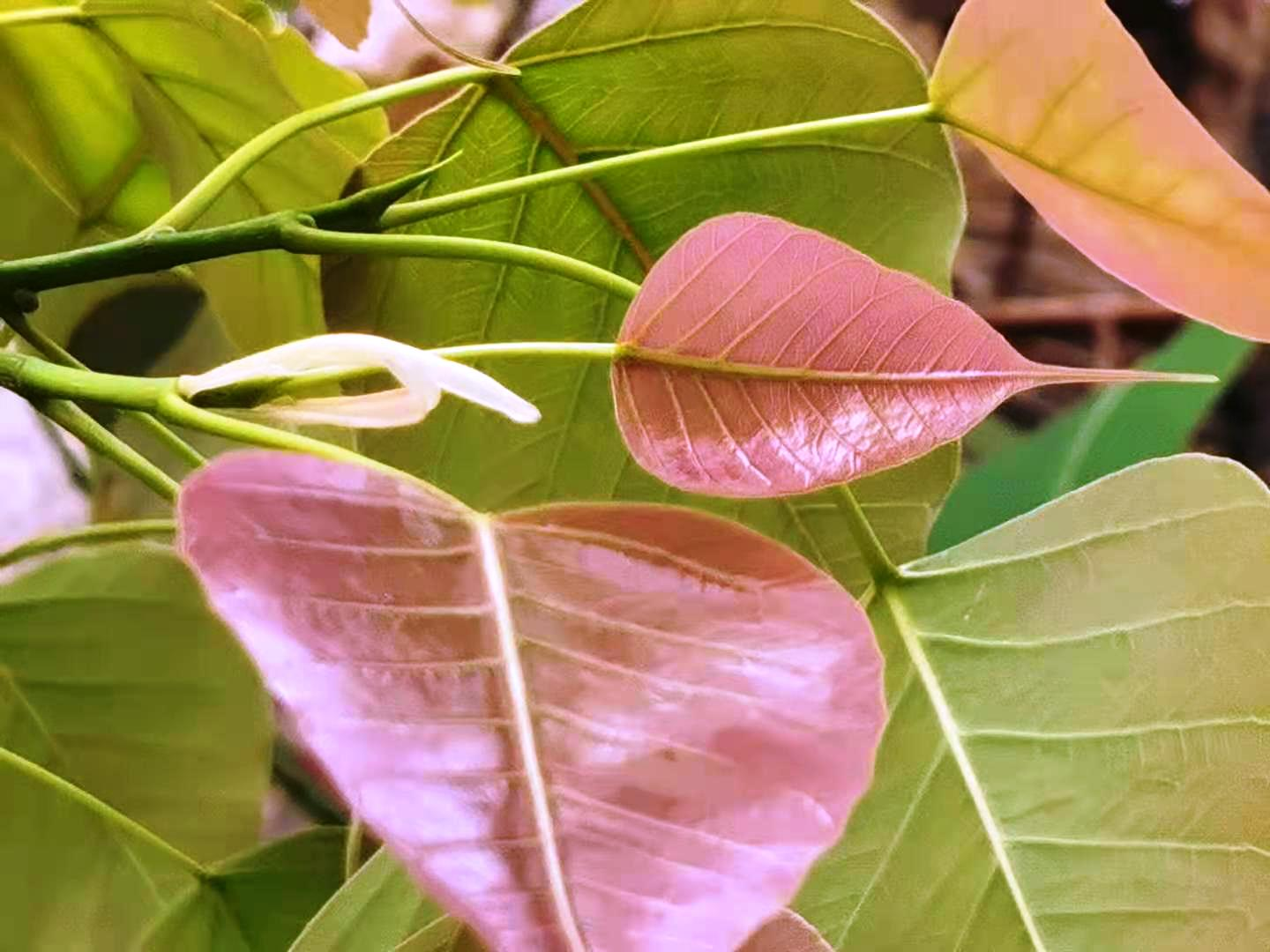
The stipule of Ficus religiosa. The white stipule contains a new leaf and a new stipule.

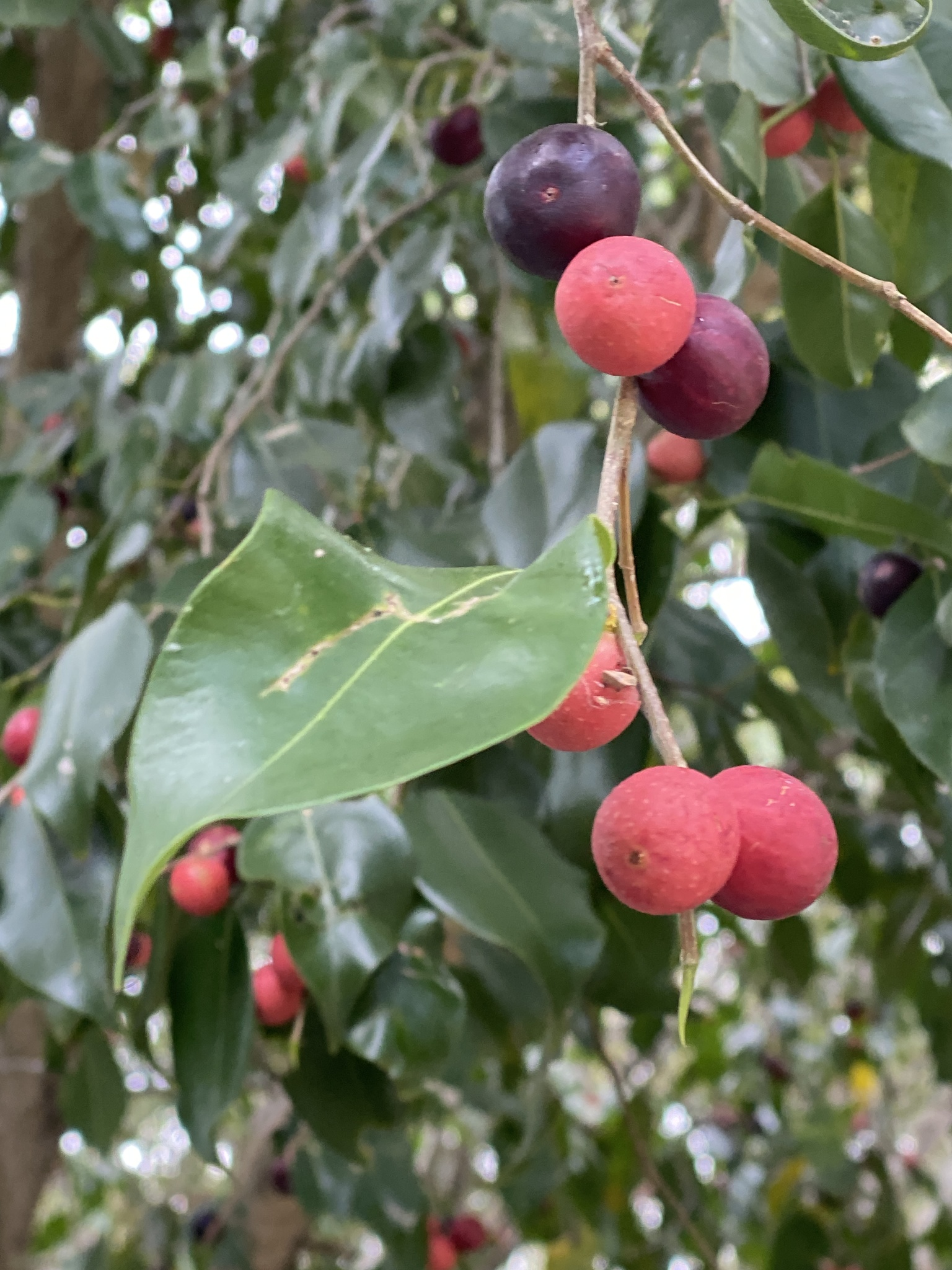
Ficus benjamina ripening fruit

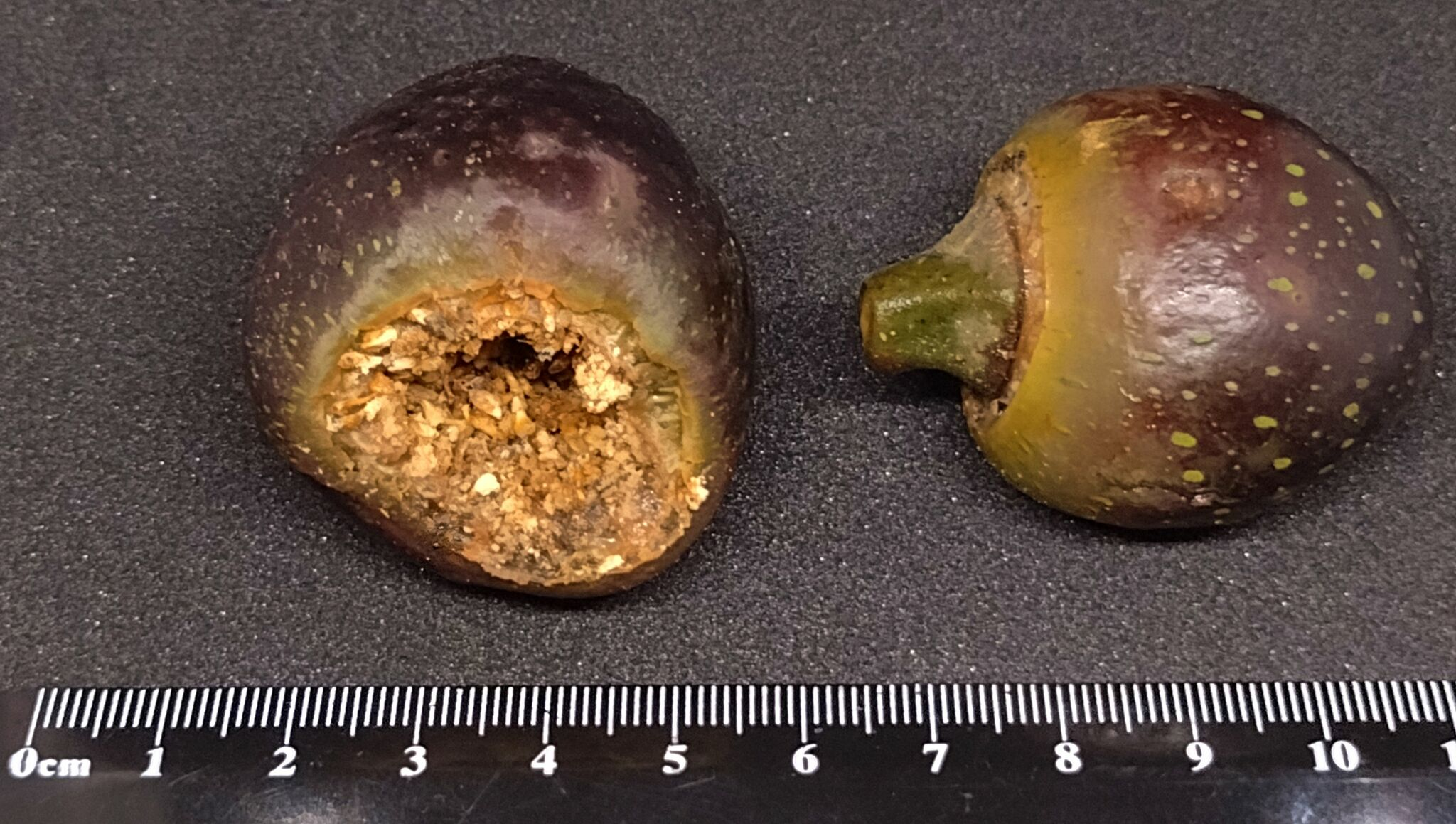
Ficus watkinsiana fruit

Ficus is a pantropical genus of trees, shrubs, and vines occupying a wide variety of ecological niches; most are evergreen, but some deciduous species grow outside the tropics or at higher elevations. Individual species vary greatly. For example, the Indian banyan (F. benghalensis), with its extensive adventitious roots, can cover over a hectare (2.5 acres), while F. nana of New Guinea never exceeds one meter (forty inches) in height and width.

Fig species are characterized by their unique syconium, an urn-shaped inflorescence that encloses numerous tiny flowers. These flowers develop into multiple ovaries on the inner surface, so the fig “fruit” is essentially a fleshy stem containing many small, coalescing flowers. Pollination is highly specialized, relying on wasps of the family Agaonidae.

Specific identification of many of the species can be difficult, but members of the genus Ficus are relatively easy to recognize. Many have aerial roots, that can be 50 m (160 ft) in length, a distinctive shape or habit, and distinguishable fruits. Notably, three vegetative traits together are unique to figs: a white to yellowish latex (sometimes abundant), paired stipules or stipular scars on the twigs, and "triveined" leaves, in which the lateral veins at the leaf base form a tighter angle with the midrib.

Some better-known species that represent the diversity of the genus include, alongside the common fig, whose fingered fig leaf is well known in art and iconography: the weeping fig (F. benjamina), a hemiepiphyte with thin, tough leaves on pendulous stalks adapted to its rain forest habitat; the rough-leaved sandpaper figs from Australia; and the creeping fig (F. pumila), a vine whose small, hard leaves form a dense carpet of foliage over rocks or garden walls.

== Reproductive biology ==
The syconium of Ficus species is the structure that develops into the fig "fruit", a type of multiple fruit, if pollinated. It is a hollow, fleshy receptacle containing tiny flowers on its inner surface, accessible only through a small opening at the apex called the ostiole lined by bracts. Inside the syconium, numerous tiny unisexual flowers line the inner wall. Male (staminate) flowers are usually positioned near the ostiole, while female (pistillate) flowers occupy the interior surface. In some cases, however, male flowers may be scattered among the female flowers. Pollination occurs when pollen is carried through the ostiole and deposited onto the receptive stigmas of the female flowers. This process naturally occurs when very small wasps such as Pegoscapus crawl through the opening in search of a suitable place to lay eggs.

Once a pollen grain lands on the stigma, it germinates and produces a pollen tube that grows down through the style to reach the ovule. After fertilization, each fertilized ovule develops into a small, one-seeded fruitlet. Because many female flowers are present, one fig may contain hundreds or even thousands of fruitlets. As they develop, the surrounding receptacles enlarge and become fleshy, forming the fig "fruit". The seeds formed through sexual reproduction are later dispersed by animals that consume the fruit.

In addition to sexual reproduction, figs can also reproduce vegetatively. Particularly in cultivation, vegetative propagation methods such as cuttings, layering, grafting are used to preserve desirable traits and ensure uniformity. This is especially important in varieties that produce seedless fruits due to a parthenocarpic mutation, where the syconium develops without fertilization. Because these fruits lack viable seeds, propagation must be carried out vegetatively.

=== Sexual system ===
Ficus species are classified as either monoecious or gynodioecious. In monoecious species, male and female flowers occur together in the same syconium, allowing a single plant to reproduce. In gynodioecious species, however, the sexes are separated on different trees. Male trees bear syconia containing male (staminate) flowers and short-styled female (pistillate) flowers, while female trees only have long-styled female flowers. The long-styled flowers tend to prevent wasps from laying their eggs within the ovules, while the short-styled flowers are accessible for egg laying.

== Ecology ==
Figs are keystone species in many tropical forest ecosystems. Their fruit are a key resource for frugivores including fruit bats, capuchin monkeys, langurs, gibbons, and mangabeys. They are even more important for birds such as Asian barbets, pigeons, hornbills, fig-parrots, and bulbuls, which may subsist almost entirely on figs when these are plentiful. Many Lepidoptera caterpillars feed on fig leaves, for example several Euploea species (crow butterflies), the plain tiger (Danaus chrysippus), the giant swallowtail (Papilio cresphontes), the brown awl (Badamia exclamationis), and Chrysodeixis eriosoma, Choreutidae and Copromorphidae moths. The larvae of the citrus long-horned beetle (Anoplophora chinensis), for example, feed on the wood of the fig tree; the species can become a pest in fig plantations. Similarly, the sweet potato whitefly (Bemisia tabaci) is frequently found as a pest on figs grown as potted plants and can be spread through the export of these plants to other localities.

=== Mutualism with the pollinating fig wasps ===
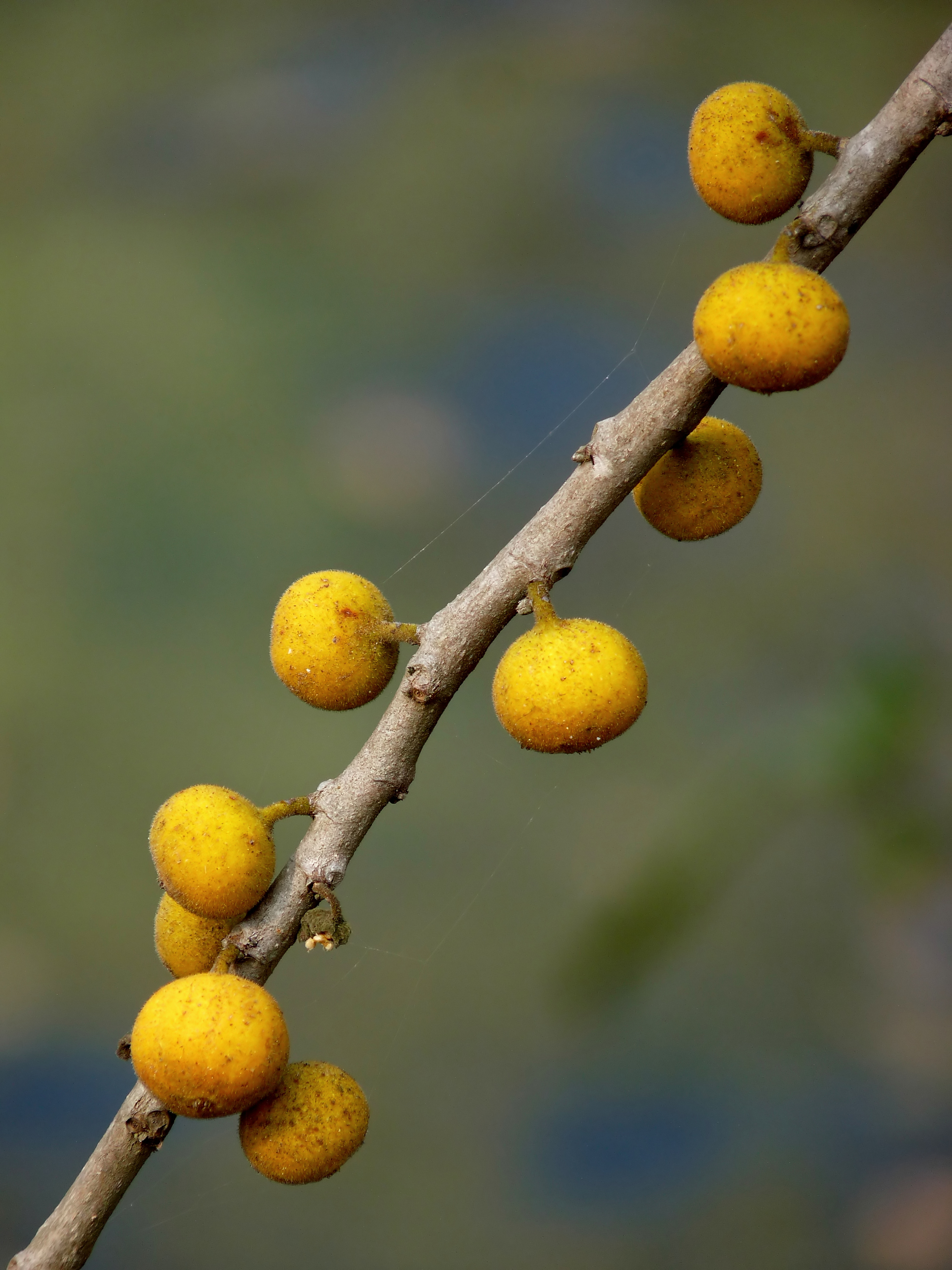
Ficus exasperata, fruits

The unique fig pollination system involves tiny, highly specific wasps, known as fig wasps, that enter via ostiole these subclosed inflorescences to both pollinate and lay their own eggs. Each species of fig is pollinated by one or a few specialised wasp species, and therefore plantings of fig species outside of their native range results in effectively sterile individuals. For example, in Hawaii, some 60 species of figs have been introduced, but only four of the wasps that fertilize them, so only those species of figs produce viable seeds there and can become invasive species. This is an example of mutualism, in which each organism (fig plant and fig wasp) benefit each other, in this case reproductively.

The intimate association between fig species and their wasp pollinators, along with the high incidence of a one-to-one plant-pollinator ratio have long led scientists to believe that figs and wasps are a clear example of coevolution. Morphological and reproductive behavior evidence, such as the correspondence between fig and wasp larvae maturation rates, have been cited as support for this hypothesis for many years. Additionally, recent genetic and molecular dating analyses have shown a very close correspondence in the character evolution and speciation phylogenies of these two clades.

According to meta-analysis of molecular data for 119 fig species 35% (41) have multiple pollinator wasp species. The real proportion is higher because not all wasp species were detected. On the other hand, species of wasps pollinate multiple host fig species. Molecular techniques, like microsatellite markers and mitochondrial sequence analysis, allowed a discovery of multiple genetically distinct, cryptic wasp species. Not all these cryptic species are sister taxa and thus must have experienced a host fig shift at some point. These cryptic species lacked evidence of genetic introgression or backcrosses indicating limited fitness for hybrids and effective reproductive isolation and speciation.

The existence of cryptic species suggests that neither the number of symbionts nor their evolutionary relationships are necessarily fixed ecologically. While the morphological characteristics that facilitate the fig-wasp mutualisms are likely to be shared more fully in closer relatives, the absence of unique pairings would make it impossible to do a one-to-one tree comparison and difficult to determine cospeciation.

=== Calcium-oxalate fixation ===
Several species of Ficus have been observed to sequester atmospheric CO_{2} as calcium oxalate in the presence of oxalotrophic bacteria and fungi, which catabolize the oxalate, to produce calcium carbonate. The calcium carbonate is precipitated throughout the tree, which also increases the alkalinity of the surrounding soil. This process was first observed in the Iroko tree, which can sequester up to a ton of calcium carbonate in the soil over its lifespan. These species are current candidates for carbon sequestration agroforestry.

== Systematics ==
With over 800 species, Ficus is the largest genus in the flowering plant family Moraceae. The first subdivision of Ficus based on leaf morphology was proposed by Carl Peter Thunberg in 1786. In 1844, Guglielmo Gasparrini proposed to divide the species now included in Ficus into several separate genera, providing the basis for a subgeneric classification when Friedrich Miquel reunited these groups into one genus in 1867. Miquel's classification put functionally dioecious species into four subgenera based on floral characters. In 1965, E. J. H. Corner reorganized the genus on the basis of breeding system, uniting these four dioecious subgenera into a single dioecious subgenus Ficus. Monoecious figs were classified within the subgenera Urostigma, Pharmacosycea and Sycomorus. The revised classification proposed by Cornelis Berg and Corner (2005) recognized six subgenera: Pharmacosycea, Urostigma, Ficus, Sycidium, Synoecia and Sycomorus.

This traditional classification has been called into question by recent phylogenetic studies employing genetic methods to investigate the relationships between representative members of the various sections of each subgenus. Of Corner's original subgeneric divisions of the genus, only Sycomorus is supported as monophyletic in the majority of phylogenetic studies. Notably, there is no clear split between dioecious and monoecious lineages. One of the two sections of Pharmacosycea, a monoecious group, form a monophyletic clade basal to the rest of the genus, which includes the other section of Pharmacosycea, the rest of the monoecious species, and all of the dioecious species. These remaining species are divided into two main monophyletic lineages (though the statistical support for these lineages is not as strong as for the monophyly of the more derived clades within them). One consists of all sections of Urostigma except for section Urostigma s. s.. The other includes section Urostigma s. s., subgenus Sycomorus, and the species of subgenus Ficus, though the relationships of the sections of these groups to one another are not well resolved.

== Selected species ==
Ficus species are found worldwide, mainly in tropical and subtropical regions. As of July 2025, there are 881 accepted Ficus species according to Plants of the World Online. Most species occur in the Indo-Australasian region, with about 511 species, making it the main center of diversity. The highest diversity is in Southeast Asia, New Guinea, and Borneo. About 132 species grow in the Neotropical region (Central and South America). In the Afrotropical region, including Madagascar, around 112 species are recognized, with 36 found in southern Africa and 25 native to South Africa. In New Guinea alone, there are 175 species of ficus. In the tropical forest, Ficus is often the most species-rich plant genus, particularly in Asia. This species richness declines with an increase in latitude in both hemispheres. Molecular clock estimates indicate that Ficus is a relatively ancient genus, being at least 60 million years old, and possibly up to 80 million years old. However, the major diversification of living species likely occurred more recently, between 20 and 40 million years ago.

=== Subgenus Ficus ===
- Ficus amplissima Sm. – bat fig
- Ficus carica L. – common fig
- Ficus daimingshanensis Chang
- Ficus deltoidea Jack – mistletoe fig
- Ficus erecta Thunb. – Japanese fig
- Ficus fulva Reinw. ex Blume
- Ficus grossularioides Burman f. – white-leaved fig
- Ficus neriifolia Sm.
- Ficus palmata Forssk.
- Ficus pandurata Hance
- Ficus simplicissima Lour.
- Ficus triloba Buch.-Ham. ex Voigt

=== Subgenus Pharmacosycea ===
- Ficus crassiuscula Standl.
- Ficus gigantosyce Dugand
- Ficus insipida Willd.
- Ficus lacunata Kvitvik
- Ficus maxima Mill.
- Ficus mutabilis Bureau
- Ficus nervosa Heyne ex Roth
- Ficus pulchella Schott
- Ficus yoponensis Desv.

=== Subgenus Sycidium ===
- Ficus andamanica Corner
- Ficus aspera G.Forst.
- Ficus assamica Miq.
- Ficus bojeri Baker
- Ficus capreifolia Delile
- Ficus coronata Spin – creek sandpaper fig
- Ficus fraseri Miq. – shiny sandpaper fig
- Ficus heterophylla L.f.
- Ficus lateriflora Vahl
- Ficus montana Burm.f. – oakleaf fig
- Ficus opposita Miq. – sweet sandpaper fig
- Ficus phaeosyce K.Schum. & Lauterb.
- Ficus tinctoria G.Forst. – dye fig
- Ficus ulmifolia Lam.
- Ficus wassa Roxb.

=== Subgenus Sycomorus ===
- Ficus auriculata Lour. – Roxburgh fig
- Ficus bernaysii King
- Ficus dammaropsis Diels – highland breadfruit, kapiak
- Ficus fistulosa Blume
- Ficus hispida L.
- Ficus nota Merr. – tibig
- Ficus pseudopalma Blanco
- Ficus racemosa L. – cluster fig
- Ficus septica Burm.f. – hauli tree
- Ficus sycomorus L. – sycamore fig (Africa)
- Ficus variegata Blume

=== Subgenus Synoecia ===
The following species are typically spreading or climbing lianas:

- Ficus hederacea Roxb.
- Ficus pantoniana King – climbing fig
- Ficus pumila L. – creeping fig
  - Ficus pumila var. awkeotsang (Makino) Corner – jelly fig
- Ficus punctata Thunb.
- Ficus sagittata J. König ex Vahl
- Ficus sarmentosa Buch.-Ham. ex Sm.
- Ficus trichocarpa Blume
- Ficus villosa Blume

=== Subgenus Urostigma ===
- Ficus abutilifolia Miq.
- Ficus albert-smithii Standl.
- Ficus altissima Blume
- Ficus amazonica Miq.
- Ficus americana Aubl.
- Ficus aripuanensis Berg & Kooy
- Ficus arpazusa Carauta and Diaz – Brazil
- Ficus aurea Nutt. – Florida strangler fig
- Ficus benghalensis L. – Indian banyan
- Ficus benjamina L. – weeping fig
- Ficus bizanae Hutch. & Burtt-Davy
- Ficus blepharophylla Vázquez Avila
- Ficus broadwayi Urb.
- Ficus burtt-davyi Hutch.
- Ficus calyptroceras Miq.
- Ficus castellviana Dugand
- Ficus catappifolia Kunth & Bouché
- Ficus citrifolia Mill. – short-leaved fig
- Ficus consociata Bl.
- Ficus cordata Thunb.
- Ficus costata Ait.
- Ficus crassipes F.M.Bailey – round-leaved banana fig
- Ficus craterostoma Mildbr. & Burret
- Ficus cyathistipula Warb.
- Ficus cyclophylla (Miq.) Miq.
- Ficus dendrocida Kunth
- Ficus depressa Bl.
- Ficus destruens F.White
- Ficus drupacea Thunb.
- Ficus elastica Hornem. – rubber plant
- Ficus exasperata Vahl.
- Ficus faulkneriana Berg
- Ficus fergusonii (King) T.B.Worth. ex Corner
- Ficus glaberrima Blume
- Ficus glumosa Delile
- Ficus greiffiana Dugand
- Ficus henneana Miq.
- Ficus hirsuta Schott
- Ficus ilicina Miq.
- Ficus kurzii King
- Ficus luschnathiana Miq.
- Ficus ingens Miq.
- Ficus krukovii Standl.
- Ficus lacor Buch.-Ham.
- Ficus lapathifolia Miq.
- Ficus lauretana Vázquez Avila
- Ficus longifolia Schott – narrow leaf fig
- Ficus lutea Vahl
- Ficus lyrata Warb. – fiddle-leaved fig, native to western Africa
- Ficus maclellandii King – Alii fig
- Ficus macrophylla Desf. ex Pers. – Moreton Bay fig
- Ficus malacocarpa Standl.
- Ficus mariae Berg, Emygdio & Carauta
- Ficus mathewsii Miq.
- Ficus matiziana Dugand
- Ficus microcarpa L. – Chinese banyan
- Ficus muelleriana Berg
- Ficus natalensis Hochst. – Natal fig
- Ficus obliqua G.Forst. – small-leaved fig
- Ficus obtusifolia Kunth
- Ficus pakkensis Standl.
- Ficus pallida Vahl
- Ficus panurensis Standl.
- Ficus pertusa L.f.
- Ficus petiolaris Kunth
- Ficus pisocarpa Bl.
- Ficus platypoda Cunn. – desert fig
- Ficus pleurocarpa DC. – banana fig
- Ficus polita Vahl
- Ficus religiosa L. – sacred fig
- Ficus roraimensis Berg
- Ficus rubiginosa Desf. – Port Jackson fig
- Ficus rumphii Blume
- Ficus salicifolia Vahl – willow-leaved fig
- Ficus sansibarica Warb.
- Ficus schippii Standl.
- Ficus schultesii Dugand
- Ficus schumacheri Griseb.
- Ficus sphenophylla Standl.
- Ficus stuhlmannii Warb.
- Ficus subcordata Bl.
- Ficus subpisocarpa Gagnep.
- Ficus subpuberula Corner
- Ficus sumatrana Miq.
- Ficus superba Miq.
- Ficus thonningii Blume
- Ficus trichopoda Baker
- Ficus trigona L.f.
- Ficus trigonata L.
- Ficus triradiata Corner – red-stipule fig
- Ficus ursina Standl.
- Ficus velutina Willd.
- Ficus verruculosa Warb.
- Ficus virens Aiton – white fig
- Ficus watkinsiana F.M.Bailey – Watkins' fig

=== Unplaced species ===
- Ficus callosa Willd.
- Ficus geniculata Kurz. – putkal
- Ficus hebetifolia
- Ficus punctata
- Ficus salomonensis
- Ficus tsjakela Burm.f.
- Ficus vogeliana

== Uses ==
The wood of fig trees is often soft and the latex precludes its use for many purposes. It was used to make mummy caskets in Ancient Egypt. Certain fig species (mainly F. cotinifolia, F. insipida and F. padifolia) are traditionally used in Mesoamerica to produce papel amate (Nahuatl: āmatl). Mutuba (F. natalensis) is used to produce barkcloth in Uganda. One of the standard kbach rachana decorative elements in Cambodian architecture was inspired by the shapes of the leaves of Pou (F. religiosa). Indian banyan (F. benghalensis) and the Indian rubber plant, as well as other species, have use in herbalism. The inner bark of an unknown type of wild fig, locally known as urú, was once used by the Moré people of Bolivia to produce a fibrous cloth used for clothing. The tree is also used in urban planning for purposes of shade and beauty. In Tel Aviv, Israel, this species is one of a group of old, protected tree species which serve as an iconic landscaping element.

=== Cultivation ===
Figs have played an important role in human culture since prehistoric times. Archaeological evidence indicates that the common fig (F. carica) and sycamore fig (F. sycomorus), were among the earliest plant species deliberately bred for agriculture in the Middle East over 11,000 years ago. Nine subfossil F. carica figs dated to about 9400–9200 BCE were discovered in the early Neolithic site of Gilgal I in the Jordan Valley, predating the earliest known grain cultivation in the region by many hundreds of years. Fig cultivation was documented in the 12th-century agricultural work Book on Agriculture by Ibn al-'Awwam. Today, numerous species of fig are found in cultivation in domestic and office environments, including:

- F. carica, common fig – hardy to −10 °C (14 °F). Grown outdoors in mild temperate regions for fruits. Many cultivars.
- F. benjamina, weeping fig, ficus – hardy to 5 °C (41 °F). Popular indoor plant. Several cultivars.
- F. elastica, rubber plant – hardy to 10 °C (50 °F): Popular houseplant. Several cultivars.
- F. lyrata, fiddle-leaf fig (banjo fig) – hardy to 10 °C (50 °F)
- F. maclellandii – hardy to 5 °C (41 °F)
- F. microcarpa, Indian laurel – hardy to 10 °C (50 °F)
- F. pumila, creeping fig – hardy to 1 °C (34 °F)
- F. rubiginosa, Port Jackson fig – hardy to 10 °C (50 °F)

=== Cultural significance ===
Fig trees have profoundly influenced culture through several religious and cultural traditions, and several species are regarded as sacred. The sacred fig (F. religiosa) is especially important in Asia. In Buddhism, it is believed that Gautama Buddha attained bodhi (enlightenment) after meditating beneath the Bodhi tree for 49 days. After destroyed in seventh century, a branch of the original tree was planted in Anuradhapura, Sri Lanka, approximately in the third century BCE. In Hinduism, the same species is known as the Ashvattha, which is revered as a sacred "world tree". The Plaksa Pra-sravana was said to be a fig tree between the roots of which the Sarasvati River sprang forth; it is usually held to be a sacred fig but more probably is Ficus virens. In Jainism, the consumption of any fruit belonging to this genus is prohibited. The common fig is one of two significant trees in Islam, and there is a sura in Quran named "The Fig" or At-Tin (سوره تین). The common fig tree is first mentioned in the Bible when Adam and Eve, after gaining knowledge of their nakedness, sew fig leaves together for coverings. Throughout the Hebrew Bible, the fig tree symbolizes peace, prosperity, and divine blessing. It is often paired with the grapevine as a key agricultural product of ancient Israel and is listed among the Seven Species with which the land was blessed. Its sweet fruit was highly valued, and the tree appears in parables and prophetic texts, sometimes as a symbol of abundance, and at other times, when withered or destroyed, as a metaphor for judgment and desolation. In Christianity, Jesus is hungry, and curses a fig tree for not providing figs, saying that nobody should ever eat from the tree's fruit again.The next day, they passed by the same fig tree and saw that it had withered from the bottom up. Jesus used this as a metaphor for believing that one's prayers will be answered. The fig tree was sacred in ancient Greece and Cyprus, where it was a symbol of fertility.

== Famous fig trees ==
- Ashvattha – the world tree of Hinduism, held to be a supernatural F. religiosa
- Bodhi tree – a F. religiosa
- Charybdis Fig Tree of Homer's Odyssey, presumably a F. carica
- Curtain Fig Tree – a F. virens
- Ficus Ruminalis – a F. carica
- Plaksa – another supernatural fig in Hinduism; usually identified as F. religiosa but is probably F. virens
- Santa Barbara's Moreton Bay Fig Tree – a F. macrophylla
- Sri Maha Bodhi – another F. religiosa, planted in 288 BCE, the oldest human-planted tree on record
- The Barren Fig Tree – Matthew 21:19 of the Christian Bible, Jesus put a curse on the tree and used this as an example for believers of the promise of the power faith in the only true God.
- The Great Banyan – a F. benghalensis, a clonal colony and once the largest organism known
- Vidurashwatha – "Vidura's Sacred Fig Tree", a village in India named after a famous F. religiosa that until recently stood there
- Wonderboom – the largest fig tree in Pretoria, South Africa, which has grown very large, through self-layering (limbs laying in the ground take root).

== See also ==
- List of Ficus diseases

== General references ==
- Berg, C.C. (28 November 2003). "Flora Malesiana Precursor for the Treatment of Moraceae 4: Ficus subgenus Synoecia". Blumea. 48 (3): 551–571. Bibcode:2003Blume..48..551B. doi:10.3767/000651903X489546.
- Berg, C.C.; Hijmann, M.E.E. (1989). "Chapter 11: Ficus". In R.M. Polhill (ed.). Flora of Tropical East Africa. pp. 43–86.
- Berg, C.C.; Corner, E.J.H. (2005). Flora malesiana. Series I, Seed plants. Volume 17. Part 2, Moraceae (Ficus). Leiden: National herbarium Nederland, Universiteit Leiden branch. ISBN 978-9-07123-661-7. OCLC 492578589.
- Carauta, Pedro; Diaz, Ernani (2002). Figueiras no Brasil. Rio de Janeiro: Editora UFRJ. ISBN 978-85-7108-250-2.
- Condit, Ira J (1969). Ficus: the exotic species. University of California, Division of Agricultural Sciences. OCLC 1086743649.
- Denisowski, Paul (2007). "Fig". Chinese–English Dictionary.
- Falistocco, Egizia (2024), "The World of Figs: An Overview", in Uthup, Thomas K.; Karumamkandathil, Rekha (eds.), Economically Important Trees: Origin, Evolution, Genetic Diversity and Ecology, Singapore: Springer Nature, pp. 261–298, doi:10.1007/978-981-97-5940-8_7, ISBN 978-981-97-5940-8
- Harrison, Rhett D (2005). "Figs and the diversity of tropical rain forests". BioScience. 55 (12): 1053–1064. doi:10.1641/0006-3568(2005)055[1053:FATDOT]2.0.CO;2.
- Kislev, Mordechai E.; Hartmann, Anat; Bar-Yosef, Ofer (2006). "Early Domesticated Fig in the Jordan Valley". Science. 312 (5778): 1372–1374. Bibcode:2006Sci...312.1372K. doi:10.1126/science.1125910. PMID 16741119. S2CID 42150441. Supporting Online Material
- Kislev, Mordechai E.; Hartmann, Anat; Bar-Yosef, Ofer (2006). "Response to Comment on "Early Domesticated Fig in the Jordan Valley"". Science. 314 (5806): 1683b. Bibcode:2006Sci...314.1683K. doi:10.1126/science.1133748. S2CID 84471716.
- Lev-Yadun, Simcha; Ne'eman, Gidi; Abbo, Shahal; Flaishman, Moshe A (2006). "Comment on "Early Domesticated Fig in the Jordan Valley"". Science. 314 (5806): 1683a. Bibcode:2006Sci...314.1683L. doi:10.1126/science.1132636. PMID 17170278. S2CID 45767896.
- Lewington, Anna; Parker, Edward (1999). Ancient trees: Trees that live for 1000 years. London: Collins & Brown. ISBN 978-18-5585-704-9.
- Rønsted, Nina; Weiblen, George D.; Cook, James M.; Salamin, Nicholas; Machado, Carlos A.; Savoainen, Vincent (2005). "60 million years of co-divergence in the fig-wasp symbiosis". Proceedings of the Royal Society B: Biological Sciences. 272 (1581): 2593–2599. doi:10.1098/rspb.2005.3249. PMC 1559977. PMID 16321781.
- Rønsted, N; Weiblen, G.D.; Clement, W.L.; Zerega, N.J.C.; Savolainen, V. (2008). "Reconstructing the phylogeny of figs (Ficus, Moraceae) to reveal the history of the fig pollination mutualism" (PDF). Symbiosis. 45. ISSN 0334-5114.
- Sarkhosh, Ali; Yavari, Alimohammad; Ferguson, Louise, eds. (2022). The fig: botany, production and uses. Wallingford: CABI. doi:10.1079/9781789242881.0000. ISBN 978-1-78924-288-1.
- Shanahan, M.; Compton, S. G.; So, Samson; Corlett, Richard (2001). "Fig-eating by vertebrate frugivores: a global review". Biological Reviews. 76 (4): 529–572. doi:10.1017/S1464793101005760. PMID 11762492. S2CID 27827864. Electronic appendices
- van Noort, Simon; van Harten, Antonius (2006). "The species richness of fig wasps (Hymenoptera: Chalcidoidea: Agaonidae, Pteromalidae) in Yemen". Fauna of Arabia. 22: 449–472.
