= Ficus consociata =

Conservation status
- Least Concern (IUCN 3.1)

Scientific classification
- Kingdom: Plantae
- Clade: Tracheophytes
- Clade: Angiosperms
- Clade: Eudicots
- Clade: Rosids
- Order: Rosales
- Family: Moraceae
- Genus: Ficus
- Subgenus: F. subg. Urostigma
- Species: F. consociata

Binomial name
- Ficus consociata Blume

Synonyms
- Ficus consociata var. murtonii King; Urostigma consociatum (Blume) Miq.

Species of banyan fig from Asia

Ficus consociata is a banyan fig species in the family Moraceae. No subspecies are listed in the Catalogue of Life. The species can be found in Indo-China (Cambodia, Myanmar, Thailand, and Vietnam) and western Malesia (Borneo, Java, Peninsular Malaysia, and Sumatra). In Vietnam it may be called đa đồng hành.

Its common name is Karet Binasah. It grows to a height of 25 meters and is pollinated by wasps.

Like Ficus elastica, it produces a latex that has been used in the production of rubber. However, it eventually fell out of favor for such a purpose, owing to the resin hardening with time.
