= Ficus lauretana =

Conservation status
- Least Concern (IUCN 3.1)

Scientific classification
- Kingdom: Plantae
- Clade: Tracheophytes
- Clade: Angiosperms
- Clade: Eudicots
- Clade: Rosids
- Order: Rosales
- Family: Moraceae
- Genus: Ficus
- Species: F. lauretana

Binomial name
- Ficus lauretana Vázq.Avila

Species of flowering plant

Ficus lauretana is a species of plant in the family Moraceae. It is a tree native to Bolivia, northern Brazil, Colombia, Ecuador, and Peru.
