= Armando Dugand =

Colombian botanist and ornithologist

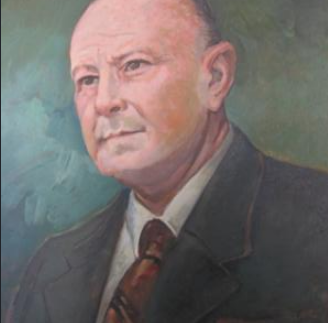
- Born: July 23, 1906; Barranquilla, Colombia
- Died: 1971 (aged 64–65)
- Occupations: Botanist, Geobotanist

Armando Dugand (July 23, 1906 – 1971) was a Colombian botanist, geobotanist, and ornithologist.

Dugand's father, François Victor (or Francisco Víctor) Dugand, was a successful French banker; his mother was Reyes Geneco (or Gnecco) Coronado. Dugand was educated in France and in the United States (at Albany Business College). In 1927 he married Sara Roncallo.

In 1940 he co-founded the scientific journal Caldasia. He also founded two other scientific journals: Mutisia (Acta Botanica Colombiana) and Lozania (Acta Zoologica Colombiana).

He was director of the Institute of Natural Sciences of the National University of Colombia from 1940 to 1953.

Dugand is commemorated in the scientific names of two snakes, Trilepida dugandi and Scaphiodontophis annulatus dugandi.
