= List of Ficus species =

This is a list of Ficus species, plants in the Moraceae family. As of July 2025 Plants of the World Online accepts 881 species.

== A ==
- Ficus abelii Miq.
- Ficus abscondita C.C.Berg
- Ficus abutilifolia (Miq.) Miq.
- Ficus acamptophylla (Miq.) Miq.
- Ficus aculeata A.Cunn. ex Miq.
- Ficus adelpha K.Schum. & Lauterb.
- Ficus adenosperma Miq.
- Ficus adhatodifolia Schott
- Ficus adolphi-friderici Mildbr.
- Ficus aequatorialis Dugand
- Ficus albert-smithii Standl.
- Ficus albipila (Miq.) King
- Ficus albomaculata C.C.Berg
- Ficus alongensis Gagnep.
- Ficus altissima Blume
- Ficus alutacea Blume
- Ficus amadiensis De Wild.
- Ficus amazonica (Miq.) André
- Ficus americana Aubl.
- Ficus ampana C.C.Berg
- Ficus ampelos Burm.f.
- Ficus amplissima Sm.
- Ficus amplocarpa Govind. & Masil.
- Ficus ampulliformis Corner
- Ficus anamalayana Sudhakar & G.V.S.Murthy
- Ficus anastomosans Wall. ex Kurz
- Ficus andamanica Corner
- Ficus androchaete Corner
- Ficus annulata Blume
- Ficus anserina (Corner) C.C.Berg
- Ficus antandronarum (H.Perrier) C.C.Berg
- Ficus apiocarpa (Miq.) Miq.
- Ficus apollinaris Dugand
- Ficus araneosa King
- Ficus arawaensis Corner
- Ficus arbuscula K.Schum. & Lauterb.
- Ficus archboldiana Summerh.
- Ficus archeri Standl.
- Ficus ardisioides Warb.
- Ficus arfakensis King
- Ficus aripuanensis C.C.Berg & Kooy
- Ficus armitii King
- Ficus arnottiana (Miq.) Miq.
- Ficus aspera G.Forst.
- Ficus asperifolia Miq.
- Ficus asperiuscula Kunth & C.D.Bouché
- Ficus asperula Bureau
- Ficus assamica Miq.
- Ficus assimilis Baker
- Ficus atricha D.J.Dixon
- Ficus aurantiacifolia Weiblen & Whitfeld
- Ficus aurata (Miq.) Miq.
- Ficus aurea Nutt.
- Ficus aureocordata Corner
- Ficus auricoma Corner ex C.C.Berg
- Ficus auriculata Lour.
- Ficus auriculigera Bureau
- Ficus aurita Blume
- Ficus austrina Corner
- Ficus austrocaledonica Bureau

== B ==
- Ficus baccaureoides Corner
- Ficus badiopurpurea Diels
- Ficus baeuerlenii King
- Ficus bahiensis C.C.Berg & Carauta
- Ficus bakeri Elmer
- Ficus balete Merr.
- Ficus balica Miq.
- Ficus bambusifolia Seem.
- Ficus banahaensis Elmer
- Ficus banosensis C.C.Berg
- Ficus baola C.C.Berg
- Ficus barba-jovis Corner
- Ficus barclayana (Miq.) Miq.
- Ficus barraui Guillaumin
- Ficus barteri Sprague
- Ficus bataanensis Merr.
- Ficus beccarii King
- Ficus beddomei King
- Ficus benghalensis L.
- Ficus benguetensis Merr.
- Ficus benjamina L.
- Ficus bernaysii King
- Ficus bhotanica King
- Ficus biakensis C.C.Berg
- Ficus binnendykii (Miq.) Miq.
- Ficus bistipulata Griff.
- Ficus bivalvata H.Perrier
- Ficus bizanae Hutch. & Burtt Davy
- Ficus blepharophylla Vázq.Avila
- Ficus boanensis C.C.Berg
- Ficus bojeri Baker
- Ficus boliviana C.C.Berg
- Ficus bonijesulapensis R.M.Castro
- Ficus boninsimae Koidz.
- Ficus borneensis Kochummen
- Ficus botryocarpa Miq.
- Ficus botryoides Baker
- Ficus bougainvillei Rech.
- Ficus brachyclada Baker
- Ficus brachypoda (Miq.) Miq.
- Ficus bracteata (Miq.) Wall. ex Miq.
- Ficus brenesii Standl.
- Ficus brevibracteata W.C.Burger
- Ficus brittonii Bold.
- Ficus broadwayi Urb.
- Ficus bruneiensis Corner
- Ficus brunneoaurata Corner
- Ficus brusii Weiblen
- Ficus bubu Warb.
- Ficus bubulia C.C.Berg
- Ficus bukitrayaensis C.C.Berg
- Ficus bullenei I.M.Johnst.
- Ficus buntaensis C.C.Berg
- Ficus burretiana Mildbr. & Hutch.
- Ficus burtt-davyi Hutch.
- Ficus bussei Warb. ex Mildbr. & Burret

== C ==
- Ficus caatingae R.M.Castro
- Ficus cahuitensis C.C.Berg
- Ficus calcarata Corner
- Ficus calcicola Corner
- Ficus caldasiana Dugand
- Ficus calimana Dugand
- Ficus callophylla Blume
- Ficus callosa Willd.
- Ficus calopilina Diels
- Ficus calyculata Mill.
- Ficus calyptrata Vahl
- Ficus calyptroceras (Miq.) Miq.
- Ficus cambodica Gagnep.
- Ficus camptandra Diels
- Ficus capillipes Gagnep.
- Ficus capreifolia Delile
- Ficus carautana L.J.Neves & Emygdio
- Ficus carchiana C.C.Berg
- Ficus carica L.
- Ficus carinata C.C.Berg
- Ficus carpentariensis D.J.Dixon
- Ficus carpenteriana Elmer
- Ficus carrii Corner
- Ficus cartagenensis Dugand
- Ficus carvajalii Pedern., Pelissari & Romaniuc
- Ficus casapiensis (Miq.) Miq.
- Ficus casearioides King
- Ficus cassidyana Elmer
- Ficus castellviana Dugand
- Ficus catappifolia Kunth & C.D.Bouché
- Ficus cataractorum Vieill. ex Bureau
- Ficus cataupi Elmer
- Ficus caulocarpa (Miq.) Miq.
- Ficus cauta Corner
- Ficus cavernicola C.C.Berg
- Ficus celebensis Corner
- Ficus cerasicarpa D.J.Dixon
- Ficus cereicarpa Corner
- Ficus ceronii C.C.Berg
- Ficus cervantesiana Standl. & L.O.Williams
- Ficus cestrifolia Schott
- Ficus chaetostyla Diels
- Ficus changii Doweld
- Ficus chapaensis Gagnep.
- Ficus chaparensis C.C.Berg & Villav.
- Ficus chaponensis Dugand
- Ficus chartacea (Wall. ex Kurz) Wall. ex King
- Ficus chiangraiensis Chantaras.
- Ficus chirindensis C.C.Berg
- Ficus chlamydocarpa Mildbr. & Burret
- Ficus christianii Carauta
- Ficus chrysochaete Corner
- Ficus chrysolepis Miq.
- Ficus cinnamomea Corner
- Ficus citrifolia Mill.
- Ficus clusiifolia Schott
- Ficus coerulescens (Rusby) Rossberg
- Ficus colobocarpa (Diels ex Corner) C.C.Berg
- Ficus colubrinae Standl.
- Ficus comitis King
- Ficus complexa Corner
- Ficus concinna (Miq.) Miq.
- Ficus congesta Roxb.
- Ficus conglobata King
- Ficus conocephalifolia Ridl.
- Ficus conraui Warb.
- Ficus consociata Blume
- Ficus cookii Standl.
- Ficus copiosa Steud.
- Ficus cordata Thunb.
- Ficus cordatula Merr.
- Ficus cornelisiana Chantaras. & Y.Q.Peng
- Ficus corneri Kochummen
- Ficus corneriana C.C.Berg
- Ficus coronata Spin
- Ficus coronulata Miq.
- Ficus costaricana (Liebm.) Miq.
- Ficus costata Aiton
- Ficus cotinifolia Kunth
- Ficus cotopaxiensis C.C.Berg
- Ficus crassicosta Warb.
- Ficus crassinervia Desf. ex Willd.
- Ficus crassipes F.M.Bailey
- Ficus crassiramea (Miq.) Miq.
- Ficus crassiuscula Warb. ex Standl.
- Ficus crassivenosa W.C.Burger
- Ficus crateriformis Pedern. & Romaniuc
- Ficus craterostoma Warb. ex Mildbr. & Burret
- Ficus cremersii C.C.Berg
- Ficus crescentioides Bureau
- Ficus crocata (Miq.) Mart. ex Miq.
- Ficus cryptosyce Corner
- Ficus cuatrecasasiana Dugand
- Ficus cucurbitina King
- Ficus cumingii Miq.
- Ficus cundinamarcensis Dugand
- Ficus cupulata Haines
- Ficus curtipes Corner
- Ficus cuspidata Reinw. ex Blume
- Ficus cyathistipula Warb.
- Ficus cyathistipuloides De Wild.
- Ficus cyclophylla (Miq.) Miq.
- Ficus cynaroides Corner
- Ficus cyrtophylla (Miq.) Miq.

== D ==
- Ficus daimingshanensis S.S.Chang
- Ficus dalbertisii King
- Ficus dalhousieae (Miq.) Miq.
- Ficus dammaropsis Diels
- Ficus davidsoniae Standl.
- Ficus decipiens Reinw. ex Blume
- Ficus delosyce Corner
- Ficus deltoidea Jack
- Ficus demeusei Warb.
- Ficus dendrocida Kunth
- Ficus densechini Corner
- Ficus densifolia Miq.
- Ficus densistipulata De Wild.
- Ficus depressa Blume
- Ficus desertorum B.C.Wilde & R.L.Barrett
- Ficus destruens F.Muell. ex C.T.White
- Ficus detonsa Corner
- Ficus devestiens Corner
- Ficus dewolfii Pedern. & Romaniuc
- Ficus diamantina A.F.P.Machado & L.P.Queiroz
- Ficus diamantiphylla Corner
- Ficus diandra Corner
- Ficus dicranostyla Mildbr.
- Ficus dimorpha King
- Ficus dinganensis S.S.Chang
- Ficus dissipata Corner
- Ficus disticha Blume
- Ficus distichoidea Diels
- Ficus diversiformis Miq.
- Ficus dodsonii C.C.Berg
- Ficus donnell-smithii Standl.
- Ficus drupacea Thunb.
- Ficus dryepondtiana L.Gentil
- Ficus duartei C.C.Berg & Carauta
- Ficus duckeana C.C.Berg & J.E.L.Ribeiro
- Ficus dugandii Standl.
- Ficus dulciaria Dugand
- Ficus dzumacensis Guillaumin

== E ==
- Ficus ecuadorensis C.C.Berg
- Ficus edanoi Merr.
- Ficus edelfeltii King
- Ficus elastica Roxb. ex Hornem.
- Ficus elasticoides De Wild.
- Ficus eliadis Standl.
- Ficus elmeri Merr.
- Ficus endochaete Summerh.
- Ficus endospermifolia Corner
- Ficus enormis (Miq.) Miq.
- Ficus erecta Thunb.
- Ficus erinobotrya Corner
- Ficus ernanii Carauta, Pederneir., P.P.Souza, A.F.P.Machado, M.D.M.Vianna
- Ficus erythrosperma Miq.
- Ficus esquirolii H.Lév. & Vaniot
- Ficus eumorpha Corner
- Ficus eustephana Diels
- Ficus exasperata Vahl
- Ficus excavata King
- Ficus eximia Schott

== F ==
- Ficus faulkneriana C.C.Berg
- Ficus fengkaiensis Doweld
- Ficus fergusonii (King) T.B.Worth. ex Corner
- Ficus filicauda Hand.-Mazz.
- Ficus fischeri Warb. ex Mildbr. & Burret
- Ficus fiskei Elmer
- Ficus fistulosa Reinw. ex Blume
- Ficus flagellaris Diels
- Ficus flavistipulata C.C.Berg
- Ficus floccifera Diels
- Ficus floresana C.C.Berg
- Ficus formosana Maxim.
- Ficus forstenii Miq.
- Ficus francisci H.J.P.Winkl.
- Ficus francoae C.C.Berg
- Ficus fraseri Miq.
- Ficus fresnoensis Dugand
- Ficus fulva Reinw. ex Blume
- Ficus fulvopilosa Summerh.
- Ficus funiculicaulis C.C.Berg
- Ficus funiculosa Corner
- Ficus fuscata Summerh.
- Ficus fusuiensis S.S.Chang

== G ==
- Ficus gamostyla Kochummen
- Ficus garcia-barrigae Dugand
- Ficus geniculata Kurz
- Ficus geocarpa Teijsm. ex Miq.
- Ficus geocharis Corner
- Ficus gibbsiae Ridl.
- Ficus gigantifolia Merr.
- Ficus gigantosyce Dugand
- Ficus gilapong Miq.
- Ficus glaberrima Blume
- Ficus glabristipulata C.C.Berg
- Ficus glandifera Summerh.
- Ficus glandulifera (Miq.) Wall. ex King
- Ficus glareosa Elmer
- Ficus globosa Blume
- Ficus glumosa Delile
- Ficus godeffroyi Warb.
- Ficus goiana C.C.Berg, Carauta & A.F.P.Machado
- Ficus goldmanii Standl.
- Ficus gomelleira Kunth & C.D.Bouché
- Ficus goniophylla Corner
- Ficus gorontaloensis C.C.Berg & Culmsee
- Ficus gracillima Diels
- Ficus granatum G.Forst.
- Ficus grandiflora Corner
- Ficus gratiosa Corner
- Ficus greenwoodii Summerh.
- Ficus grevei Baill.
- Ficus grewiifolia Blume
- Ficus griffithii (Miq.) Miq.
- Ficus grossularioides Burm.f.
- Ficus gryllus Corner
- Ficus guangxiensis S.S.Chang
- Ficus guaranitica Chodat
- Ficus guatiquiae Dugand
- Ficus guayaquilensis Dugand
- Ficus guianensis Desv.
- Ficus guizhouensis X.S.Zhang
- Ficus gul K.Schum. & Lauterb.
- Ficus guntheri J.H.Torres
- Ficus guttata (Wight) Wight ex King
- Ficus gymnorygma Summerh.

== H ==
- Ficus habrophylla G.Benn. ex Seem.
- Ficus hadroneura Diels
- Ficus hahliana Diels
- Ficus halmaherae Corner
- Ficus hartwegii Miq.
- Ficus hatschbachii C.C.Berg & Carauta
- Ficus hebetifolia Dugand
- Ficus hederacea Roxb.
- Ficus hemsleyana King
- Ficus henneana Miq.
- Ficus henryi Warb. ex Diels
- Ficus hesperidiiformis King
- Ficus heteromorpha Hemsl.
- Ficus heterophylla L.f.
- Ficus heteropleura Blume
- Ficus heteropoda Miq.
- Ficus heteroselis Bureau
- Ficus heterostyla Merr.
- Ficus hirsuta Schott
- Ficus hispida L.f.
- Ficus holosericea Schott
- Ficus hombroniana Corner
- Ficus hondurensis Standl. & L.O.Williams
- Ficus hookeriana Corner
- Ficus hotteana Ekman ex Rossbach
- Ficus humbertii C.C.Berg
- Ficus hurlimannii Guillaumin
- Ficus hygrophila Rech.
- Ficus hypobrunnea Corner
- Ficus hypogaea King
- Ficus hypophaea Schltr. ex Diels
- Ficus hystricicarpa Warb.

== I ==
- Ficus ihuensis Summerh.
- Ficus iidaiana Rehder & E.H.Wilson
- Ficus ilias-paiei Kochummen
- Ficus ilicina (Sond.) Miq.
- Ficus illiberalis Corner
- Ficus imbricata Corner
- Ficus immanis Corner
- Ficus inaequifolia Elmer
- Ficus inaequipetiolata Merr.
- Ficus indigofera Rech.
- Ficus ingens (Miq.) Miq.
- Ficus insculpta Summerh.
- Ficus insipida Willd.
- Ficus intramarginalis Miq.
- Ficus involucrata Blume
- Ficus iodotricha Diels
- Ficus ischnopoda Miq.
- Ficus isophlebia Standl.
- Ficus itoana Diels
- Ficus ixoroides Corner

== J ==
- Ficus jacobii Vázq.Avila
- Ficus jacobsii C.C.Berg
- Ficus jaheriana Corner
- Ficus jambiensis C.C.Berg
- Ficus jansii Boutique
- Ficus jaramilloi Dugand
- Ficus jarawae G.K.Upadhyay & Chakrab.
- Ficus jimiensis C.C.Berg
- Ficus jingningensis X.D.Mei, Z.H.Chen & G.Y.Li
- Ficus johannis Boiss.
- Ficus juglandiformis King

== K ==
- Ficus kalimantana C.C.Berg
- Ficus kamerunensis Warb. ex Mildbr. & Burret
- Ficus karthalensis C.C.Berg
- Ficus katendei Verdc.
- Ficus kerkhovenii Koord. & Valeton
- Ficus kjellbergii Corner
- Ficus kochummeniana C.C.Berg
- Ficus kofmaniae C.C.Berg
- Ficus koutumensis Corner
- Ficus krishnae C.DC.
- Ficus krugiana Warb.
- Ficus krukovii Standl.
- Ficus kuchinensis C.C.Berg
- Ficus kurzii King

== L ==
- Ficus lacor Buch.-Ham.
- Ficus laevicarpa Elmer
- Ficus laevis Blume
- Ficus lagoensis C.C.Berg & Carauta
- Ficus lamponga Miq.
- Ficus lanata Blume
- Ficus lancibracteata Corner
- Ficus langkokensis Drake
- Ficus lapathifolia (Liebm.) Miq.
- Ficus lasiocarpa Miq.
- Ficus lasiosyce J.A.González & Poveda
- Ficus lateriflora Vahl
- Ficus latimarginata Corner
- Ficus latipedunculata Pedern., Romaniuc & Mansano
- Ficus laureola Warb. ex C.C.Berg & Carauta
- Ficus lauretana Vázq.Avila
- Ficus laurifolia Lam.
- Ficus lawesii King
- Ficus lawrancei Standl.
- Ficus lecardii Warb.
- Ficus lehmannii Standl.
- Ficus leiocarpa (Bureau) Warb.
- Ficus leonensis Hutch.
- Ficus lepicarpa Blume
- Ficus leptocalama Corner
- Ficus leptoclada Benth.
- Ficus leptodictya Diels
- Ficus leptogramma Corner
- Ficus lidaoprostrata S.S.Ying
- Ficus lifouensis Corner
- Ficus lilliputiana D.J.Dixon
- Ficus limosa C.C.Berg
- Ficus lindsayana Beentje
- Ficus linearifolia Elmer
- Ficus lingua Warb. ex De Wild. & T.Durand
- Ficus litseifolia Corner
- Ficus longecuspidata Warb.
- Ficus longibracteata Corner
- Ficus longifolia Schott
- Ficus longistipulata Kochummen
- Ficus louisii Boutique & J.Léonard
- Ficus lowii King
- Ficus lumutana C.C.Berg
- Ficus luschnathiana (Miq.) Miq.
- Ficus lutea Vahl
- Ficus lyrata Warb.

== M ==
- Ficus macbridei Standl.
- Ficus machetana Dugand
- Ficus machupicchuensis C.C.Berg
- Ficus macilenta King
- Ficus maclellandii King
- Ficus macrophylla Pers.
- Ficus macropodocarpa H.Lév. & Vaniot
- Ficus macrorrhyncha Lauterb. & K.Schum.
- Ficus macrostyla Corner
- Ficus macrosyce Pittier
- Ficus macrothyrsa Corner
- Ficus madagascariensis C.C.Berg
- Ficus magdalenica Dugand
- Ficus magnoliifolia Blume
- Ficus magwana C.C.Berg
- Ficus maialis Guillaumin
- Ficus maitin Pittier
- Ficus malayana C.C.Berg & Chantaras.
- Ficus manuselensis C.C.Berg
- Ficus mariae C.C.Berg, Emygdio & Carauta
- Ficus marmorata Bojer ex Baker
- Ficus maroma A.Cast.
- Ficus maroniensis Benoist
- Ficus masonii Horne ex Baker
- Ficus matanoensis C.C.Berg
- Ficus mathewsii (Miq.) Miq.
- Ficus matiziana Dugand
- Ficus mauritiana Lam.
- Ficus maxima Mill.
- Ficus maximoides C.C.Berg
- Ficus megaleia Corner
- Ficus megalophylla Diels
- Ficus melinocarpa Blume
- Ficus membranacea C.Wright
- Ficus menabeensis H.Perrier
- Ficus merrittii Merr.
- Ficus mexicana (Miq.) Miq.
- Ficus microcarpa L.f.
- Ficus microdictya Diels
- Ficus microsphaera Warb.
- Ficus microsyce Ridl.
- Ficus microtophora Corner
- Ficus middletonii Chantaras.
- Ficus midotis Corner
- Ficus minahassae (de Vriese & Teijsm.) Miq.
- Ficus miqueliana C.C.Berg
- Ficus mollicula Pittier
- Ficus mollior F.Muell. ex Benth.
- Ficus mollis Vahl
- Ficus mollissima Ridl.
- Ficus montana Burm.f.
- Ficus morobensis C.C.Berg
- Ficus motuoensis Zhen Zhang & Hong Qing Li
- Ficus mucuso Welw. ex Ficalho
- Ficus muelleriana C.C.Berg
- Ficus multistipularis Merr.
- Ficus muricata Zhen Zhang & Hong Qing Li
- Ficus mutabilis Bureau
- Ficus mutisii Dugand
- Ficus myiopotamica C.C.Berg

== N ==
- Ficus nana Corner
- Ficus napoensis S.S.Chang
- Ficus nasuta Summerh.
- Ficus natalensis Hochst.
- Ficus nebulosilvana N.Medina
- Ficus neriifolia Sm.
- Ficus nervosa Roth
- Ficus nhatrangensis Gagnep.
- Ficus nigropunctata Warb. ex Mildbr. & Burret
- Ficus nigrotuberculata Pelissari & Romaniuc
- Ficus nishimurae Koidz.
- Ficus nitidifolia Bureau
- Ficus nota (Blanco) Merr.
- Ficus novae-georgiae Corner
- Ficus novahibernica Corner
- Ficus nymphaeifolia Mill.

== O ==
- Ficus obliqua G.Forst.
- Ficus obpyramidata King
- Ficus obscura Blume
- Ficus obtusifolia Kunth
- Ficus obtusiuscula (Miq.) Miq.
- Ficus ocoana Dugand
- Ficus odoardi King
- Ficus odorata (Blanco) Merr.
- Ficus oleifolia King
- Ficus oleracea Corner
- Ficus opposita Miq.
- Ficus oreodryadum Mildbr.
- Ficus oreophila Ridl.
- Ficus oresbia C.C.Berg
- Ficus orocuensis Dugand
- Ficus orthoneura H.Lév. & Vaniot
- Ficus osensis C.C.Berg
- Ficus otophora Corner & Guillaumin
- Ficus otophoroides Corner
- Ficus ottoniifolia (Miq.) Miq.
- Ficus ovatacuta Corner
- Ficus oxymitroides Corner

== P ==
- Ficus pachyclada Baker
- Ficus pachyneura C.C.Berg
- Ficus pachyrrhachis K.Schum. & Lauterb.
- Ficus pachysycia Diels ex Corner
- Ficus padana Burm.f.
- Ficus pakkensis Standl.
- Ficus pallescens (Weiblen) C.C.Berg
- Ficus pallida Vahl
- Ficus palmarensis N.Medina
- Ficus palmata Forssk.
- Ficus paludica Standl.
- Ficus pancheriana Bureau
- Ficus pandurata Hance
- Ficus pantoniana King
- Ficus panurensis Standl.
- Ficus paoana C.C.Berg
- Ficus papuana Corner
- Ficus paracamptophylla Corner
- Ficus paraensis (Miq.) Miq.
- Ficus parietalis Blume
- Ficus parvibracteata Corner
- Ficus pastasana C.C.Berg
- Ficus patellata Corner
- Ficus pedunculosa Miq.
- Ficus pellucidopunctata Griff.
- Ficus pendens Corner
- Ficus peninsula Elmer ex C.C.Berg
- Ficus perfulva Elmer ex Merr.
- Ficus periptera D.Fang & D.H.Qin
- Ficus pertusa L.f.
- Ficus petiolaris Kunth
- Ficus phaeobullata Corner
- Ficus phaeosyce K.Schum. & Lauterb.
- Ficus phanrangensis Gagnep.
- Ficus phatnophylla Diels
- Ficus pilulifera Corner
- Ficus pisocarpa Blume
- Ficus platyphylla Delile
- Ficus platypoda (Miq.) A.Cunn. ex Miq.
- Ficus plectonervata N.Medina
- Ficus pleiadenia Diels
- Ficus pleurocarpa F.Muell.
- Ficus pleyteana Corner
- Ficus podocarpifolia Corner
- Ficus polita Vahl
- Ficus politoria Lam.
- Ficus polyantha Warb.
- Ficus polynervis S.S.Chang
- Ficus polyphlebia Baker
- Ficus pongumphaii Chantaras. & Sungkaew
- Ficus popayanensis Standl.
- Ficus popenoei Standl.
- Ficus populifolia Vahl
- Ficus porata C.C.Berg
- Ficus porphyrochaete Corner
- Ficus porrecta (Corner) C.C.Berg
- Ficus praestans Corner
- Ficus praetermissa Corner
- Ficus prasinicarpa Elmer ex C.C.Berg
- Ficus preussii Warb.
- Ficus primaria Corner
- Ficus pringlei S.Watson
- Ficus pritchardii Seem.
- Ficus profusa Corner
- Ficus prolixa G.Forst.
- Ficus prostrata (Wall. ex Miq.) Buch.-Ham. ex Miq.
- Ficus pseudocaulocarpa Chantaras.
- Ficus pseudoconcinna Chantaras.
- Ficus pseudojaca Corner
- Ficus pseudomangifera Hutch.
- Ficus pseudopalma Blanco
- Ficus pseudowassa Corner
- Ficus pteroporum Guillaumin
- Ficus pubigera (Wall. ex Miq.) Brandis
- Ficus pubilimba Merr.
- Ficus pubipetiola Chantaras.
- Ficus pulchella Schott
- Ficus pumila L.
- Ficus punctata Thunb.
- Ficus pungens Reinw. ex Blume
- Ficus pustulata Elmer
- Ficus pygmaea Welw. ex Hiern
- Ficus pyriformis Hook. & Arn.

== Q ==
- Ficus quercetorum Corner
- Ficus quichauensis S.S.Chang
- Ficus quichuana C.C.Berg
- Ficus quistocochensis C.C.Berg

== R ==
- Ficus racemifera Roxb.
- Ficus racemigera Bureau
- Ficus racemosa L.
- Ficus recurva Blume
- Ficus recurvata De Wild.
- Ficus reflexa Thunb.
- Ficus religiosa L.
- Ficus remifolia Corner ex C.C.Berg
- Ficus retusa L.
- Ficus rheedei J.Graham
- Ficus rhizophoriphylla King
- Ficus ribes Reinw. ex Blume
- Ficus richteri Dugand
- Ficus ridleyana C.C.Berg & Chantaras.
- Ficus rieberiana C.C.Berg
- Ficus riedelii Teijsm. ex Miq.
- Ficus rigo F.M.Bailey
- Ficus rimacana C.C.Berg
- Ficus rivularis Merr.
- Ficus robusta Corner
- Ficus romeroi Dugand
- Ficus roraimensis C.C.Berg
- Ficus rosulata C.C.Berg
- Ficus rubiginosa Desf. ex Vent.
- Ficus rubra Vahl
- Ficus rubrijuvenis Weiblen & Whitfeld
- Ficus rubrivestimenta Weiblen & Whitfeld
- Ficus rubrocuspidata Corner
- Ficus rubromidotis Corner
- Ficus rubrosyce C.C.Berg
- Ficus ruficaulis Merr.
- Ficus ruginervia Corner
- Ficus rumphii Blume
- Ficus ruspolii Warb.
- Ficus ruyuanensis X.S.Zhang

== S ==
- Ficus sabahana Kochummen
- Ficus saccata Corner
- Ficus sageretina Diels
- Ficus sagittata Vahl
- Ficus sagittifolia Warb. ex Mildbr. & Burret
- Ficus salicaria C.C.Berg
- Ficus salicifolia Vahl
- Ficus salomonensis Rech.
- Ficus samarana C.C.Berg
- Ficus samoensis Summerh.
- Ficus sandanakana C.C.Berg
- Ficus sangumae Weiblen & Whitfeld
- Ficus sansibarica Warb.
- Ficus santanderana Dugand
- Ficus sarawakensis Corner
- Ficus sarmentosa Buch.-Ham. ex Sm.
- Ficus saruensis C.C.Berg
- Ficus satterthwaitei Elmer
- Ficus saurauioides Diels
- Ficus saussureana DC.
- Ficus saxophila Blume
- Ficus scaberrima Blume
- Ficus scabra G.Forst.
- Ficus scaposa Corner
- Ficus scassellatii Pamp.
- Ficus schefferiana King
- Ficus schippii Standl.
- Ficus schumacheri (Liebm.) Griseb.
- Ficus schumanniana Warb.
- Ficus schwarzii Koord.
- Ficus sciaphila Corner
- Ficus sclerosycia C.C.Berg
- Ficus scobina Benth.
- Ficus scopulifera C.C.Berg
- Ficus scott-elliottii Mildbr. & Burret
- Ficus scratchleyana King
- Ficus segoviae Miq.
- Ficus semicordata Buch.-Ham. ex Sm.
- Ficus semivestita Corner
- Ficus septica Burm.f.
- Ficus serraria Miq.
- Ficus setiflora Stapf
- Ficus setulosa C.C.Berg
- Ficus simplicissima Lour.
- Ficus singalana King
- Ficus sinociliata Z.K.Zhou & M.G.Gilbert
- Ficus sinuata Thunb.
- Ficus sirensis Mitidieri & Pedern.
- Ficus smithii Horne ex Baker
- Ficus soatensis Dugand
- Ficus sodiroi Rossberg
- Ficus soepadmoi Kochummen
- Ficus sohotonensis C.C.Berg
- Ficus solomonensis Doweld
- Ficus sorongensis C.C.Berg
- Ficus spathulifolia Corner
- Ficus sphenophylla Standl.
- Ficus spiralis Corner
- Ficus squamosa Roxb.
- Ficus stellaris C.C.Berg
- Ficus stipata King
- Ficus stolonifera King
- Ficus storckii Seem.
- Ficus stricta (Miq.) Miq.
- Ficus stuhlmannii Warb.
- Ficus subapiculata (Miq.) Miq.
- Ficus subcaudata C.C.Berg
- Ficus subcongesta Corner
- Ficus subcordata Blume
- Ficus subcostata De Wild.
- Ficus subcuneata Miq.
- Ficus subfulva Corner
- Ficus subgelderi Corner
- Ficus subglabritepala C.C.Berg
- Ficus subincisa Buch.-Ham. ex Sm.
- Ficus sublimbata Corner
- Ficus submontana C.C.Berg
- Ficus subnervosa Corner
- Ficus subpisocarpa Gagnep.
- Ficus subpuberula Corner
- Ficus subsagittifolia Mildbr. ex C.C.Berg
- Ficus subsidens Corner
- Ficus subterranea Corner
- Ficus subtrinervia K.Schum. & Lauterb.
- Ficus subulata Blume
- Ficus suffruticosa Corner
- Ficus sulawesiana C.C.Berg & Culmsee
- Ficus sulcata Elmer
- Ficus sumacoana C.C.Berg
- Ficus sumatrana (Miq.) Miq.
- Ficus sundaica Blume
- Ficus superba (Miq.) Miq.
- Ficus supfiana Schltr. ex Diels
- Ficus supperforata Corner
- Ficus sur Forssk.
- Ficus sycomorus L.

== T ==
- Ficus talbotii King
- Ficus tamayoana Cuev.-Fig. & Carvajal
- Ficus tannoensis Hayata
- Ficus tanypoda Corner
- Ficus tarennifolia Corner
- Ficus tecolutensis (Liebm.) Miq.
- Ficus temburongensis C.C.Berg
- Ficus tenuicuspidata Corner
- Ficus tepuiensis C.C.Berg & Simonis
- Ficus tequendamae Dugand
- Ficus ternatana (Miq.) Miq.
- Ficus tesselata Warb.
- Ficus tettensis Hutch.
- Ficus thailandica C.C.Berg & S.Gardner
- Ficus theophrastoides Seem.
- Ficus thonningii Blume
- Ficus tikoua Bureau
- Ficus tiliifolia Baker
- Ficus tinctoria G.Forst.
- Ficus tonduzii Standl.
- Ficus tonsa Miq.
- Ficus torrentium H.Perrier
- Ficus torresiana Standl.
- Ficus tovarensis Pittier
- Ficus trachelosyce Dugand
- Ficus trachycoma Miq.
- Ficus trachypison K.Schum. & Lauterb.
- Ficus trapezicola Dugand
- Ficus travancorica King
- Ficus tremula Warb.
- Ficus treubii King
- Ficus trianae Dugand
- Ficus trichocarpa Blume
- Ficus trichocerasa Diels
- Ficus trichoclada Baker
- Ficus trichopoda Baker
- Ficus tricolor Miq.
- Ficus trigona L.f.
- Ficus trigonata L.
- Ficus triloba Buch.-Ham. ex Voigt
- Ficus trimenii King ex Trimen
- Ficus triradiata Corner
- Ficus tristaniifolia Corner
- Ficus trivia Corner
- Ficus tsiangii Merr. ex Corner
- Ficus tsjakela Burm.f.
- Ficus tubulosa Pelissari & Romaniuc
- Ficus tuerckheimii Standl.
- Ficus tulipifera Corner
- Ficus tunicata Corner
- Ficus tuphapensis Drake
- Ficus turrialbana W.C.Burger

== U ==
- Ficus ulei Rossberg
- Ficus ulmifolia Lam.
- Ficus umbellata Vahl
- Ficus umbonata Reinw. ex Blume
- Ficus umbrae Ezedin & Weiblen
- Ficus uncinata (King) Becc.
- Ficus uniauriculata Warb.
- Ficus uniglandulosa Wall.
- Ficus urnigera Miq.
- Ficus ursina Standl.
- Ficus usambarensis Warb.

== V ==
- Ficus vaccinioides Hemsl. & King
- Ficus valaria C.C.Berg
- Ficus vallis-caucae Dugand
- Ficus vallis-choudae Delile
- Ficus variegata Blume
- Ficus variifolia Warb.
- Ficus variolosa Lindl. ex Benth.
- Ficus vasculosa Wall. ex Miq.
- Ficus vasta Forssk.
- Ficus velutina Humb. & Bonpl. ex Willd.
- Ficus venezuelensis C.C.Berg
- Ficus vermifuga (Miq.) Miq.
- Ficus verruculosa Warb.
- Ficus versicolor Bureau
- Ficus verticillaris Corner
- Ficus vieillardiana Bureau
- Ficus villosa Blume
- Ficus virens Aiton
- Ficus virescens Corner
- Ficus virgata Reinw. ex Blume
- Ficus vitiensis Seem.
- Ficus vittata Vázq.Avila
- Ficus vogeliana (Miq.) Miq.
- Ficus vrieseana Miq.

== W ==
- Ficus wakefieldii Hutch.
- Ficus wamanguana Weiblen & Whitfeld
- Ficus warburgii Elmer
- Ficus wassa Roxb.
- Ficus watkinsiana F.M.Bailey
- Ficus webbiana (Miq.) Miq.
- Ficus wildemaniana Warb.

== X ==
- Ficus xylophylla (Miq.) Wall. ex Miq.

== Y ==
- Ficus yoponensis Desv.
- Ficus ypsilophlebia Dugand
- Ficus yunnanensis S.S.Chang

== Z ==
- Ficus zuliensis C.C.Berg & Simonis
