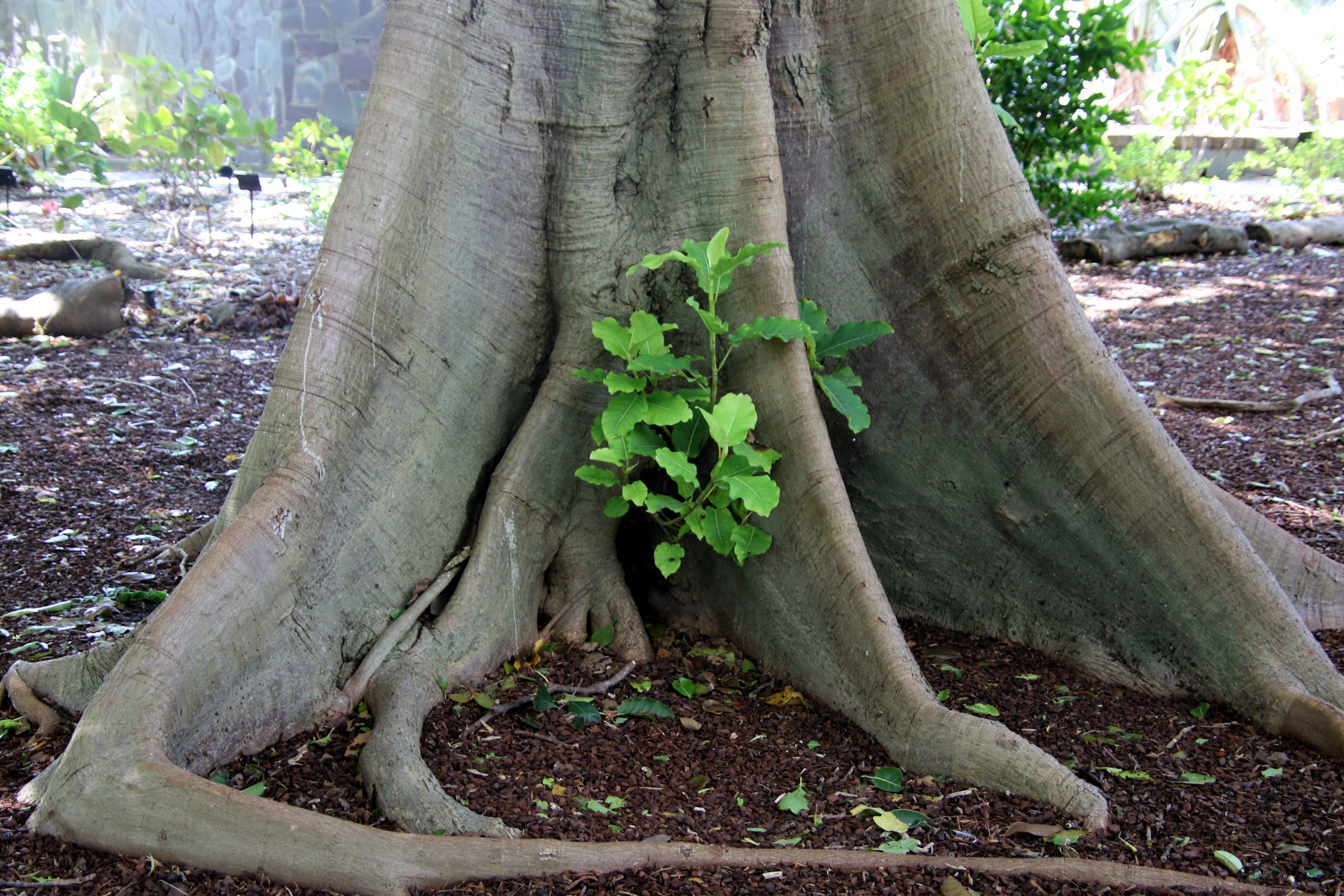

Conservation status
- Least Concern (IUCN 3.1)

Scientific classification
- Kingdom: Plantae
- Clade: Tracheophytes
- Clade: Angiosperms
- Clade: Eudicots
- Clade: Rosids
- Order: Rosales
- Family: Moraceae
- Genus: Ficus
- Species: F. nymphaeifolia

Binomial name
- Ficus nymphaeifolia Mill.

Synonyms
- Ficus anguina Benoist; Ficus duquei Dugand; Ficus duquei var. obtusiloba Dugand; Ficus ierensis Britton; Ficus involuta var. urbaniana (Warb.) Dugand; Ficus nymphoides Thunb.; Ficus urbaniana Warb.; Urostigma nymphifolium (Mill.) Miq.

= Ficus nymphaeifolia =

Species of flowering plant

Ficus nymphaeifolia is a strangler fig of the tropical Americas. It is native to Central America from Guatemala to Panama, northern South America to Bolivia and central Brazil, and the Lesser Antilles and Trinidad and Tobago in the Caribbean. Growing up to 35 metres (115 ft) tall, the habitat is coastal plains, savannah and rainforest. This plant first appeared in scientific literature in 1768. Published in The Gardeners Dictionary by the English botanist, Philip Miller from specimens collected in the Caribbean. Latex from the plant may be used in the form of a plaster, to treat sprains and fractures and cuts to the body, to offer relief from pain and to protect a wound from infection.
