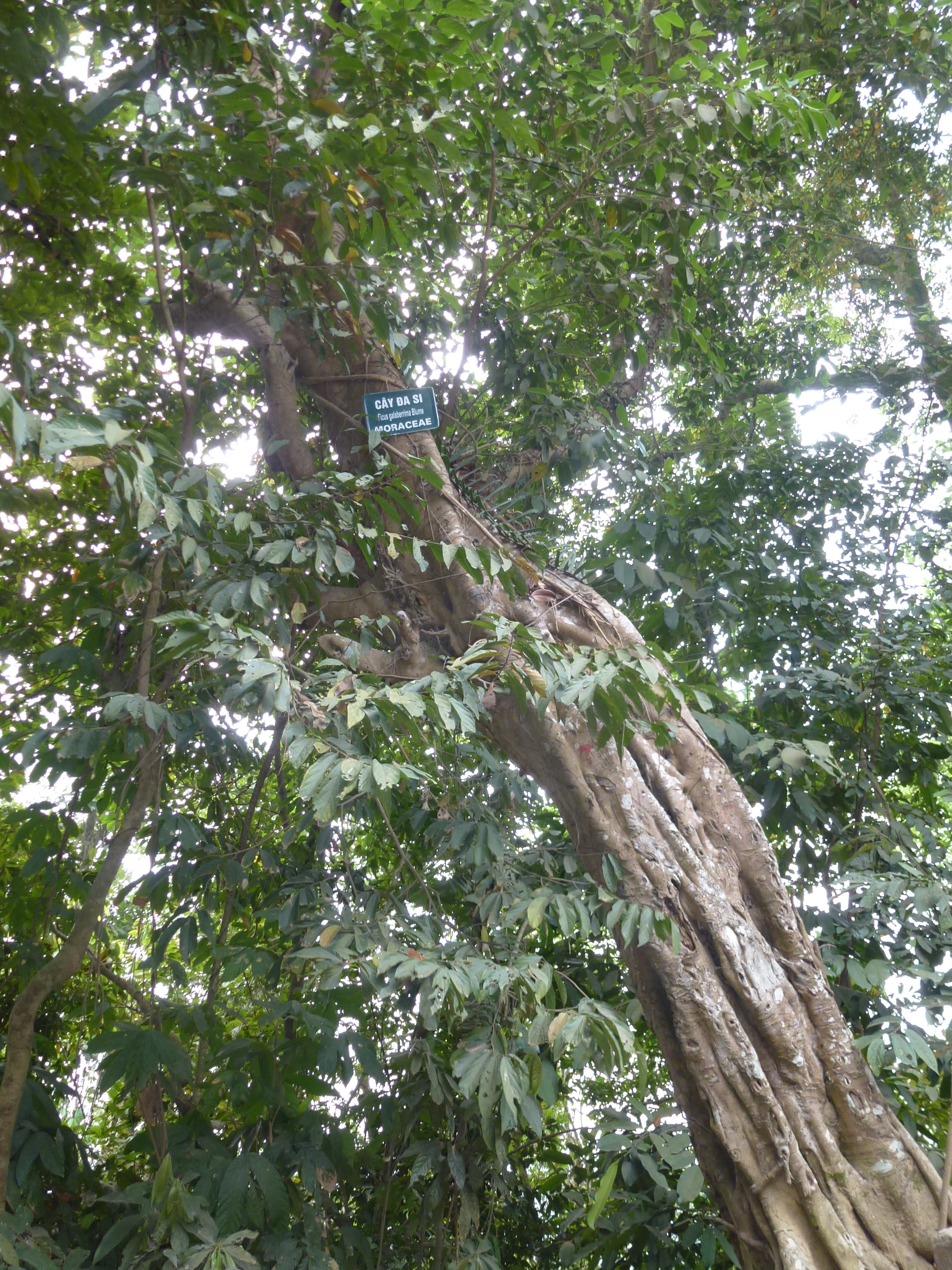

Scientific classification
- Kingdom: Plantae
- Clade: Tracheophytes
- Clade: Angiosperms
- Clade: Eudicots
- Clade: Rosids
- Order: Rosales
- Family: Moraceae
- Tribe: Ficeae
- Genus: Ficus
- Species: F. glaberrima

Binomial name
- Ficus glaberrima Blume

Synonyms
- Ficus bistipulata Griff.; Ficus feddei H.Lév. & Vaniot; Ficus fraterna Miq.; Ficus glaberrima var. pubescens S.S.Chang; Ficus suberosa H.Lév. & Vaniot; Ficus thomsonii Miq.; Ficus vaniotii H.Lév.; Urostigma glaberrimum Miq.

= Ficus glaberrima =

Species of fig

Ficus glaberrima is an Asian species of fig tree in the family Moraceae. The native range of this species is India, S. China and tropical Asia: Indo-China to the Lesser Sunda Islands (but not Borneo, Sulawesi or the Philippines). The species can be found in Vietnam: where it may be called đa trụi or đa lá xanh.

== Subspecies ==
Plants of the World Online lists:

- F. glaberrima subsp. glaberrima
- F. glaberrima subsp. siamensis (Corner) C.C.Berg

== Gallery ==
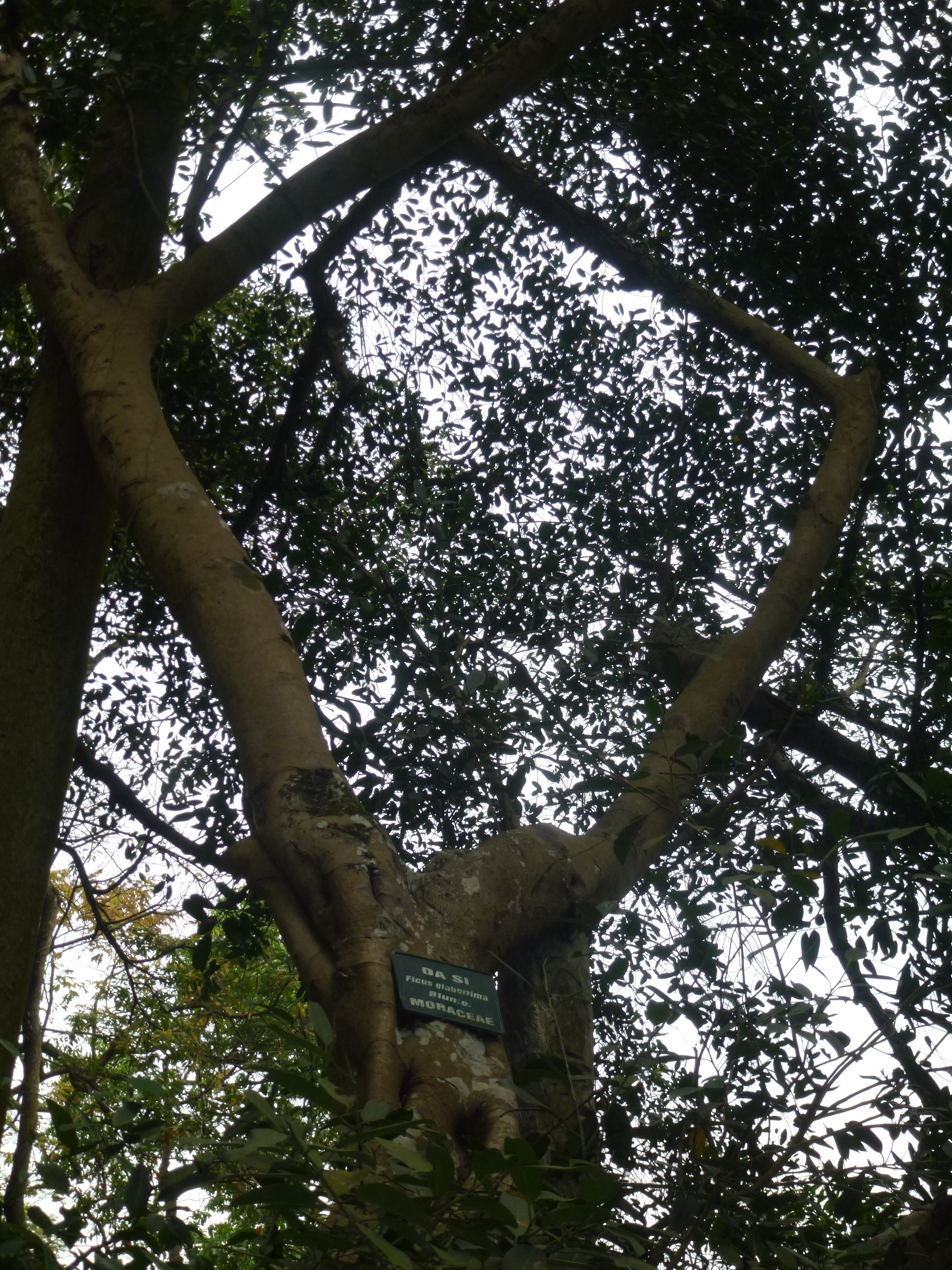

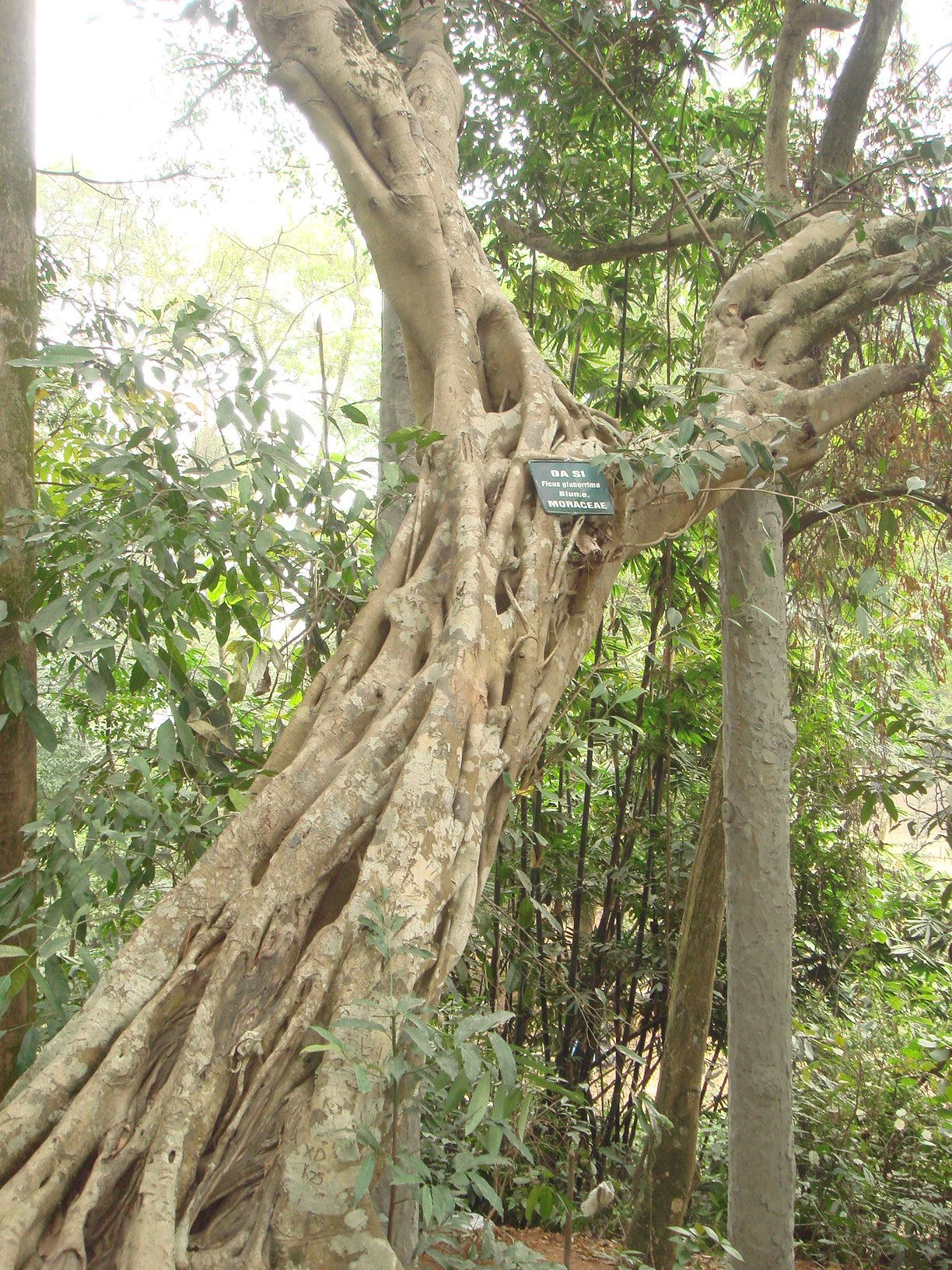
