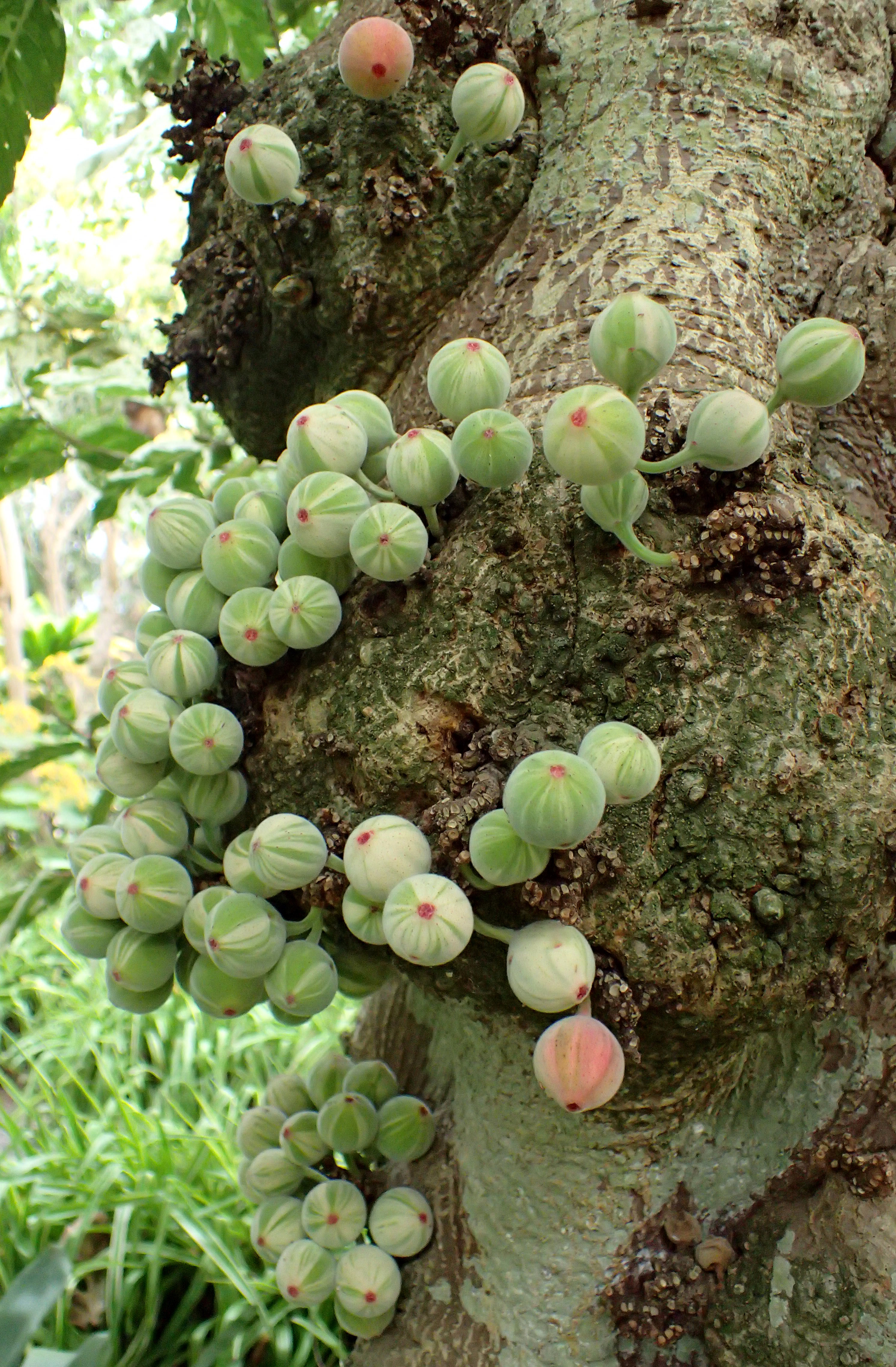

Conservation status
- Near Threatened (IUCN 3.1)

Scientific classification
- Kingdom: Plantae
- Clade: Tracheophytes
- Clade: Angiosperms
- Clade: Eudicots
- Clade: Rosids
- Order: Rosales
- Family: Moraceae
- Genus: Ficus
- Subgenus: F. subg. Sycidium
- Species: F. aspera

Binomial name
- Ficus aspera G.Forst.

Synonyms
- Artocarpus cannonii H.J.Veitch; Artocarpus exculptus W.Bull; Artocarpus laciniatus H.J.Veitch; Artocarpus laciniatus var. metallicus J.H.Veitch; Ficus aspera f. parcellii (H.J.Veitch) J.E.Burrows; Ficus cannonii (H.J.Veitch) N.E.Br.; Ficus parcellii H.J.Veitch

= Ficus aspera =

Mosaic fig

Species of fig

Ficus aspera, commonly known as mosaic fig or clown fig, a plant native to Vanuatu in the South Pacific region. The plant first appeared in scientific literature in 1786, published by the German botanist Georg Forster, from a specimen collected from Tanna Island. The mosaic fig is used as an ornamental plant. The fruit are cauliflorous (fruit forming from their main stems or woody trunks rather than from new growth and shoots).
