= Ficus fresnoensis =

Conservation status
- Least Concern (IUCN 3.1)

Scientific classification
- Kingdom: Plantae
- Clade: Embryophytes
- Clade: Tracheophytes
- Clade: Angiosperms
- Clade: Eudicots
- Clade: Rosids
- Order: Rosales
- Family: Moraceae
- Genus: Ficus
- Species: F. fresnoensis

Binomial name
- Ficus fresnoensis Dugand

Species of flowering plant

Ficus fresnoensis, commonly known as higueron, is a species of flowering plant in the fig family, Moraceae. It is a tree endemic to Colombia, where it is known from Tolima Department in the northern Andes. It grows in lowland and montane tropical rain forest from 100 to 2,100 metres elevation. It is may be pollinated by wasps of the family Agaonidae and its fruit dispersed by birds.

The species was described by Armando Dugand in 1943.
