= Ficus archeri =

Conservation status
- Critically Endangered (IUCN 3.1)

Scientific classification
- Kingdom: Plantae
- Clade: Embryophytes
- Clade: Tracheophytes
- Clade: Angiosperms
- Clade: Eudicots
- Clade: Rosids
- Order: Rosales
- Family: Moraceae
- Genus: Ficus
- Species: F. archeri

Binomial name
- Ficus archeri Standl.

Species of flowering plant

Ficus soatensis, commonly known as uvillo, is a species of flowering plant in the fig family (Moraceae). It is a tree endemic to Colombia, where it is known a single subpopulations in Cauca Department in the northern Andes. It grows in montane tropical rain forest at 1,740 metres elevation. It may be pollinated by wasps of the family Agaonidae and its fruit is may be dispersed by birds.

The species was described by Paul Carpenter Standley in 1937.
