= Ficus populifolia =

Conservation status
- Least Concern (IUCN 3.1)

Scientific classification
- Kingdom: Plantae
- Clade: Tracheophytes
- Clade: Angiosperms
- Clade: Eudicots
- Clade: Rosids
- Order: Rosales
- Family: Moraceae
- Genus: Ficus
- Species: F. populifolia

Binomial name
- Ficus populifolia Vahl

Synonyms
- Ficus catalpifolia (Miq.) André; Ficus indiana Hochst. ex A.Rich.; Ficus intermedia Delile; Ficus populifolia var. major Warb.; Ficus populifolia var. taitensis Warb.; Ficus religiosa Forssk., nom. illeg. homonym. post.; Urostigma catalpifolium Miq.; Urostigma populifolium Miq.

Species of flowering plant

Ficus populifolia is a species of flowering plant in the fig family (Moraceae). It is a tree native to tropical Africa and the southwestern Arabian Peninsula. It ranges from Côte d'Ivoire in the west to Somalia in the east and south to Tanzania, and to Saudi Arabia and Yemen on the Arabian Peninsula, where it grows in lowland tropical forest.

The species was described by Martin Vahl in 1790.
