= Ficus recurvata =

Scientific classification
- Kingdom: Plantae
- Clade: Tracheophytes
- Clade: Angiosperms
- Clade: Eudicots
- Clade: Rosids
- Order: Rosales
- Family: Moraceae
- Genus: Ficus
- Species: F. recurvata

Binomial name
- Ficus recurvata De Wild.

Species of flowering plant

Ficus recurvata is an hemi-epiphyte species within the family Moraceae.

== Description ==
Ficus recurvata has been observed to grow either as a shrub or as a tree, when growing as a tree, it can reach an height of 35 m. The species often has buttressed roots that extends from the base of the tree. Its slash is brownish in color same as the color of stems are brownish in color. The leaves are spirally arranged while leaflets can reach a length of 28 cm and a width of 21 cm with a leaf blade that tends to be elliptical to oblong in shape. The surface of the leaves have a leathery texture while the leaf margin can be entire but sometimes toothed. Figs are pedunculate and are borne on leaf axils or beneath the leaves, peduncle is 1.5 to 3.5 cm long and about 2 mm thick. Figs are often large and green when young.

== Distribution and habitat ==
Occurs in parts of West Africa, in particular Ivory Coast and Nigeria and eastwards to the Central African countries of Cameroun, Angola, Central African Republic and the Democratic Republic of Congo. Found in savannahs and dense forest environments.
