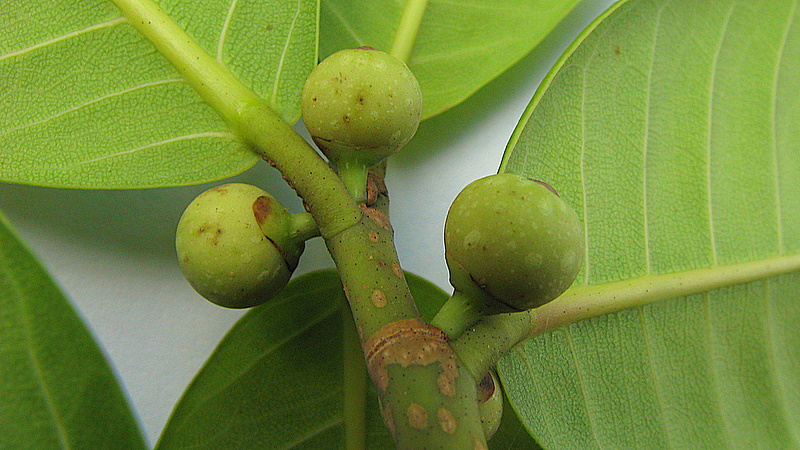

Conservation status
- Least Concern (IUCN 3.1)

Scientific classification
- Kingdom: Plantae
- Clade: Tracheophytes
- Clade: Angiosperms
- Clade: Eudicots
- Clade: Rosids
- Order: Rosales
- Family: Moraceae
- Genus: Ficus
- Species: F. bahiensis

Binomial name
- Ficus bahiensis C.C.Berg & Carauta

= Ficus bahiensis =

Species of tree

Ficus bahiensis is a species of tree. It is native to the Atlantic Forest of eastern and west-central Brazil. It grows in moist lowland rainforest, restinga (coastal rainforest on sand), and seasonally-dry deciduous forest. The IUCN listed the species as least concern.

The fruits are a food source for birds, mammals, and insects, and serve as an incubator for wasps in the genus Pegoscapus.
