= Ficus machetana =

Conservation status
- Least Concern (IUCN 3.1)

Scientific classification
- Kingdom: Plantae
- Clade: Embryophytes
- Clade: Tracheophytes
- Clade: Angiosperms
- Clade: Eudicots
- Clade: Rosids
- Order: Rosales
- Family: Moraceae
- Genus: Ficus
- Species: F. machetana

Binomial name
- Ficus machetana Dugand

Species of flowering plant

Ficus machetana, commonly known as higuerón, is a species of flowering plant in the fig family (Moraceae). It is a tree endemic to the northern Andes of Colombia, where it is known from a single subpopulation. It grows in montane tropical rain forest at 1850 metres elevation. It is pollinated by wasps of the family Agaonidae and its fruit is probably dispersed by birds.

The species was described by Armando Dugand in 1942.
