= Ficus sciaphila =

Conservation status
- Endangered (IUCN 3.1)

Scientific classification
- Kingdom: Plantae
- Clade: Embryophytes
- Clade: Tracheophytes
- Clade: Angiosperms
- Clade: Eudicots
- Clade: Rosids
- Order: Rosales
- Family: Moraceae
- Genus: Ficus
- Species: F. sciaphila

Binomial name
- Ficus sciaphila Corner

Species of flowering plant

Ficus sciaphila is a species of flowering plant, a tree in the family Moraceae. It is closely related to Ficus copiosa.

The species is regarded as endangered by the IUCN. This species is found in the Bismarck Archipelago.

Trees can grow up to 8 m tall.
