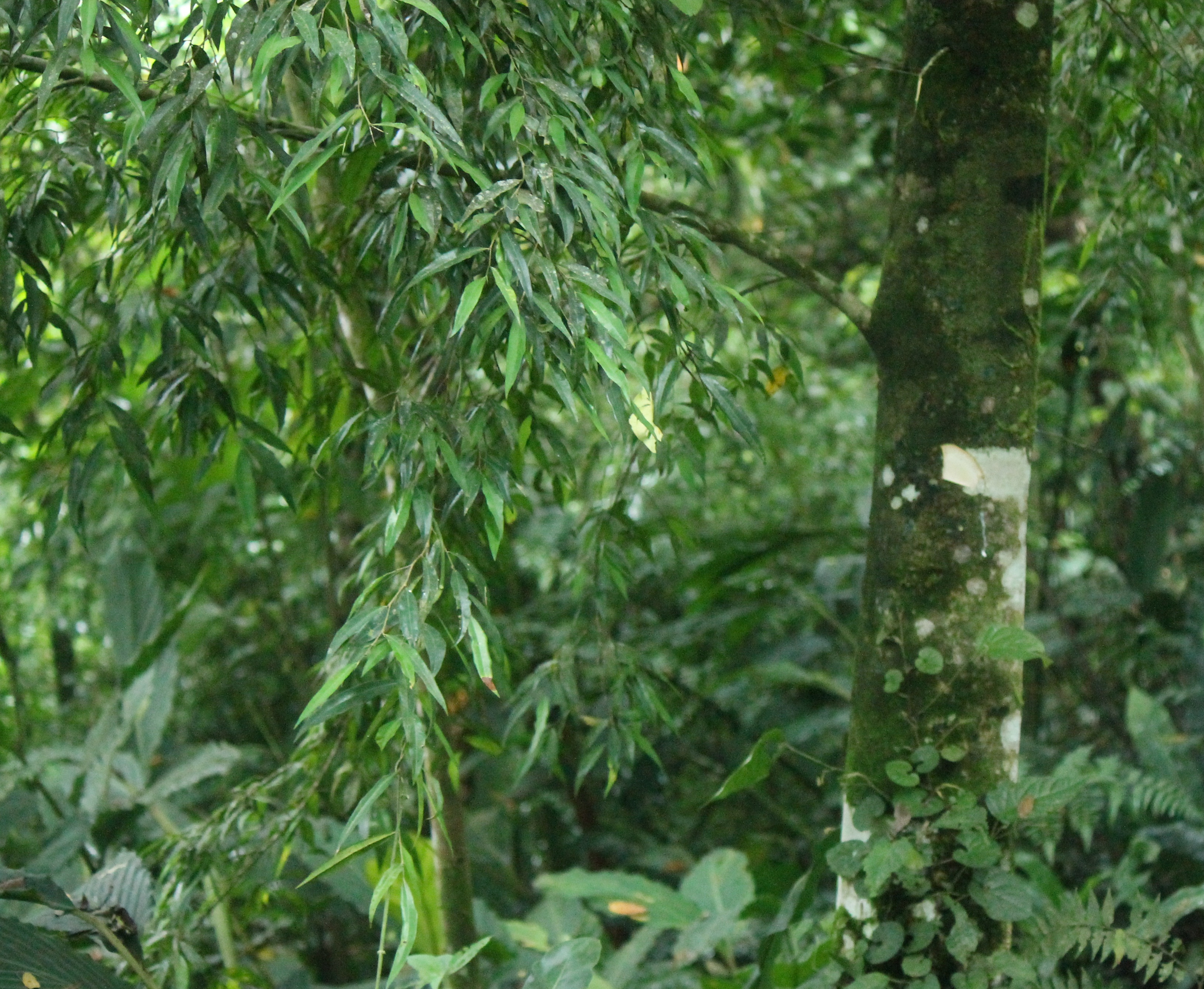
- In the wild, North Sulawesi

Conservation status
- Endangered (IUCN 3.1)

Scientific classification
- Kingdom: Plantae
- Clade: Embryophytes
- Clade: Tracheophytes
- Clade: Angiosperms
- Clade: Eudicots
- Clade: Rosids
- Order: Rosales
- Family: Moraceae
- Genus: Ficus
- Species: F. celebensis

Binomial name
- Ficus celebensis Corner

Synonyms
- Ficus irregularis Miq.

= Ficus celebensis =

Species of flowering plant

Ficus celebensis, the weeping fig or willow-leaved fig, is a species of flowering plant in the family Moraceae, endemic to the Minahasa Peninsula of Sulawesi. A tree reaching 25 m (82 ft), it is rare on its native island, but is occasionally planted as an ornamental elsewhere, such as Hong Kong, Singapore, and Australia.
