= Ficus chaponensis =

Conservation status
- Least Concern (IUCN 3.1)

Scientific classification
- Kingdom: Plantae
- Clade: Tracheophytes
- Clade: Angiosperms
- Clade: Eudicots
- Clade: Rosids
- Order: Rosales
- Family: Moraceae
- Genus: Ficus
- Species: F. chaponensis

Binomial name
- Ficus chaponensis Dugand

Species of flowering plant

Ficus chaponensis is a species of flowering plant in the fig family (Moraceae). It is a tree endemic to Colombia, where it is known from a single subpopulation in Boyaca Department in the northern Andes. It grows in montane tropical rain forest at 1,020 metres elevation. It is likely pollinated by wasps of the family Agaonidae and its fruit is dispersed by birds.

The species was described by Armando Dugand in 1942.
