= Ficus aurata =

- Specimen from Brunei

Scientific classification
- Kingdom: Plantae
- Clade: Tracheophytes
- Clade: Angiosperms
- Clade: Eudicots
- Clade: Rosids
- Order: Rosales
- Family: Moraceae
- Genus: Ficus
- Species: F. aurata

Binomial name
- Ficus aurata (Miq.) Miq.

Synonyms
- Covellia aurata Miq.; Ficus aurata var. densiserra (Miq.) Miq.; Ficus aurata var. longipilosa Corner; Ficus aurata var. palawanensis Corner; Ficus aurata var. pedunculata Corner; Ficus auriculifera Merr.; Ficus aurita var. auriculifera (Merr.) Corner; Ficus aurita var. celebica (Reinw. ex Blume) Corner; Ficus celebica Reinw. ex Blume; Ficus chrysocarpa var. undulata H.J.P.Winkl.; Ficus densiserra Miq.

Species of plant

Ficus aurata is a species of flowering plant that belongs to Moraceae. It is a large shrub or small tree native to Vietnam, Peninsular Malaysia, Sumatra, Borneo, and the Philippines.
