= Ficus popayanensis =

Conservation status
- Least Concern (IUCN 3.1)

Scientific classification
- Kingdom: Plantae
- Clade: Embryophytes
- Clade: Tracheophytes
- Clade: Angiosperms
- Clade: Eudicots
- Clade: Rosids
- Order: Rosales
- Family: Moraceae
- Genus: Ficus
- Species: F. popayanensis

Binomial name
- Ficus popayanensis Standl.

Species of flowering plant

Ficus popayanensis, commonly known as cauchillo, is a species of flowering plant in the fig family (Moraceae). It is a tree endemic to Colombia, where it is known from eleven subpopulations in the northern Andes. It grows in montane tropical rain forest from above 1,000 up to 2,800 metres elevation. It is probably pollinated by insects and its fruit is probably dispersed by vertebrates.

The species was described by Paul Carpenter Standley in 1937.
