= Ficus cuatrecasasiana =

Conservation status
- Least Concern (IUCN 3.1)

Scientific classification
- Kingdom: Plantae
- Clade: Tracheophytes
- Clade: Angiosperms
- Clade: Eudicots
- Clade: Rosids
- Order: Rosales
- Family: Moraceae
- Genus: Ficus
- Species: F. cuatrecasasiana

Binomial name
- Ficus cuatrecasasiana Dugand

Synonyms
- Ficus aguaraguensis Vázq.Avila; Ficus garcia-barrigae var. ovoidea Dugand; Ficus sibundoya Dugand

Species of flowering plant

Ficus cuatrecasasiana is a species of flowering plant in the family Moraceae. It is a hemiepiphytic tree native to Costa Rica, Panama, Colombia, Venezuela, Ecuador, Peru, and Bolivia, where it grows in tropical lowland and montane rain forests in the Andes and the Pacific and Caribbean lowlands.

The species was first described by Armando Dugand in 1942.
