= Ficus sinuata =

Conservation status
- Least Concern (IUCN 3.1)

Scientific classification
- Kingdom: Plantae
- Clade: Tracheophytes
- Clade: Angiosperms
- Clade: Eudicots
- Clade: Rosids
- Order: Rosales
- Family: Moraceae
- Genus: Ficus
- Species: F. sinuata

Binomial name
- Ficus sinuata Thunb.

Synonyms
- Ficus cuspidata var. sinuata (Thunb.) King; Ficus angulidens Miq.; Ficus marginalis Buch.-Ham. ex Miq.; Ficus obtusidens Miq.; Ficus quercifolia Blume; Ficus radicans var. angulosa Miq.; Ficus raridens Miq.; Ficus rostrata Lam.; Ficus sinuata var. oblonga Corner

Species of flowering plant

Ficus sinuata is a species of plant from the family Moraceae. It is an evergreen shrub or small tree native to India and Southeast Asia.

== Description ==
Ficus sinuata can grow up to 6 m (20 ft) tall. It often begins as an epilithic lithophyte before its roots extend to the ground.

Similar to other figs, its fruits are syconia in which its flowers are enclosed. These fruits are round or elliptical, 3 to 8 mm (0.12 to 0.31 in) in diameter, and are most often produced in clusters underneath the plant's leaves though they can occasionally appear alone or in pairs. They turn red or orange when mature.

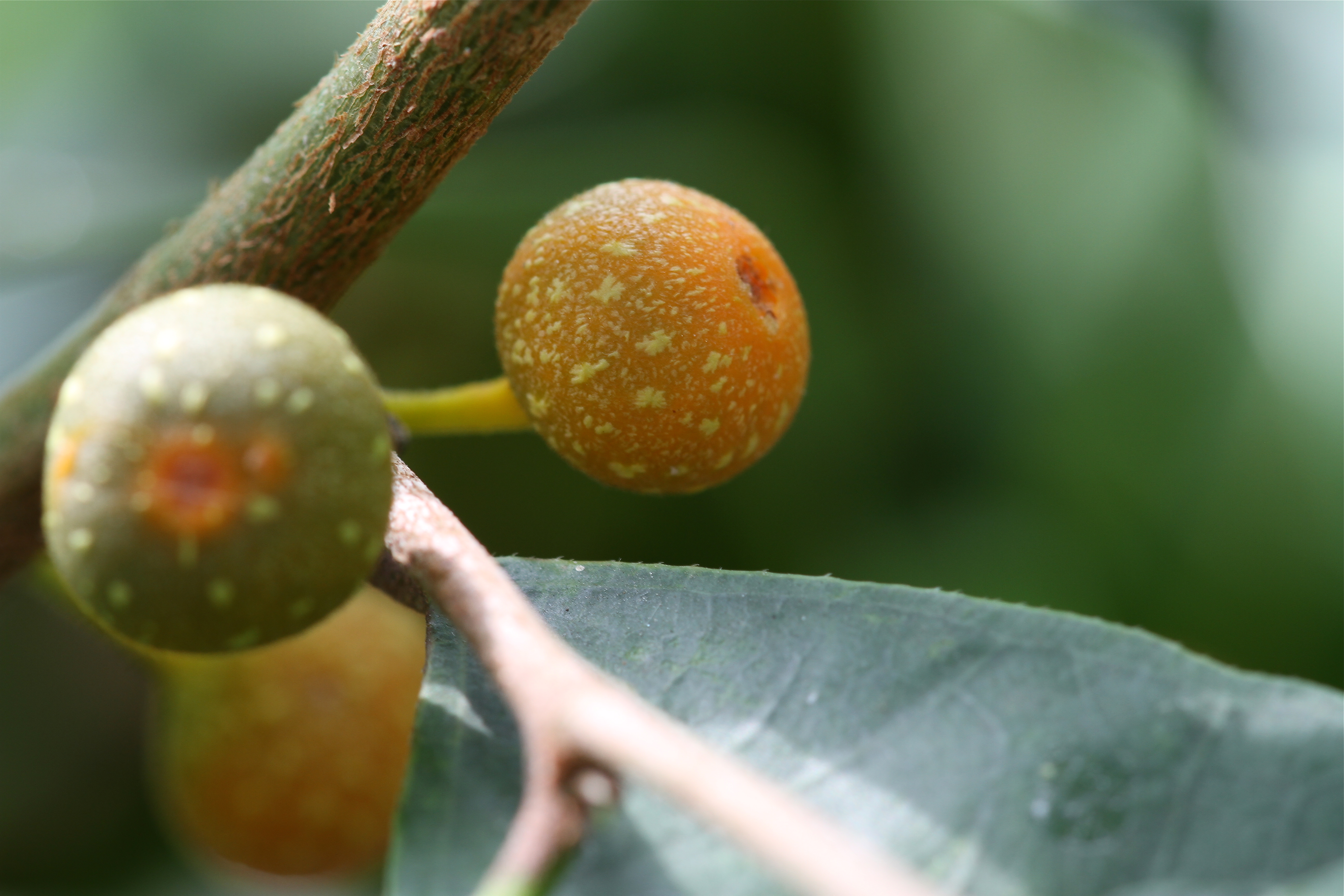
Fruit

== Distribution and habitat ==
Ficus sinuata grows in tropical forests below 2,400 m (7,900 ft) above sea level.

== Conservation ==
While the species isn't at risk overall, it has been noted to be at risk in Singapore specifically.
