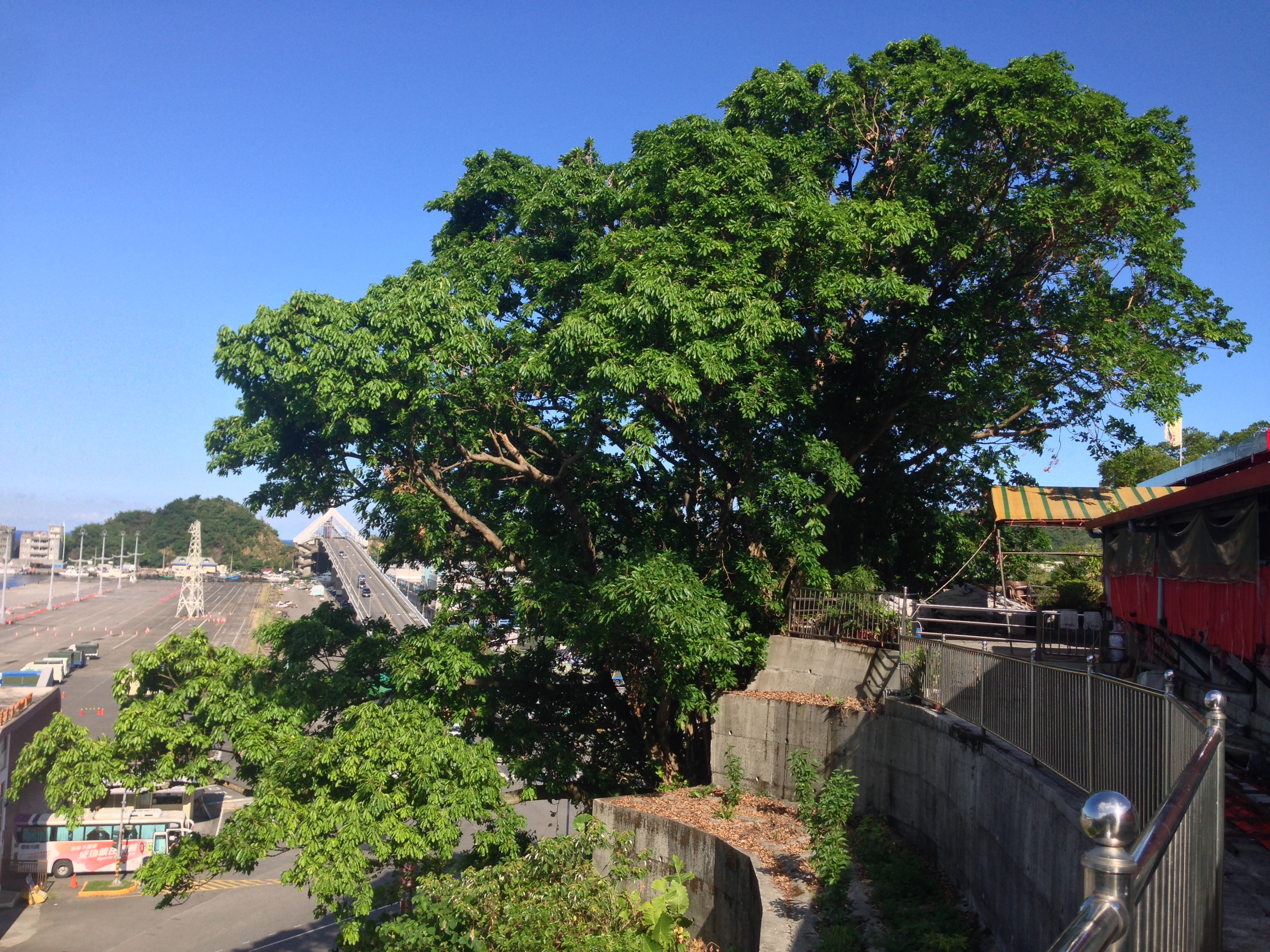

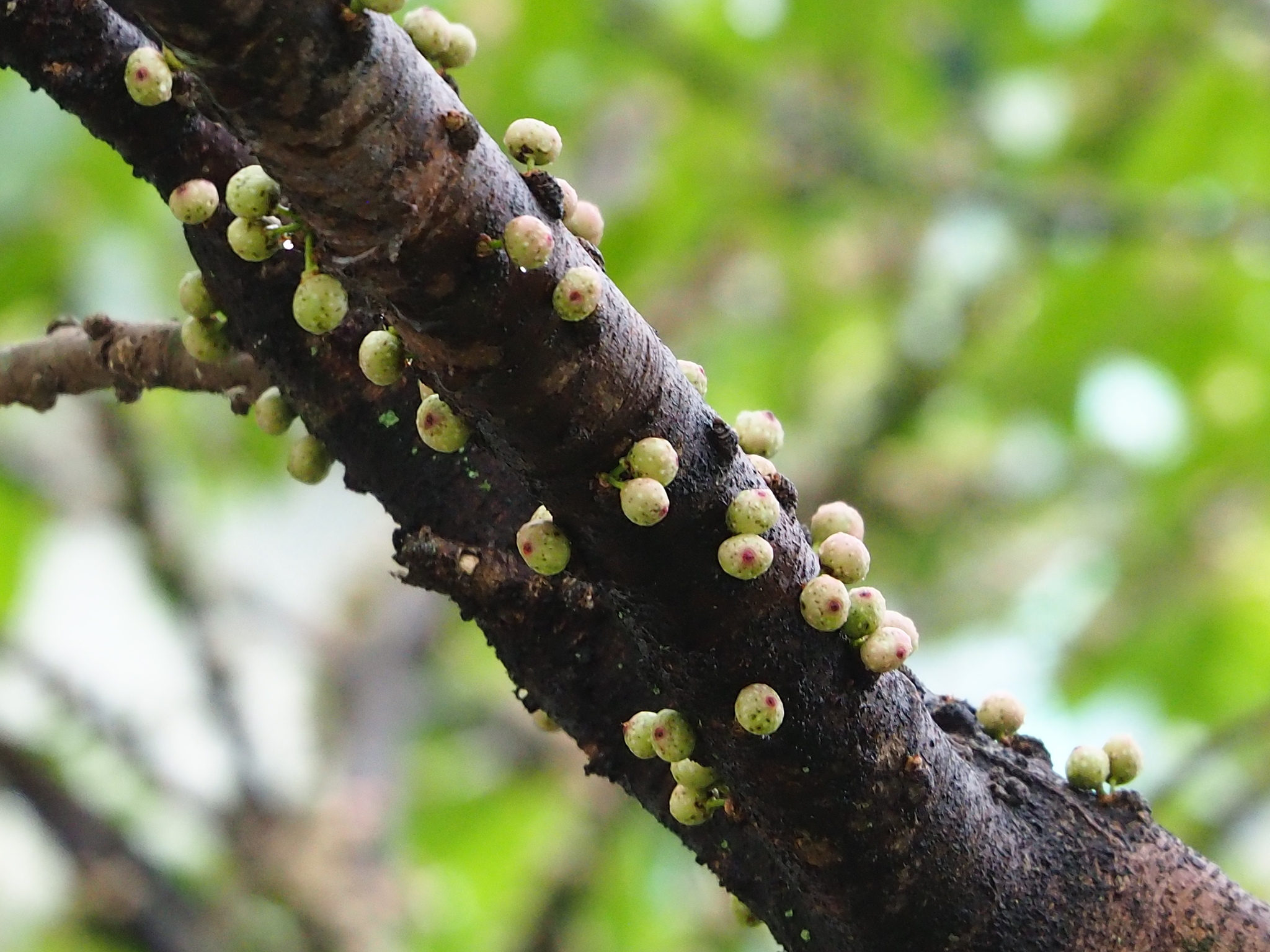

Conservation status
- Least Concern (IUCN 3.1)

Scientific classification
- Kingdom: Plantae
- Clade: Tracheophytes
- Clade: Angiosperms
- Clade: Eudicots
- Clade: Rosids
- Order: Rosales
- Family: Moraceae
- Genus: Ficus
- Species: F. caulocarpa

Binomial name
- Ficus caulocarpa (Miq.) Miq.

Varieties
- Ficus caulocarpa var. caulocarpa; Ficus caulocarpa var. dasycarpa Corner

Synonyms
- Species: Ficus infectoria var. caulocarpa (Miq.) King; Ficus virens var. caulocarpa (Miq.) M.R.Almeida; Urostigma caulocarpum Miq.; var. caulocarpa: Ficus stipulosa (Miq.) Miq.; Ficus weinlandii K.Schum.; Urostigma stipulosum Miq.

= Ficus caulocarpa =

Species of plant

Ficus caulocarpa is a flowering plant in the genus Ficus in the family Moraceae. It is native to southeastern Asia, from India and Sri Lanka easy to Taiwan and the Philippines, and also New Guinea. It is an often shrubby, multistemmed tree growing to 20 m tall. The leaves, of which three complete sets are produced each year (triannually deciduous), are entire and glabrous, and up to 22 cm long by 8.5 cm broad.
