= Ficus lehmannii =

Conservation status
- Least Concern (IUCN 3.1)

Scientific classification
- Kingdom: Plantae
- Clade: Embryophytes
- Clade: Tracheophytes
- Clade: Angiosperms
- Clade: Eudicots
- Clade: Rosids
- Order: Rosales
- Family: Moraceae
- Genus: Ficus
- Species: F. lehmannii

Binomial name
- Ficus lehmannii Standl.

Species of flowering plant

Ficus lehmannii is a species of flowering plant in the fig family (Moraceae). It is a tree endemic to the northern Andes of Colombia. It grows in montane tropical rain forest from 1,200 to 2,700 metres elevation. It is pollinated by wasps of the family Agaonidae and its fruit is probably dispersed by birds.

The species was described by Paul Carpenter Standley in 1929.
