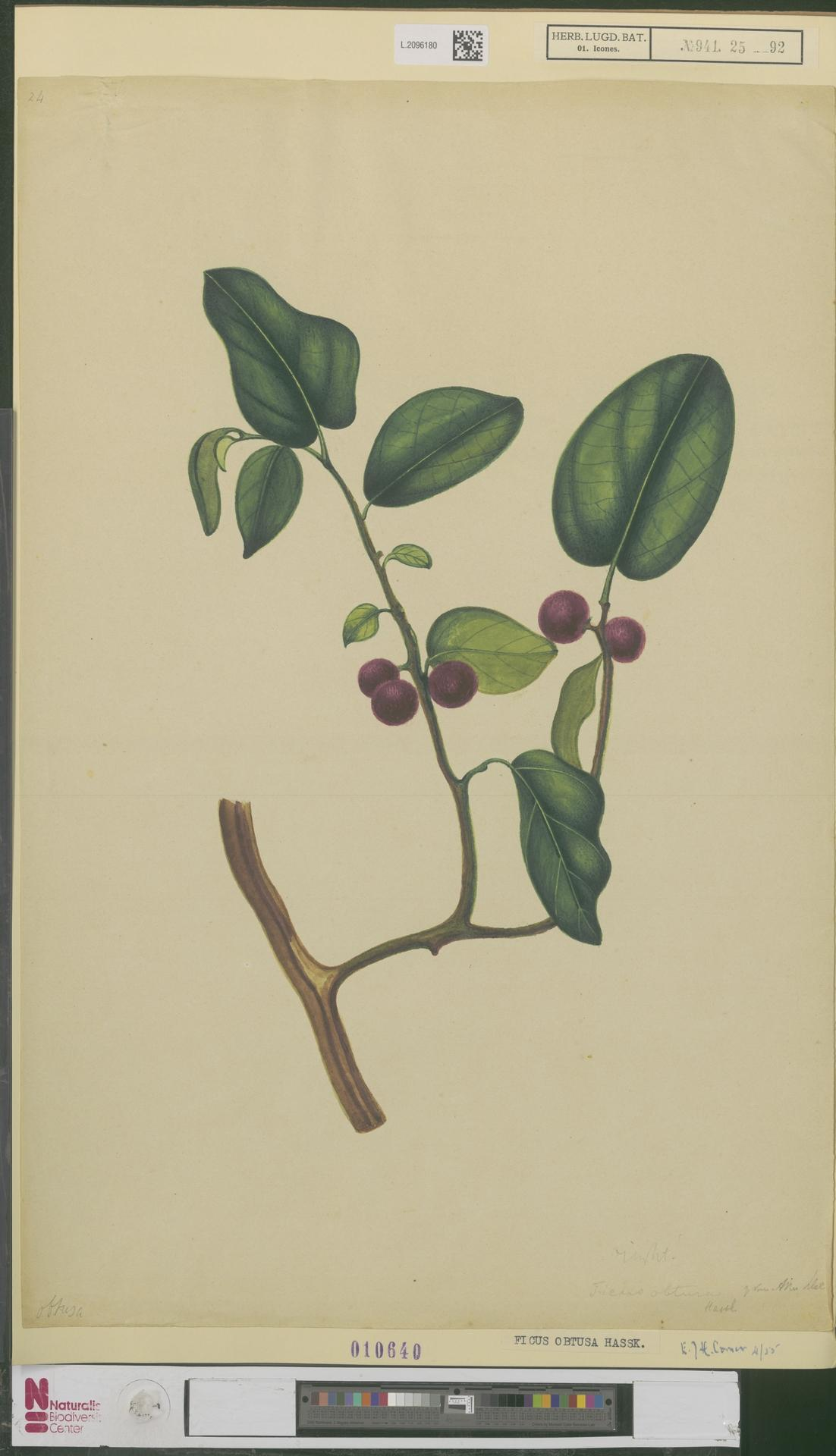

Conservation status
- Least Concern (IUCN 3.1)

Scientific classification
- Kingdom: Plantae
- Clade: Tracheophytes
- Clade: Angiosperms
- Clade: Eudicots
- Clade: Rosids
- Order: Rosales
- Family: Moraceae
- Genus: Ficus
- Subgenus: F. subg. Synoecia
- Species: F. trichocarpa

Binomial name
- Ficus trichocarpa Blume

Synonyms
- List: Ficus ahernii Merr.; Ficus aspera var. volubilis Blanco; Ficus filiformis Blume; Ficus nodulosa Zipp. ex Miq.; Ficus obtusa Hassk.; Ficus obtusa var. gedehensis Koord. & Valeton; Ficus obtusa var. genuina Koord. & Valeton, not validly publ.; Ficus obtusa var. piperifolia (Miq.) Koord. & Valeton; Ficus phaeopoda (Miq.) Miq.; Ficus piperifolia (Miq.) Miq.; Ficus piperifolia var. borneensis (Miq.) Miq.; Ficus platycaula Miq.; Ficus pyrrhopoda Miq.; Ficus tawaensis Merr.; Ficus trichopoda var. borneensis (Miq.) Corner; Ficus trichocarpa var. obtusa (Hasskarl) Corner; Ficus trichocarpa var. piperifolia (Miq.) Corner; Pogonotrophe borneensis Miq.; Pogonotrophe javana Miq.; Pogonotrophe phaeopoda Miq.; Pogonotrophe piperifolia Miq.; Pogonotrophe pyrrhopoda Miq.; Urostigma trichocarpum (Blume) Miq.

= Ficus trichocarpa =

Species of climbing fig

Ficus trichocarpa is a climbing fig species, in the family Moraceae, which can be found in Bangladesh, Indo-China and Malesia. In Vietnam it may be called sung tà.

No subspecies are listed in the Catalogue of Life. The form previously named F. trichocarpa f. glabrescens Engl. is a synonym of Ficus racemosa L.
