= Ficus bhotanica =

Scientific classification
- Kingdom: Plantae
- Clade: Tracheophytes
- Clade: Angiosperms
- Clade: Eudicots
- Clade: Rosids
- Order: Rosales
- Family: Moraceae
- Genus: Ficus
- Species: F. bhotanica

Binomial name
- Ficus bhotanica King

Synonyms
- Ficus laceratifolia H.Lév. & Vaniot; Ficus rhomboidalis H.Lév. & Vaniot; Ficus gasparriniana var. laceratifolia (H.Lév. & Vaniot) Corner

Species of flowering plant

Ficus bhotanica, commonly known as Christmas fig or ling ye guan mao rong (Chinese: 菱叶冠毛榕), is a species of flowering plant in the family Moraceae. It is native to Bhutan, China, India, and Myanmar.

== Taxonomy and history ==
Ficus bhotanica was described by George King in 1888. The same species would be described from a different type specimen as Ficus laceratifolia by Augustin Abel Hector Léveillé and Eugène Vaniot in 1907, and later recharacterised as a variety of Ficus gasparriniana, F. gasparriniana var. laceratifolia, by Edred John Henry Corner in 1960.

== Distribution and habitat ==
Ficus bhotanica is native to Bhutan, China (Guangxi, Guizhou, Sichuan, and Yunnan), India (Arunachal Pradesh and Assam), and Myanmar. In China, it grows in forests at 600–1,300 m (2,000–4,300 ft) above sea level.

== Description ==
Ficus bhotanica is an evergreen tree or shrub growing up to 6 ft (1.8 m) tall, sometimes producing aerial roots. The dark green leaves are obovate and measure approximately 7–15 cm (2.8–5.9 in) by 2.5–5 cm (0.98–1.97 in) with one to four irregular teeth near the tip. The fruits are red achenes measuring 2.5–3.5 mm (0.098–0.138 in) in diameter.
