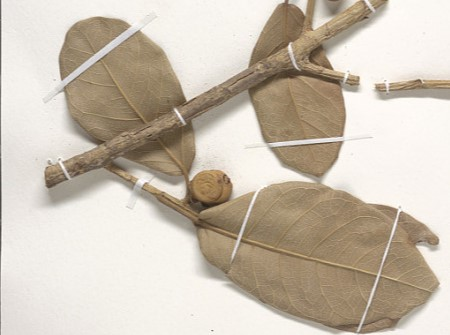

Conservation status
- Least Concern (IUCN 3.1)

Scientific classification
- Kingdom: Plantae
- Clade: Tracheophytes
- Clade: Angiosperms
- Clade: Eudicots
- Clade: Rosids
- Order: Rosales
- Family: Moraceae
- Genus: Ficus
- Species: F. crassinervia

Binomial name
- Ficus crassinervia Desf. ex Willd.

Synonyms
- Ficus belizensis Lundell; Ficus berteroi Warb.; Ficus eggersii Warb.; Ficus ekmanii Rossberg; Ficus lacandonensis Lundell; Ficus mamillifera Warb.; Ficus mamillifera var. hirsuta Fawc. & Rendle; Ficus ovalis (Liebm.) Miq.; Ficus stahlii Warb.; Urostigma crassinervium (Desf. ex Willd.) Miq.; Urostigma ovale Liebm.

= Ficus crassinervia =

Species of flowering plant

Ficus crassinervia is a species of flowering plant in the fig family (Moraceae). It is a tree native to Mexico, Central America, and the Caribbean. It grows in lowland tropical moist forests.
