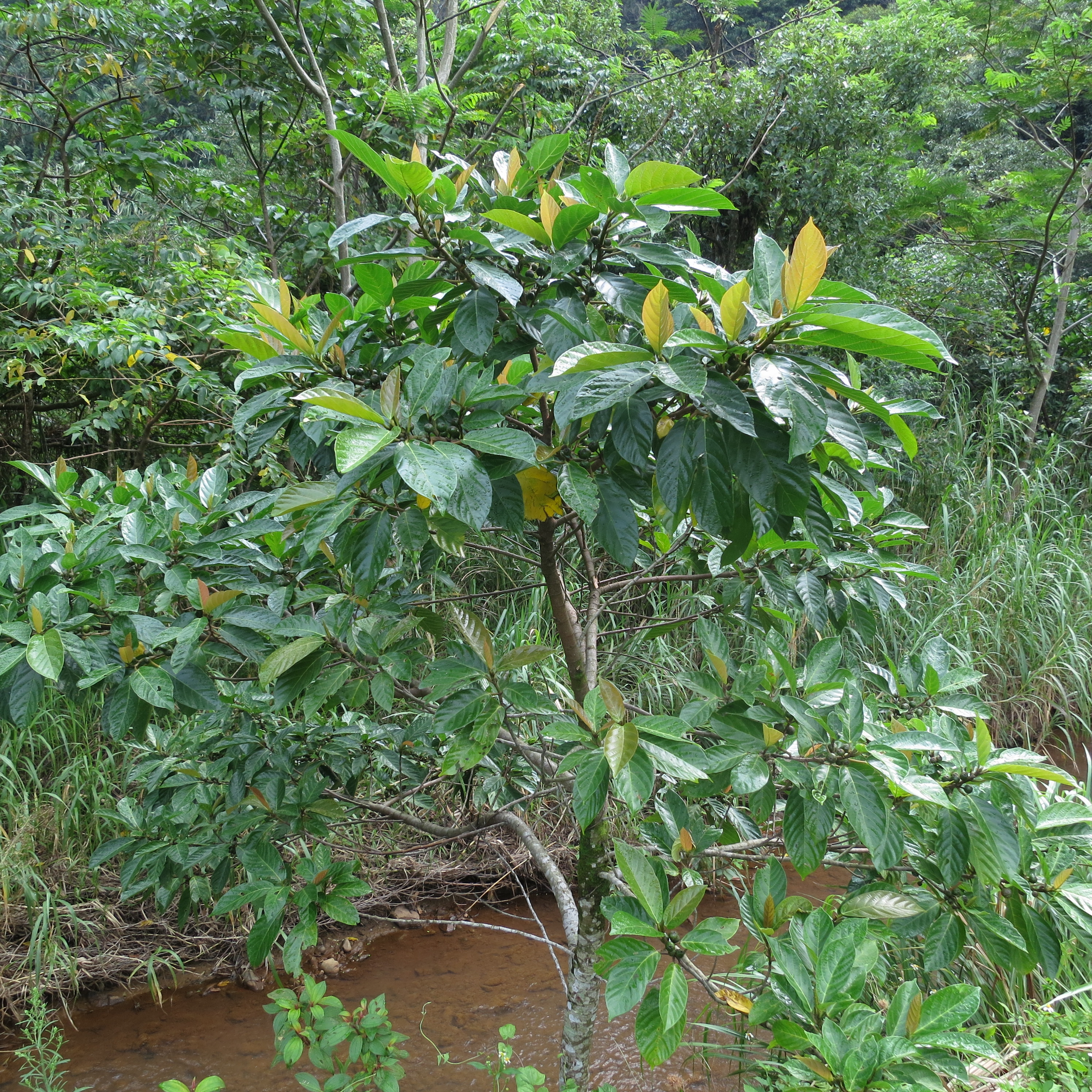
- In Taiwan

Conservation status
- Least Concern (IUCN 3.1)

Scientific classification
- Kingdom: Plantae
- Clade: Tracheophytes
- Clade: Angiosperms
- Clade: Eudicots
- Clade: Rosids
- Order: Rosales
- Family: Moraceae
- Genus: Ficus
- Subgenus: F. subg. Sycomorus
- Species: F. benguetensis

Binomial name
- Ficus benguetensis Merr.

Synonyms
- Synonymy: Ficus benguetensis f. leytensis (Elmer) Sata; Ficus benguetensis var. leytensis Elmer; Ficus benguetensis f. negrosensis (Elmer) Sata; Ficus benguetensis var. negrosensis Elmer; Ficus benguetensis f. urdanetensis (Elmer) Sata; Ficus cuernosensis Elmer; Ficus fistulosa f. benguetensis (Merr.) T.S.Liu & J.C.Liao; Ficus harlandii var. grandifolia Sata; Ficus harlandii var. kotoensis (Hayata) Sata; Ficus maquilingensis Elmer; Ficus miyagii Koidz.; Ficus ochobiensis Hayata; Ficus peabodyi Elmer; Ficus urdanetensis Elmer; Ficus wenzelii Merr.

= Ficus benguetensis =

Species of fig

Ficus benguetensis (called 豬母乳 in Taiwan) is a shrub or tree of the family Moraceae living at low elevations in the Ryukyu Islands, Taiwan, and in the Philippines but not in Palawan. It lives as an understorey tree in humid forest environment and along streams and rivers.

== Taxonomy ==
Ficus benguetensis was described by the American botanist Elmer Drew Merrill in 1905. Within the genus, Ficus benguetensis belongs to the subgenus Sycomorus section Sycocarpus subsection Sycocarpus.

== Description ==
Tree or shrub up to 15 meters tall. New leaves are characteristically reddish or orange before reaching maturation. Leaves are symmetric, elliptic to oblong. Figs grow often from stipules on growing from the trunk of male trees but grow by pairs on apical branches on female trees. Figs are subglobose to ellipsoid or ovoid, the apex is flat or concave. The figs are green but the inside of the figs is pink to reddish pink. At maturity, the figs became yellowish green.

== Habitat ==
Ficus benguetensis grows in humid tropical and subtropical moist lowland and montane forests and thickets, often along streams and small rivers, from 60 to 1,800 metres elevation.

== Ecology ==
Ficus benguetensis is pollinated by fig wasps from the genus Ceratosolen and dispersed by birds and fruit bats. In a single area south of Taipei, up to 13 different species of ants have been found on Ficus benguetensis figs. Moreover, this is the first species of Ficus described to have extrafloral nectaries directly on the figs. Two species of parasitic nonpollinating fig wasps have been recently described from Ficus benguetensis: Philotrypesis taida and Sycorycteridea taipeiensis.
