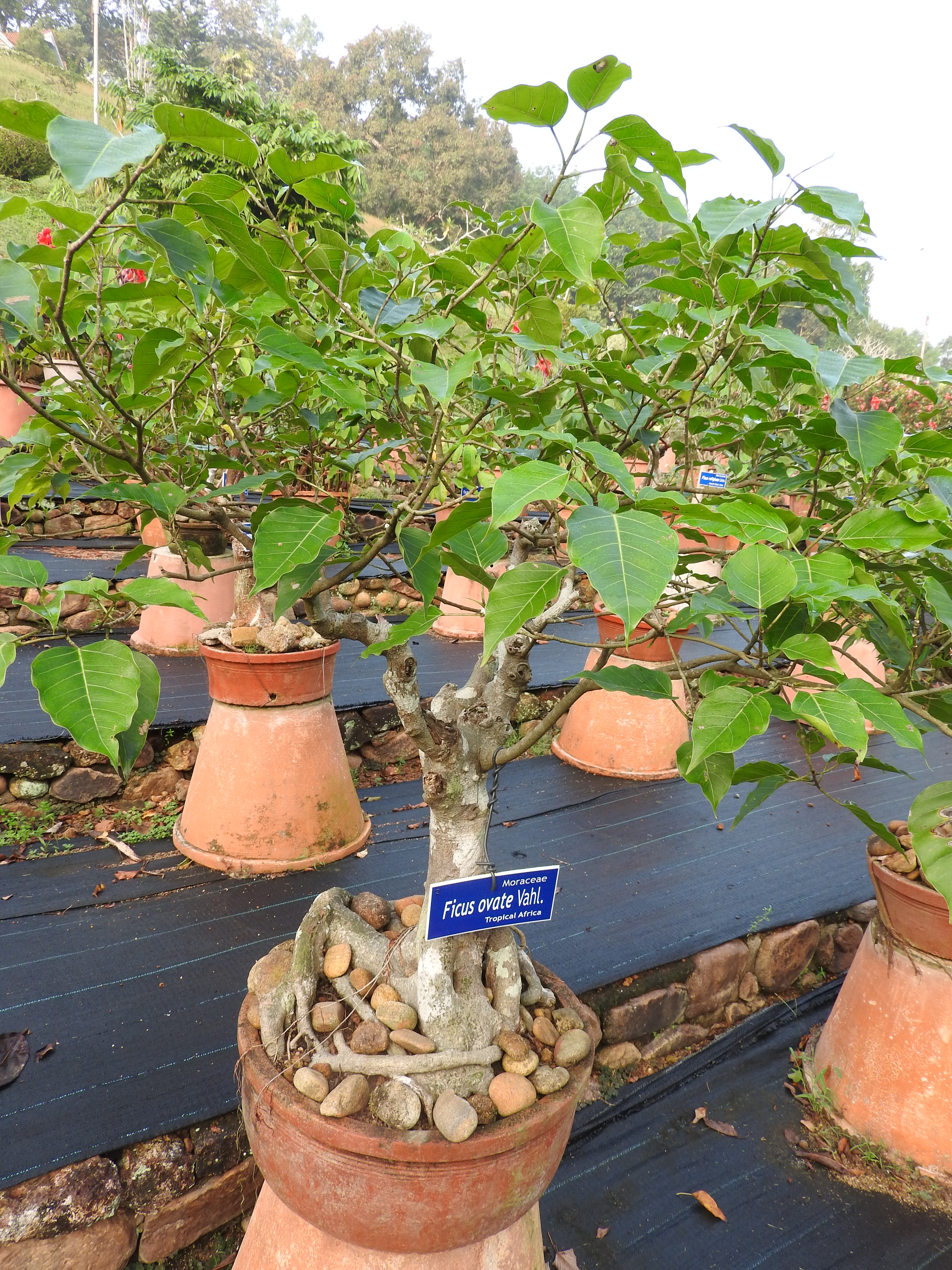

Scientific classification
- Kingdom: Plantae
- Clade: Embryophytes
- Clade: Tracheophytes
- Clade: Spermatophytes
- Clade: Angiosperms
- Clade: Eudicots
- Clade: Rosids
- Order: Rosales
- Family: Moraceae
- Genus: Ficus
- Species: F. laurifolia

Binomial name
- Ficus laurifolia Lam.

= Ficus laurifolia =

Species of flowering plant

Ficus laurifolia is an hemi-epiphytic species that sometimes grows as a shrub or liana or as a tree, the species is within the family Moraceae.

== Description ==
The species grows as a shrub, a liana or as a medium to large sized tree that can reach a height of about 25 m (82 ft), the bark is grey while the slash is reddish to pale brown exuding a creamy white latex; Stem is brownish in color with minute hairs. Its leaves are arranged spirally, with petiole that sometimes reach 9 cm (3.5 in) long, stipules are present and are usually glabrous and up to 5 cm (2.0 in) in length. The leaf outline is broadly elliptic to ovate, with leaflets that can reach 30 cm (12 in) long and 20 cm (7.9 in) wide with margins that are entire, the base of leaves tends to be cordate to rounded and the apex is acuminate. Figs are usually borne on leafs axils or beneath the leaves, the figs are sessile or shortly pedunculate with receptacles, they tend to be oblong to globular in shape, greenish with white spots, peduncles are 3–5 mm (0.12–0.20 in) long; basal bracts are commonly paired.

== Distribution and habitat ==
Ficus laurifolia occurs in Tropical Africa, from Guinea-Bissau eastwards to Sudan and southwards to Mozambique. It is found in savannah woodlands, gallery forests and forest edges.

== Uses ==
A stem bark and leaf decoction is used in the treatment of gastro-intestinal infections. The species is also planted as a shade tree.
