= Ficus membranacea =

Conservation status
- Least Concern (IUCN 3.1)

Scientific classification
- Kingdom: Plantae
- Clade: Tracheophytes
- Clade: Angiosperms
- Clade: Eudicots
- Clade: Rosids
- Order: Rosales
- Family: Moraceae
- Genus: Ficus
- Species: F. membranacea

Binomial name
- Ficus membranacea C.Wright

Synonyms
- Ficus harrisii Warb.; Ficus jonesii Standl.; Ficus meizonochlamys Rossberg

Species of flowering plant

Ficus membranacea is a species of flowering plant in the family Moraceae, commonly known as amate. It is a tree native to the tropical Americas, including northern, central, and southwestern Mexico, Cuba, Jamaica, Colombia, Ecuador, and Peru. It is a hemiepiphytic tree which grows 10–30 meters tall. It grows in tropical deciduous forests, gallery forests, and secondary vegetation from 25 to 2,000 meters elevation.
