= Ficus dicranostyla =

Conservation status
- Least Concern (IUCN 3.1)

Scientific classification
- Kingdom: Plantae
- Clade: Tracheophytes
- Clade: Angiosperms
- Clade: Eudicots
- Clade: Rosids
- Order: Rosales
- Family: Moraceae
- Genus: Ficus
- Species: F. dicranostyla

Binomial name
- Ficus dicranostyla Mildbr.

Synonyms
- List: Ficus dicranostyla var. nitida Hutch.; Ficus lynesii Lebrun

Species of flowering plant

Ficus dicranostyla is a species of flowering plant in the family Moraceae. It is a shrub or tree that is native to Benin, Burkina Faso, Cameroon, the Central African Republic, Chad, the Democratic Republic of the Congo, Ethiopia, Gabon, Ghana, Guinea, Guinea-Bissau, Ivory Coast, Mali, Senegal, Sierra Leone, South Sudan, Sudan, Togo, Uganda, and Zambia.

It is one of the two species of Ficus within the section Oreosycea of Ficus subgenus Pharmacosycea.

It was named by Johannes Mildbraed.

== Description ==
The species grows up to 8 m tall but occasionally taller, sometimes reaching 35 m in height, it has a spreading cown, a greyish to brownish bark that is often rough and fissured; the slash is pale brown exuding latex. The stems are usually brownish in color, are pubescent when young but when matured they are commonly free of hair. The leaves are arranged spirally and tend to be distichous with a surface that borders on either papery or leathery, stipules are present and are caducous, up to 1.5 cm long. The leaf blade is broadly ovate to elliptical with a base that is cordate to rounded and an apex that is acuminate; leaves can grow up to 20 cm long and 9 cm wide. Figs are borne in pairs or solitary in leaf axils and are pedunculate with peduncles that can reach 1 cm long and with 3 basal bracts. The figs are yellowish green when young to yellowish orange when mature, they are globular to obovoid in shape.

== Distribution and habitat ==
Commonly occurs in West, East and Central Africa, from Senegal to Ethiopia and southwards to Zambia. Found in rocky soils in savannahs and gallery or deciduous forests.
