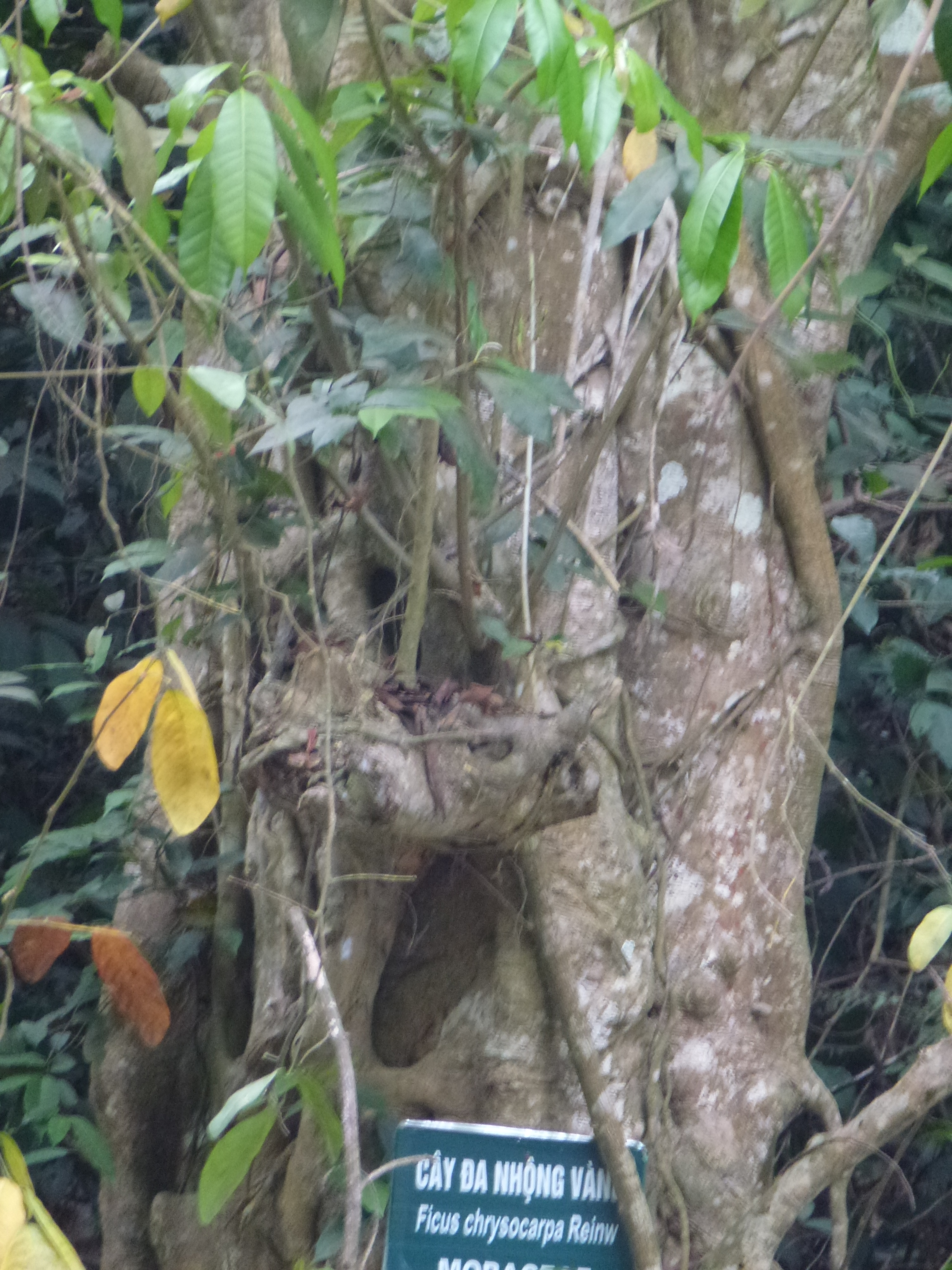
- F. fulva specimen in Vietnam, identified with its synonym F. chrysocarpa

Conservation status
- Least Concern (IUCN 3.1)

Scientific classification
- Kingdom: Plantae
- Clade: Tracheophytes
- Clade: Angiosperms
- Clade: Eudicots
- Clade: Rosids
- Order: Rosales
- Family: Moraceae
- Tribe: Ficeae
- Genus: Ficus
- Subgenus: F. subg. Ficus
- Species: F. fulva

Binomial name
- Ficus fulva Reinw. ex Blume

Synonyms
- List: Ficus apiculata Miq.; Ficus chlorocarpa Miq.; Ficus chrysocarpa Reinw. ex Bl.; Ficus chrysocarpa var. flavidula (Miq.) Miq.; Ficus discolor Miq.; Ficus flavidula (Miq.) Miq.; Ficus fulva var. chrysocarpa (Reinw. ex Blume) Koord.; Ficus fulva var. minor King; Ficus fulva var. orbicularis Miq.; Ficus fulva var. rubinervis Hassk.; Ficus fulva var. timorensis Corner; Ficus fulva var. typica M.F.Barrett, not validly publ.; Ficus fulva f. typica King, not validly publ.; Ficus patens Ridl.; Ficus reinwardtii Link & Otto; Ficus suborbicularis Miq.; Pogonotrophe flavidula Miq.

= Ficus fulva =

Species of fig tree from Asia

Ficus fulva is a fig species in the family Moraceae. The native range of this species is from eastern India and Bangladesh to Indo-China and throughout Malesia. The species can be found in Vietnam, where it may be called ngái vàng, ngái lông, or vả. Ficus fulva is dioecious, with male and female flowers produced on separate individuals.

The species was described by Carl Ludwig Blume in 1825. No subspecies are recorded.
