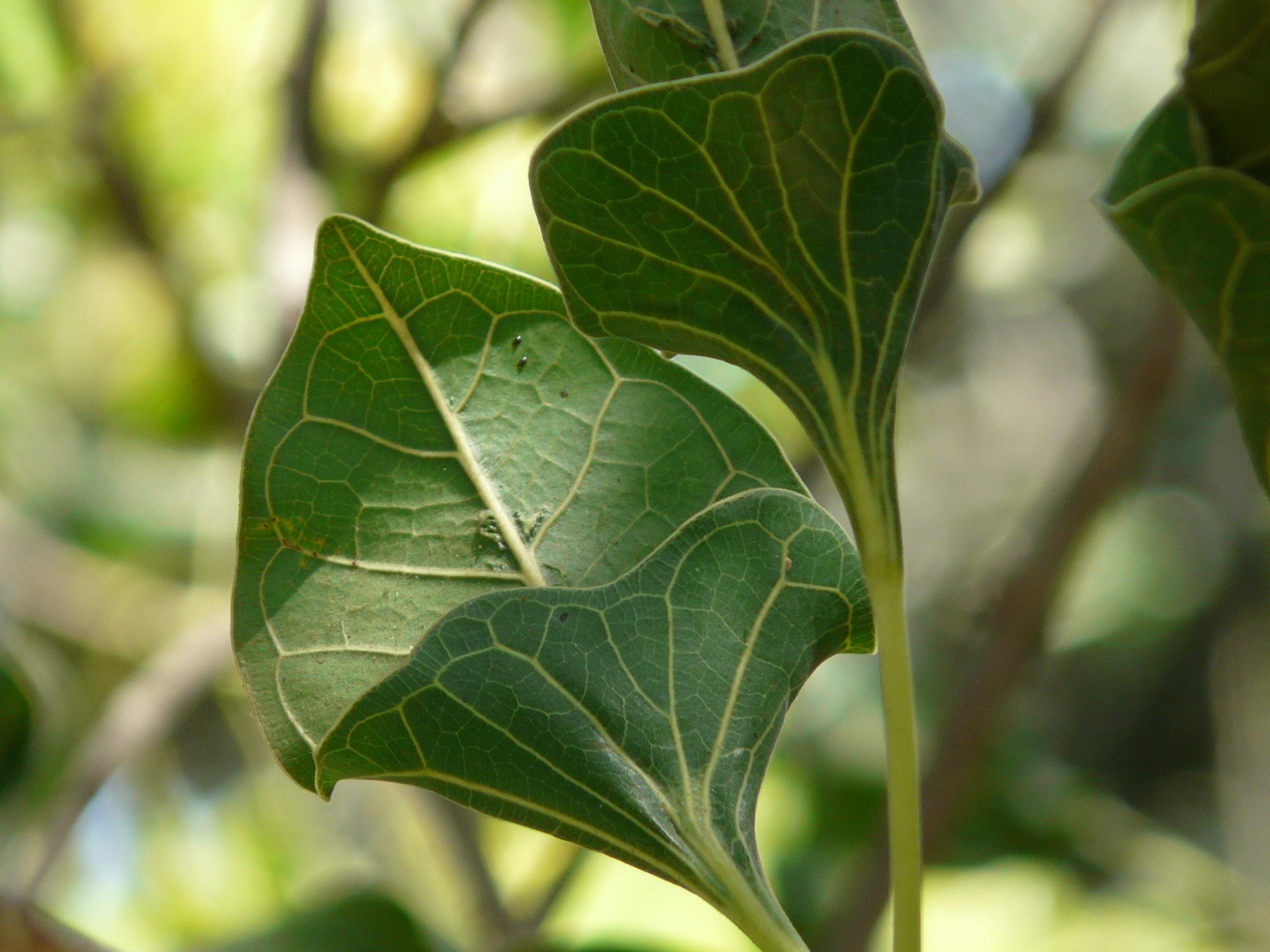
- Leaves of Ficus krishnae

Scientific classification
- Kingdom: Plantae
- Clade: Embryophytes
- Clade: Tracheophytes
- Clade: Angiosperms
- Clade: Eudicots
- Clade: Rosids
- Order: Rosales
- Family: Moraceae
- Genus: Ficus
- Species: F. krishnae

Binomial name
- Ficus krishnae C.DC., Bot. Mag. 132: t. 8092 (1906).

= Ficus krishnae =

Species of fig tree

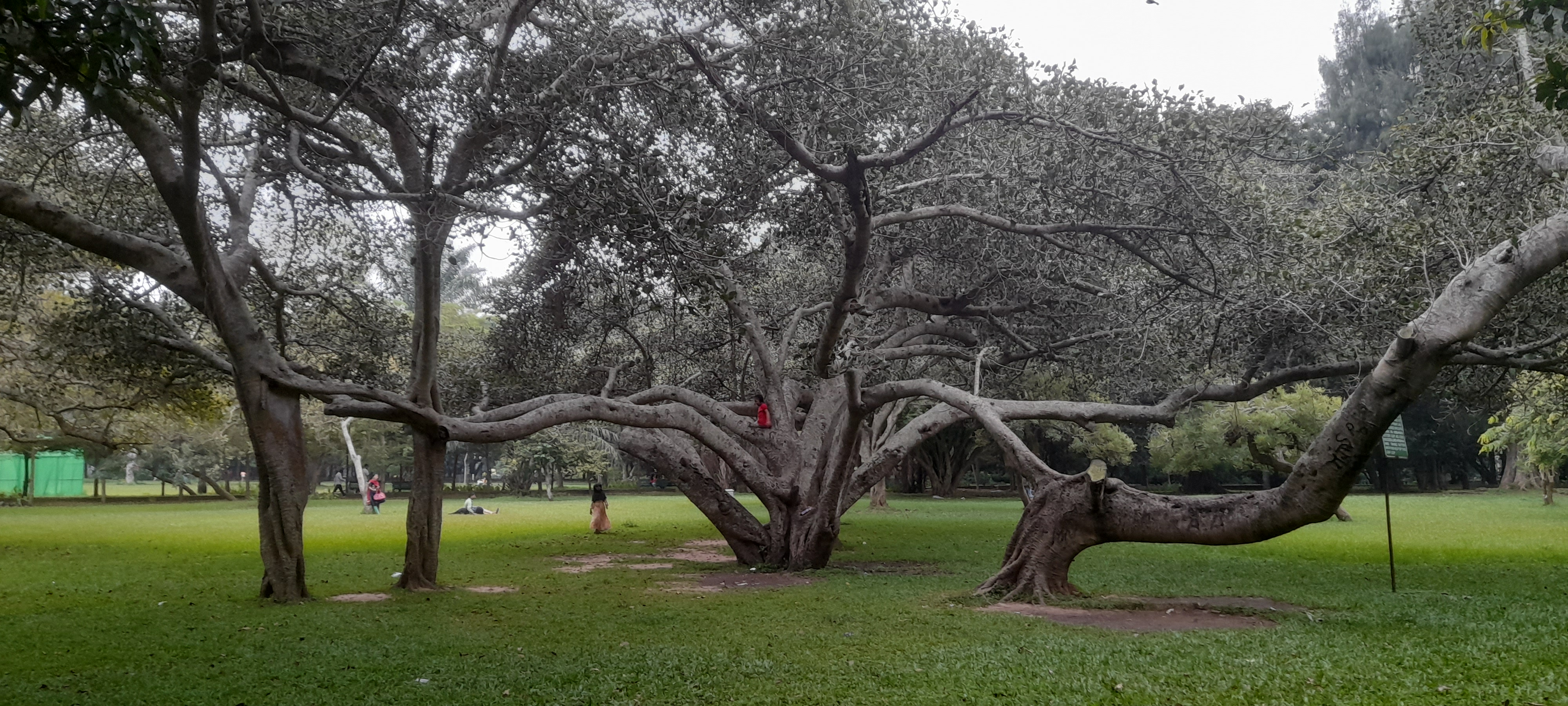
Ficus krishnae tree in Lalbagh Botanical Garden, Bengaluru

Ficus krishnae, commonly known as Krishna's buttercup or Krishna fig, is a species of fig tree belonging to the family Moraceae. It is closely related to Ficus benghalensis and is often considered a variety of it. This tree is known for its distinctive cup-shaped leaves, which, according to Hindu mythology, were used by Lord Krishna to store butter. It is native to India and has been introduced to Sri Lanka.

== Description ==
A medium to large sized, evergreen tree that can grow up-to 30m with a spreading canopy and many aerial roots. Its most distinguishing feature is its leaves, which have a unique pouch-like or cup-shaped base, ovate heart-shaped with 3 nerves. The leaves are thick, leathery, and glossy green, while velvety on both sides when young. The tree produces aerial roots that grow into robust structures, similar to the banyan tree Ficus benghalensis.

Ficus krishnae has a symbiotic relationship with wasps for pollination. The tree bears small, round figs that provide food for birds and other wildlife.

== Taxonomy ==
Ficus krishnae is classified as a fig due to its reproductive structure and ecological relationships. Like other Ficus species, it produces a specialized inflorescence called a syconium, which encloses tiny flowers within a hollow, fleshy structure. This unique adaptation facilitates pollination by fig wasps, which have a mutualistic relationship with Ficus trees. The syconium later matures into a fruit-like structure, which serves as an important food source for birds, bats, and other animals.

The species is closely related to Ficus benghalensis (Banyan tree) and is sometimes considered a variant or subspecies of it due to similarities in growth habit and aerial root development. However, its distinct cup-shaped leaves differentiate it from other Ficus species.

== Habitat and distribution ==
This species is native to the Indian subcontinent, particularly found in tropical and subtropical regions of India and Nepal. It thrives in warm, humid environments and is often cultivated near temples due to its religious significance.

== Culture ==
Ficus krishnae is also known as the "Krishna Butter Cup" due to a mythological association with Lord Krishna. According to Hindu mythology, Krishna, who was fond of butter and often stole it as a child, once attempted to hide butter by wrapping it in a leaf of this tree. As a result, the leaves of Ficus krishnae are believed to have retained their distinctive cup-like shape.

== Uses and benefits ==
=== Medicinal uses ===
Ficus krishnae has been traditionally used in Ayurvedic medicine. Various parts of the tree, including the bark, leaves, and figs, are believed to have therapeutic properties. It is used for treating digestive disorders, skin diseases, and respiratory ailments.

=== Environmental benefits ===
The tree plays an essential role in supporting biodiversity. Its figs serve as a food source for birds, bats, and insects. The tree's large canopy provides shade and helps improve air quality by absorbing pollutants.

== Gallery ==
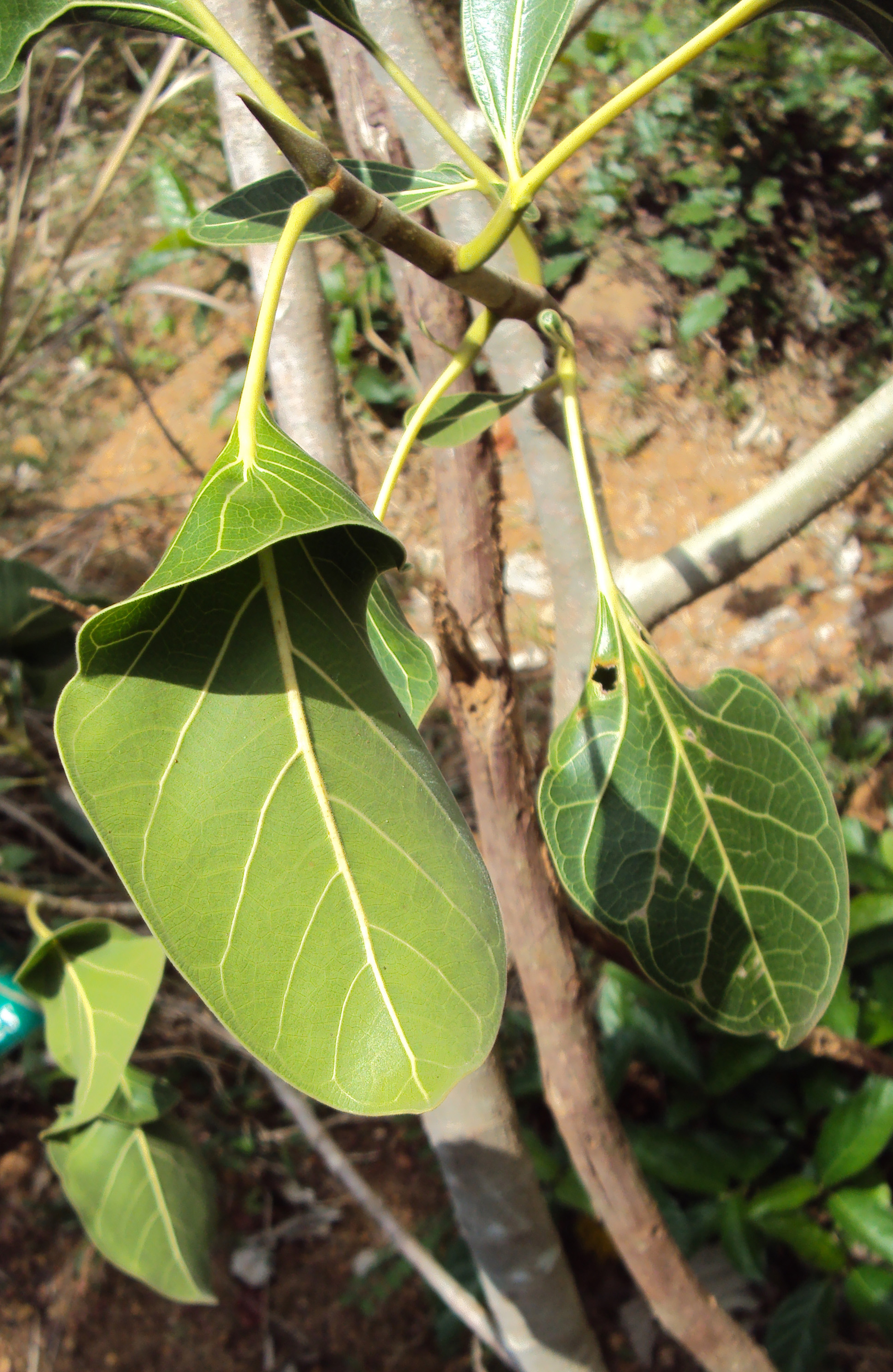
Cup shaped leaves of Ficus Krishnae

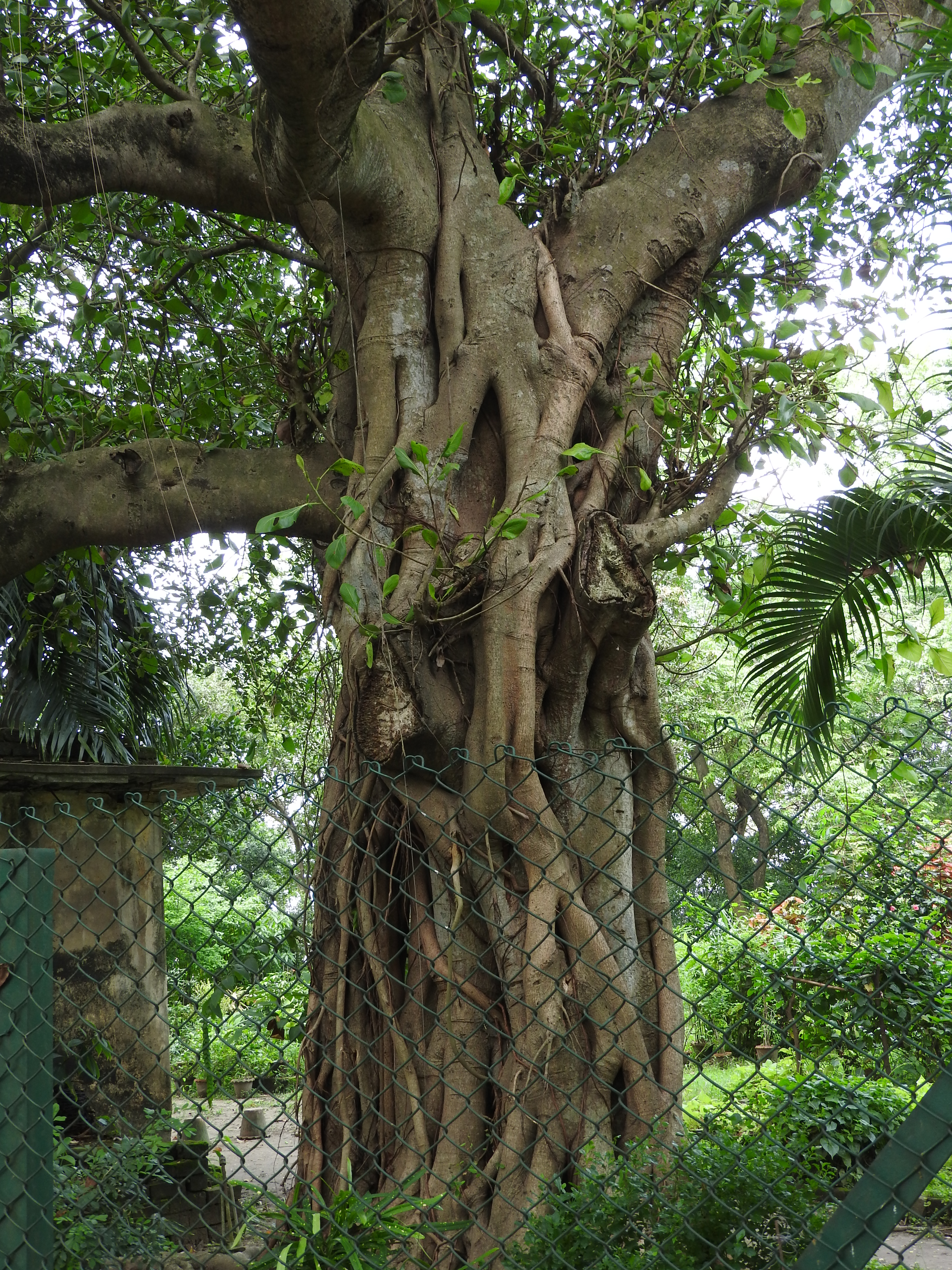
Trunk of Ficus krishnae

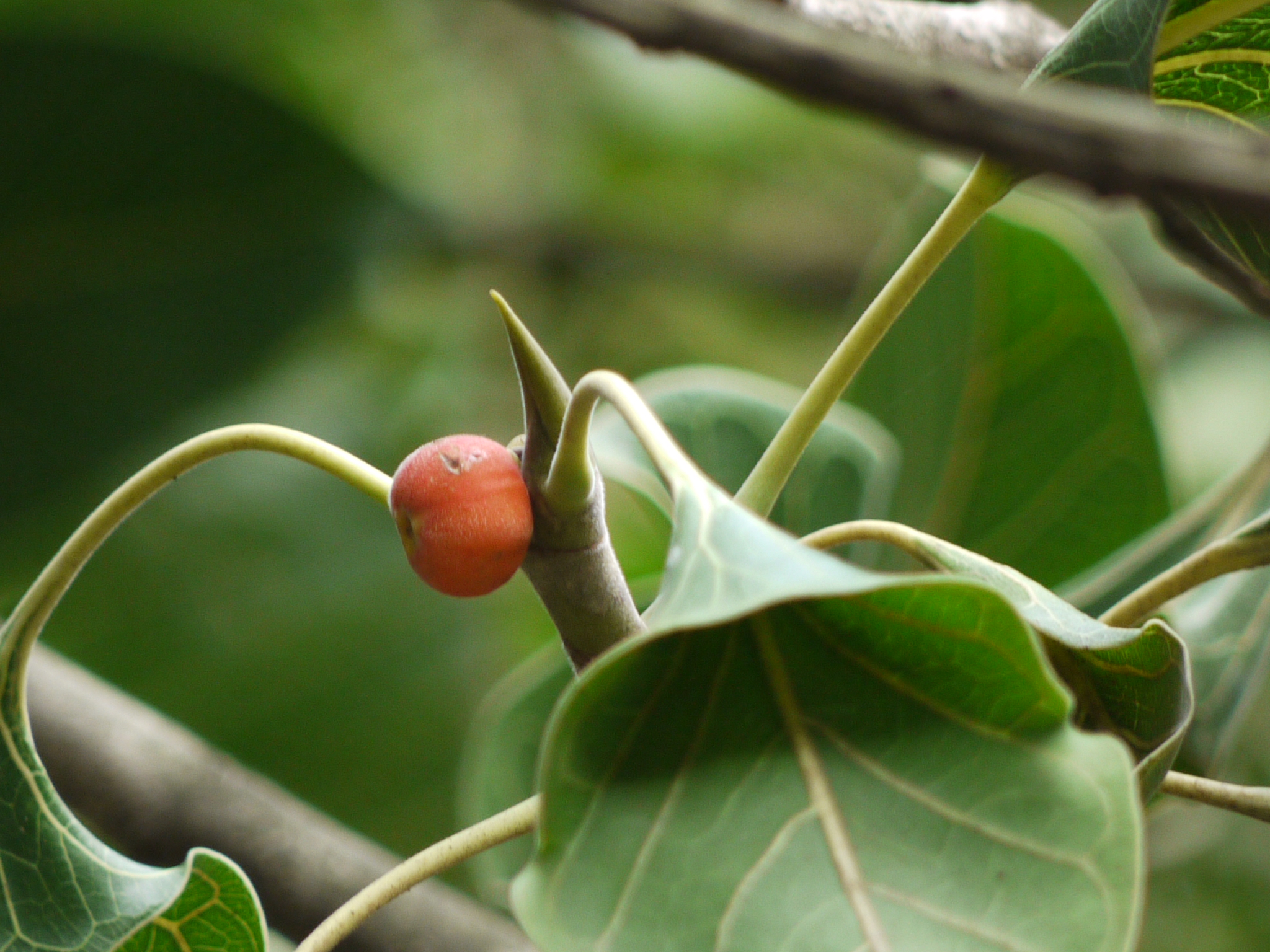
Fruiting Ficus krishnae

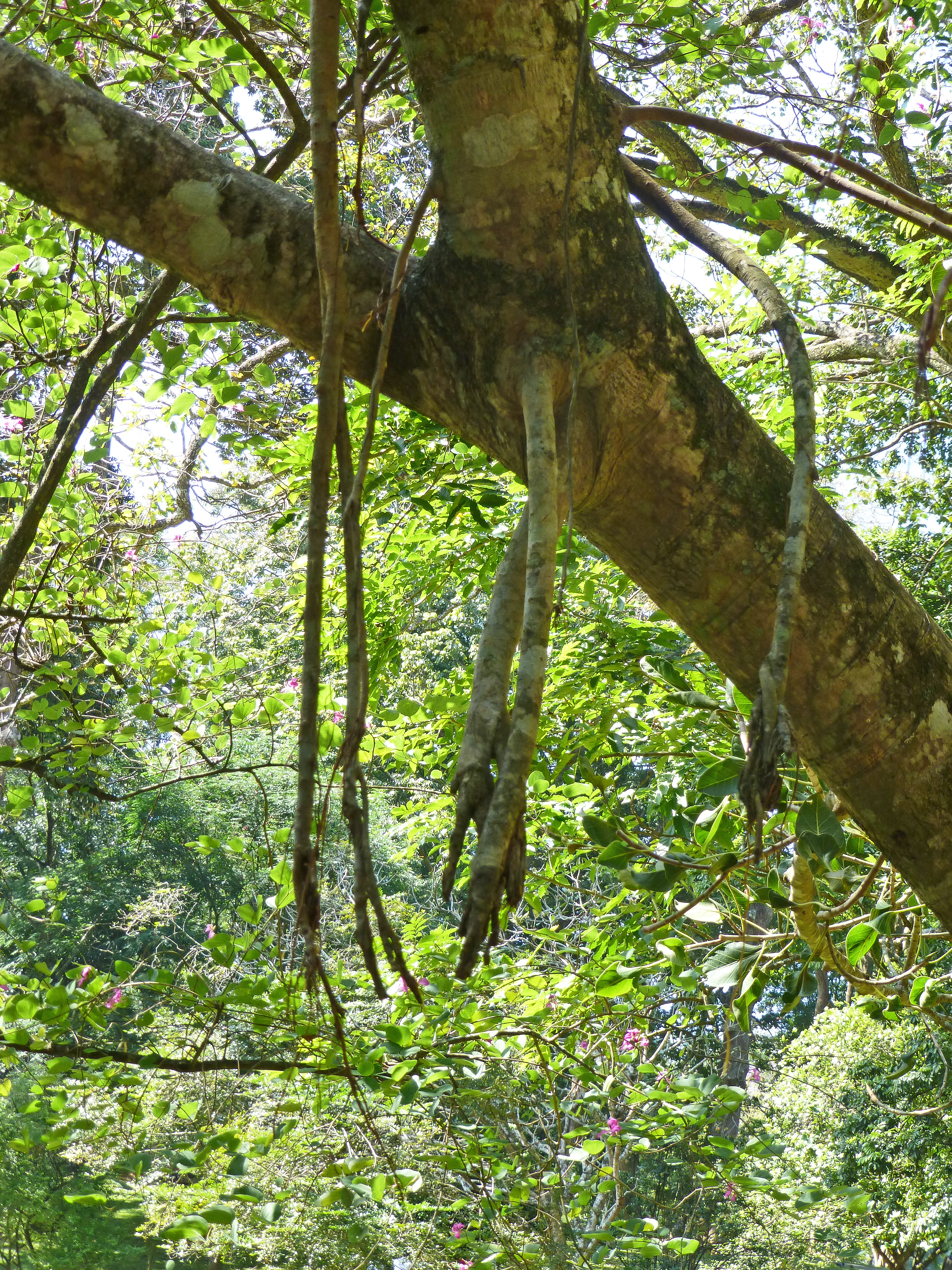
Aerial roots on Ficus krishnae
