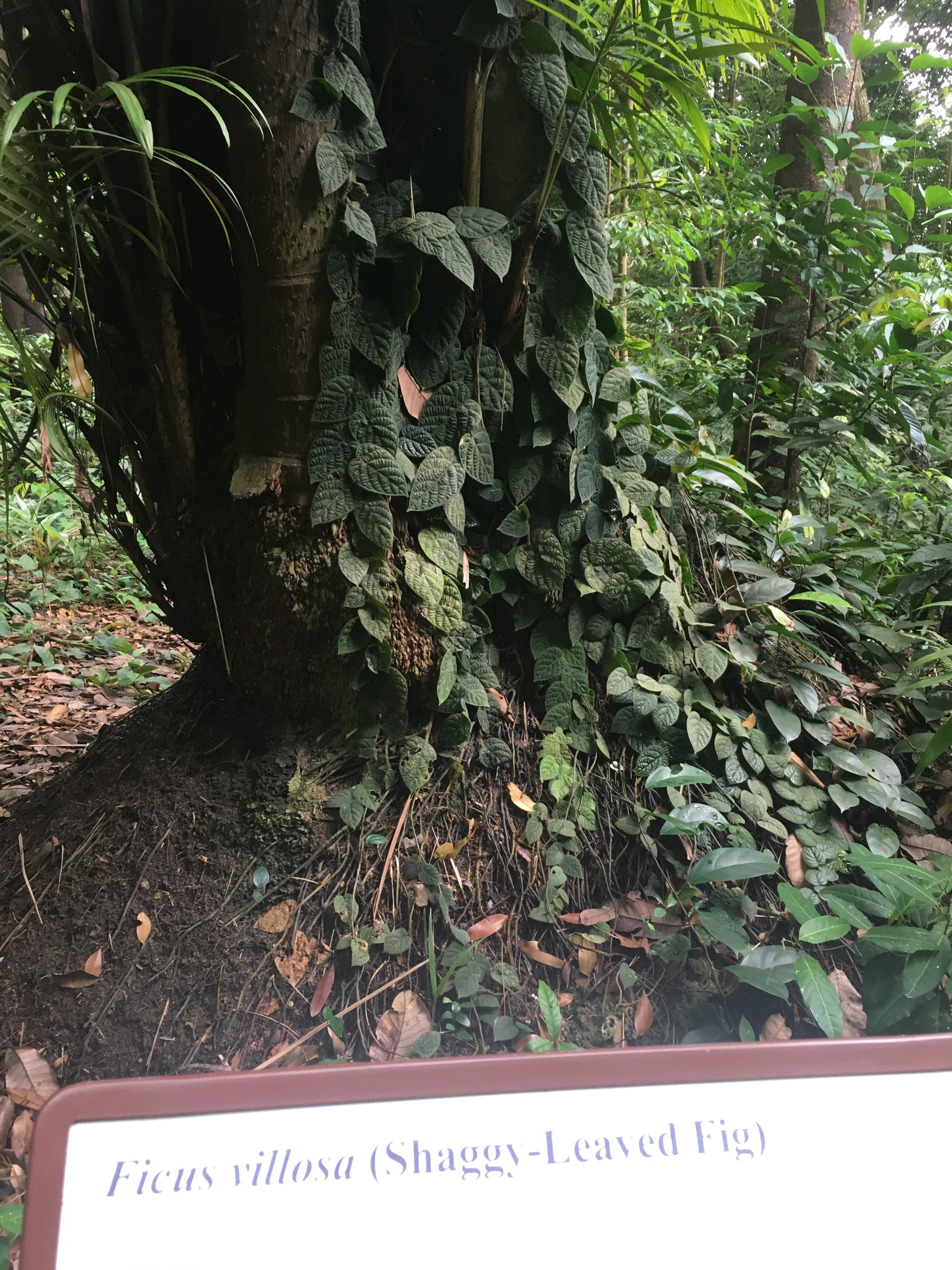

Scientific classification
- Kingdom: Plantae
- Clade: Tracheophytes
- Clade: Angiosperms
- Clade: Eudicots
- Clade: Rosids
- Order: Rosales
- Family: Moraceae
- Genus: Ficus
- Species: F. villosa

Binomial name
- Ficus villosa Blume

Synonyms
- Ficus barbata Wall. ex Miq.; Ficus grossivenis Miq.

= Ficus villosa =

Species of epiphyte

Ficus villosa, known as the shaggy-leaf fig or villous fig, is a species of Ficus native to South East Asia.

== Etymology ==
The species epithet "villosa" is derived from Latin villōsa "hairy", from villus "hair" and the adjective suffix -ōsus "full of". This refers to the fine hairs that cover the leaves of this plant.

== Biology ==
=== Description ===
F. villosa is a climbing vine that is reported to reach 2.4 m in length in the home garden, but in the wild, it will grow several feet high on trees. When fully mature, its alternate, stalked leaves have thick, leathery blades up to 30cm long with sunken venation on the upper surfaces. The heart-shaped, hairy juvenile leaves measure about 3-6 cm, and have a reddish colour which fades to green as the leaf matures. The stems of F. villosa are woody and release latex when cut. Its flowers are small, inconspicuous and cream-coloured and develop into round orange fruits.

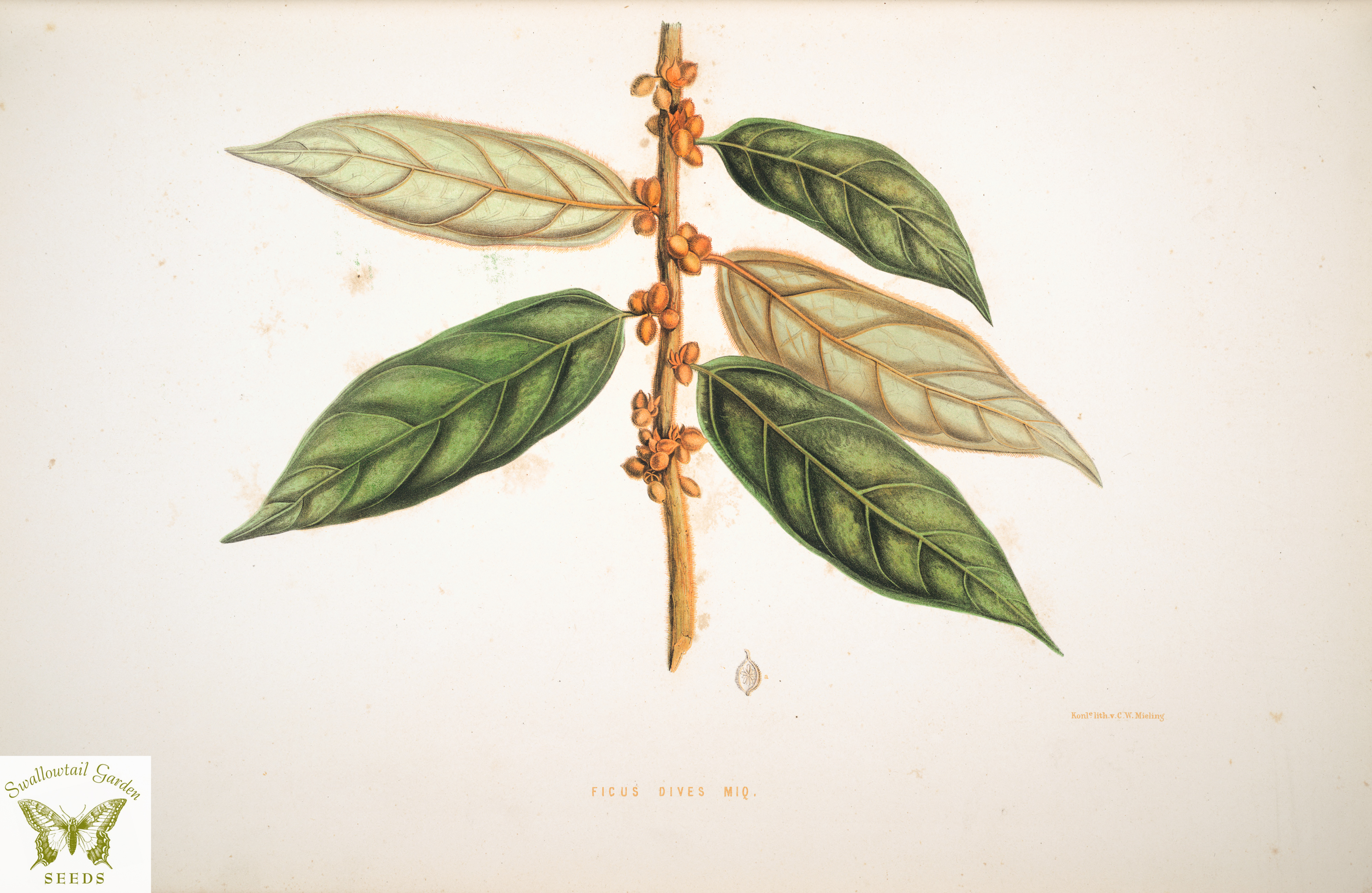
An illustration of the mature leaves

=== Distribution ===
F. villosa is found throughout Southeast Asia from northeast India, southern China, south to Java, Sulawesi and the Maluku islands of Indonesia. It is found at altitudes up to 1700 m, mainly in primary, secondary and swamp forests.

It proliferates within the Singapore Botanic Gardens where it is often seen growing scandent on Calophyllum inophyllum trees.

=== Ecology ===
F. villosa is pollinated by fig wasps and its seeds are primarily dispersed by birds and small mammals.
