= Ficus cundinamarcensis =

Conservation status
- Least Concern (IUCN 3.1)

Scientific classification
- Kingdom: Plantae
- Clade: Tracheophytes
- Clade: Angiosperms
- Clade: Eudicots
- Clade: Rosids
- Order: Rosales
- Family: Moraceae
- Genus: Ficus
- Species: F. cundinamarcensis

Binomial name
- Ficus cundinamarcensis Dugand

Species of flowering plant

Ficus cundinamarcensis, commonly known as caucho, is a species of flowering plant in the fig family (Moraceae). It is a tree endemic to Colombia, where it is known from about 20 subpopulations in the northern Andes. It grows in lowland and montane tropical rain forest and in páramo (subalpine grassland and shrubland) up to 3,400 metres elevation. It is likely pollinated by wasps of the family Agaonidae and its fruit is dispersed by birds.

The species was described by Armando Dugand in 1942.
