= List of Rosales of South Africa =

Flowering plants in the order Rosales recorded from South Africa

Rosales is an order of flowering plants. It is sister taxon to a clade consisting of Fagales and Cucurbitales. The basal clade consists of the family Rosaceae; another clade consists of four families, including Rhamnaceae; and the third clade consists of the four urticalean families. The order Rosales is strongly supported as monophyletic in phylogenetic analyses of DNA sequences.

The anthophytes are a grouping of plant taxa bearing flower-like reproductive structures. They were formerly thought to be a clade comprising plants bearing flower-like structures. The group contained the angiosperms - the extant flowering plants, such as roses and grasses - as well as the Gnetales and the extinct Bennettitales.

23,420 species of vascular plant have been recorded in South Africa, making it the sixth most species-rich country in the world and the most species-rich country on the African continent. Of these, 153 species are considered to be threatened. Nine biomes have been described in South Africa: Fynbos, Succulent Karoo, desert, Nama Karoo, grassland, savanna, Albany thickets, the Indian Ocean coastal belt, and forests.

The 2018 South African National Biodiversity Institute's National Biodiversity Assessment plant checklist lists 35,130 taxa in the phyla Anthocerotophyta (hornworts (6)), Anthophyta (flowering plants (33534)), Bryophyta (mosses (685)), Cycadophyta (cycads (42)), Lycopodiophyta (Lycophytes(45)), Marchantiophyta (liverworts (376)), Pinophyta (conifers (33)), and Pteridophyta (cryptogams (408)).

Six families are represented in the literature. Listed taxa include species, subspecies, varieties, and forms as recorded, some of which have subsequently been allocated to other taxa as synonyms, in which cases the accepted taxon is appended to the listing. Multiple entries under alternative names reflect taxonomic revision over time.

== Cannabaceae ==
- Family: Cannabaceae,

=== Cannabis ===
Genus Cannabis:

- Cannabis sativa L. not indigenous, naturalised
  - Cannabis sativa L. var. indica (Lam.) Wehmer, not indigenous, naturalised
  - Cannabis sativa L. var. sativa, not indigenous, naturalised
  - Cannabis sativa L. var. spontanea Vavilov, not indigenous, naturalised

=== Celtis ===
Genus Celtis:

- Celtis africana Burm.f. indigenous
- Celtis australis L. not indigenous, cultivated, naturalised, invasive
- Celtis gomphophylla Baker, indigenous
- Celtis mildbraedii Engl. indigenous
- Celtis sinensis Pers. not indigenous, cultivated, naturalised, invasive

=== Chaetachme ===
Genus Chaetachme:

- Chaetachme aristata Planch. indigenous

=== Trema ===
Genus Trema:

- Trema orientalis (L.) Blume, indigenous

== Moraceae ==
- Family: Moraceae,

=== Ficus ===
Genus Ficus:

- Ficus abutilifolia (Miq.) Miq. indigenous
- Ficus bizanae Hutch. & Burtt Davy, endemic
- Ficus bubu Warb. indigenous
- Ficus burkei (Miq.) Miq. indigenous
- Ficus burtt-davyi Hutch. indigenous
  - Ficus caffra (Miq.) Miq. var. longipes Warb. accepted as Ficus ingens (Miq.) Miq. present
  - Ficus caffra (Miq.) Miq. var. natalensis Warb. accepted as Ficus ingens (Miq.) Miq. present
- Ficus capreifolia Delile, indigenous
- Ficus carica L. not indigenous, cultivated, naturalised, invasive
- Ficus cordata Thunb. indigenous
  - Ficus cordata Thunb. subsp. cordata, indigenous
  - Ficus cordata Thunb. subsp. salicifolia (Vahl) C.C.Berg, accepted as Ficus salicifolia Vahl, present
  - Ficus cordata Thunb. var. fleckii Warb. accepted as Ficus cordata Thunb. subsp. cordata
  - Ficus cordata Thunb. var. marlothii Warb. accepted as Ficus cordata Thunb. subsp. cordata
- Ficus craterostoma Warb. ex Mildbr. & Burret, indigenous
- Ficus damarensis Engl. accepted as Ficus sycomorus L. subsp. gnaphalocarpa (Miq.) C.C.Berg
- Ficus durbanii Warb. accepted as Ficus natalensis Hochst. subsp. natalensis, present
- Ficus glumosa Delile, indigenous
- Ficus guerichiana Engl. accepted as Ficus ilicina (Sond.) Miq.
- Ficus hippopotami Gerstner, accepted as Ficus trichopoda Baker, present
- Ficus ilicina (Sond.) Miq. indigenous
- Ficus ingens (Miq.) Miq. indigenous
  - Ficus ingens (Miq.) Miq. var. ingens, indigenous
- Ficus lingua De Wild. & T.Durand, indigenous
  - Ficus lingua De Wild. & T.Durand subsp. depauperata (Sim) C.C.Berg, indigenous
- Ficus lutea Vahl, indigenous
- Ficus macrophylla Desf. ex Pers. not indigenous, cultivated, naturalised, invasive
- Ficus natalensis Hochst. indigenous
  - Ficus natalensis Hochst. subsp. graniticola J.E.Burrows, indigenous
  - Ficus natalensis Hochst. subsp. natalensis, indigenous
  - Ficus natalensis Hochst. var. latifolia Warb. accepted as Ficus natalensis Hochst. subsp. natalensis, present
  - Ficus natalensis Hochst. var. puberula Warb. accepted as Ficus burkei (Miq.) Miq. present
- Ficus petersii Warb. indigenous
- Ficus phillipsii Burtt Davy & Hutch. accepted as Ficus burkei (Miq.) Miq. present
- Ficus polita Vahl, indigenous
  - Ficus polita Vahl subsp. polita, indigenous
- Ficus salicifolia Vahl, indigenous
- Ficus sansibarica Warb. indigenous
  - Ficus sansibarica Warb. subsp. sansibarica, indigenous
- Ficus soldanella Warb. accepted as Ficus abutilifolia (Miq.) Miq. present
- Ficus stuhlmannii Warb. indigenous
- Ficus sur Forssk. indigenous
- Ficus sycomorus L. indigenous
  - Ficus sycomorus L. subsp. gnaphalocarpa (Miq.) C.C.Berg, indigenous
  - Ficus sycomorus L. subsp. sycomorus, indigenous
- Ficus tettensis Hutch. indigenous
- Ficus thonningii Blume, indigenous
- Ficus tremula Warb. subsp. tremula, indigenous
- Ficus trichopoda Baker, indigenous
- Ficus verruculosa Warb. indigenous

=== Maclura ===
Genus Maclura:

- Maclura africana (Bureau) Corner, indigenous

=== Morus ===
Genus Morus:

- Morus alba L. not indigenous, naturalised, invasive
  - Morus alba L. var. alba, not indigenous, naturalised
- Morus japonica Audib. not indigenous, naturalised
- Morus mesozygia Stapf ex A.Chev. indigenous

=== Sycomorus ===
Genus Sycomorus:

- Sycomorus hirsuta Sond. accepted as Ficus glumosa Delile, present

=== Trilepisium ===
Genus Trilepisium:

- Trilepisium madagascariense DC. indigenous

== Rhamnaceae ==
- Family: Rhamnaceae,

=== Berchemia ===
Genus Berchemia:

- Berchemia discolor (Klotzsch) Hemsl. indigenous
- Berchemia zeyheri (Sond.) Grubov, indigenous

=== Colubrina ===
Genus Colubrina:

- Colubrina nicholsonii A.E.van Wyk & Schrire, endemic

=== Helinus ===
Genus Helinus:

- Helinus integrifolius (Lam.) Kuntze, indigenous
- Helinus spartioides (Engl.) Schinz ex Engl. indigenous

=== Lasiodiscus ===
Genus Lasiodiscus:

- Lasiodiscus pervillei Baill. indigenous
  - Lasiodiscus pervillei Baill. subsp. pervillei, indigenous

=== Noltea ===
Genus Noltea:

- Noltea africana (L.) Endl. endemic

=== Phylica ===
Genus Phylica:

- Phylica abietina Eckl. & Zeyh. endemic
- Phylica acmaephylla Eckl. & Zeyh. endemic
- Phylica aemula Schltr. indigenous
  - Phylica aemula Schltr. var. aemula, endemic
  - Phylica aemula Schltr. var. multibracteolata Pillans, endemic
- Phylica affinis Sond. endemic
- Phylica agathosmoides Pillans, endemic
- Phylica alba Pillans, endemic
- Phylica alpina Eckl. & Zeyh. endemic
- Phylica alticola Pillans, endemic
- Phylica altigena Schltr. endemic
- Phylica ambigua Sond. endemic
- Phylica amoena Pillans, endemic
- Phylica ampliata Pillans, endemic
- Phylica anomala Pillans, endemic
- Phylica apiculata Sond. endemic
- Phylica atrata Licht. ex Roem. & Schult. endemic
- Phylica axillaris Lam. indigenous
  - Phylica axillaris Lam. var. axillaris, endemic
  - Phylica axillaris Lam. var. cooperi Pillans, endemic
  - Phylica axillaris Lam. var. densifolia Pillans, endemic
  - Phylica axillaris Lam. var. gracilis Pillans, endemic
  - Phylica axillaris Lam. var. hirsuta Sond. endemic
  - Phylica axillaris Lam. var. lutescens (Eckl. & Zeyh.) Pillans, endemic
  - Phylica axillaris Lam. var. maritima Pillans, endemic
  - Phylica axillaris Lam. var. microphylla (Eckl. & Zeyh.) Pillans, endemic
  - Phylica axillaris Lam. var. pulchra Pillans, endemic
- Phylica barbata Pillans, endemic
- Phylica barnardii Pillans, endemic
- Phylica bolusii Pillans, endemic
- Phylica brachycephala Sond. endemic
- Phylica brevifolia Eckl. & Zeyh. endemic
- Phylica burchellii Pillans, endemic
- Phylica buxifolia L. endemic
- Phylica calcarata Pillans, endemic
- Phylica callosa L.f. endemic
- Phylica cephalantha Sond. endemic
- Phylica chionocephala Schltr. endemic
- Phylica chionophila Schltr. endemic
- Phylica comosa Steud. endemic
- Phylica comptonii Pillans, endemic
- Phylica confusa Pillans, endemic
- Phylica constricta Pillans, indigenous
  - Phylica constricta Pillans var. constricta, endemic
  - Phylica constricta Pillans var. staavioides Pillans, endemic
- Phylica costata Pillans, endemic
- Phylica cryptandroides Sond. endemic
- Phylica curvifolia Pillans, endemic
- Phylica cuspidata Eckl. & Zeyh. indigenous
  - Phylica cuspidata Eckl. & Zeyh. var. cuspidata, endemic
  - Phylica cuspidata Eckl. & Zeyh. var. minor Pillans, endemic
- Phylica cylindrica J.C.Wendl. endemic
- Phylica debilis Eckl. & Zeyh. indigenous
  - Phylica debilis Eckl. & Zeyh. var. debilis, endemic
  - Phylica debilis Eckl. & Zeyh. var. fourcadei Pillans, endemic
- Phylica diffusa Pillans, indigenous
  - Phylica diffusa Pillans var. burchellii Pillans, endemic
  - Phylica diffusa Pillans var. diffusa, endemic
- Phylica dioica L. endemic
- Phylica diosmoides Sond. endemic
- Phylica disticha Eckl. & Zeyh. indigenous
  - Phylica disticha Eckl. & Zeyh. var. cuneata Pillans, endemic
  - Phylica disticha Eckl. & Zeyh. var. disticha, endemic
- Phylica dodii N.E.Br. endemic
- Phylica elimensis Pillans, endemic
- Phylica ericoides L. indigenous
  - Phylica ericoides L. var. ericoides, endemic
  - Phylica ericoides L. var. montana Pillans, endemic
  - Phylica ericoides L. var. muirii Pillans, endemic
  - Phylica ericoides L. var. pauciflora Pillans, endemic
  - Phylica ericoides L. var. zeyheri Pillans, endemic
- Phylica excelsa J.C.Wendl. indigenous
  - Phylica excelsa J.C.Wendl. var. excelsa, endemic
  - Phylica excelsa J.C.Wendl. var. papillosa (J.C.Wendl.) Sond. endemic
- Phylica floccosa Pillans, endemic
- Phylica floribunda Pillans, endemic
- Phylica fourcadei Pillans, endemic
- Phylica fruticosa Schltr. endemic
- Phylica galpinii Pillans, endemic
- Phylica glabrata Thunb. endemic
- Phylica gnidioides Eckl. & Zeyh. endemic
- Phylica gracilis (Eckl. & Zeyh.) D.Dietr. endemic
- Phylica greyii Pillans, endemic
- Phylica guthriei Pillans, endemic
- Phylica harveyi (Arn.) Pillans, endemic
- Phylica hirta Pillans, endemic
- Phylica humilis Sond. endemic
- Phylica imberbis P.J.Bergius, indigenous
  - Phylica imberbis P.J.Bergius var. eriophoros (P.J.Bergius) Pillans, endemic
  - Phylica imberbis P.J.Bergius var. imberbis, endemic
  - Phylica imberbis P.J.Bergius var. secunda Sond. endemic
- Phylica incurvata Pillans, endemic
- Phylica insignis Pillans, endemic
- Phylica intrusa Pillans, endemic
- Phylica karroica Pillans, endemic
- Phylica keetii Pillans, indigenous
  - Phylica keetii Pillans var. keetii, endemic
  - Phylica keetii Pillans var. mollis Pillans, endemic
- Phylica lachneaeoides Pillans, endemic
- Phylica laevifolia Pillans, endemic
- Phylica laevigata Pillans, endemic
- Phylica laevis (Eckl. & Zeyh.) Steud. endemic
- Phylica lanata Pillans, endemic
- Phylica lasiantha Pillans, endemic
- Phylica lasiocarpa Sond. endemic
- Phylica leipoldtii Pillans, endemic
- Phylica levynsiae Pillans, endemic
- Phylica linifolia Pillans, endemic
- Phylica litoralis (Eckl. & Zeyh.) D.Dietr. endemic
- Phylica longimontana Pillans, endemic
- Phylica lucens Pillans, endemic
- Phylica lucida Pillans, endemic
- Phylica mairei Pillans, endemic
- Phylica marlothii Pillans, indigenous
  - Phylica marlothii Pillans var. crassa Pillans, endemic
  - Phylica marlothii Pillans var. levynsiae Pillans, endemic
  - Phylica marlothii Pillans var. marlothii, endemic
- Phylica maximiliani Schltr. endemic
- Phylica meyeri Sond. endemic
- Phylica minutiflora Sond. endemic
- Phylica montana Sond. endemic
- Phylica mundii Pillans, endemic
- Phylica natalensis Pillans, endemic
- Phylica nervosa Pillans, endemic
- Phylica nigrita Sond. endemic
- Phylica nigromontana Pillans, endemic
- Phylica nodosa Pillans, endemic
- Phylica obtusifolia Pillans, endemic
- Phylica odorata Schltr. endemic
- Phylica oleifolia Vent. endemic
- Phylica paniculata Willd. indigenous
- Phylica parviflora P.J.Bergius, endemic
- Phylica parvula Pillans, endemic
- Phylica pauciflora Pillans, endemic
- Phylica pearsonii Pillans, endemic
- Phylica pinea Thunb. endemic
- Phylica piquetbergensis Pillans, endemic
- Phylica plumigera Pillans, endemic
- Phylica plumosa L. indigenous
  - Phylica plumosa L. var. horizontalis (Vent.) Sond. endemic
  - Phylica plumosa L. var. plumosa, endemic
  - Phylica plumosa L. var. squarrosa (Vent.) Sond. endemic
- Phylica propinqua Sond. endemic
- Phylica pubescens Aiton, indigenous
  - Phylica pubescens Aiton var. angustifolia Sond. endemic
  - Phylica pubescens Aiton var. orientalis Pillans, endemic
  - Phylica pubescens Aiton var. pubescens, endemic
- Phylica pulchella Schltr. endemic
- Phylica purpurea Sond. indigenous
  - Phylica purpurea Sond. var. floccosa Pillans, endemic
  - Phylica purpurea Sond. var. pearsonii Pillans, endemic
  - Phylica purpurea Sond. var. purpurea, endemic
- Phylica pustulata E.Phillips, endemic
- Phylica radiata L. accepted as Staavia radiata (L.) Dahl, indigenous
- Phylica recurvifolia Eckl. & Zeyh. endemic
- Phylica retorta Pillans, endemic
- Phylica retrorsa E.Mey. ex Sond. endemic
- Phylica reversa Pillans, endemic
- Phylica rigida Eckl. & Zeyh. endemic
- Phylica rigidifolia Sond. endemic
- Phylica rogersii Pillans, endemic
- Phylica rubra Willd. ex Roem. & Schult. endemic
- Phylica salteri Pillans, endemic
- Phylica schlechteri Pillans, endemic
- Phylica selaginoides Sond. endemic
- Phylica sericea Pillans, endemic
- Phylica simii Pillans, endemic
- Phylica spicata L.f. indigenous
  - Phylica spicata L.f. var. piquetbergensis Pillans, endemic
  - Phylica spicata L.f. var. spicata, endemic
- Phylica stenantha Pillans, endemic
- Phylica stenopetala Schltr. indigenous
  - Phylica stenopetala Schltr. var. sieberi Pillans, endemic
  - Phylica stenopetala Schltr. var. stenopetala, endemic
- Phylica stipularis L. accepted as Trichocephalus stipularis (L.) Brongn. present
- Phylica stokoei Pillans, endemic
- Phylica strigosa P.J.Bergius, indigenous
  - Phylica strigosa P.J.Bergius var. australis Pillans, endemic
  - Phylica strigosa P.J.Bergius var. dregei Pillans, endemic
  - Phylica strigosa P.J.Bergius var. elongata Pillans, endemic
  - Phylica strigosa P.J.Bergius var. macowanii Pillans, endemic
  - Phylica strigosa P.J.Bergius var. strigosa, endemic
- Phylica strigulosa Sond. indigenous
- Phylica subulifolia Pillans, endemic
- Phylica thodei E.Phillips, indigenous
- Phylica thunbergiana Sond. endemic
- Phylica tortuosa E.Mey. ex Harv. & Sond. endemic
- Phylica trachyphylla (Eckl. & Zeyh.) D.Dietr. endemic
- Phylica trichotoma Thunb. accepted as Staavia trichotoma (Thunb.) Pillans, endemic
- Phylica tuberculata Pillans, endemic
- Phylica tubulosa Schltr. endemic
- Phylica tysonii Pillans, indigenous
  - Phylica tysonii Pillans var. brevifolia Pillans, endemic
  - Phylica tysonii Pillans var. tysonii, endemic
- Phylica variabilis Pillans, endemic
- Phylica velutina Sond. endemic
- Phylica villosa Thunb. indigenous
  - Phylica villosa Thunb. var. pedicellata (DC.) Sond. endemic
  - Phylica villosa Thunb. var. villosa, endemic
- Phylica virgata (Eckl. & Zeyh.) D.Dietr. endemic
- Phylica vulgaris Pillans, indigenous
  - Phylica vulgaris Pillans var. burchellii Pillans, endemic
  - Phylica vulgaris Pillans var. major Pillans, endemic
  - Phylica vulgaris Pillans var. vulgaris, endemic
- Phylica willdenowiana Eckl. & Zeyh. endemic
- Phylica wittebergensis Pillans, endemic

=== Rhamnus ===
Genus Rhamnus:

- Rhamnus prinoides L'Her. indigenous
- Rhamnus tetragona L.f. accepted as Lauridia tetragona (L.f.) R.H.Archer, present

=== Scutia ===
Genus Scutia:

- Scutia myrtina (Burm.f.) Kurz, indigenous

=== Trichocephalus ===
Genus Trichocephalus:

- Trichocephalus stipularis (L.) Brongn. endemic

=== Ziziphus ===
Genus Ziziphus:

- Ziziphus mauritiana Lam. not indigenous, naturalised
- Ziziphus mucronata Willd. indigenous
  - Ziziphus mucronata Willd. subsp. mucronata, indigenous
- Ziziphus rivularis Codd, indigenous
- Ziziphus zeyheriana Sond. indigenous

== Rosaceae ==
- Family: Rosaceae,

=== Acaena ===
Genus Acaena:

- Acaena latebrosa Aiton, endemic

=== Agrimonia ===
Genus Agrimonia:

- Agrimonia bracteata E.Mey. ex C.A.Mey. indigenous
- Agrimonia procera Wallr. not indigenous, naturalised, invasive

=== Alchemilla ===
Genus Alchemilla:

- Alchemilla bakeri De Wild. endemic
- Alchemilla bicarpellata Rothm. endemic
- Alchemilla bolusii De Wild. endemic
- Alchemilla capensis Thunb. endemic
- Alchemilla colura Hilliard, indigenous
- Alchemilla cryptantha Steud. ex A.Rich. indigenous
- Alchemilla elongata Eckl. & Zeyh. indigenous
  - Alchemilla elongata Eckl. & Zeyh. var. elongata, indigenous
  - Alchemilla elongata Eckl. & Zeyh. var. platyloba Rothm. endemic
- Alchemilla galpinii Hauman & Balle, endemic
- Alchemilla hirsuto-petiolata (De Wild.) Rothm. endemic
- Alchemilla incurvata Gand. endemic
- Alchemilla kiwuensis Engl. indigenous
- Alchemilla natalensis Engl. indigenous
- Alchemilla quinqueloba Rothm. endemic
- Alchemilla rehmannii Engl. endemic
- Alchemilla schlechteriana Rothm. endemic
- Alchemilla woodii Kuntze, indigenous

=== Cliffortia ===
Genus Cliffortia:

- Cliffortia acanthophylla C.M.Whitehouse, endemic
- Cliffortia acockii Weim. endemic
- Cliffortia aculeata Weim. endemic
- Cliffortia acutifolia Weim. endemic
- Cliffortia alata N.E.Br. endemic
- Cliffortia amplexistipula Schltr. endemic
- Cliffortia anthospermoides Fellingham, indigenous
- Cliffortia apiculata Weim. endemic
- Cliffortia arborea Marloth, endemic
- Cliffortia arcuata Weim. endemic
- Cliffortia atrata Weim. endemic
- Cliffortia baccans Harv. endemic
- Cliffortia brevifolia Weim. indigenous
- Cliffortia browniana Burtt Davy, indigenous
- Cliffortia burchellii Stapf, endemic
- Cliffortia burgersii E.G.H.Oliv. & Fellingham, endemic
- Cliffortia carinata Weim. endemic
- Cliffortia castanea Weim. endemic
- Cliffortia ceresana C.M.Whitehouse, endemic
- Cliffortia cervicornu Weim. endemic
- Cliffortia complanata E.Mey. endemic
- Cliffortia concinna Weim. endemic
- Cliffortia conifera E.G.H.Oliv. & Fellingham, endemic
- Cliffortia crassinervis Weim. endemic
- Cliffortia crenata L.f. endemic
- Cliffortia crenulata Weim. endemic
- Cliffortia cristata Weim. endemic
- Cliffortia cruciata C.M.Whitehouse, indigenous
- Cliffortia cuneata Aiton, endemic
- Cliffortia curvifolia Weim. endemic
- Cliffortia cymbifolia Weim. endemic
- Cliffortia densa Weim. endemic
- Cliffortia dentata Willd. endemic
- Cliffortia denticulata (Weim.) C.M.Whitehouse, endemic
- Cliffortia dichotoma Fellingham, endemic
- Cliffortia discolor Weim. endemic
- Cliffortia dispar Weim. endemic
- Cliffortia dodecandra Weim. endemic
- Cliffortia dracomontana C.M.Whitehouse, indigenous
- Cliffortia dregeana C.Presl, indigenous
  - Cliffortia dregeana C.Presl var. dregeana, endemic
  - Cliffortia dregeana C.Presl var. meyeriana (C.Presl) Weim. endemic
- Cliffortia drepanoides Eckl. & Zeyh. endemic
- Cliffortia erectisepala Weim. endemic
- Cliffortia ericifolia L.f. endemic
- Cliffortia eriocephalina Cham. endemic
- Cliffortia esterhuyseniae Weim. endemic
- Cliffortia exilifolia Weim. endemic
- Cliffortia falcata L.f. endemic
- Cliffortia fasciculata Weim. endemic
- Cliffortia ferricola C.M.Whitehouse, indigenous
- Cliffortia ferruginea L.f. endemic
- Cliffortia filicaulis Schltdl. indigenous
  - Cliffortia filicaulis Schltdl. var. filicaulis, endemic
  - Cliffortia filicaulis Schltdl. var. octandra (Cham.) Weim. endemic
- Cliffortia filicauloides Weim. indigenous
- Cliffortia filifolia L.f. endemic
- Cliffortia geniculata Weim. endemic
- Cliffortia glauca Weim. endemic
- Cliffortia gracilis Harv. endemic
- Cliffortia gracillima C.M.Whitehouse, indigenous
- Cliffortia graminea L.f. indigenous
  - Cliffortia graminea L.f. var. convoluta Weim. endemic
  - Cliffortia graminea L.f. var. elegans Weim. endemic
  - Cliffortia graminea L.f. var. graminea, endemic
- Cliffortia grandifolia Eckl. & Zeyh. endemic
  - Cliffortia grandifolia Eckl. & Zeyh. var. denticulata Weim. accepted as Cliffortia denticulata (Weim.) C.M.Whitehouse, present
  - Cliffortia grandifolia Eckl. & Zeyh. var. grandifolia, indigenous
  - Cliffortia grandifolia Eckl. & Zeyh. var. recurvata Weim. accepted as Cliffortia recurvata (Weim.) C.M.Whitehouse, present
- Cliffortia hantamensis Diels, endemic
- Cliffortia hermaphroditica Weim. endemic
- Cliffortia heterophylla Weim. endemic
- Cliffortia hexandra Weim. endemic
- Cliffortia hirsuta Eckl. & Zeyh. endemic
- Cliffortia hirta Burm.f. endemic
- Cliffortia ilicifolia L. indigenous
  - Cliffortia ilicifolia L. var. cordifolia (Lam.) Harv. endemic
  - Cliffortia ilicifolia L. var. ilicifolia, endemic
  - Cliffortia ilicifolia L. var. incisa Harv. endemic
  - Cliffortia ilicifolia L. var. reniformis Weim. accepted as Cliffortia reniformis (Weim.) C.M.Whitehouse, present
  - Cliffortia ilicifolia L. var. schlechteri Weim. accepted as Cliffortia schlechteri (Weim.) C.M.Whitehouse, present
- Cliffortia incana Weim. endemic
- Cliffortia integerrima Weim. endemic
- Cliffortia intermedia Eckl. & Zeyh. endemic
- Cliffortia juniperina L.f. indigenous
  - Cliffortia juniperina L.f. var. juniperina, endemic
  - Cliffortia juniperina L.f. var. pilosula Weim. endemic
- Cliffortia lanata Weim. endemic
- Cliffortia lanceolata Weim. endemic
- Cliffortia lepida Weim. endemic
- Cliffortia linearifolia Eckl. & Zeyh. indigenous
- Cliffortia longifolia (Eckl. & Zeyh.) Weim. endemic
- Cliffortia marginata Eckl. & Zeyh. endemic
- Cliffortia micrantha Weim. endemic
- Cliffortia mirabilis Weim. endemic
- Cliffortia monophylla Weim. endemic
- Cliffortia montana Weim. endemic
- Cliffortia multiformis Weim. endemic
- Cliffortia neglecta Schltr. endemic
- Cliffortia nitidula (Engl.) R.E.Fr. & T.C.E.Fr. indigenous
  - Cliffortia nitidula (Engl.) R.E.Fr. & T.C.E.Fr. subsp. nitidula, indigenous
  - Cliffortia nitidula (Engl.) R.E.Fr. & T.C.E.Fr. subsp. pilosa Weim. indigenous
- Cliffortia nivenioides Fellingham, endemic
- Cliffortia obcordata L.f. endemic
- Cliffortia obovata E.Mey. endemic
- Cliffortia odorata L.f. endemic
- Cliffortia oligodonta C.M.Whitehouse, endemic
- Cliffortia ovalis Weim. endemic
- Cliffortia paucistaminea Weim. indigenous
  - Cliffortia paucistaminea Weim. var. australis C.M.Whitehouse, endemic
  - Cliffortia paucistaminea Weim. var. paucistaminea, indigenous
- Cliffortia pedunculata Schltr. endemic
- Cliffortia perpendicularis C.M.Whitehouse, indigenous
- Cliffortia phillipsii Weim. endemic
- Cliffortia phyllanthoides Schltr. endemic
- Cliffortia pilifera Bolus, endemic
- Cliffortia polita Weim. endemic
- Cliffortia polygonifolia L. indigenous
  - Cliffortia polygonifolia L. var. membranifolia Weim. endemic
  - Cliffortia polygonifolia L. var. polygonifolia, endemic
  - Cliffortia polygonifolia L. var. pubescens Weim. endemic
  - Cliffortia polygonifolia L. var. trifoliata (L.) Harv. endemic
- Cliffortia prionota C.M.Whitehouse, endemic
- Cliffortia propinqua Eckl. & Zeyh. endemic
- Cliffortia pterocarpa (Harv.) Weim. endemic
- Cliffortia pulchella L.f. indigenous
  - Cliffortia pulchella L.f. var. mucronulata Weim. endemic
  - Cliffortia pulchella L.f. var. pulchella, endemic
- Cliffortia pungens C.Presl, endemic
- Cliffortia ramosissima Schltr. indigenous
- Cliffortia recurvata (Weim.) C.M.Whitehouse, endemic
- Cliffortia reniformis (Weim.) C.M.Whitehouse, indigenous
- Cliffortia repens Schltr. indigenous
- Cliffortia reticulata Eckl. & Zeyh. endemic
- Cliffortia rigida Weim. endemic
- Cliffortia robusta Weim. endemic
- Cliffortia ruscifolia L. indigenous
  - Cliffortia ruscifolia L. var. purpurea Weim. endemic
  - Cliffortia ruscifolia L. var. ruscifolia, endemic
- Cliffortia scandens C.M.Whitehouse, indigenous
- Cliffortia schlechteri (Weim.) C.M.Whitehouse, indigenous
- Cliffortia semiteres Weim. endemic
- Cliffortia sericea Eckl. & Zeyh. endemic
- Cliffortia serpyllifolia Cham. & Schltdl. indigenous
- Cliffortia setifolia Weim. endemic
- Cliffortia sparsa C.M.Whitehouse, indigenous
- Cliffortia spathulata Weim. endemic
- Cliffortia stricta Weim. endemic
- Cliffortia strigosa Weim. endemic
- Cliffortia strobilifera L. indigenous
- Cliffortia subdura Weim. endemic
- Cliffortia subsetacea (Eckl. & Zeyh.) Diels ex Bolus & Wolley-Dod, endemic
- Cliffortia tenuis Weim. endemic
- Cliffortia teretifolia L.f. endemic
- Cliffortia theodori-friesii Weim. indigenous
  - Cliffortia theodori-friesii Weim. var. puberula Weim. endemic
  - Cliffortia theodori-friesii Weim. var. theodori-friesii, endemic
- Cliffortia tricuspidata Harv. endemic
- Cliffortia triloba Harv. endemic
- Cliffortia tuberculata (Harv.) Weim. indigenous
  - Cliffortia tuberculata (Harv.) Weim. var. muricata (Harv.) Weim. endemic
  - Cliffortia tuberculata (Harv.) Weim. var. tuberculata, endemic
- Cliffortia uncinata Weim. indigenous
  - Cliffortia uncinata Weim. var. recta Weim. endemic
  - Cliffortia uncinata Weim. var. uncinata, endemic
- Cliffortia varians Weim. endemic
- Cliffortia verrucosa Weim. endemic
- Cliffortia virgata Weim. endemic
- Cliffortia viridis Weim. endemic
- Cliffortia weimarckii C.M.Whitehouse, indigenous

=== Cotoneaster ===
Genus Cotoneaster:

- Cotoneaster coriaceus Franch. not indigenous, cultivated, naturalised
- Cotoneaster franchetii Boiss. not indigenous, naturalised, invasive
- Cotoneaster glaucophyllus Franch. not indigenous, naturalised, invasive
- Cotoneaster pannosus Franch. not indigenous, cultivated, naturalised, invasive
- Cotoneaster salicifolius Franch. not indigenous, naturalised, invasive
- Cotoneaster simonsii Baker, not indigenous, naturalised, invasive

=== Crataegus ===
Genus Crataegus:

- Crataegus monogyna Jacq. not indigenous, naturalised
- Crataegus x lavalleei Herincq ex Lavallee, not indigenous, naturalised

=== Cydonia ===
Genus Cydonia:

- Cydonia oblonga Mill. not indigenous, cultivated, naturalised

=== Duchesnea ===
Genus Duchesnea:

- Duchesnea indica (Andrews) Focke, not indigenous, naturalised, invasive

=== Eriobotrya ===
Genus Eriobotrya:

- Eriobotrya japonica (Thunb.) Lindl. not indigenous, naturalised, invasive

=== Fragaria ===
Genus Fragaria:

- Fragaria vesca L. not indigenous, naturalised

=== Geum ===
Genus Geum:

- Geum capense Thunb. indigenous

=== Leucosidea ===
Genus Leucosidea:

- Leucosidea sericea Eckl. & Zeyh. indigenous

=== Potentilla ===
Genus Potentilla:

- Potentilla supina L. indigenous

=== Prunus ===
Genus Prunus:

- Prunus africana (Hook.f.) Kalkman, indigenous
- Prunus persica (L.) Batsch, not indigenous, naturalised, invasive
  - Prunus persica (L.) Batsch var. persica, accepted as Prunus persica (L.) Batsch, not indigenous, naturalised, invasive
- Prunus salicifolia Kunth, not indigenous, cultivated, naturalised, invasive
- Prunus serotina Ehrh. not indigenous, naturalised, invasive
  - Prunus serotina Ehrh. var. serotina, not indigenous, cultivated, naturalised, invasive

=== Pyracantha ===
Genus Pyracantha:

- Pyracantha angustifolia (Franch.) C.K.Schneid. not indigenous, cultivated, naturalised, invasive
- Pyracantha coccinea M.Roem. not indigenous, cultivated, naturalised, invasive
- Pyracantha crenatoserrata (Hance) Rehder, not indigenous, cultivated, naturalised, invasive
- Pyracantha crenulata (D.Don) M.Roem. not indigenous, cultivated, naturalised, invasive
- Pyracantha koidzumii (Hayata) Rehder, not indigenous, cultivated, naturalised, invasive

=== Pyrus ===
Genus Pyrus:

- Pyrus communis L. not indigenous, naturalised

=== Rhaphiolepis ===
Genus Rhaphiolepis:

- Rhaphiolepis indica (L.) Lindl. not indigenous, cultivated, naturalised
- Rhaphiolepis umbellata (Thunb.) Makino, not indigenous, cultivated, naturalised

=== Rosa ===
Genus Rosa:

- Rosa eglanteria L. accepted as Rosa rubiginosa L. present
- Rosa multiflora Thunb. not indigenous, cultivated, naturalised, invasive
  - Rosa multiflora Thunb. ex J.Murray var. cathayensis Rehder & E.H.Wilson, not indigenous, cultivated, naturalised, invasive
  - Rosa multiflora Thunb. ex J.Murray var. welchii, not indigenous, cultivated, naturalised, invasive
- Rosa rubiginosa L. not indigenous, naturalised, invasive
- Rosa x odorata (Andrews) Sweet, not indigenous, naturalised

=== Rubus ===
Genus Rubus:

- Rubus affinis Wight & Arn. not indigenous, naturalised
- Rubus apetalus Poir. indigenous
  - Rubus apetalus Poir. var. apetalus, indigenous
- Rubus cuneifolius Pursh, not indigenous, naturalised, invasive
- Rubus ellipticus Sm. not indigenous, naturalised, invasive
- Rubus flagellaris Willd. not indigenous, naturalised, invasive
- Rubus fruticosus L. not indigenous, naturalised, invasive
- Rubus immixtus Gust. not indigenous, naturalised, invasive
- Rubus intercurrens Gust. endemic
- Rubus longepedicellatus (Gust.) C.H.Stirt. endemic
- Rubus ludwigii Eckl. & Zeyh. indigenous
  - Rubus ludwigii Eckl. & Zeyh. subsp. ludwigii, indigenous
  - Rubus ludwigii Eckl. & Zeyh. subsp. spatiosus C.H.Stirt. endemic
- Rubus niveus Thunb. not indigenous, naturalised, invasive
- Rubus pascuus L.H.Bailey, not indigenous, naturalised
- Rubus phoenicolasius Maxim. not indigenous, naturalised
- Rubus pinnatus Willd. indigenous
- Rubus rigidus Sm. indigenous
- Rubus rosifolius Sm. not indigenous, naturalised
- Rubus transvaaliensis Gust. indigenous
  - Rubus transvaaliensis Gust. var. transvaaliensis, endemic
- Rubus trifoliolatus Suess. not indigenous, naturalised
- Rubus x proteus C.H.Stirt. indigenous

=== Sanguisorba ===
Genus Sanguisorba:

- Sanguisorba minor Scop. not indigenous, naturalised
  - Sanguisorba minor Scop. subsp. muricata Briq. not indigenous, naturalised

== Ulmaceae ==
- Family: Ulmaceae,

=== Ulmus ===
Genus Ulmus:

- Ulmus minor Mill. not indigenous, cultivated, naturalised
- Ulmus parvifolia Jacq. not indigenous, cultivated, naturalised, invasive
- Ulmus procera Salisb. accepted as Ulmus minor Mill. not indigenous, cultivated, naturalised

== Urticaceae ==
- Family: Urticaceae,

=== Didymodoxa ===
Genus Didymodoxa:

- Didymodoxa caffra (Thunb.) Friis & Wilmot-Dear, indigenous
- Didymodoxa capensis (L.f.) Friis & Wilmot-Dear, indigenous
  - Didymodoxa capensis (L.f.) Friis & Wilmot-Dear var. capensis, indigenous
  - Didymodoxa capensis (L.f.) Friis & Wilmot-Dear var. integrifolia (Wedd.) Friis & Wilmot-Dear, endemic

=== Droguetia ===
Genus Droguetia:

- Droguetia ambigua Wedd. endemic
- Droguetia iners (Forssk.) Schweinf. indigenous
  - Droguetia iners (Forssk.) Schweinf. subsp. burchellii (N.E.Br.) Friis & Wilmot-Dear, endemic
  - Droguetia iners (Forssk.) Schweinf. subsp. iners, indigenous

=== Forsskaolea ===
Genus Forsskaolea:

- Forsskaolea candida L.f. indigenous
- Forsskaolea hereroensis Schinz, indigenous

=== Girardinia ===
Genus Girardinia:

- Girardinia diversifolia (Link) Friis, indigenous

=== Laportea ===
Genus Laportea:

- Laportea alatipes Hook.f. indigenous
- Laportea grossa (Wedd.) Chew, endemic
- Laportea peduncularis (Wedd.) Chew, indigenous
  - Laportea peduncularis (Wedd.) Chew subsp. latidens Friis, indigenous
  - Laportea peduncularis (Wedd.) Chew subsp. peduncularis, indigenous

=== Obetia ===
Genus Obetia:

- Obetia tenax (N.E.Br.) Friis, indigenous

=== Parietaria ===
Genus Parietaria:

- Parietaria debilis G.Forst. indigenous
- Parietaria judaica L. not indigenous, naturalised, invasive

=== Pilea ===
Genus Pilea:

- Pilea microphylla (L.) Liebm. not indigenous, naturalised
- Pilea rivularis Wedd. indigenous

=== Pouzolzia ===
Genus Pouzolzia:

- Pouzolzia mixta Solms, indigenous
  - Pouzolzia mixta Solms var. mixta, indigenous
- Pouzolzia parasitica (Forssk.) Schweinf. indigenous

=== Urera ===
Genus Urera:

- Urera trinervis (Hochst.) Friis & Immelman, indigenous

=== Urtica ===
Genus Urtica:

- Urtica dioica L. not indigenous, naturalised, invasive
- Urtica lobulata Blume, indigenous
- Urtica urens L. not indigenous, naturalised, invasive
