= Mountain fig =

Mountain fig is a common name for several plants and may refer to:

- Mountain fig, a wild growing variety of the common fig, Ficus carica
- Ficus glumosa, of the Afrotropics
