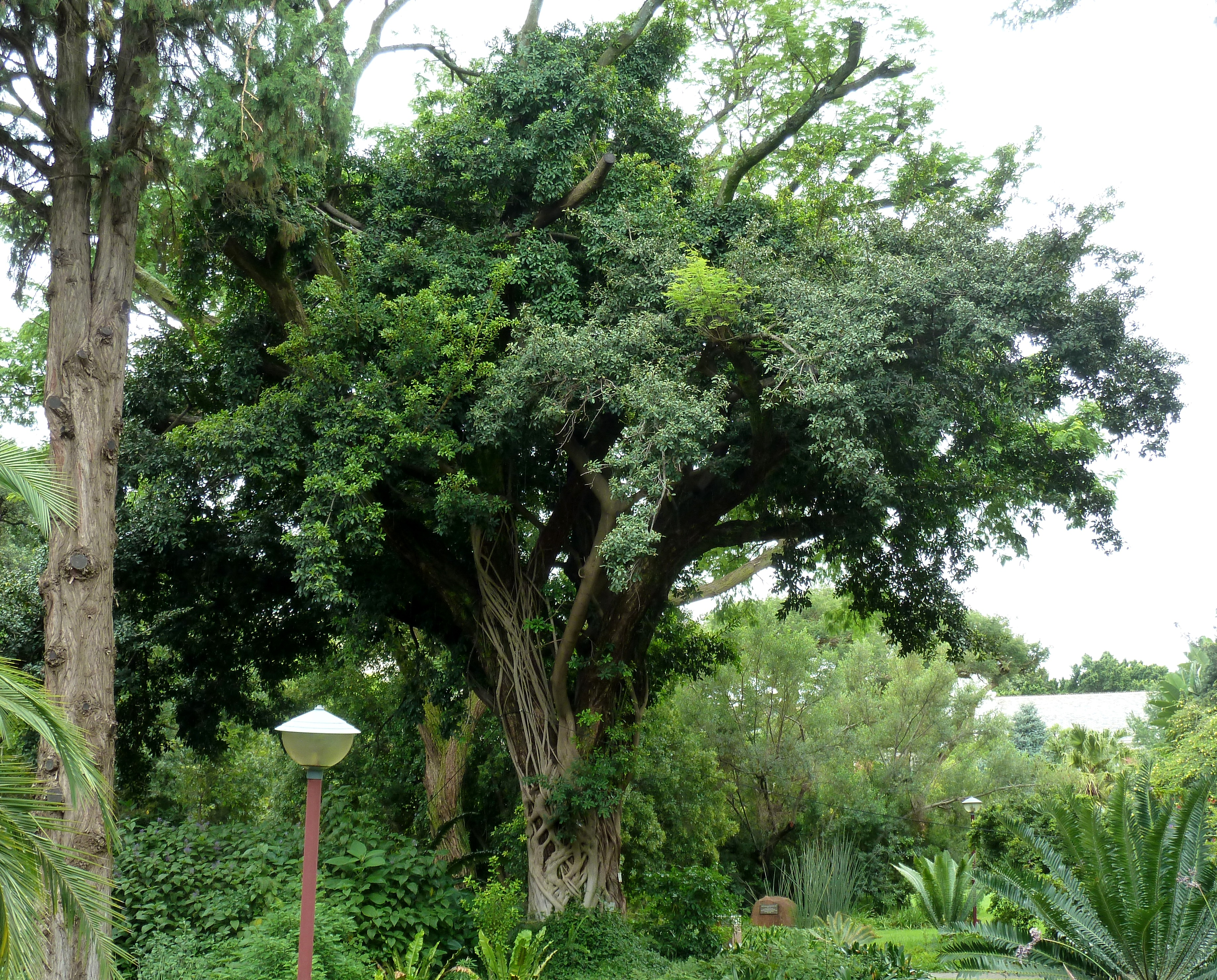
- In Pretoria, South Africa

Conservation status
- Least Concern (IUCN 3.1)

Scientific classification
- Kingdom: Plantae
- Clade: Tracheophytes
- Clade: Angiosperms
- Clade: Eudicots
- Clade: Rosids
- Order: Rosales
- Family: Moraceae
- Genus: Ficus
- Subgenus: F. subg. Urostigma
- Species: F. craterostoma

Binomial name
- Ficus craterostoma Warb. ex Mildbr. & Burret

Synonyms
- Heterotypic Synonyms: Ficus anomani Hutch.; Ficus furcata var. angustifolia De Wild.; Ficus luteola De Wild.; Ficus mutantifolia Hutch.; Ficus pilosula De Wild.; Ficus rubropunctata De Wild.; Ficus ruwenzoriensis De Wild.

= Ficus craterostoma =

Species of fig

Ficus craterostoma is a species of flowering plant in the family Moraceae. This strangler fig, is a fig shrub or tree of the Afrotropics that may grow up to 20 m tall. It is found in lowland tropical and swamp forests in the west, or in afromontane forests, including rocky situations, along Africa's eastern escarpments. The western and eastern populations may constitute separate species, as they occur at different altitudes where their ranges meet in central Africa, while they seem to have exclusive pollinating wasp species.

== Foliage ==
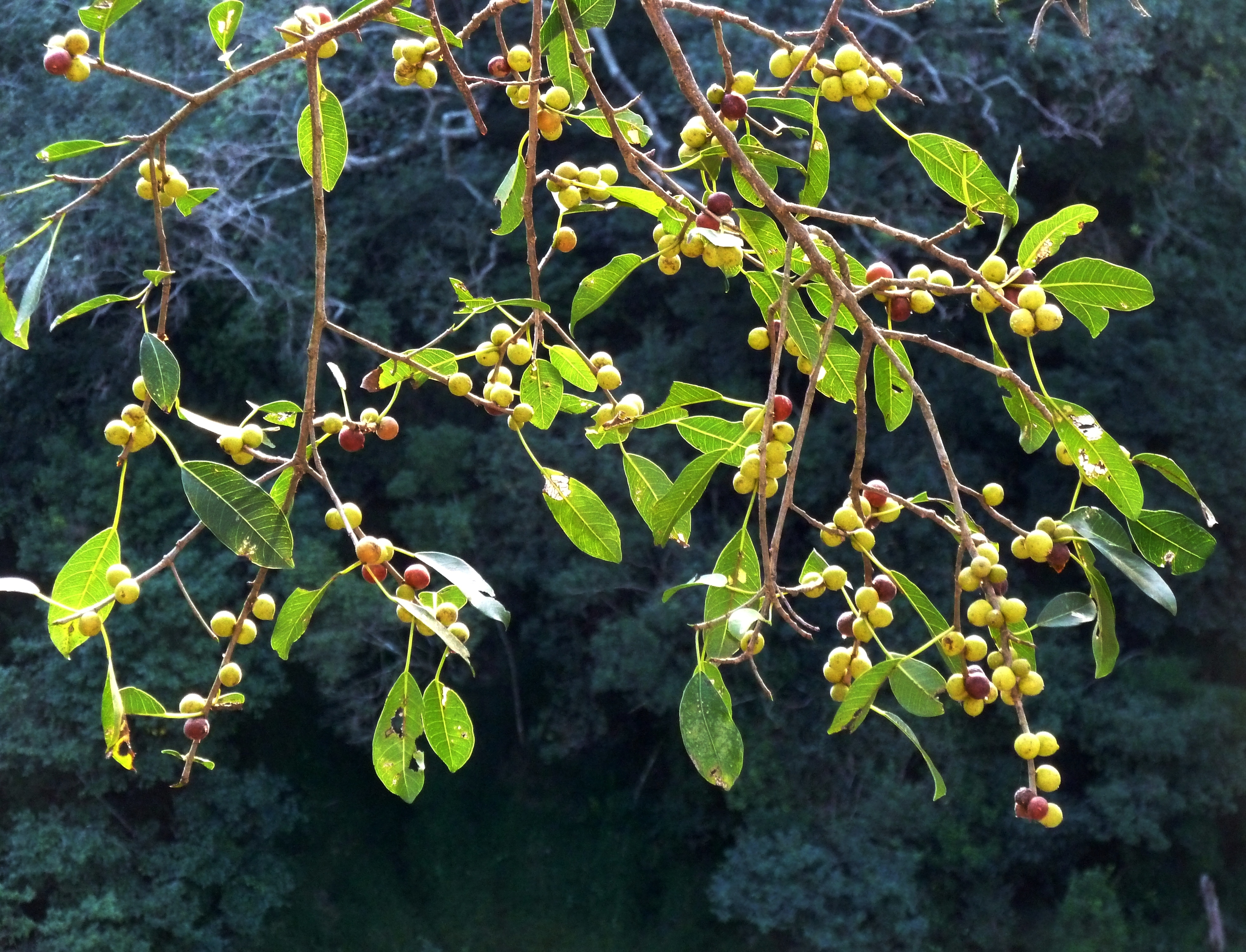
Spray with sessile, axillary figs on the terminal branchlets

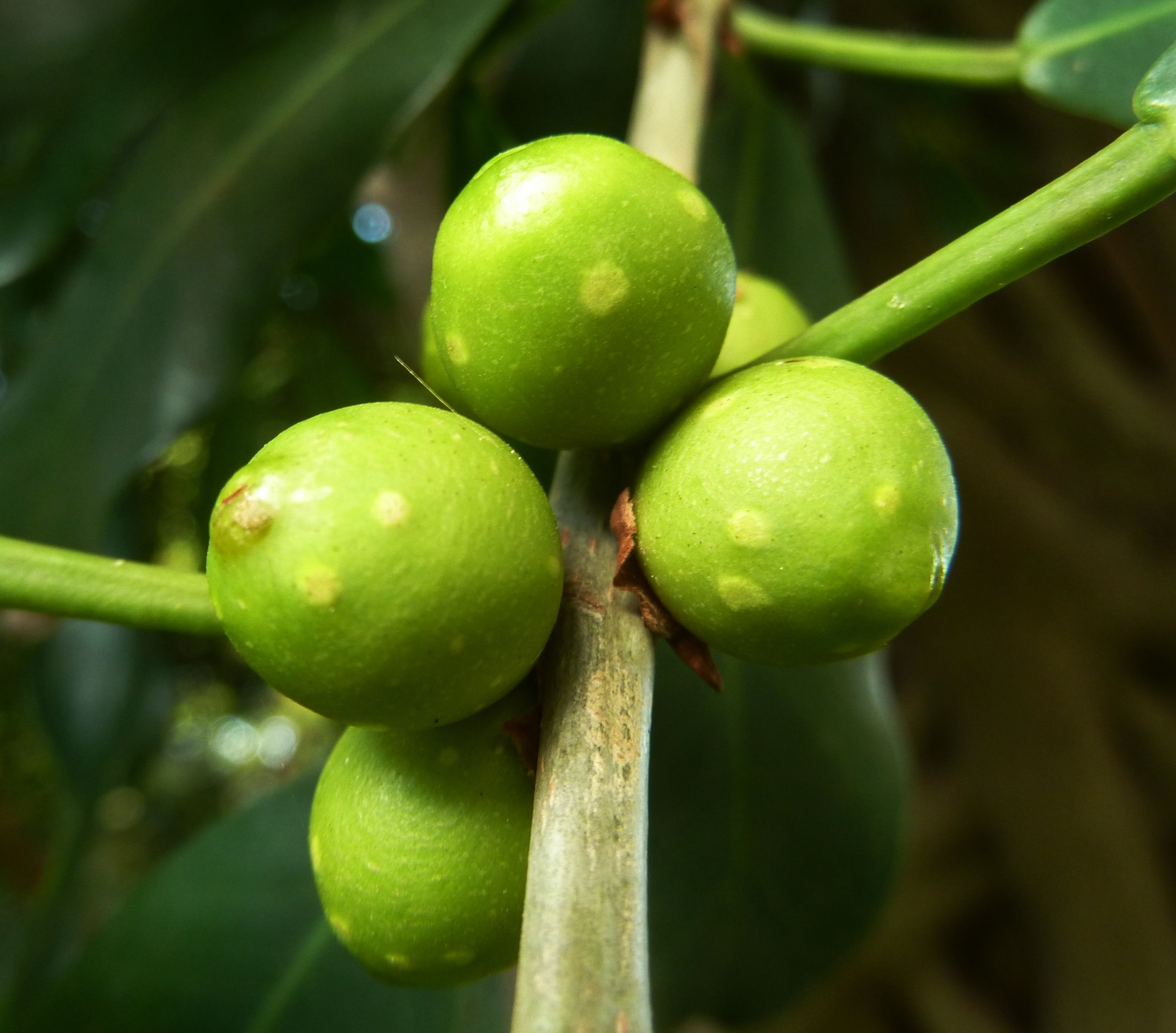
Sessile, axillary figs

Their dark, small leaves are obovate to blunt-tipped (reverse triangular) or even concave at the tip. The leaves of F. natalensis are similar, though more rounded and never concave at the tip.

== Figs ==
The small, stalkless figs grow in pairs in leaf axils. They measure from 0.5 to 1 cm in diameter and assume a yellowish red colour when ripe. Without the presence of the pollinating wasp, the figs will abort and are dropped in large numbers. The pollinating wasp of the western and eastern populations are Alfonsiella michaloudi and Alfonsiella pipithiensis respectively.
