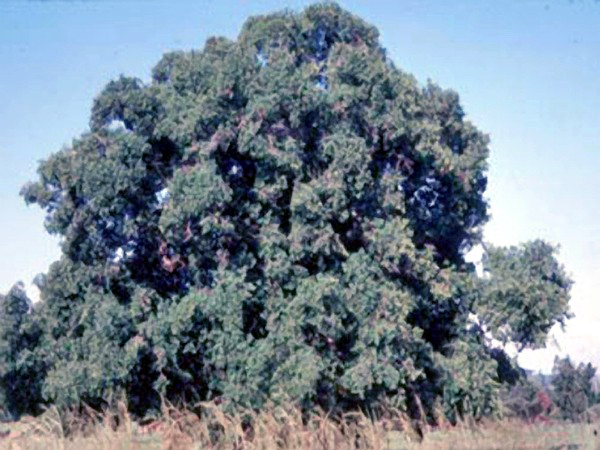

Conservation status
- Least Concern (IUCN 3.1)

Scientific classification
- Kingdom: Plantae
- Clade: Tracheophytes
- Clade: Angiosperms
- Clade: Eudicots
- Clade: Rosids
- Order: Rosales
- Family: Moraceae
- Genus: Ficus
- Species: F. thonningii

Binomial name
- Ficus thonningii Blume

Synonyms
- Synonymy: Ficus acrocarpa (Miq.) Steud. ex Miq.; Ficus acrocarpa var. ellipticifolia Miq.; Ficus acrocarpa var. saligna (Hochst.) Miq.; Ficus annobonensis Mildbr. & Hutch.; Ficus basarensis Warb. ex Mildbr. & Burret; Ficus bequaertii De Wild.; Ficus bongoensis Warb.; Ficus burkei (Miq.) Miq.; Ficus butaguensis De Wild.; Ficus chlamydodora Warb. ex Engl.; Ficus cognata N.E.Br.; Ficus crassipedicellata De Wild.; Ficus crassipedicellata f. angustifolia De Wild.; Ficus crassipedicellata f. boonei De Wild.; Ficus crassipedicellata var. cuneata De Wild.; Ficus cyphocarpa Mildbr.; Ficus dekdekena (Miq.) A.Rich.; Ficus dekdekena var. angustifolia Peter; Ficus dinteri Warb.; Ficus dissocarpa Hochst. ex A.Rich.; Ficus dusenii Warb.; Ficus erici-rosenii R.E.Fr.; Ficus eriocarpa Warb.; Ficus galpinii Warb.; Ficus goetzei Warb.; Ficus hochstetteri (Miq.) A.Rich.; Ficus hochstetteri var. glabior Miq.; Ficus iteophylla Miq.; Ficus kagerensis Lebrun & L.Touss.; Ficus mabifolia Warb.; Ficus mabifolia Warb.; Ficus mammigera R.E.Fr.; Ficus medullaris Warb.; Ficus microcarpa Vahl, nom. illeg. homonym. post.; Ficus neurocarpa Lebrun & L.Touss. (1948), non Hollick (1903), fossil name.; Ficus persicifolia Welw. ex Warb.; Ficus persicifolia var. angustifolia Warb.; Ficus persicifolia var. glabripes Warb.; Ficus petersii Warb.; Ficus phillipsii Burtt Davy & Hutch.; Ficus psilopoga Welw. ex Ficalho; Ficus pubicosta Warb. ex De Wild. & T.Durand; Ficus rhodesiaca Warb. ex Mildbr. & Burret; Ficus rokko Warb. & Schweinf; Ficus ruficeps Warb.; Ficus rupicola Lebrun & L.Touss.; Ficus saligna Hochst.; Ficus schimperi (Miq.) A.Rich.; Ficus schimperi var. hochstetteri (Miq.) Mildbr. & Burret; Ficus schinziana Warb.; Ficus spragueana Mildbr. & Burret; Ficus thonningii var. heterophylla Peter; Ficus tropophyton Lebrun & L.Touss.; Urostigma acrocarpum Miq.; Urostigma burkei Miq.; Urostigma dekdekena Miq.; Urostigma hochstetteri Miq.; Urostigma schimperi Miq.; Urostigma thonningii (Blume) Miq.

= Ficus thonningii =

Species of fig

Ficus thonningii is a species of Ficus. It is a tree native to tropical and southern Africa and the Cape Verde Islands. It is commonly known as Mũgumo to the Agikuyu or the Strangler Fig in common English. Recent phylogenetic analysis suggests it may be a species complex.

The species has diverse economic and environmental uses across many farming and pastoral communities in Africa. In some dryland areas in Africa for example, it is a very good source of dry season livestock fodder, because it produces highly nutritious foliage in large amounts all year round. Parts of the plant edible for livestock include, leaves, twigs and barks, and their nutritional value varies with season.

== Religious significance ==
Ficus thonningii is widely regarded as a holy tree among the Agikuyu and Mount Kenyan tribes. When praying for rain, an elder performs a sacrifice to Ngai (God) by fanning the smoke of a roasted, fattened lamb up the tree, inviting Ngai (God) to descend from above the clouds for the feast.

Ficus thonningii is often confused with its cousin Ficus natalensis, which tends to have leaves that are wider above the middle tapering to the bottom. Ficus natalensis is mainly found in Western Kenya and the coast as opposed to Ficus thonningii, which is common in the Mount Kenya region.

So revered is the Mũgumo tree in the Mount Kenya region that, in 2020, the President of Kenya issued a decree protecting a Ficus thonningii from being uprooted during the construction of the Nairobi Expressway. The particular tree was nicknamed the Waiyaki Way fig tree.
