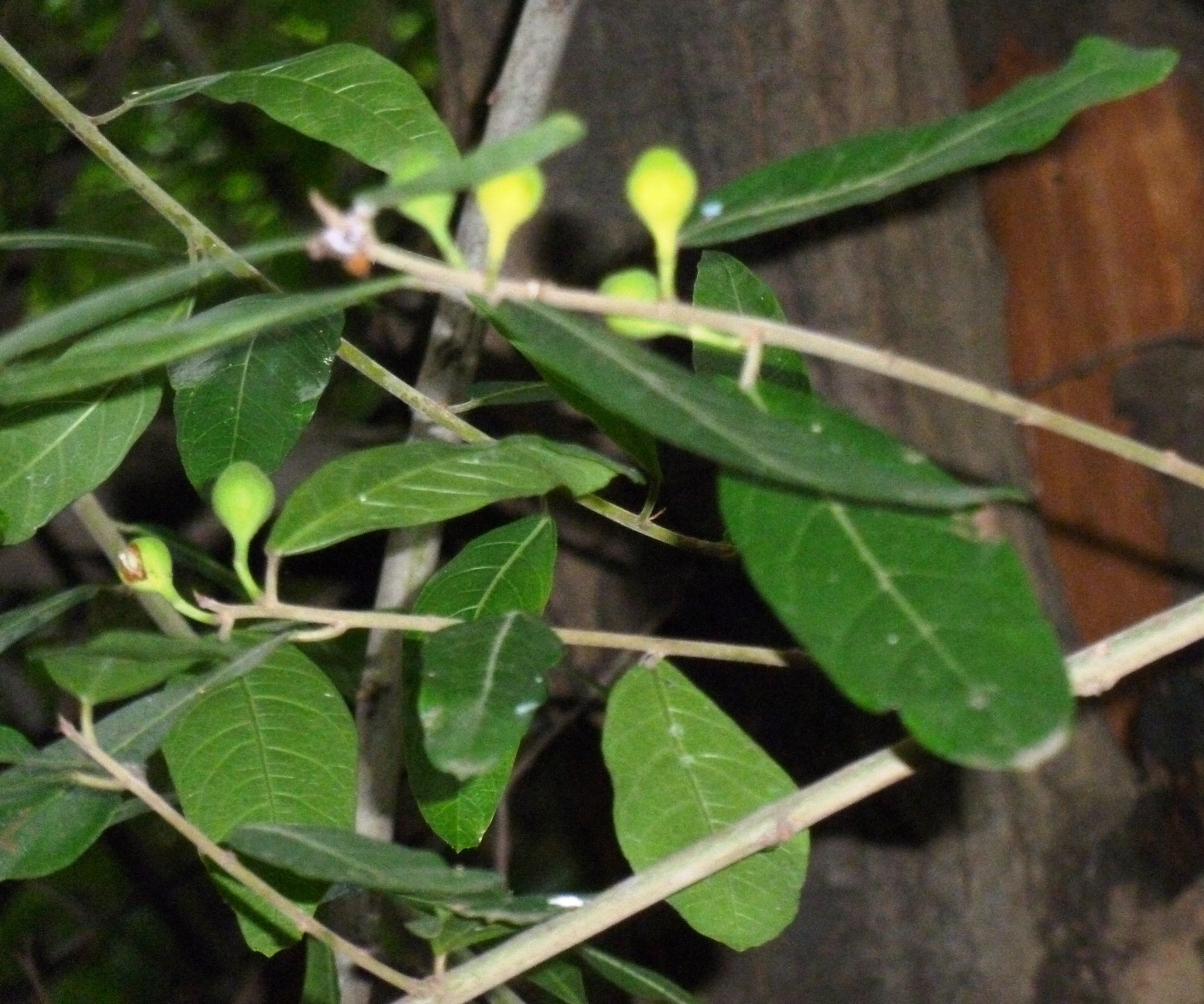
- In Pretoria, South Africa

Conservation status
- Least Concern (IUCN 3.1)

Scientific classification
- Kingdom: Plantae
- Clade: Tracheophytes
- Clade: Angiosperms
- Clade: Eudicots
- Clade: Rosids
- Order: Rosales
- Family: Moraceae
- Genus: Ficus
- Subgenus: F. subg. Sycidium
- Species: F. capreifolia

Binomial name
- Ficus capreifolia Delile

Synonyms
- Ficus antithetophylla Steud. ex Miq., nom. illeg. superfl.; Ficus capreifolia var. ovatifolia Hutch.; Ficus palustris Sim, nom. illeg. homonym. post.; Ficus paolii Pamp.; Sycomorus capreifolia (Delile) Walp.

= Ficus capreifolia =

River sandpaper fig

Species of fig

The river sandpaper fig (Ficus capreifolia) is a fig shrub or small tree of the western and eastern Afrotropics, from Senegal in the west to Somalia in the east and south to KwaZulu-Natal. It is typically found around pans or flood plains, or along riparian fringes in tropical or subtropical savanna regions, but is absent from the tropical rainforest zone. Despite its regular scrambling habit it may attain a height of 7 to 10 m (23 to 33 ft).

The bark is pale and smooth, and the branches are slender. Their rough-textured, pear-shaped, yellowish-green figs are up to 2 cm (0.79 in) in diameter and grow on short stalks from the leaf axils. The elongate leaves are rough on both surfaces.

== Gallery ==
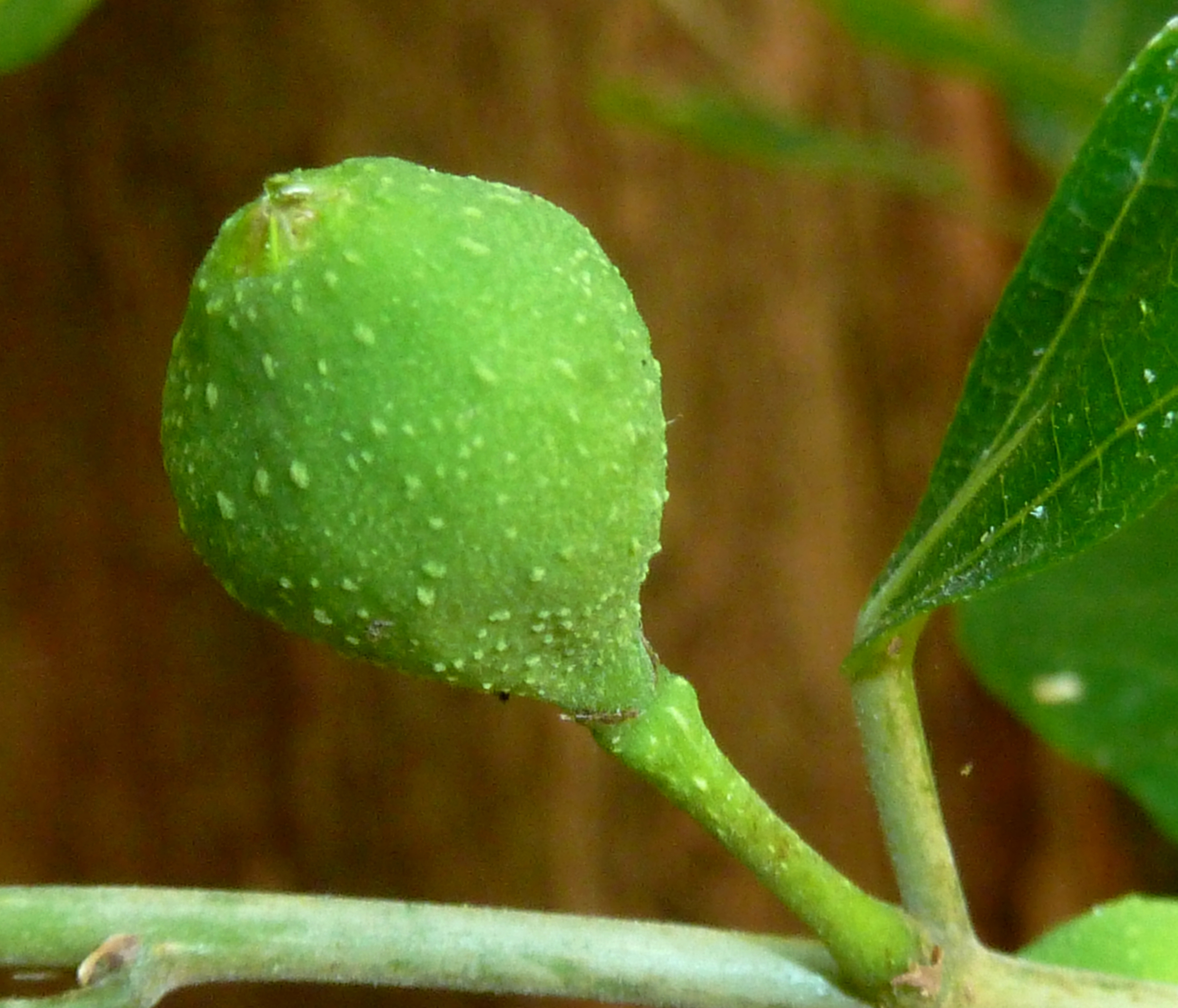
Fig in leaf axil

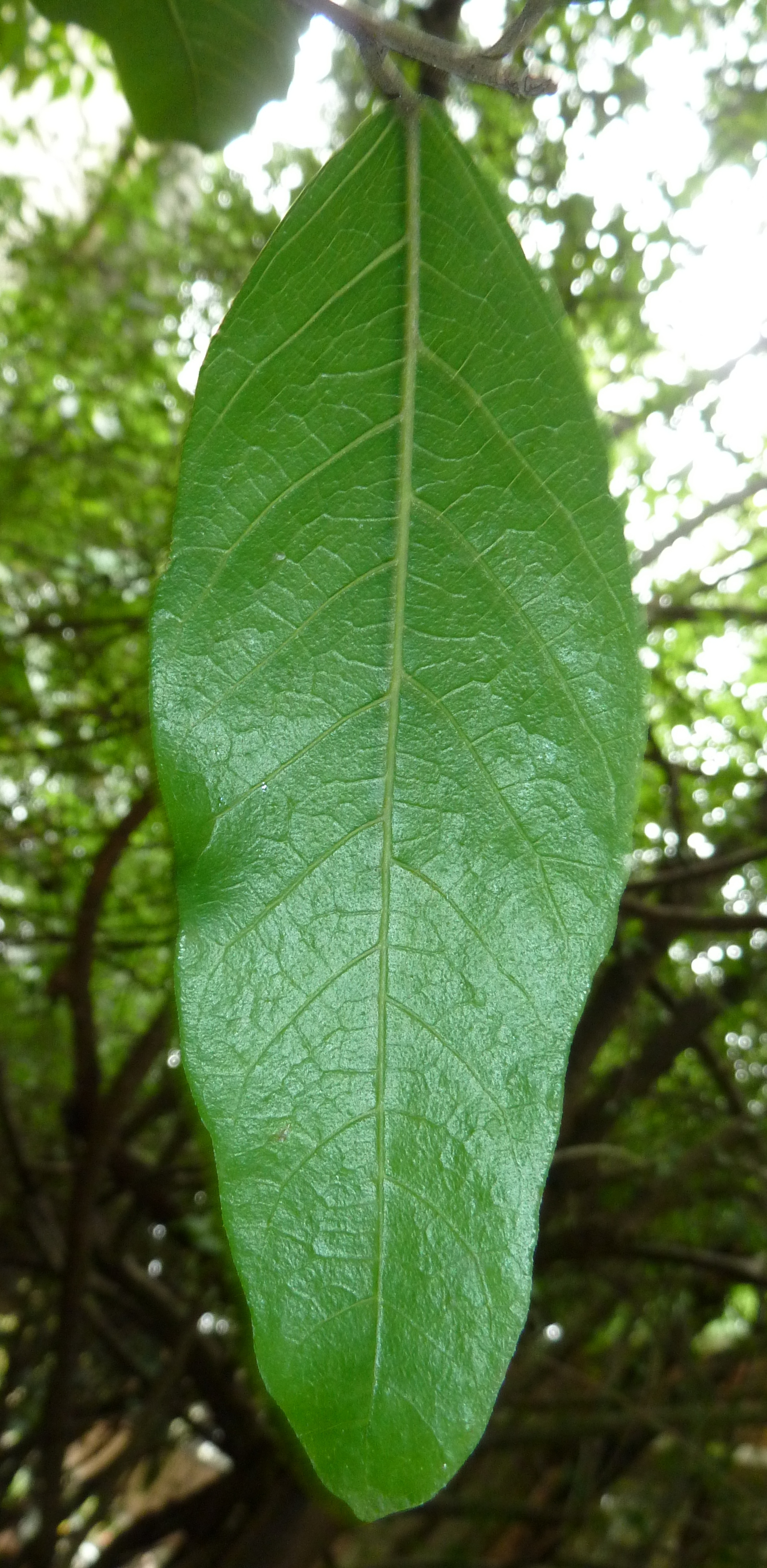
Leaf shape
