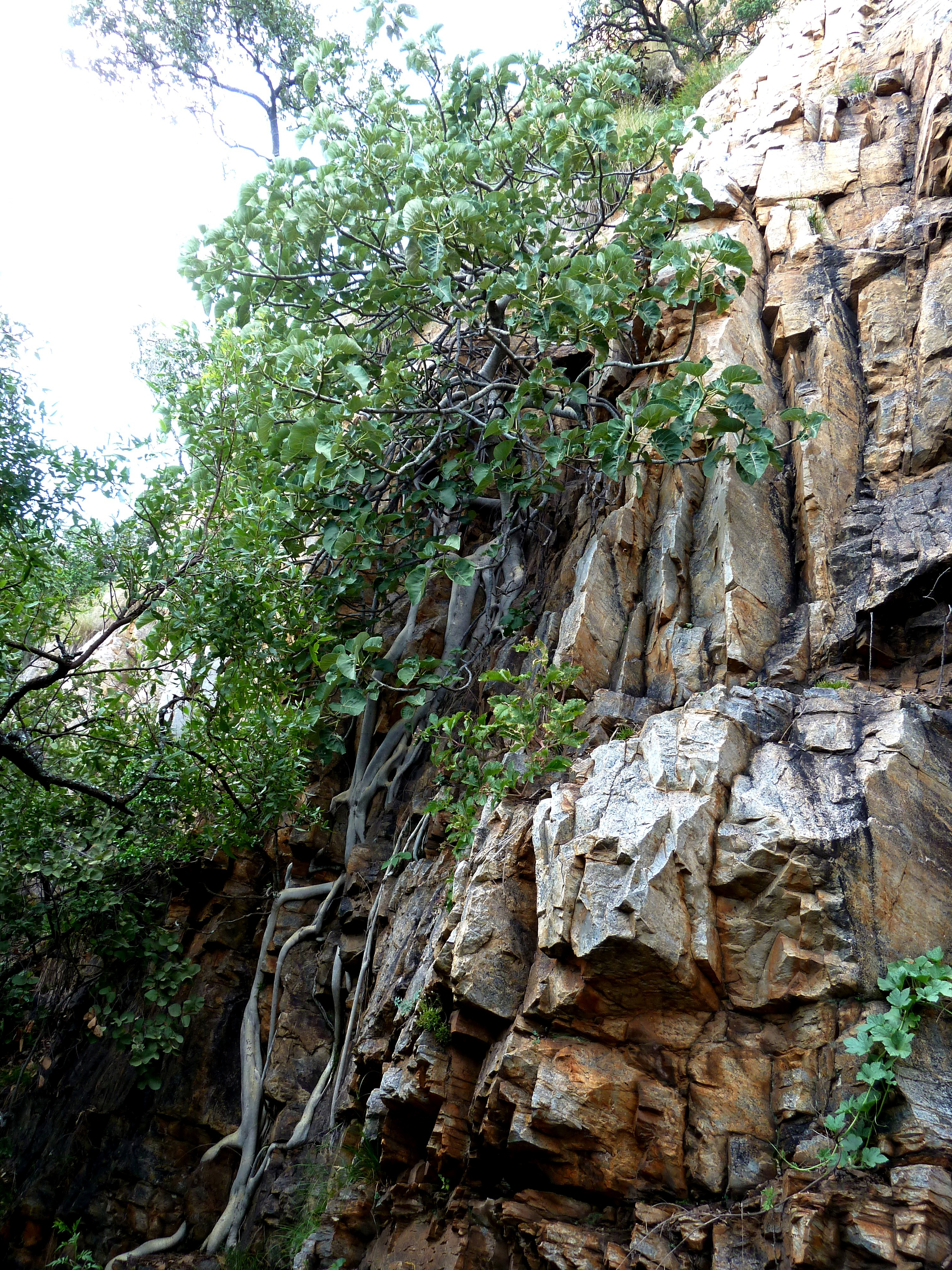
- In Walter Sisulu Botanical Garden

Conservation status
- Least Concern (IUCN 3.1)

Scientific classification
- Kingdom: Plantae
- Clade: Tracheophytes
- Clade: Angiosperms
- Clade: Eudicots
- Clade: Rosids
- Order: Rosales
- Family: Moraceae
- Genus: Ficus
- Subgenus: F. subg. Urostigma
- Species: F. abutilifolia

Binomial name
- Ficus abutilifolia (Miq.) Miq.

Synonyms
- Ficus discifera Warb.; Ficus kerstingii Hutch.; Ficus ledermannii Hutch.; Ficus mittuensis Warb.; Ficus picta Sim; Ficus soldanella Warb.; Urostigma abutilifolium Miq.

= Ficus abutilifolia =

Large-leaved rock fig

African fig species known as the large-leaved rock fig

Ficus abutilifolia, the large-leaved rock fig, is a species of African rock-splitting fig that occurs in two disjunct regions, one population north, and another south of the equator. The two populations are pollinated by different fig wasps, and are morphologically distinct. It is named for the similarity of its broadly ovate leaves to that of Abutilon. It is virtually restricted to cliff faces and rock outcrops, and is easily recognized from its large, glabrous leaves and smooth, pale bark.

== Species associations ==
Nigeriella fusciceps Wiebes is the pollinating wasp for the northern population, and Elisabethiella comptoni Wiebes pollinates the southern population. Philocaenus rotundus is an associated but non-pollinating wasp.

== Gallery ==
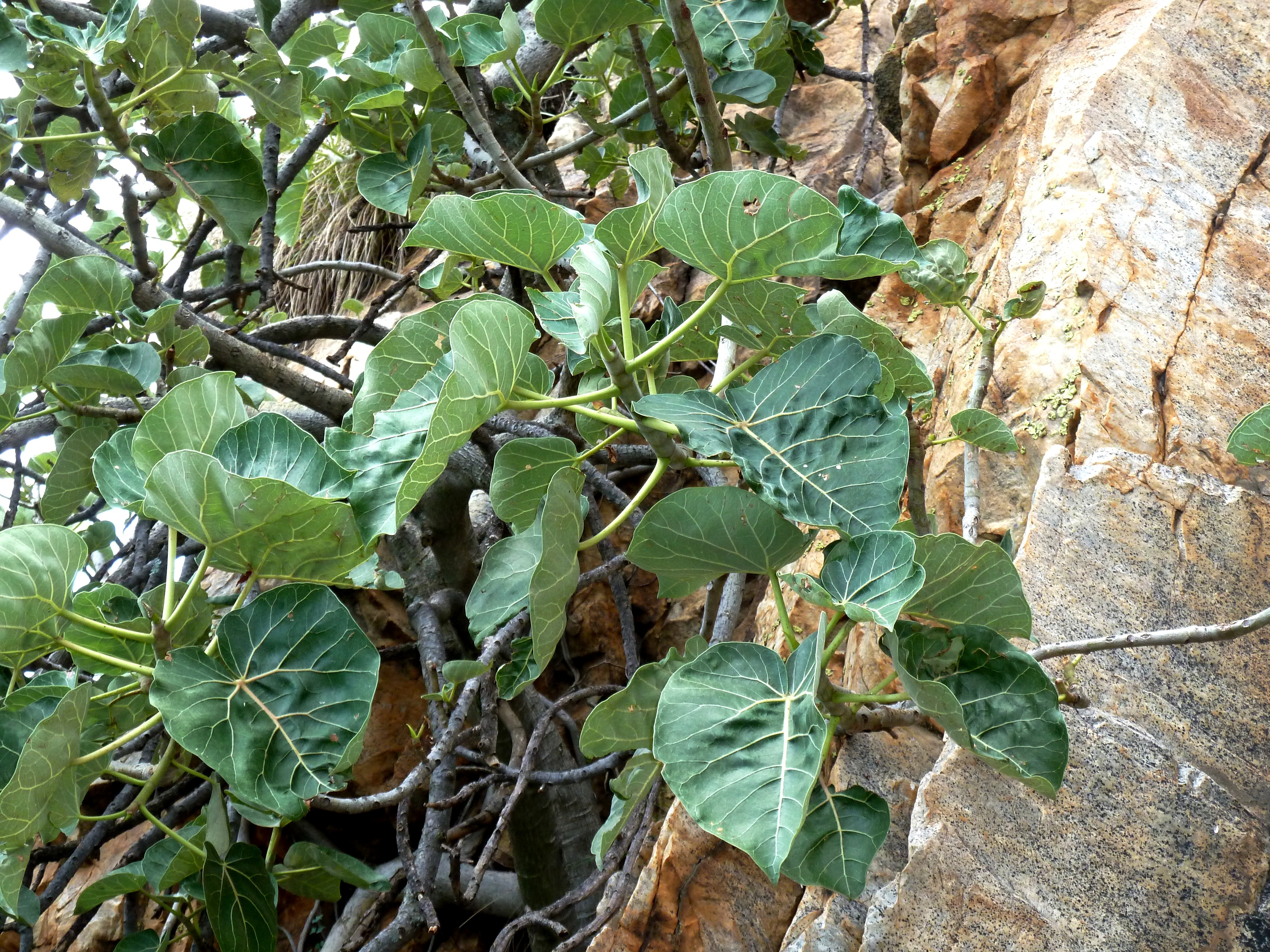
Foliage of a southern specimen

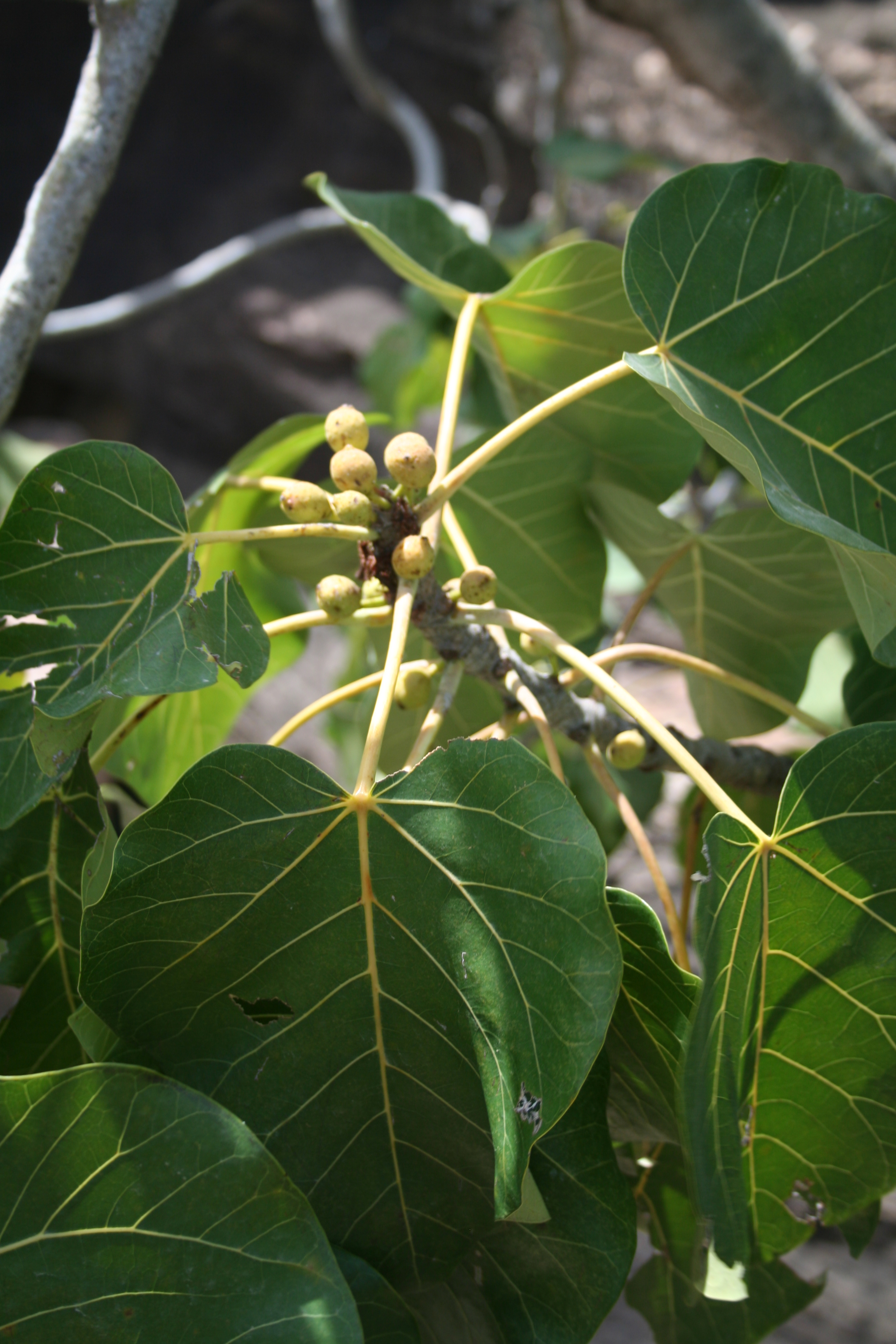
Foliage of a northern specimen

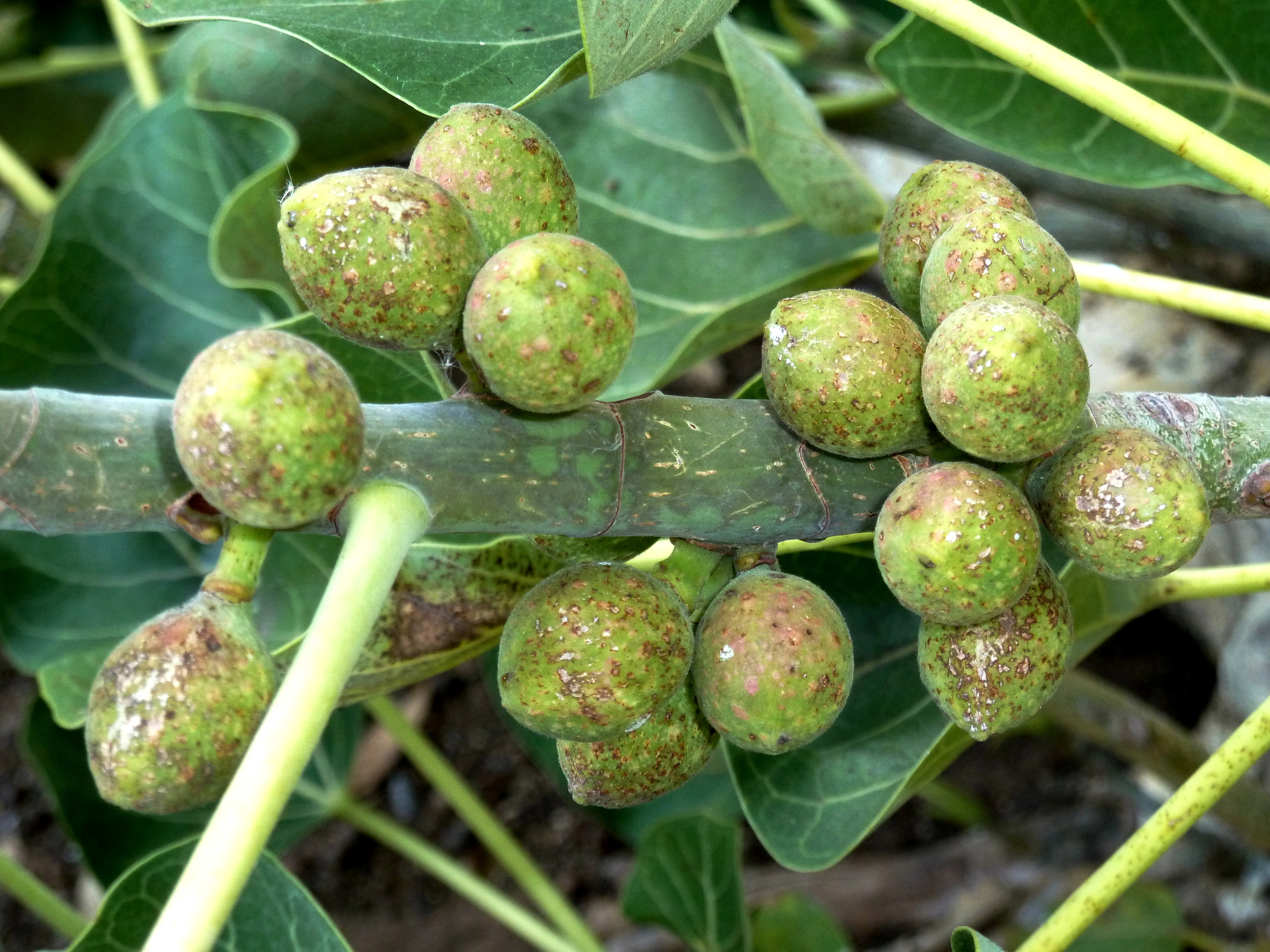
Fig arrangement

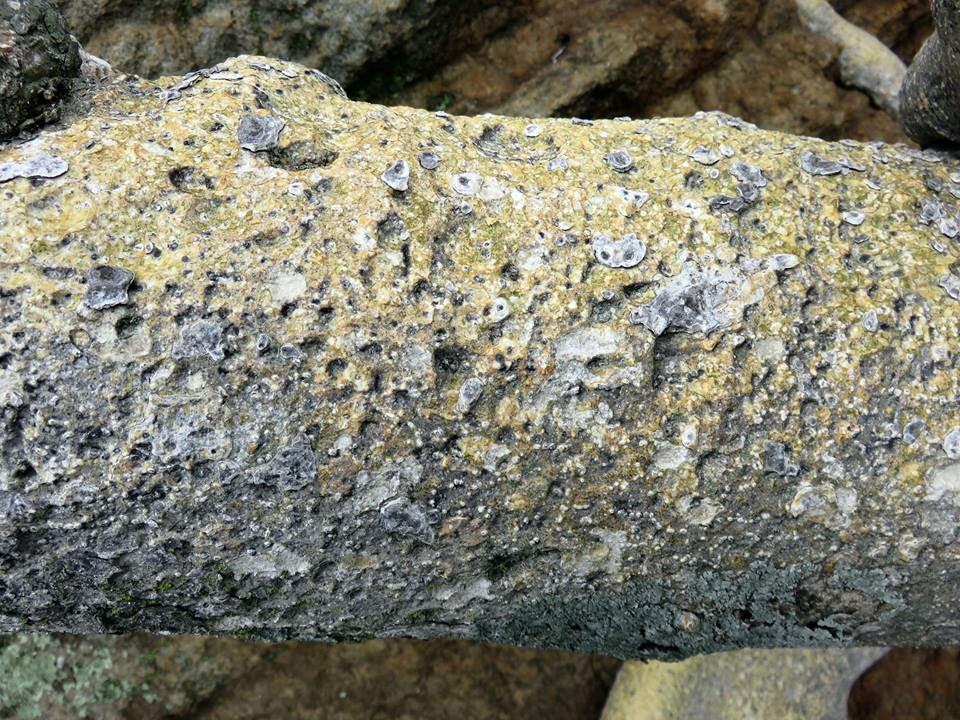
Bark texture

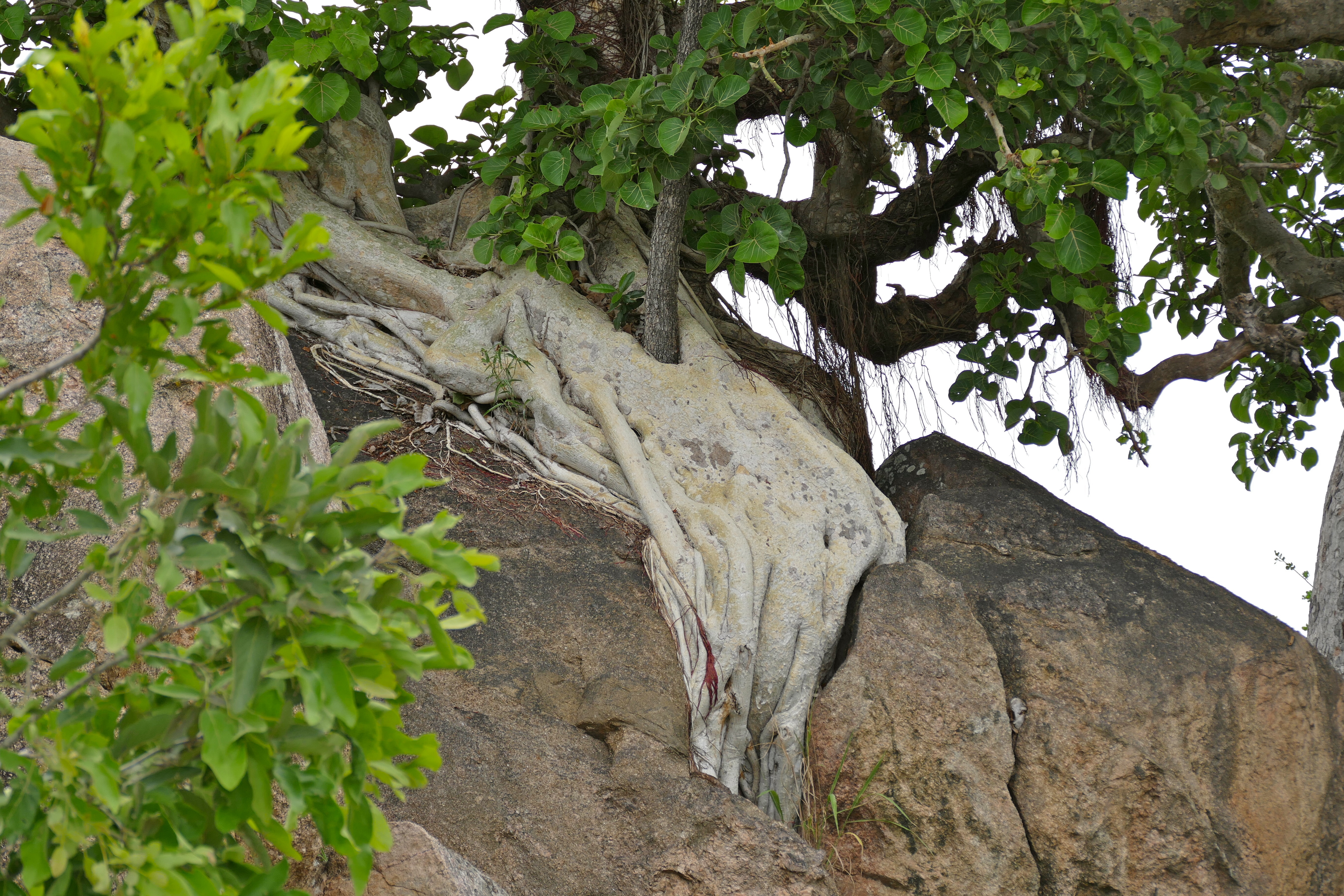
Roots on granite, Kruger National Park

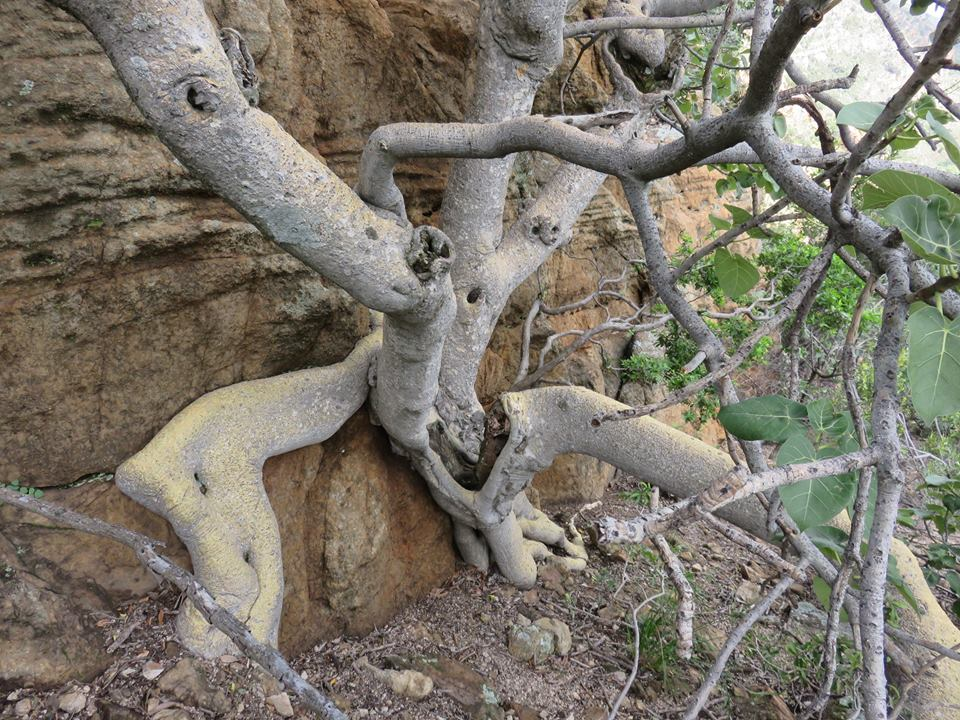
Branches and roots, Magaliesberg
