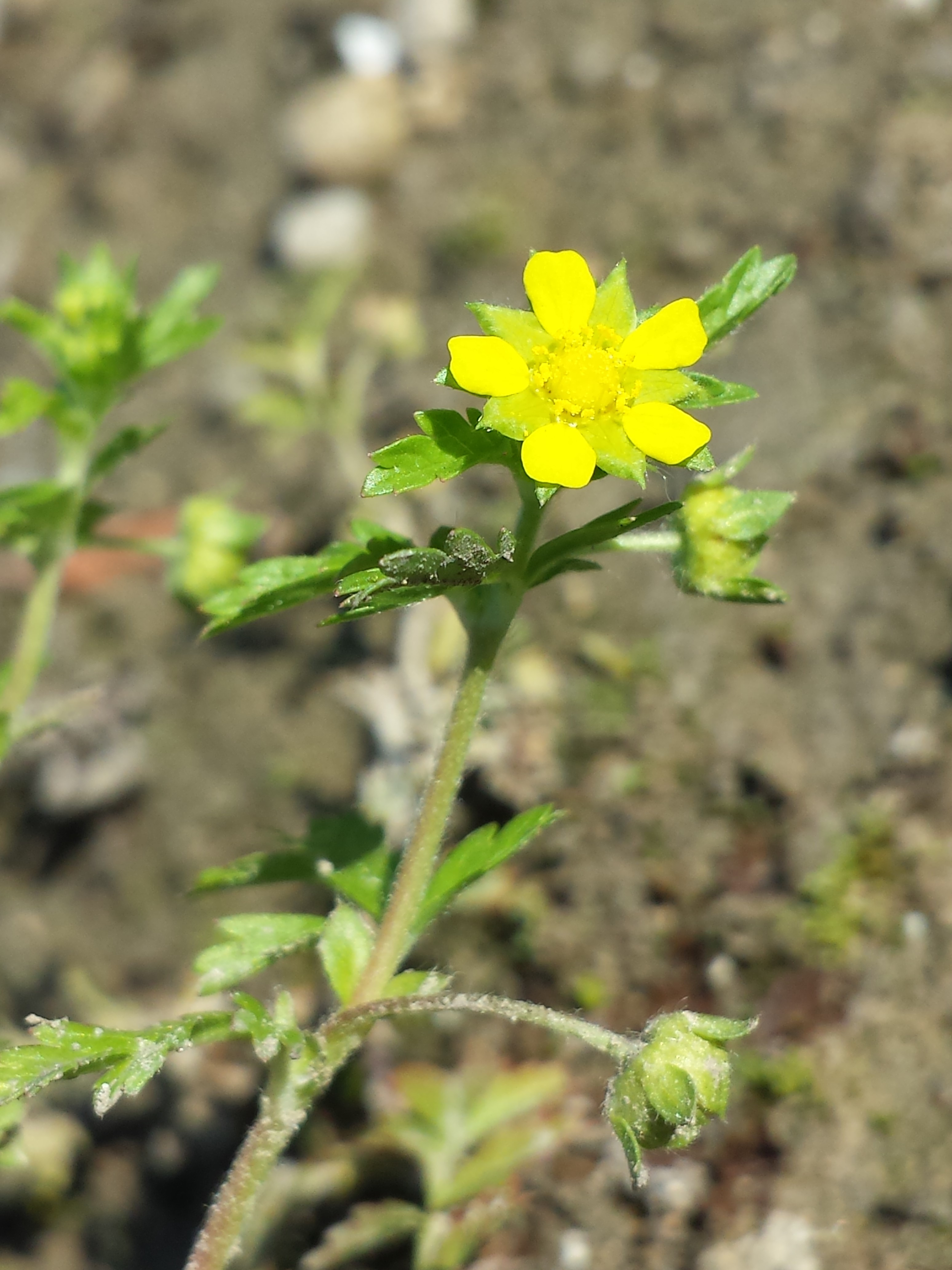

Conservation status
- Least Concern (IUCN 3.1)

Scientific classification
- Kingdom: Plantae
- Clade: Tracheophytes
- Clade: Angiosperms
- Clade: Eudicots
- Clade: Rosids
- Order: Rosales
- Family: Rosaceae
- Genus: Potentilla
- Species: P. supina

Binomial name
- Potentilla supina L.

= Potentilla supina =

Species of flowering plant

Potentilla supina is a species of flowering plant belonging to the family Rosaceae.

Its native range is the temperate and subtropical Northern Hemisphere and Southern Africa.
