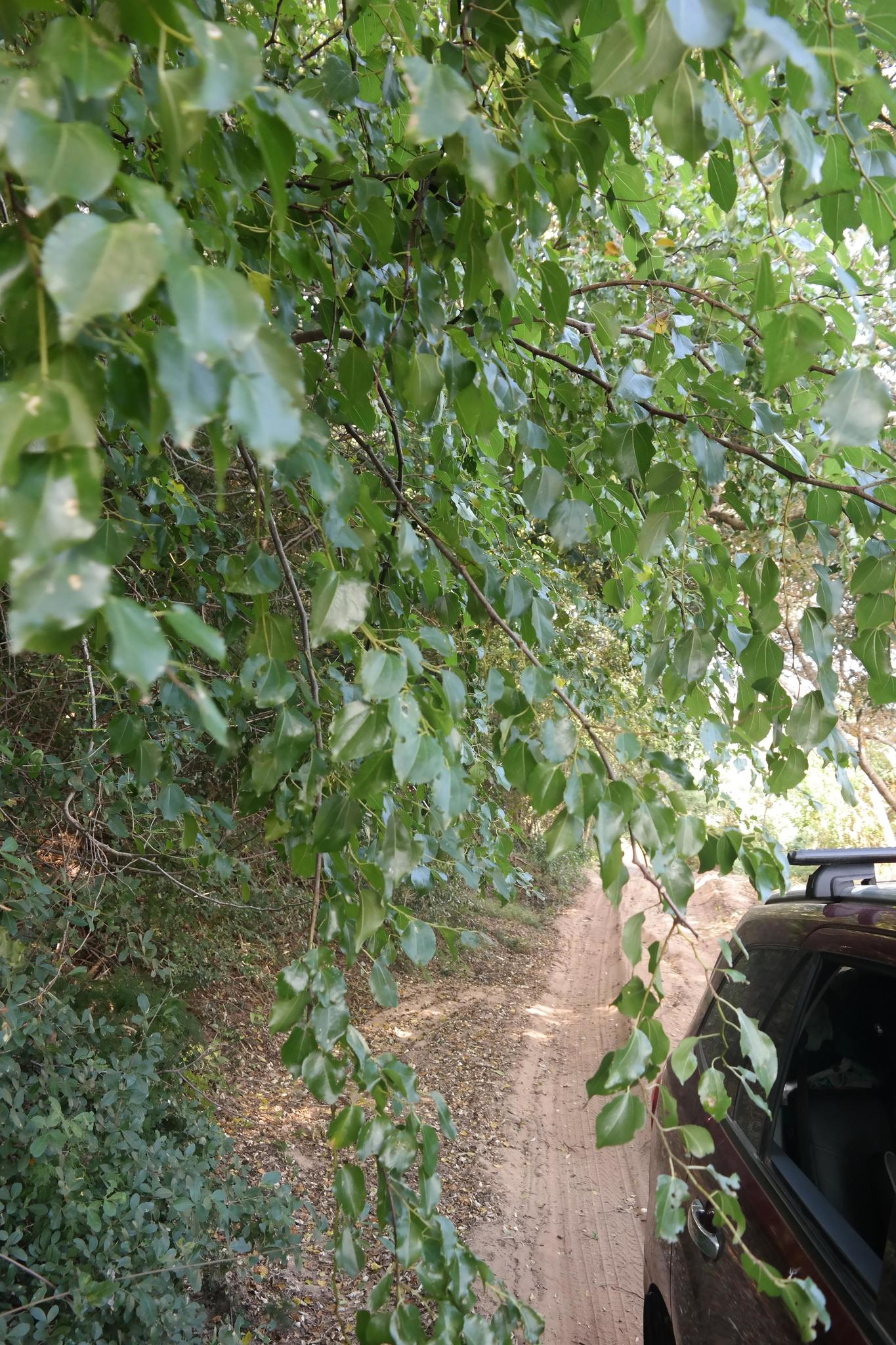

Conservation status
- Least Concern (IUCN 3.1)

Scientific classification
- Kingdom: Plantae
- Clade: Embryophytes
- Clade: Tracheophytes
- Clade: Angiosperms
- Clade: Eudicots
- Clade: Rosids
- Order: Rosales
- Family: Moraceae
- Genus: Afromorus; E.M.Gardner
- Species: A. mesozygia

Binomial name
- Afromorus mesozygia (Stapf) E.M.Gardner 2021

Synonyms
- Morus mesozygia Stapf 1909

= Afromorus =

Species of tree

Afromorus mesozygia, known as black mulberry or African mulberry, is the only species in the genus Afromorus. The plant is a small- to medium-sized forest tree of Tropical Africa. Known for its tasty black fruit, it is also a commercial hardwood, and its leaves provide utritious fodder for various animals.

== Description ==
Afromorus mesozygia is a dioecuous tree that can grow up to 35 m tall, the bark is smooth, greyish in color with irregular white patches. The slash is yellow exuding a white latex. Leaves are distichous, the stipules are caducous and up to 10 mm long. Surface of leaflets has a leathery or papery look, the leaflets are elliptical to broadly ovate in shape and tend to be between 3-13 cm long and 2-8 cm wide with a margin that is serrate to crenate. The apex is acuminate to acute and base is cordate.

The inflorescence is an axillary spike and the fruit is drupe like.

== Distribution and habitat ==
It occurs in Tropical Africa, from Senegal to Ethiopia in the north, and southwards to KwaZulu-Natal in South Africa. Its habitat are rainforests and deciduous forests.

== Ecology and uses ==
These trees are a food source for the common chimpanzee of West and Central Africa, e.g. in Ngogo in Kibale National Park in Uganda Leaves and fruit also provide food for the mantled guereza, a colobus monkey native to much of Tropical Africa.

African mulberry is sometimes cultivated as a shade tree or for ornamental purposes. Leaves and stem bark extracts are used in decoctions for pain management.

The fruit is eaten by various human communities in its range, many of which also use the foliage as fodder for livestock. Wood obtained from the species is used for carpentry work and also gathered for use as firewood.
