= Rubus pascuus =

Scientific classification
- Kingdom: Plantae
- Clade: Embryophytes
- Clade: Tracheophytes
- Clade: Spermatophytes
- Clade: Angiosperms
- Clade: Eudicots
- Clade: Rosids
- Order: Rosales
- Family: Rosaceae
- Genus: Rubus
- Species: R. pascuus

Binomial name
- Rubus pascuus L.H.Bailey

Synonyms
- Rubus serissimus L.H.Bailey; Rubus uliginosus Fernald

Species of fruit and plant

Rubus pascuus is an uncommon North American species of bramble.

== Description ==
The plant has coarse, woody canes, often 2–5 metres (6 1/2–16 1/2 feet) long and heavily armed with strong, flattened and sometimes recurved prickles. It is differentiated into first-year stems, usually without flowers or fruit (primocanes) and 2nd-year stems with flowers and fruit (floricanes). Strong, recurved prickles also arm the underside of the leaves and the stems of the flowering/fruiting area (raceme). The stems are canescent, being covered by short, fine, grayish hairs.

The leaves are mostly compound, and trifoliate, consisting of 3 leaflets. The central leaflet is on a short stalk (rachis), the side leaflets touching (sessile) the leaf stalk. The leaflets are generally oval (ovate-oblong), the tips slightly tapering to a small peak (acute), the margins with tiny, irregular teeth (coarsely double-serrate). The side leaflets on the primocane are occasionally slightly lobed. The underside of the leaves are very light/bright grayish with little hairs.

The flower petals are white to pale-pink. The fruits turn from green to red to dark purple or black as they ripen. The fruit breaks off with the tip of the stem inside (retaining the receptacle) like a typical blackberry, as opposed to a concave raspberry, which separates from the receptacle.

=== Similar species ===
The whitish underside of the leaves sets it apart from similar species with recurved prickles such as Rubus argutus.

== Taxonomy ==
The genetics of Rubus is extremely complex, so it is difficult to decide on which groups should be recognized as species. There are many rare species with limited ranges such as this. Further study is suggested to clarify the taxonomy.

== Distribution and habitat ==
The species grows only in the United States, primarily in the Ozarks of Missouri and Arkansas but with scattered populations farther east in New Jersey, Maryland, Virginia, and the Carolinas.

== Uses ==
The fruits are edible and taste like any other blackberry.
