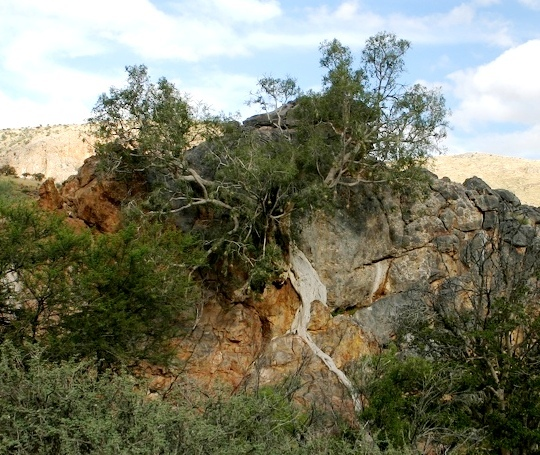
- In the Naukluft, Namibia

Conservation status
- Least Concern (IUCN 3.1)

Scientific classification
- Kingdom: Plantae
- Clade: Tracheophytes
- Clade: Angiosperms
- Clade: Eudicots
- Clade: Rosids
- Order: Rosales
- Family: Moraceae
- Genus: Ficus
- Subgenus: F. subg. Urostigma
- Species: F. ilicina

Binomial name
- Ficus ilicina (Sond.) Miq. (1864)

Synonyms
- Ficus guerichiana Engl.; Urostigma ilicinum Sond.

= Ficus ilicina =

Laurel fig

Species of tree

The Laurel fig (Ficus ilicina) is a species of rock-splitting fig that is native to the semi-desert regions of southwestern Africa in Angola, Namibia, and the Cape Provinces of South Africa. It is only found on rocks, up to an elevation of 1,300 m (4,300 ft).

== Description ==
It is generally a scrambler on rocks, but also a medium-sized shrub, or rarely a large tree of 5 m (16 ft) tall or more. It is mostly evergreen, though a few are bare in spring, just before new foliage emerges. The elliptic leaves are more than twice as long as they are wide, shiny above and matte below. The sessile or stalked figs are produced in the summer months. They are about 1 cm (0.39 in) in diameter and appear in the leaf axils near the branch tips.

== Range ==
It occurs in southwestern Angola, the Namibian escarpment and Khomas hochland, and in the Northern Cape, South Africa.

== Species associations ==
The pollinating wasp is Elisabethiella enriquesi (Grandi). The figs are eaten by birds and people.
