= Waiyaki Way fig tree =

Historic tree in Nairobi, Kenya

The Waiyaki Way fig tree located in Westlands in Nairobi, Kenya is noted for its cultural significance. Locally known as mugumo, the tree is described to be four-storeys tall and is believed to be at least a century old.

In October 2020, the Kenya National Highways Authority announced plans to transplant the tree to give way to the construction of the Nairobi Expressway, a four-lane highway funded by the government of China. This led to a campaign by environmentalists in a bid to keep the tree in its current location unscathed. Kenyan President Uhuru Kenyatta heeded the calls and issued a decree guaranteeing the protection of the tree. The tree will be adopted by the Nairobi Metropolitan Services and the highway project will be rerouted.

The fig tree is considered sacred by the Kikuyu. Mugumo trees, including the Waiyaki Way tree, are traditionally used as shrines or places of worship. Cutting down mugumo trees is taboo in Kikuyu culture. During droughts, prayers are often made at the base of the tree to encourage rain.

In May 2021, the iconic fig tree along Waiyaki Way, which was saved from being uprooted to clear the way for construction of Nairobi Expressway, began being used to hold government meetings and other public events.
