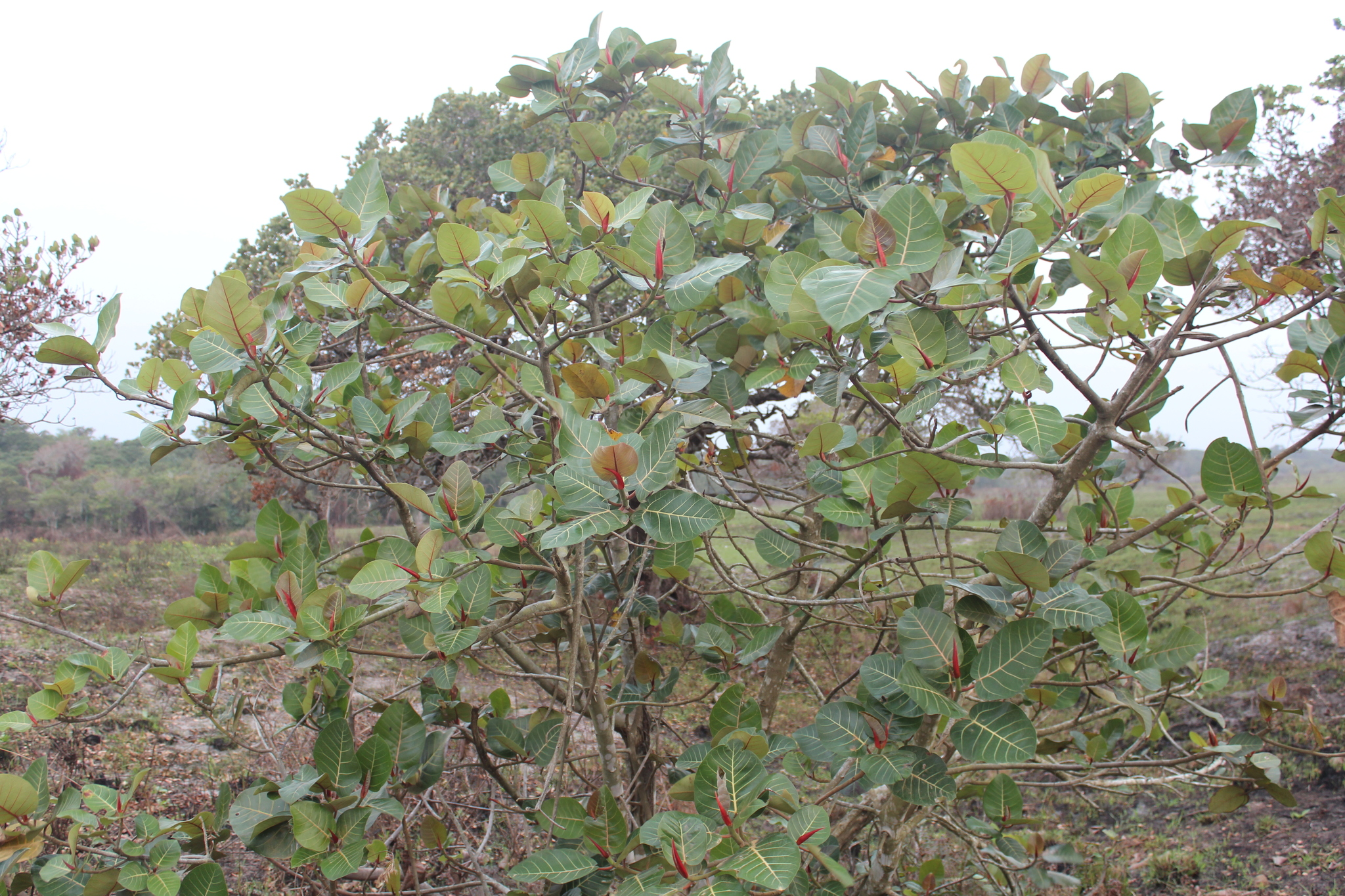

Conservation status
- Least Concern (IUCN 3.1)

Scientific classification
- Kingdom: Plantae
- Clade: Tracheophytes
- Clade: Angiosperms
- Clade: Eudicots
- Clade: Rosids
- Order: Rosales
- Family: Moraceae
- Genus: Ficus
- Species: F. trichopoda

Binomial name
- Ficus trichopoda Baker

Synonyms
- Ficus budduensis Hutch.; Ficus congensis Engl.; Ficus congensis var. mollis Hutch.; Ficus flavovenia Warb.; Ficus hippopotami Gerstner; Ficus zuvalensis Sim

= Ficus trichopoda =

Species of fig

Ficus trichopoda (swamp fig, Afrikaans: Moerasvy, Zulu: Umvubu) is species of flowering plant in the family Moraceae. It is a tree native to western, central, and southeastern tropical Africa, KwaZulu-Natal, and Madagascar. It is a protected tree in South Africa.

== See also ==
- List of Southern African indigenous trees
