= Ficus tremula =

Conservation status
- Least Concern (IUCN 3.1)

Scientific classification
- Kingdom: Plantae
- Clade: Tracheophytes
- Clade: Angiosperms
- Clade: Eudicots
- Clade: Rosids
- Order: Rosales
- Family: Moraceae
- Genus: Ficus
- Species: F. tremula

Binomial name
- Ficus tremula Warb.

Subspecies
- Ficus tremula subsp. acuta (De Wild.) C.C.Berg; Ficus tremula subsp. kimuenzensis (Warb.) C.C.Berg; Ficus tremula subsp. tremula

Synonyms
- synonyms of subsp. acuta: Ficus acuta De Wild.; synonyms of subsp. kimuenzensis: Ficus kimuenzensis Warb.; Ficus rudens Hutch.; synonyms of subsp. tremula: Ficus pulvinata Warb.

Species of flowering plant

Ficus tremula is an hemi-epiphytic species within the family Moraceae. It is pollinated by the fig wasp, Courtella wardi.

== Subspecies ==
Ficus tremula has three subspecies:

- Ficus tremula subsp. acuta (De Wild.) C.C.Berg – southwestern Kenya, Uganda, Burundi, Rwanda, and Democratic Republic of the Congo. The IUCN Red List assesses the subspecies as Vulnerable.
- Ficus tremula subsp. kimuenzensis (Warb.) C.C.Berg – southeastern Nigeria through Cameroon, Gabon, and Democratic Republic of the Congo to Angola.
- Ficus tremula subsp. tremula – Eastern Africa from southwestern Kenya through Tanzania, Mozambique, Zimbabwe, and Eswatini to KwaZulu-Natal. The IUCN Red List assesses the species as Least Concern.

== Description ==
Ficus tremula is hemi-epiphytic shrub or tree that can reach 10 metres (33 ft) tall with leafy and greyish stems. Leaves are arranged spirally, the length of the petiole ranges from 0.7–4.5 centimetres (0.3–1.8 in) while the stipule's range is 2–10 millimetres (0.08–0.39 in). Leaflets are oblong to elliptical in shape, about 2–11 centimetres (0.8–4.3 in) long and 1–5 centimetres (0.4–2.0 in) wide with a margin that is entire. The leaf texture is letherly to papery with a rounded or cordate base and a subacute to acuminate apex.

Its figs are borne in fascicles, are elliptic to globular in shape and yellowish to green in color when ripe, they can reach up to 2 centimetres (0.8 in) in diameter.

== Distribution and habitat ==
Occurs in Central and Eastern Africa and also in Nigeria and in the KwaZulu-Natal Province of South Africa. Found in upland and lowland in rain forest and savannah environments.

== Uses ==
In parts of Kenya, fish traps are made from strings produced from fibres obtained from the stem bark of the tree.
