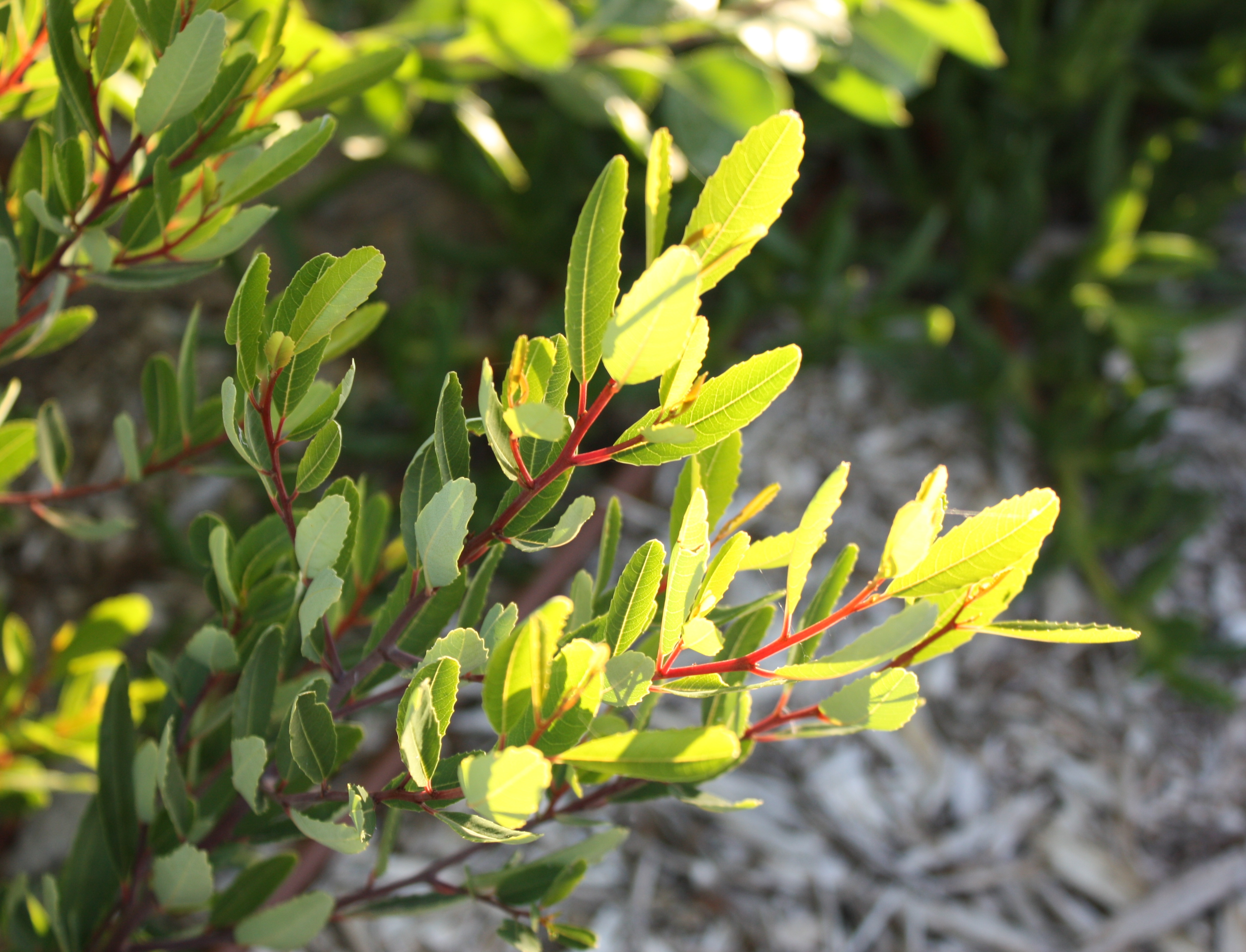
- Detail of foliage of the Soap Bush

Conservation status
- Least Concern (IUCN 3.1)

Scientific classification
- Kingdom: Plantae
- Clade: Tracheophytes
- Clade: Angiosperms
- Clade: Eudicots
- Clade: Rosids
- Order: Rosales
- Family: Rhamnaceae
- Tribe: Phyliceae
- Genus: Noltea; Rchb.
- Species: N. africana

Binomial name
- Noltea africana (L.) Endl.

Synonyms
- Hollia Heynh.; Willemetia Brongn., nom. illeg. homonym. post.; Vitmannia Wight & Arn., nom. illeg. homonym. post.; Ceanothus africanus L.; Ceanothus atropurpureus Raf.; Ceanothus elongatus Salisb.; Ceanothus lancifolius Moench; Ceanothus scandens D.Dietr.; Hollia africana Heynh.; Rhamnus africana Mill.; Willemetia africana (L.) Brongn.; Vitmannia africana (L.) Wight & Arn.

= Noltea =

Genus of trees

Noltea is a monotypic genus of flowering plants. The single species, Noltea africana (commonly known as the soap bush or soap dogwood), is a small, bushy tree of about 4 metres that is endemic to the southern Cape of South Africa, where it grows beside rivers and in pockets of afro-montane forest. It has small, white, mildly fragrant flowers and when it grows larger it assumes a willow shape, with slightly weeping branches. The leaves are long and serrated and the young growth is purple in colour.

The foliage of the "soap bush" can be used to produce a soapy lather for cleaning, and this tree also conveniently tends to grow near lakes and rivers.
