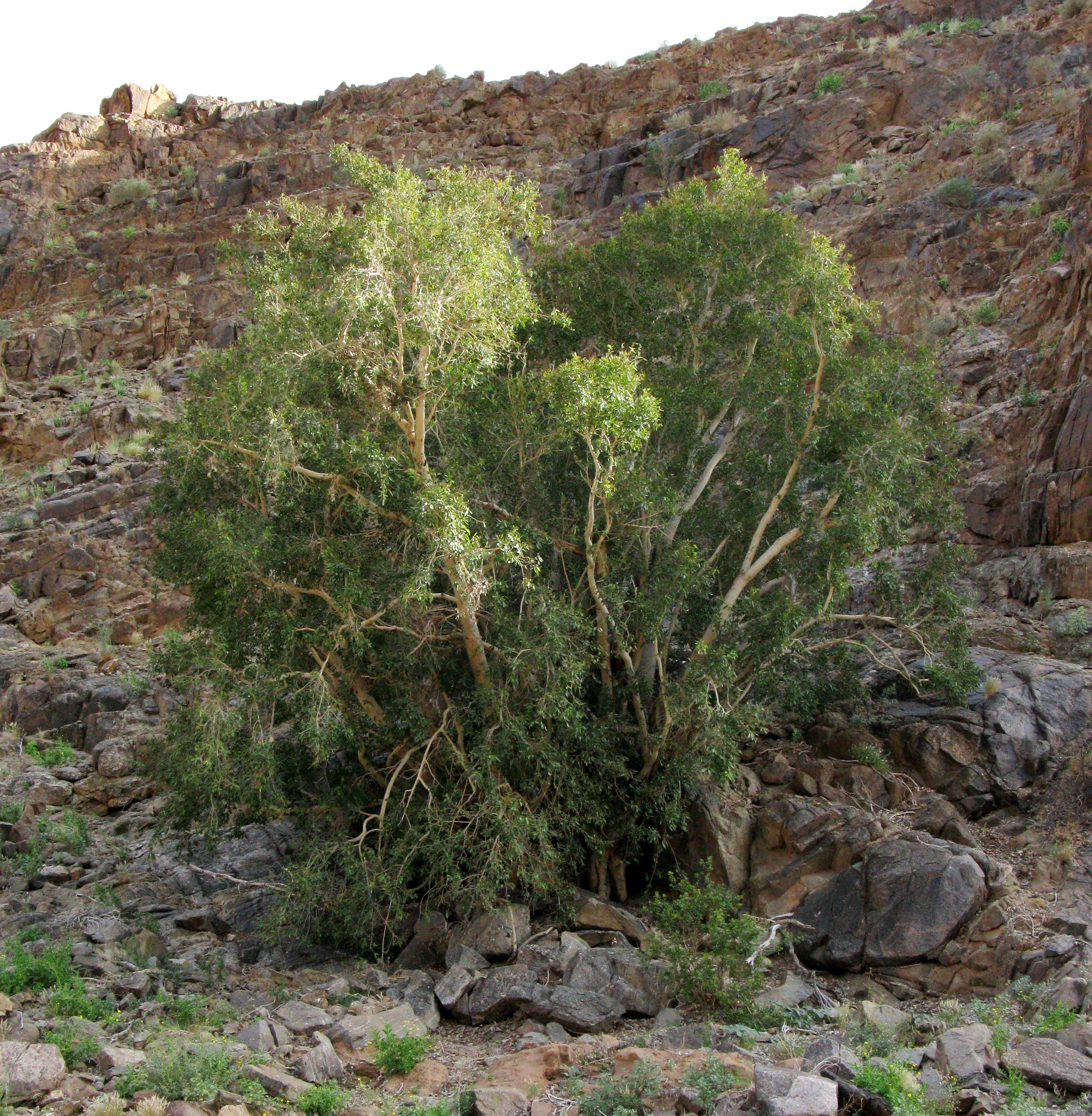
- In the Fish River Canyon, Namibia

Conservation status
- Least Concern (IUCN 3.1)

Scientific classification
- Kingdom: Plantae
- Clade: Tracheophytes
- Clade: Angiosperms
- Clade: Eudicots
- Clade: Rosids
- Order: Rosales
- Family: Moraceae
- Genus: Ficus
- Subgenus: F. subg. Urostigma
- Species: F. cordata

Binomial name
- Ficus cordata Thunb.

Synonyms
- Ficus atrovirens Kunth & C.D.Bouché; Ficus cordata var. fleckii Warb.; Ficus cordata var. marlothii Warb.; Ficus cordata var. tristis (Kunth & C.D.Bouché) Warb.; Ficus glaucophylla Desf.; Ficus rupium Dinter; Ficus tristis Kunth & C.D.Bouché; Ficus welwitschii Warb.; Ficus welwitschii var. beroensis Hiern; Urostigma atrovirens Regel; Urostigma cordatum (Thunb.) Gasp.; Urostigma glaucophyllum Gasp.; Urostigma thunbergii Miq., nom. illeg. superfl.

= Ficus cordata =

Namaqua rock fig

Species of plant

Ficus cordata, the Namaqua rock fig or Namaqua fig, is a species of fig native to southwestern and west-central Africa. In the south it is often the largest and most prominent tree, and is virtually restricted to cliff faces and rock outcrops, where it has a rock-splitting habit.

== Taxonomy ==
The species was first described by Carl Peter Thunberg in 1786. Two subspecies were formerly recognized:

- F. c. cordata – southwestern Africa
- F. c. lecardii (Warb.) C.C.Berg – Senegal to central Africa

Subspecies lecardii is now recognized as a distinct species, Ficus lecardii.

== Range and habitat ==
Ficus cordata is native to arid western South Africa, Namibia, southwestern Angola, Botswana, and Cameroon. It is found in fynbos, succulent Karoo, and Nama Karoo.

== Species associations ==
The species is pollinated by the wasp Platyscapa desertorum Compton. The wasp Comptoniella vannoorti Wiebes is an associated non-pollinator that oviposits through the fig wall.

== Similar species ==
F. salicifolia, the Wonderboom, is sometimes deemed a third subspecies of Ficus cordata, i.e. F. c. subsp. salicifolia (Vahl) C.C.Berg, but it lacks the yellowish sessile figs of F. cordata, and its range is much to the east.

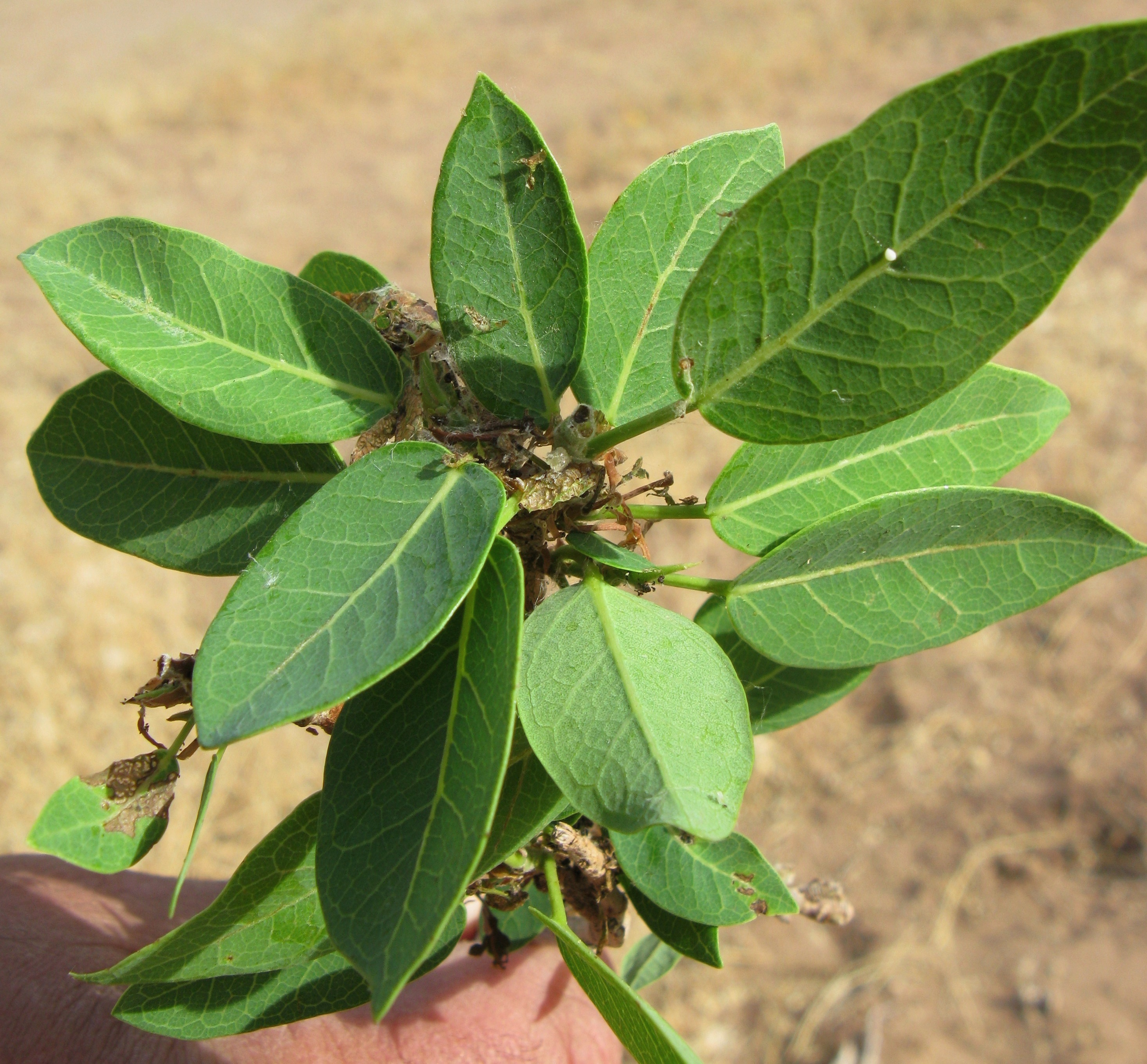
Foliage
