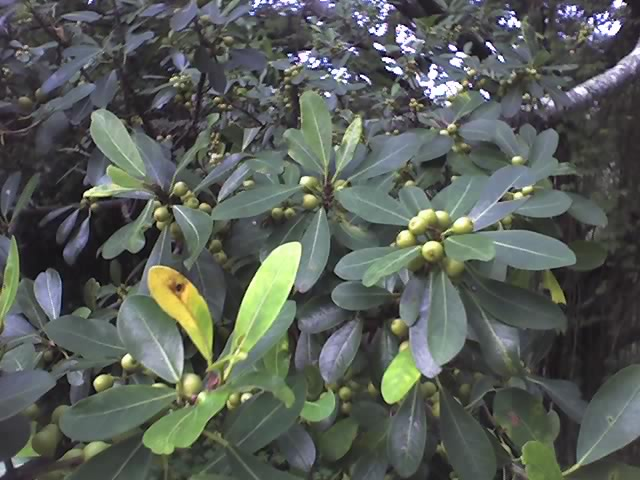
- figs and foliage
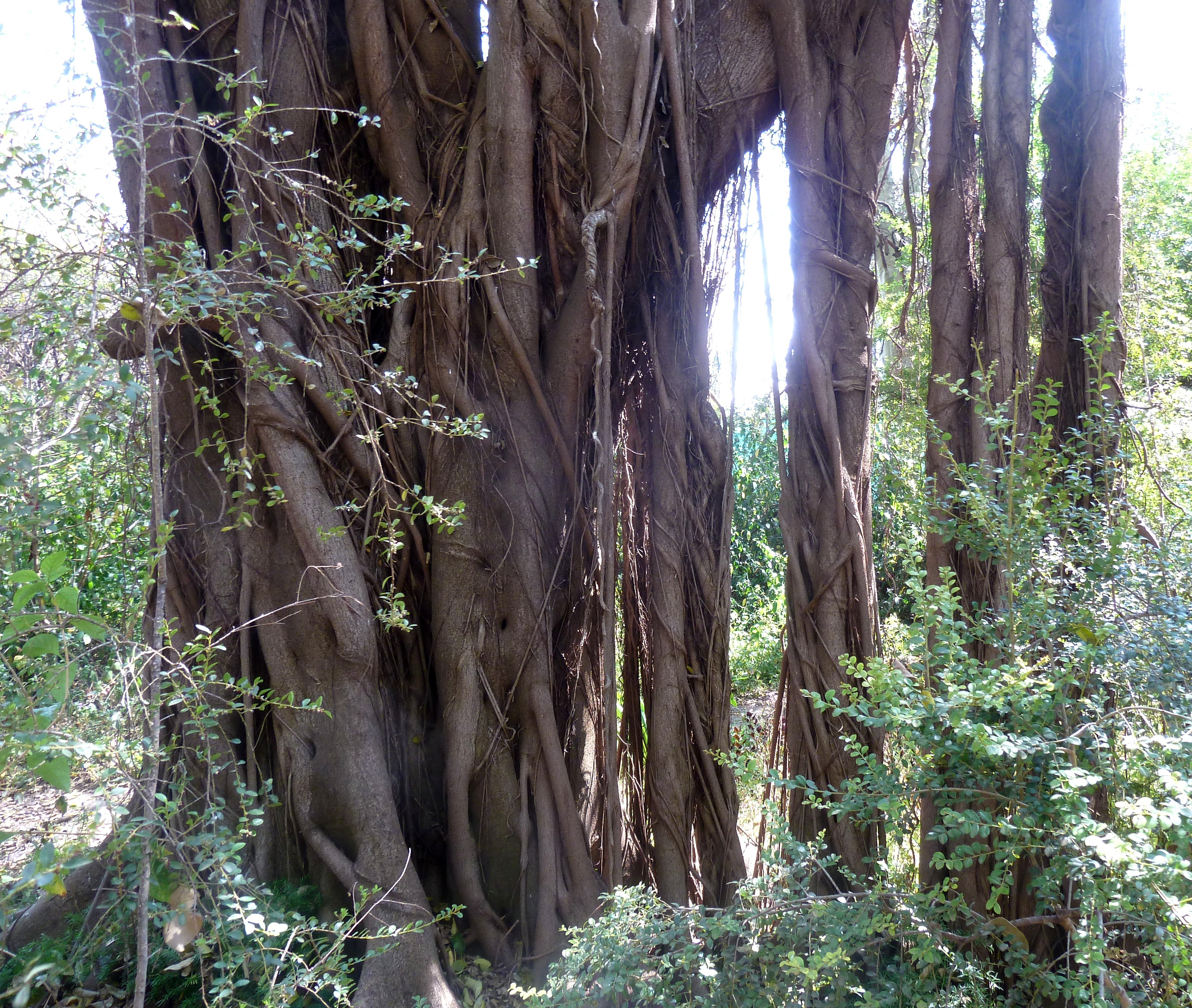
- aerial roots

Conservation status
- Least Concern (IUCN 3.1)

Scientific classification
- Kingdom: Plantae
- Clade: Tracheophytes
- Clade: Angiosperms
- Clade: Eudicots
- Clade: Rosids
- Order: Rosales
- Family: Moraceae
- Genus: Ficus
- Species: F. natalensis

Binomial name
- Ficus natalensis Hochst.

= Ficus natalensis =

Natal fig

Species of fig

Ficus natalensis is a tree in the family Moraceae. It is commonly known as the natal fig in South Africa. In central and western Uganda, where it has an important cultural value, it is known as omutuba to the Baganda people and omutoma to the Banyakitara peoples. In English is sometimes referred as barkcloth fig. It is commonly mistaken for its cousin the Ficus thonningii also known as mugumo to the Agikuyu. These trees are distributed from north-eastern South Africa to Uganda and Kenya.

It is a popular species to cultivate as bonsai due to its fast growth and hardy nature.

The bark of the tree is harvested, without harming the tree, to make barkcloth. Artisans incorporate this fabric into many modern uses, including fashion, accessories, housewares, interior design, and art. The bark of F. natalensis has exhibited potent antimicrobial activity against methicillin resistant Staphylococcus aureus (MRSA) in vitro.

Mutuba trees can be harvested annually for up to 40 years, yielding up to 200 m^{2} of cloth individually.
