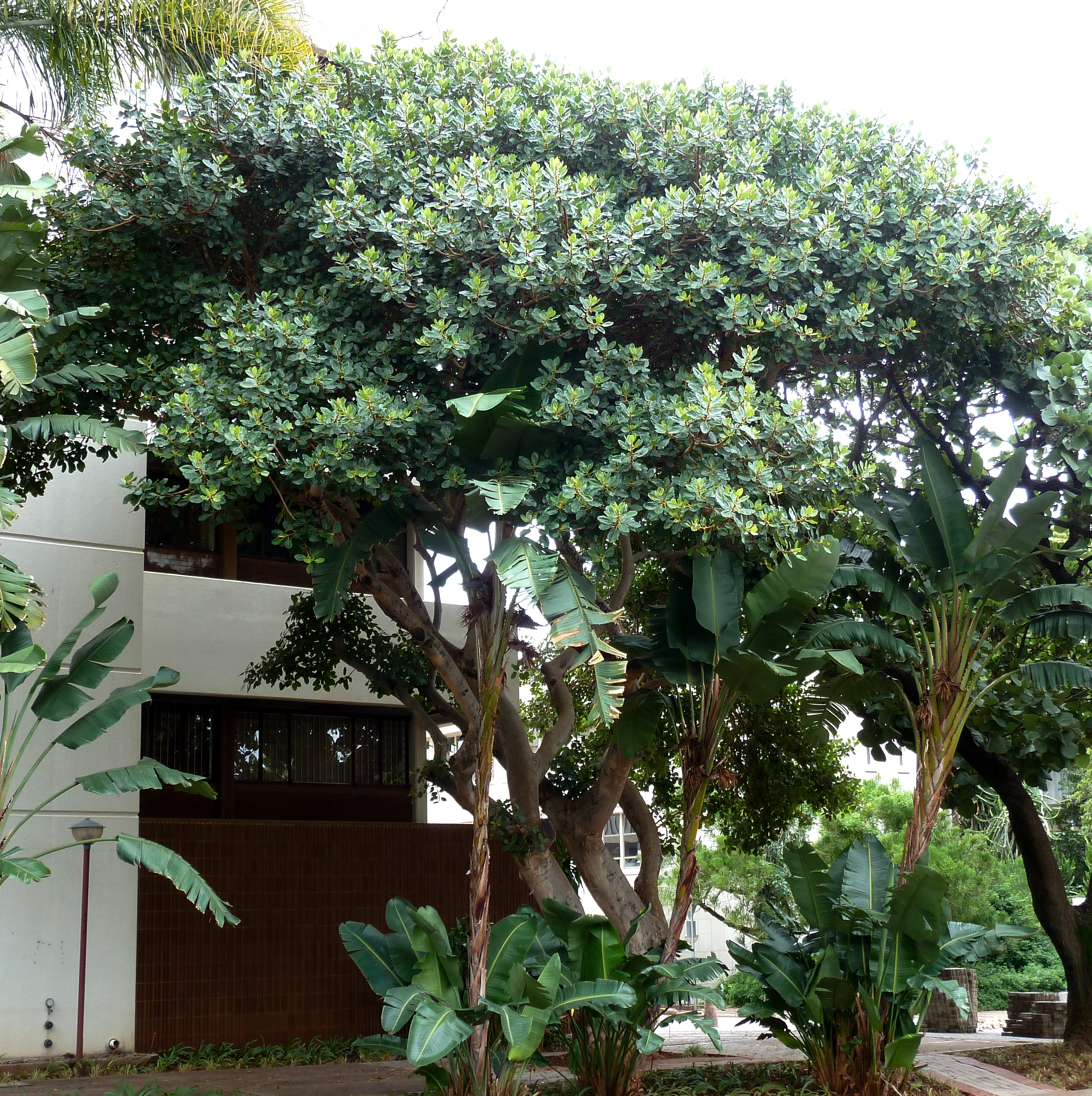
- In Pretoria, South Africa

Conservation status
- Least Concern (IUCN 3.1)

Scientific classification
- Kingdom: Plantae
- Clade: Tracheophytes
- Clade: Angiosperms
- Clade: Eudicots
- Clade: Rosids
- Order: Rosales
- Family: Moraceae
- Genus: Ficus
- Subgenus: F. subg. Urostigma
- Species: F. glumosa

Binomial name
- Ficus glumosa Delile

Synonyms
- Ficus barbata Warb.; Ficus durandiana Warb.; Ficus fazokelensis (Miq.) Miq.; Ficus glumosa var. glaberrima Martelli; Ficus glumosa var. intermedia Martelli; Ficus glumosa var. lanuginosa Martelli; Ficus glumosoides Hutch.; Ficus gombariensis De Wild.; Ficus kitaba De Wild.; Ficus montana Sim; Ficus rehmannii Warb.; Ficus rehmannii var. ovatifolia Warb.; Ficus rehmannii var. villosa Warb.; Ficus rubicunda (Miq.) Miq.; Ficus rukwaensis Warb.; Ficus sonderi Miq.; Sycomorus hirsuta Sond.; Urostigma fazokelense Miq.; Urostigma glumosum Miq.; Urostigma rubicundum Miq.

= Ficus glumosa =

Mountain fig

Species of tree

Ficus glumosa, also known as the mountain fig or hairy rock fig, is an Afrotropical fig shrub or tree, growing up to 20 m tall. It is found over a range of elevations and broken terrain types, including kopjes, outcrops, escarpments and lava flows, or in woodlands. It is for the greater part absent from the tropical rainforest zone, or the dry interior regions of Botswana, Namibia and South Africa.

== Identification ==
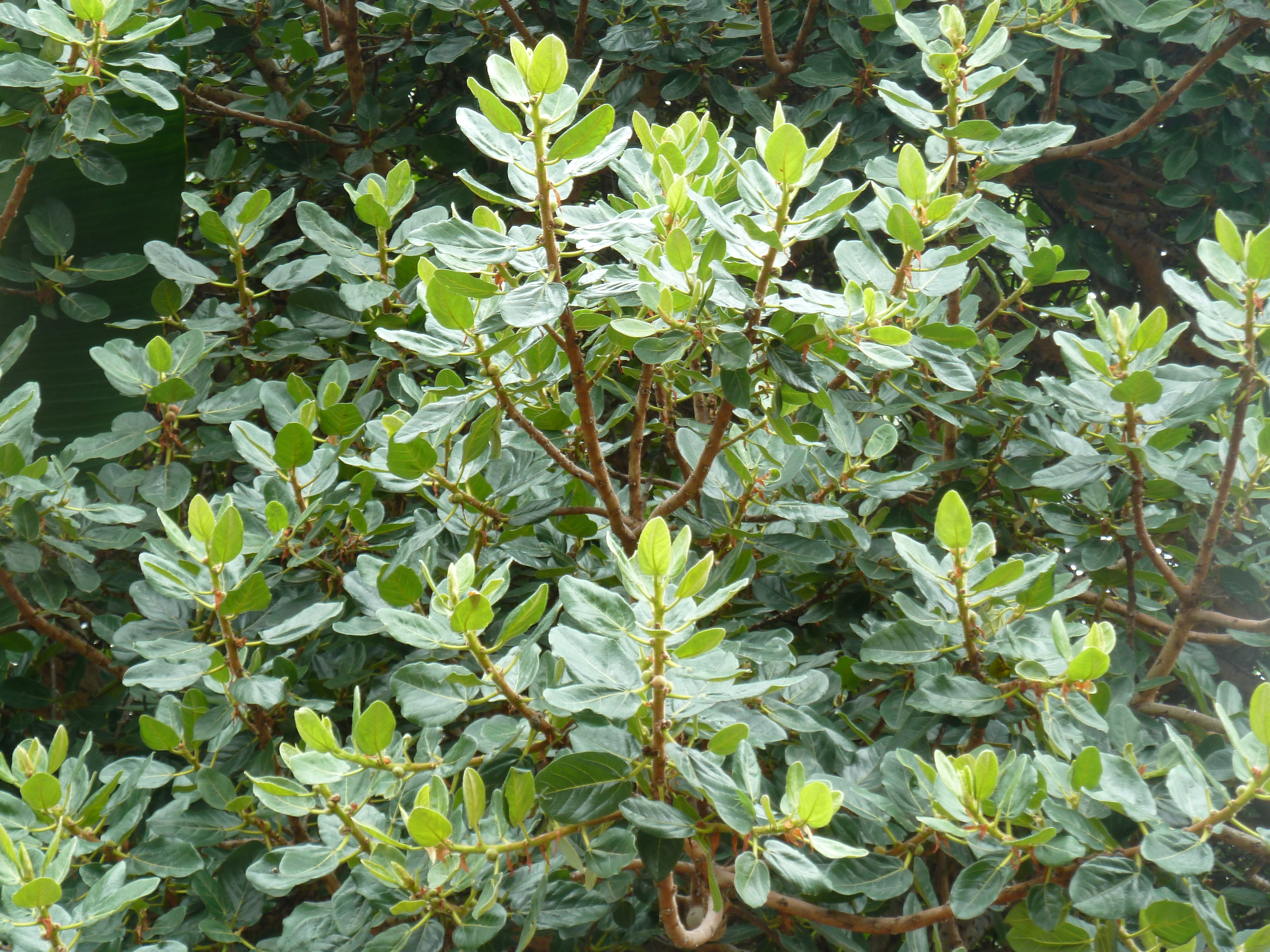
Spirally arranged leaves

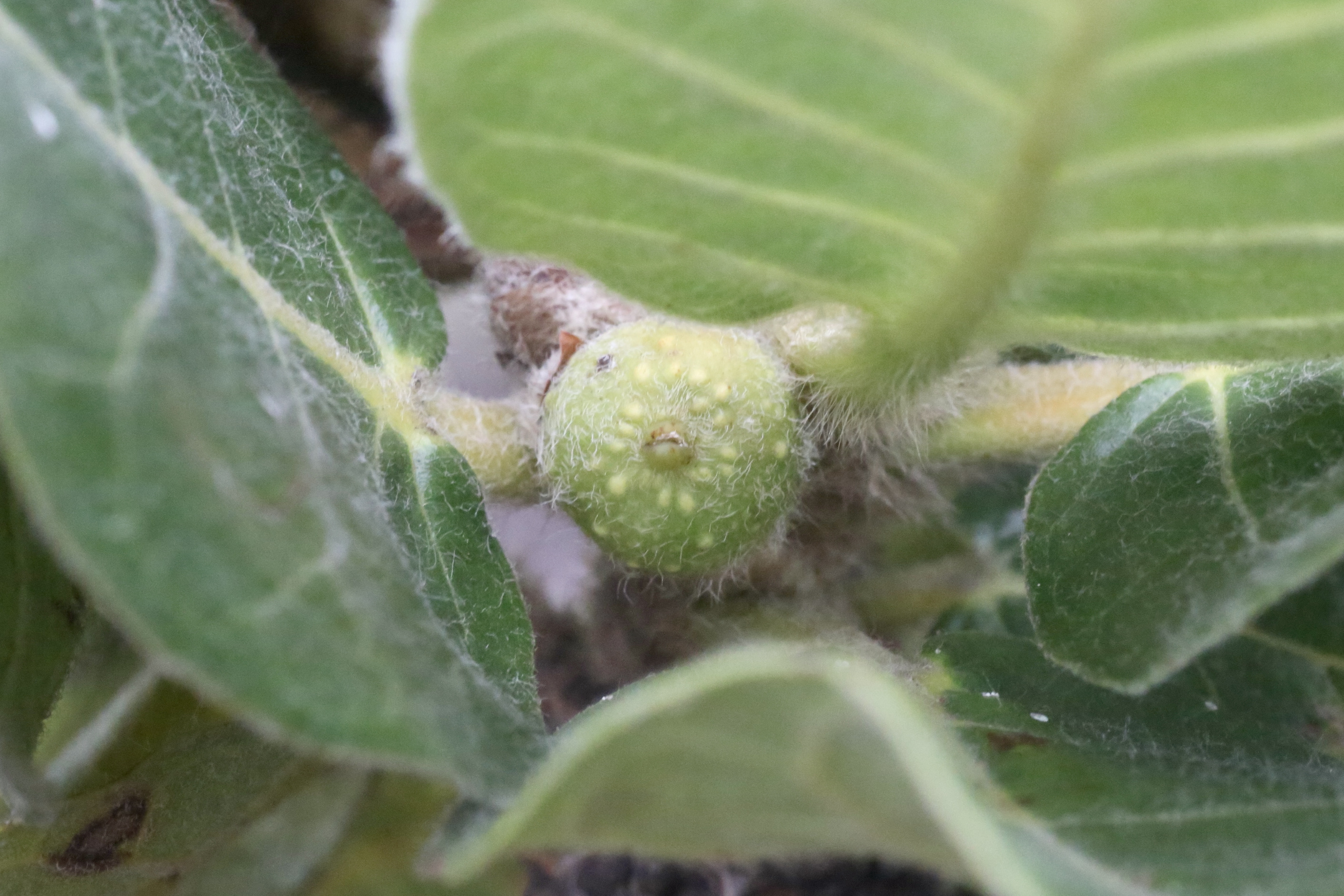
Fruit

Bark is cream coloured, flaking, with the branchlets densely covered with yellow brown hairs. Leaves are alternate, broadly elliptical 30 – 140 x 15 – 95mm in size, 3-veined from the base, veins are raised on the underside of the leaf. Figs are 8 to 15mm diameter, hairy and red when ripe, singly or paired in leaf axils, clustered toward branch ends. The fruit is much favoured by birds, bats, antelope, monkey and baboons.
