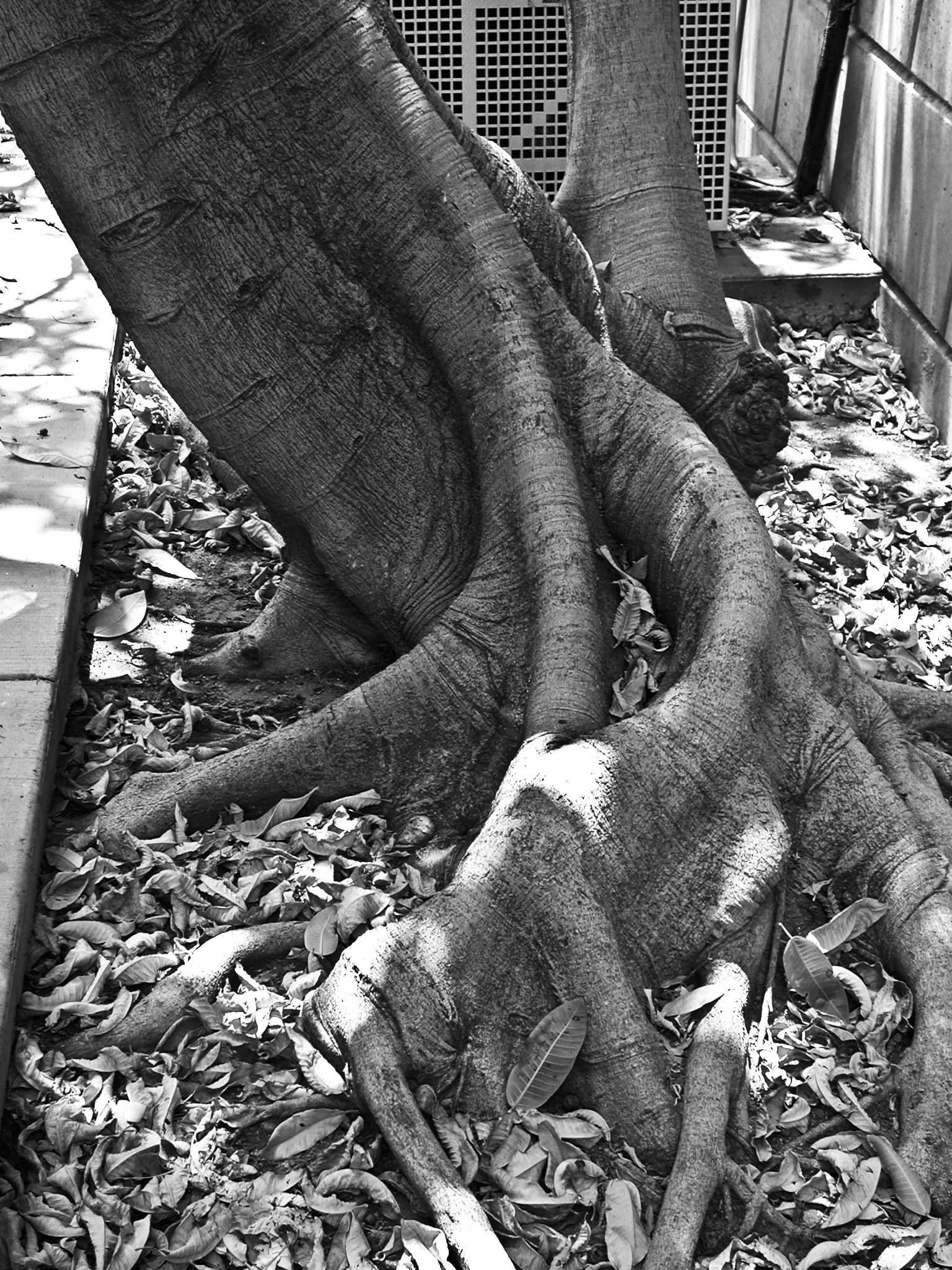
- Roots

Conservation status
- Least Concern (IUCN 3.1)

Scientific classification
- Kingdom: Plantae
- Clade: Tracheophytes
- Clade: Angiosperms
- Clade: Eudicots
- Clade: Rosids
- Order: Rosales
- Family: Moraceae
- Genus: Ficus
- Subgenus: F. subg. Pharmacosycea
- Species: F. insipida

Binomial name
- Ficus insipida Willd.

Synonyms
- Ficus anthelminthica Mart.; Ficus glabrata Kunth; Ficus helminthagoga Dugand; Ficus longistipula Pittier; Ficus palmirana Dugand; Ficus werckleana Rossberg; Ficus whitei Rusby; Pharmacosycea anthelmintica Miq.; Pharmacosycea brittonii Rusby; Galoglychia martinicensis Gasp.

= Ficus insipida =

Species of fig tree from the Neotropics

Ficus insipida is a common tropical tree in the fig genus of the family Moraceae growing in forest habitats along rivers. It ranges from Mexico to northern South America.

== Taxonomy ==
The tree was described in 1806 under the scientific name Ficus insipida (literally "insipid fig") by Carl Ludwig Willdenow, having studied the herbarium specimens collected in Caracas by the gardener Franz Bredemeyer in the 1780s during the Märter Expedition. Willdenow reports its fruit are tasteless. Incongruously, among the many species of figs to grow in the region, this species is in fact recognisable by its large and sweet figs (when ripe).

In the 1960 Flora of Panama, Gordon P. DeWolf Jr. lumped the species F. adhatodifolia and F. crassiuscula as synonyms of F. insipida, but his taxonomic interpretation was not followed by subsequent authorities.

Ficus expert Cees Berg distinguished two allopatric or almost allopatric subspecies in 1984:

- Ficus insipida subsp. insipida Willd. - Largely glabrous twigs, leaves and petioles. Occurs in Mesoamerica, the Caribbean, Venezuela to Bolivia.
- Ficus insipida subsp. scabra C.C.Berg - Much hairier plant. Occurs in the Guianas, from Venezuela to northeast Brazil.

With about 750 species, Ficus (Moraceae) is one of the largest angiosperm genera. F. insipida is classified in subgenus Pharmacosycea, section Pharmacosycea, subsection Bergianae (for which it is the type species), along with F. adhatodifolia, F. carchiana, F. crassiuscula, F. gigantosyce, F. lapathifolia, F. mutisii, F. oapana (spec. nov.? ined.), F. obtusiuscula, F. piresiana, F. rieberiana and F. yoponensis. Although recent work suggests that subgenus Pharmacosycea is polyphyletic, section Pharmacosycea appears to be monophyletic and is a sister group to the rest of the genus Ficus.

Mysteriously, genetic testing of a single individual of the three fig species F. maxima, F. tonduzii and F. yoponensis, each collected on Barro Colorado Island in Panama, found each species to be phylogenetically nestled within F. insipida. All four species occur together in a similar large range, but nonetheless, these species are quite easily differentiated morphologically. Strangely, in the case of the F. maxima and F. tonduzii specimens, these were nestled within a different haplotype, with an Amazonian distribution, as opposed to clustering within the haplotype found contemporaneously in Panama. An explanation for this is not readily apparent: the species may have recently evolved from F. insipida, although this would seem unlikely, or perhaps all three specimens just happened to be hybrids, another unlikely possibility.

== Description ==
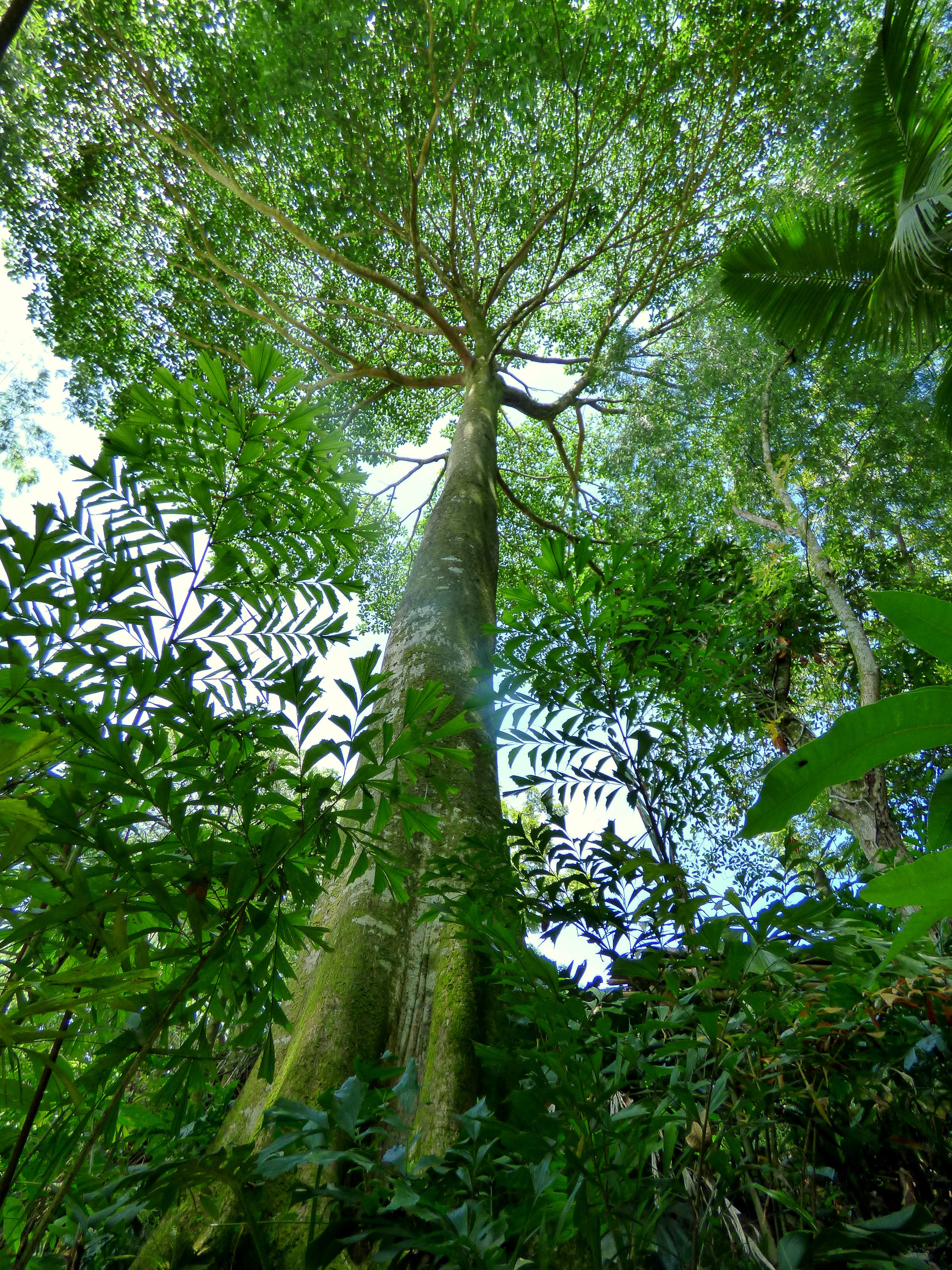
A non-climbing fig, the trunk has a smooth, straight bole, with smooth bark and fluted with buttress roots.

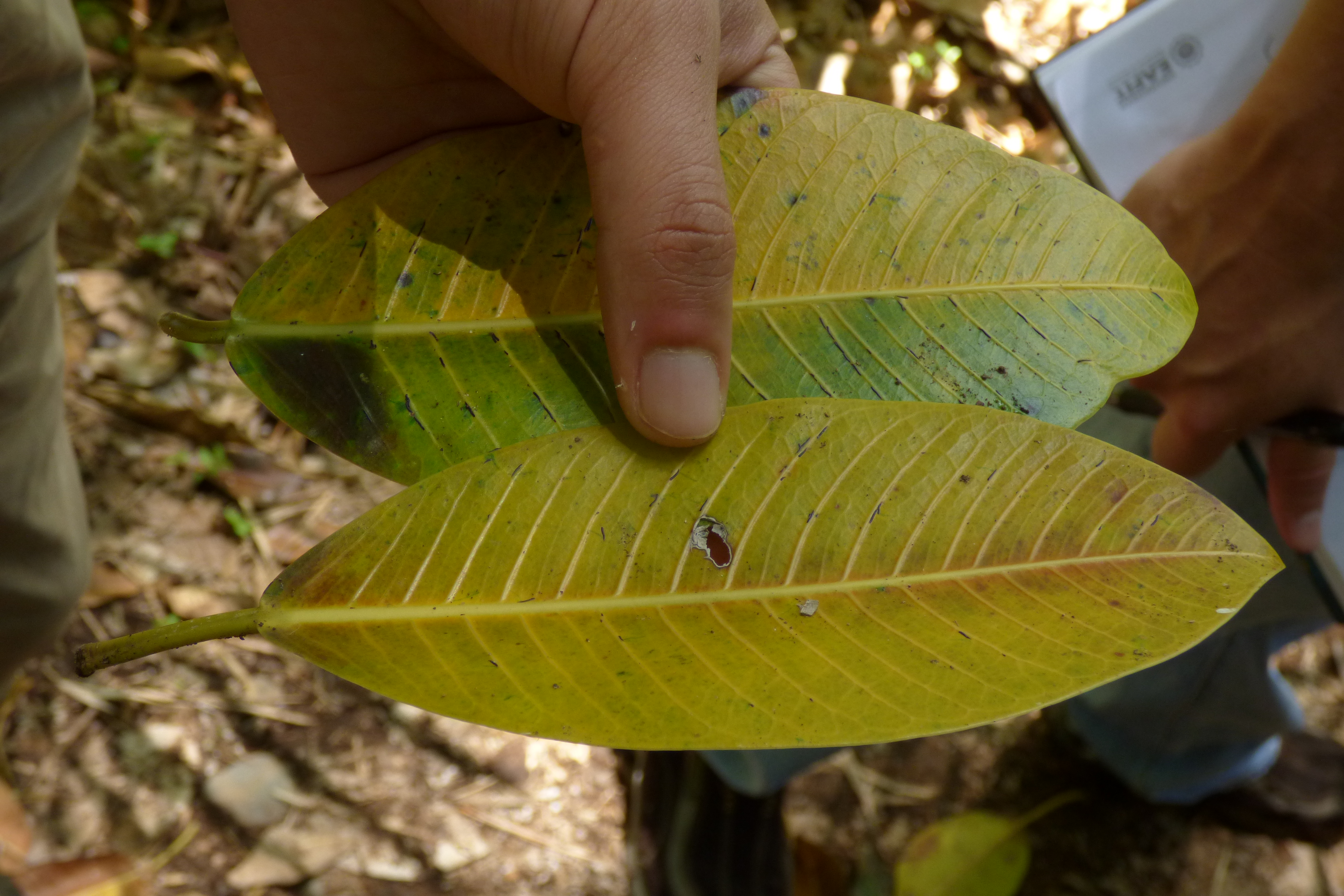
The leaf veins are coloured yellow, and the entire leaf becomes bright yellow after it falls from the tree

This is a tree with buttress roots that ranges from 8–40 m (26–131 ft) tall. Because this is a pioneer species which quickly colonises secondary forest, and it is also a fast-growing species which can grow into a massive tree in only 100 years or so, it is generally readily recognisable as the largest trees in such secondary woodlands.

Leaves vary shape from narrow to ellipse-shaped; they range from 5–25 cm (2.0–9.8 in) long and from 2–11 cm (0.79–4.33 in) wide.

=== Similar species ===
In Costa Rica or Panama it may be confused with Ficus yoponensis, but this similar lowland fig tree has smaller leaves, stipules and fruit, and only occurs in primary forest, whereas F. insipida is also found in secondary forest. Another similar fig species in this area is F. crassivenosa, but this species has differently shaped leaves and does not have the same habitat preference (the tendency to grow in association with water courses).

== Distribution ==
The nominate subspecies occurs from Mexico south throughout Central America to Colombia and Venezuela and thence to Ecuador, Bolivia, Peru and Amazonian Brazil, and north from Venezuela to Trinidad and Tobago and the Lesser Antilles, whereas subspecies scabra occurs from the Guianan Shield of northeast Venezuela eastwards through the Guianas to northwestern Brazil in the states of Amapá and Pará.

In Mexico it has been recorded to occur in the states of Chihuahua, Durango, San Luis Potosí, Sinaloa, Sonora, Tamaulipas and Zacatecas in the north, southwards to Campeche, Chiapas, Colima, Guerrero, Hidalgo, Jalisco, México, Michoacán de Ocampo, Morelos, Nayarit, Oaxaca, Puebla, Querétaro, Tabasco and Veracruz de Ignacio de la Llave. In both Costa Rica and Nicaragua it is found in lowlands along both the Atlantic and Pacific coasts, as well as in the central valleys.

In Bolivia it has been recorded in the northern and eastern departments of Beni, Cochabamba, La Paz, Pando and Santa Cruz: most of the country except the Andes in the southwest. In Ecuador it is known from the provinces of Esmeraldas, Imbabura, Manabí, Morona-Santiago, Napo, Pastaza, Sucumbíos and Zamora-Chinchipe. In Colombia the species has been recorded in the departments of Amazonas, Antioquia, Bolívar, Boyacá, Caquetá, Casanare, Cauca, Chocó, Cundinamarca, La Guajira, Guaviare, Huila, Magdalena, Meta, Nariño, Norte de Santander, Putumayo, Risaralda, Santander, Tolima and Valle.

The distribution in Brazil includes, besides Amapá and Pará mentioned above, the states of Acre, Amazonas and Rondônia. In the state of Pará both subspecies appear to occur, although this is unclear.

=== Prehistoric distribution ===
Although it is often stated that the Amazon rainforest is ancient, much of it has in fact grown quite recently, after the end of the last Ice Age and with a large expansion to the south 3,000 years ago. During the Ice Age large tracts of the Amazon were covered in savanna, with the forest having retreated to numerous refugia. Traces of this were found in the genetic structure of the populations of the nominate subspecies: although populations are reasonably diverse from Mexico to the Andes area, the trees in the populations in most of the Amazon area are genetically similar to one another, with the occurrence of a "single widespread haplotype" and the trees in much of Bolivia having no discernable genetic diversity found in the tested sequences at all, indicating they only recently colonised this region. In this the species shows a similar pattern to other lowland, rainforest trees.

=== Spatial distribution ===
The nominate subspecies is quite common in Nicaragua and Panama, but subspecies scabra is conversely said to be a rare tree in the Guianas.

== Ecology ==
=== Habitat ===
The typical habitat of the nominate subspecies is lowland forests down to the coast. Ficus insipida subsp. insipida does not grow above 1,100m in Costa Rica, and is found down to 50m, or sea level. It grows between 0–700m in altitude in Nicaragua (exceptionally up to 1300m). It can be found in either very humid, humid or dry climates, but it is almost always encountered growing along rivers, and often on slopes. It is found in thickly wooded small hills abutting the coast in Atlantic Costa Rica.

The scabra subspecies appears to have a slightly different habitat preference, being typically found on slopes in either rainforest or mountain savannas in the Guianas.

=== Lifecycle and community ecology ===
Like many figs and other rainforest fruit trees, F. insipida is a 'mass-fruiter', and like many (tropical rainforest) figs but unlike many rainforest fruit trees, individual F. insipida trees fruit according to a staggered, asynchronous schedule with respect to other neighbouring conspecifics. Thus, irrespective of the season, there is always a fig flowering and fruiting somewhere, which can be advantageous to wildlife, and functions to force its wasp pollinators to seek out a new tree, and thus foster cross pollination. Like the fruit, the new leaves are produced in asynchronous flushes.

It is a monoecious species, the figs, actually a specialised inflorescence called a synconium, are densely coated in minute flowers ('florets') on the inside, both functionally male and female. The female flowers mature first; they are found in two different versions, with a short or long style. The stigmas of the female flowers are thickly intertwined and coherent to each other at the same height (short-styled florets are simply positioned somewhat higher using pedicels and somewhat longer ovaries to maintain the stigma surface), and form a surface layer a certain distance from the inner wall of the fig, called the synstigma - this synstigma essentially functions as a platform on which the pollinating wasps must walk and from where they must oviposit their eggs. The synstigma is so coherent, pollen tubes may grow from one stigma into the ovule of another neighbouring floret. The length specified by the distance between the synstigma and the ovules helps determine which wasp species may live in a particular fig species, and also cause the females to mostly lay their eggs in the short-styled florets (although in F. insipida this is not so strict, and both types of florets are fertile and both can host a wasp larva).

The flowers found within the figs of F. insipida are pollinated by the females of tiny wasps belonging to the genus Tetrapus, which complete much of their lifecycle within the developing figs. The female wasps are weak-jawed, and rely on the males to free them from their figs and individual fruit in which they develop and pupate, but only the females are winged, and can thus fly to the next fig to lay their eggs. The males develop first, they are wingless but have stronger jaws, which they use to chew their way to freedom from their host ovule. Once free, they chew free the females, copulating with them while the females are still largely trapped in their ovules -this ensures each female has sex, females which do not copulate will only produce males as offspring. The males also chew holes through the walls of the fig and open up the ostiole (a small opening at the apex of the fig), allowing the females to escape. Meanwhile, the male flowers within the fig finally shed their pollen, which adhere to the females in specialised pockets or simply onto their body surface. The females search for a new fig in which to lay their eggs, and upon arriving upon one must embark upon their greatest challenge: forcing their way within through the ostiole. Although the wasps are quite minuscule, they nonetheless regularly undertake reasonable journeys, as can be seen in the genetic structure of the fig tree populations: there is clear evidence of abundant outcrossing in the nuclear DNA (which is transported in the pollen dusted on the females, as opposed to mitochondrial DNA). The ostiole is barred by a series of bracts, but unlike in many other Ficus species, only the uppermost ostiolar bracts are interlocking and patent, with the inner bracts positioned inward and relatively open, thus forming a long slit-like tunnel allowing access to the central cavity. Nevertheless, entering the cavity is a strenuous task, and the females are often die in the tunnel, or are damaged by the ordeal, with their wings invariably torn off from forcing their way through the bracts. Once inside, the females inject their eggs with their ovipositor, through the styles of the correct length, into the ovules: one egg an ovule. While doing so, the females pollinate the other flowers when walking around on the synstigmatic surface. The seeds and the larvae mature in a few weeks, at approximately the same rate.

It uses zoochory to disperse its seeds. The figs are eaten by bats, howler, spider and capuchin monkeys in the Guianas. An especially important species to aid in dispersal via endozoochory in Costa Rica is possibly the large and common trout-like fish Brycon guatemalensis, of which the adults primarily feed upon the fallen leaves and figs of F. insipida. The seeds can survive the passage through the gut of the fish, although their viability is significantly diminished. Nonetheless, the fish may have a specific value for the fig as a dispersal agent: this fig species primarily and typically is found along rivers, and fish have the advantage of generally dispersing the seeds along rivers. Furthermore, fish are able to disperse upriver, and thus maintain upriver populations, whereas dispersal by floating the figs in water (hydrochory) alone is generally in a downriver direction (in most habitats). The leaves and especially the fruit of F. insipida and F. yoponensis are a preferred food of howler monkeys in Panama (Alouatta palliata), with one troop on Barro Colorado Island spending one quarter of its time feeding on these two types of trees. The asynchronous plant characteristics, and the food preference of the monkeys, results in the monkeys adopting specific foraging routes in order to check up on the status of as much of the potential trees as can be done efficiently.

== Uses ==
The latex is sold in South America as an anthelmintic, marketed as 'doctor oje' (ojé in Brazil). An analysis of overdoses in one area of Peru found only 3 cases that were apparently fatal and 39 cases requiring hospitalization over a 12 year period, which, based on an analysis of probable sales in the region, amounted to very low 0.01–0.015% fatality and 0.13–0.2% hospitalization rates. The authors concluded the product was safe when dosed properly. No serious adverse effects were observed in any of several clinical trials on the product conducted in Peru, except for possibly one miscarriage in one 18-year-old woman (who did not disclose her pregnancy to those running the clinical trial) receiving a very low dose of ojé.

The latex can be purified, leaving a complex of enzymes known as ficin, a white powder that was first produced in 1930. This product is likely safe. It was initially observed that intestinal nematodes dissolved in a ficin solution, which increased interest in the product at the time as an anthelmintic, although it was not widely adopted.

Ficin is a mix of different enzymes and can be produced from many different species of Ficus. The main proteolytic enzyme found in ficin produced from F. insipida has officially been named ficain. Purified ficin has numerous medical and industrial uses. It is used for cleaning in the production of stitching material for sutures, to prepare animal arteries before transplantation into humans, and for unmasking antigens in serology. It is similarly used for cleaning the animal intestines used as sausage or cheese-casings. It is used as an additive to make freeze-resistant beer, and has been added to certain formulations of meat tenderizers along with related protease-type enzymes.

According to Schultes and Raffauf in their 1990 book The Healing Forest, the fruit of Ficus anthelmintica (an antiquated synonym of F. insipida) has been used by an unknown people somewhere in the northern Amazon of Brazil as an aphrodisiac and for what they categorise as a 'memory enhancer'.

== Conservation ==
As of 2021, the conservation status has not been assessed by the Centro Nacional de Conservação da Flora, nor in the IUCN Red List, nor by the Costa Rican national authority. In Costa Rica this species is present in numerous protected areas, such as Estación Biológica La Selva, Carara National Park, Corcovado National Park, and Jairo Mora Sandoval Gandoca-Manzanillo Mixed Wildlife Refuge.
