= Ficus crassiuscula =

Conservation status
- Least Concern (IUCN 3.1)

Scientific classification
- Kingdom: Plantae
- Clade: Tracheophytes
- Clade: Angiosperms
- Clade: Eudicots
- Clade: Rosids
- Order: Rosales
- Family: Moraceae
- Genus: Ficus
- Subgenus: F. subg. Ficus
- Species: F. crassiuscula

Binomial name
- Ficus crassiuscula Warb. ex Standl.

Synonyms
- Ficus boyacensis Dugand; Ficus crassa Klotzsch & H.Karst. ex Dugand

Species of fig from the Neotropics

Ficus crassiuscula is a species of flowering plant in the family Moraceae, native to Central America (Guatemala, Honduras, Belize, Nicaragua, Costa Rica, Panama) and north-western parts of South America (Colombia, Ecuador, Peru and Venezuela).

== Taxonomy ==
Ficus crassiuscula was first described in 1917. In the 1960 Flora of Panama Gordon P. DeWolf Jr. considered this species to be a synonym of the non-climbing F. insipida, but this taxonomic interpretation has not been followed by subsequent authorities.

With about 750 species, Ficus (Moraceae) is one of the largest angiosperm genera. F. insipida is classified in subgenus Pharmacosycea, section Pharmacosycea, subsection Bergianae, along with F. adhatodifolia, F. carchiana, F. gigantosyce, F. insipida, F. lapathifolia, F. mutisii, F. oapana (spec. nov.? ined.), F. obtusiuscula, F. piresiana, F. rieberiana and F. yoponensis. Although recent work suggests that subgenus Pharmacosycea is polyphyletic, section Pharmacosycea appears to be monophyletic and is a sister group to the rest of the genus Ficus.

== Description ==
Among the fig species in subgenus Pharmacosycea, Ficus crassiuscula is quite unique: all the other species are tall, non-climbing, free-growing trees, but F. crassiuscula instead starts its life as an epiphyte (it is a hemiepiphyte), usually germinating near the ground on the lower tree trunk. It spreads from here as a vine, which roots freely at its nodes in order to climb. As a juvenile it also spreads along the ground, sometimes eventually forming a sprawling thicket - this enables the plant to find its favourite host trees. Eventually parts of it change from a vine to sapling with erect stems, which may eventually become the mature tree, this transformation usually occur when the vine has reached the crotch of a branch or the top of a tree stump.

It has dimorphic leaves: the leaves of this species change in shape as it progresses from a juvenile to a mature plant.

When mature, it is 20 to 35 meters tall. The leaves are ovoid and shiny, reaching 7cm wide and 16cm long. It flowers February to April and bears warty, yellow-green fruit that are 4 to 6 cm in diameter.

== Ecology ==
It is found in lower montane rainforests. In Costa Rica, F. crassiuscula is found in cloud forest above 1550 meters in elevation. Although it is a free-standing tree when mature, F. crassiuscula begins its growth as a climbing vine. It clings to a mature tree, eventually strangling it. Its favoured hosts are Guarea tuisana and Sapium pachystachys, and it is also frequently found on already-dead trees.

Monkeys feed on fruits while they are still on the tree, and the fallen fruits are eaten by peccaries.

== Uses ==
The wood is soft, but it is used for construction purposes where durability is not important.
