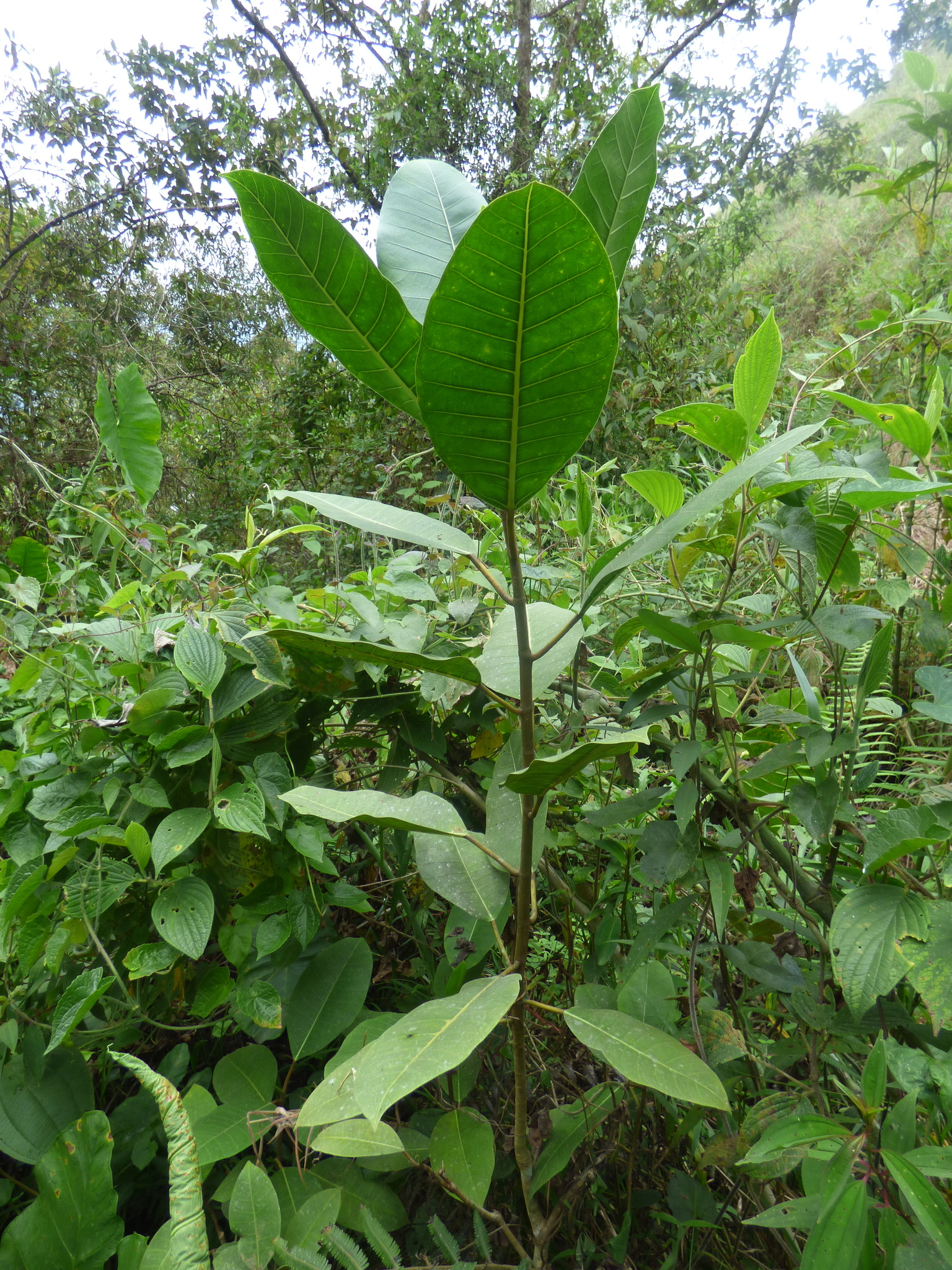
- Ficus tonduzii

Scientific classification
- Kingdom: Plantae
- Clade: Embryophytes
- Clade: Tracheophytes
- Clade: Spermatophytes
- Clade: Angiosperms
- Clade: Eudicots
- Clade: Rosids
- Order: Rosales
- Family: Moraceae
- Genus: Ficus
- Subgenus: F. subg. Pharmacosycea; Corner

Sections
- Oreosycea; Pharmacosycea

= Ficus subg. Pharmacosycea =

Subgenus of flowering plants

Pharmacosycea is one of six subgenera currently recognised in the genus Ficus. It was proposed by E. J. H. Corner in 1967 to unite section Pharmacosycea with Oreosycea.

Recent molecular phylogenies has shown that the subgenus is polyphyletic. Section Pharmacosycea is a sister taxa to the rest of the genus Ficus, while section Oreosycea is itself polyphyletic.

== Section Oreosycea ==
Section Oreosycea is Palaeotropical in distribution.

Subsection Glandulosae includes (not complete)

- Ficus asperula Bureau
- Ficus auriculigera Bureau
- Ficus austrocaledonica Bureau
- Ficus barraui Guillaumin
- Ficus bubulia C.C. Berg
- Ficus carinata C.C. Berg
- Ficus cataractorum Bureau
- Ficus crescentioides Bureau
- Ficus dzumacensis Guillaumin
- Ficus edelfeltii King
- Ficus mutabilis Bureau
- Ficus nervosa Heyne ex Roth

Subsection Pedunculatae includes

- Ficus albipila (Miquel) King - Abbey tree
- Ficus bataanensis Merrill
- Ficus callosa Willdenow
- Ficus capillipes Gagnepain
- Ficus vasculosa Miquel

== Section Pharmacosycea ==
Section Pharmacosycea is Neotropical. Cornelis Berg recognised two subsections: Bergianae and Petenenses.

Subsection Bergianae includes

- Ficus adhatodifolia Schott
- Ficus carchiana C.C. Berg
- Ficus crassiuscula Standl.
- Ficus gigantosyce Dugand
- Ficus insipida Willd. (subsp. insipida and subsp. scabra C.C. Berg)
- Ficus lapathifolia (Liebm.) Miq.
- Ficus mutisii Dugand,
- Ficus oapana C.C. Berg
- Ficus obtusiuscula (Miq.) Miq.
- Ficus piresiana Vázq.Avila & C.C. Berg
- Ficus rieberiana C.C. Berg
- Ficus yoponensis Desv.

Subsection Petenenses includes

- Ficus apollinaris Dugand (= F. petenensis Lundell)
- Ficus ecuadorensis C.C. Berg
- Ficus guajavoides Lundell,
- Ficus lacunata Kvitvik
- Ficus loxensis C.C. Berg
- Ficus macbridei Standl.,
- Ficus maxima Mill.
- Ficus maximoides C.C. Berg
- Ficus pulchella Schott
- Ficus tonduzii Standl.
