= T. americanus =

T. americanus may refer to:

- Tetrapus americanus, a wasp species
- Tomistoma americanus, an extinct crocodile species in the genus Tomistoma
- Typhlodromus americanus, a mite species in the genus Typhlodromus

== See also ==
- Americanus (disambiguation)
