= Villaba =

Municipality in Leyte, Philippines

- Municipality
- Municipality of Villaba
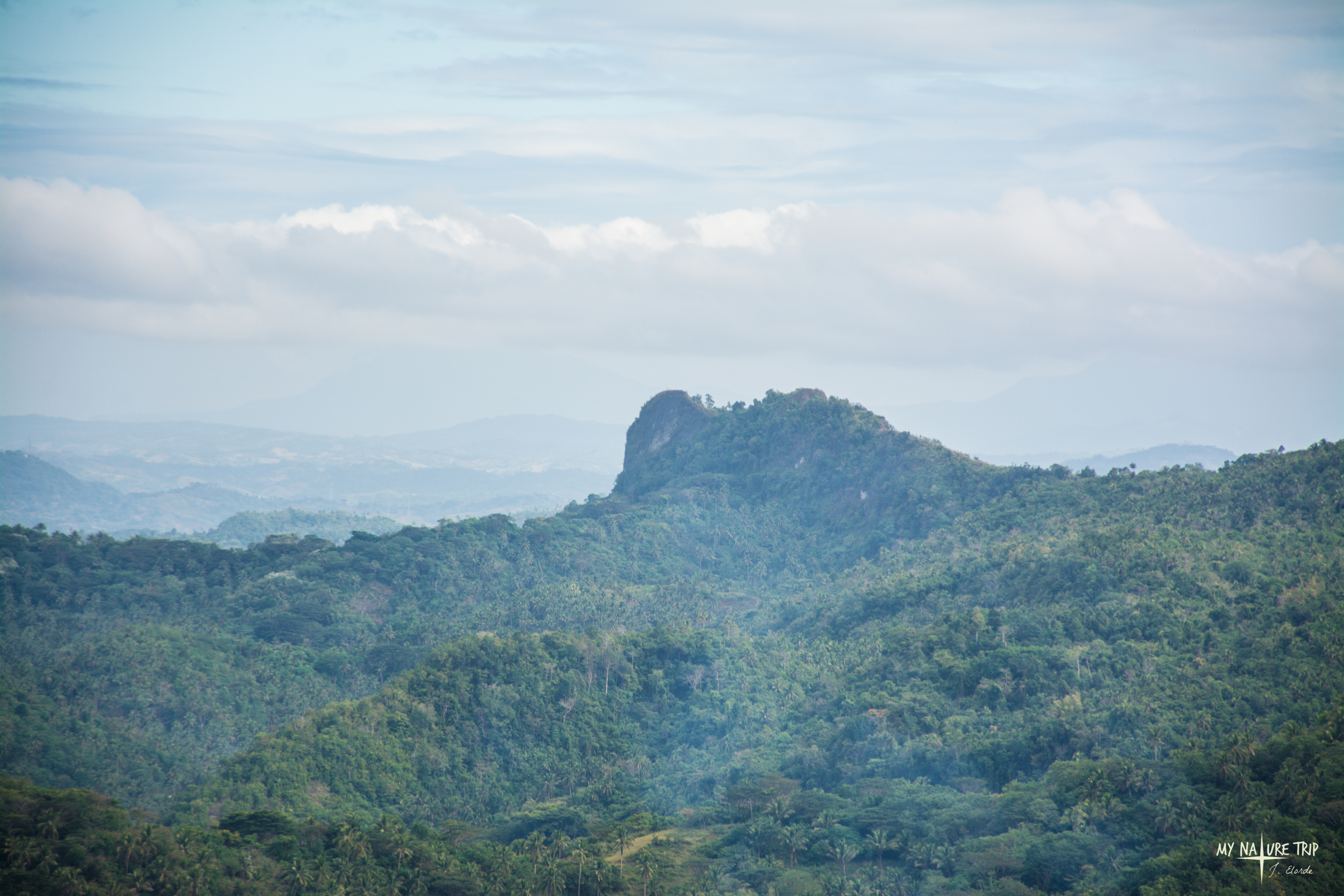
- The Mt. Buga-buga viewed from barangay Abijao, Villaba

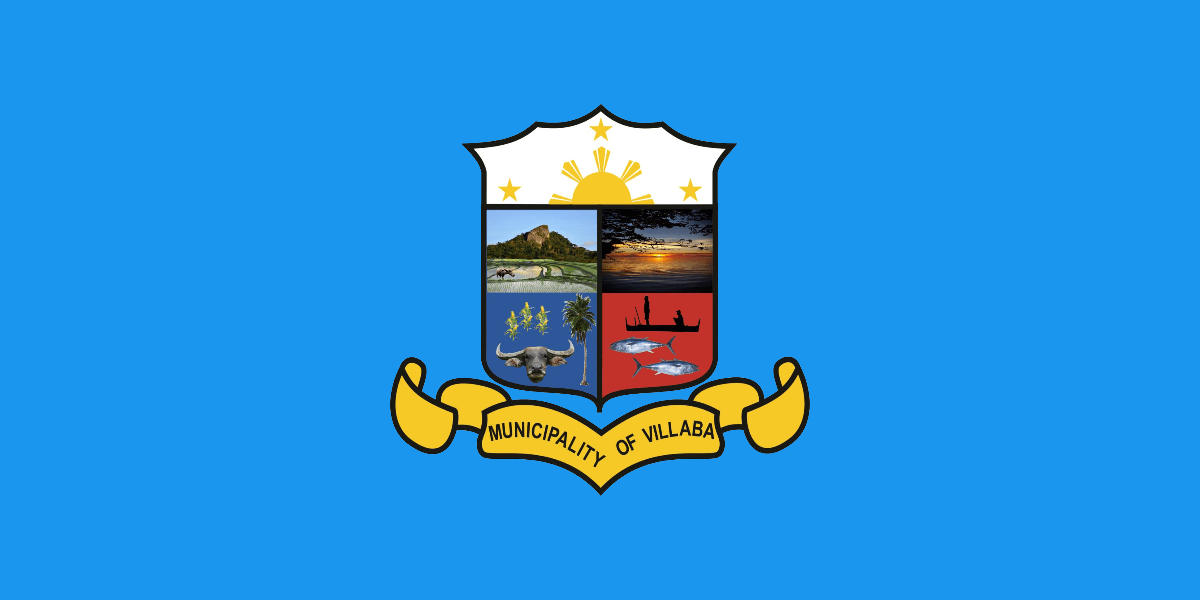
- Flag

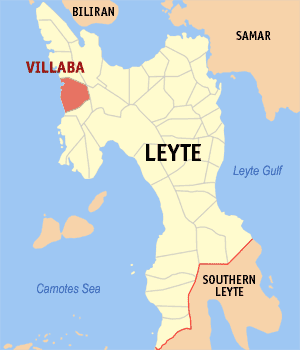
- Map of Leyte with Villaba highlighted
- Interactive map of Villaba
- Location within the Philippines
- Coordinates: 11°13′N 124°24′E
- Country: Philippines
- Region: Eastern Visayas
- Province: Leyte
- District: 3rd district
- Barangays: 35 (see Barangays)

Government
  - Type: Sangguniang Bayan
  - Mayor: Carlos G. Veloso
  - Vice Mayor: Edgar T. Veloso
  - Representative: Anna Veloso-Tuazon
  - Councilors: List: • Mc Quirie P. Umpad; • Violeta T. Sumapig; • Joselita N. Enevoldsen; • Kathleen V. Mape; • Rogelio J. Baay; • Felipe S. Casas; • Niel Albert B. Inopiquez; • Roque M. Compra; DILG Masterlist of Officials
  - Electorate: 30,282 voters (2025)

Area
  - Total: 150.31 km^{2} (58.04 sq mi)
- Elevation: 29 m (95 ft)
- Highest elevation: 442 m (1,450 ft)
- Lowest elevation: 0 m (0 ft)

Population (2024 census)
  - Total: 42,981
  - Density: 285.95/km^{2} (740.60/sq mi)
  - Households: 11,022

Economy
  - Income class: 2nd municipal income class
  - Poverty incidence: 30.83% (2023)
  - Revenue: ₱ 242.6 million (2024)
  - Assets: ₱ 475 million (2024)
  - Expenditure: ₱ 237.1 million (2024)
  - Liabilities: ₱ 96.67 million (2024)

Service provider
  - Electricity: Leyte 5 Electric Cooperative (LEYECO 5)
- Time zone: UTC+8 (PST)
- ZIP code: 6537
- PSGC: 0803751000
- IDD : area code: +63 (0)53
- Native languages: Cebuano

Villaba (IPA: [vɪ'ʎabɐ]), officially the Municipality of Villaba (Cebuano: Lungsod sa Villaba; Waray: Bungto han Villaba; Tagalog: Bayan ng Villaba), is a municipality in the province of Leyte, Philippines. According to the 2024 census, it has a population of 42,981 people.

Villaba is a coastal municipality in the province of Leyte. The municipality covers a land area of 150.31 square kilometers (58.04 square miles), accounting for 2.37% of Leyte's total area. According to the 2024 Census, its population was 42,981, representing 2.36% of Leyte's total population and 0.93% of the entire Eastern Visayas region. This results in a population density of 285 inhabitants per square kilometer (740 inhabitants per square mile).

== Geography ==
=== Barangays ===
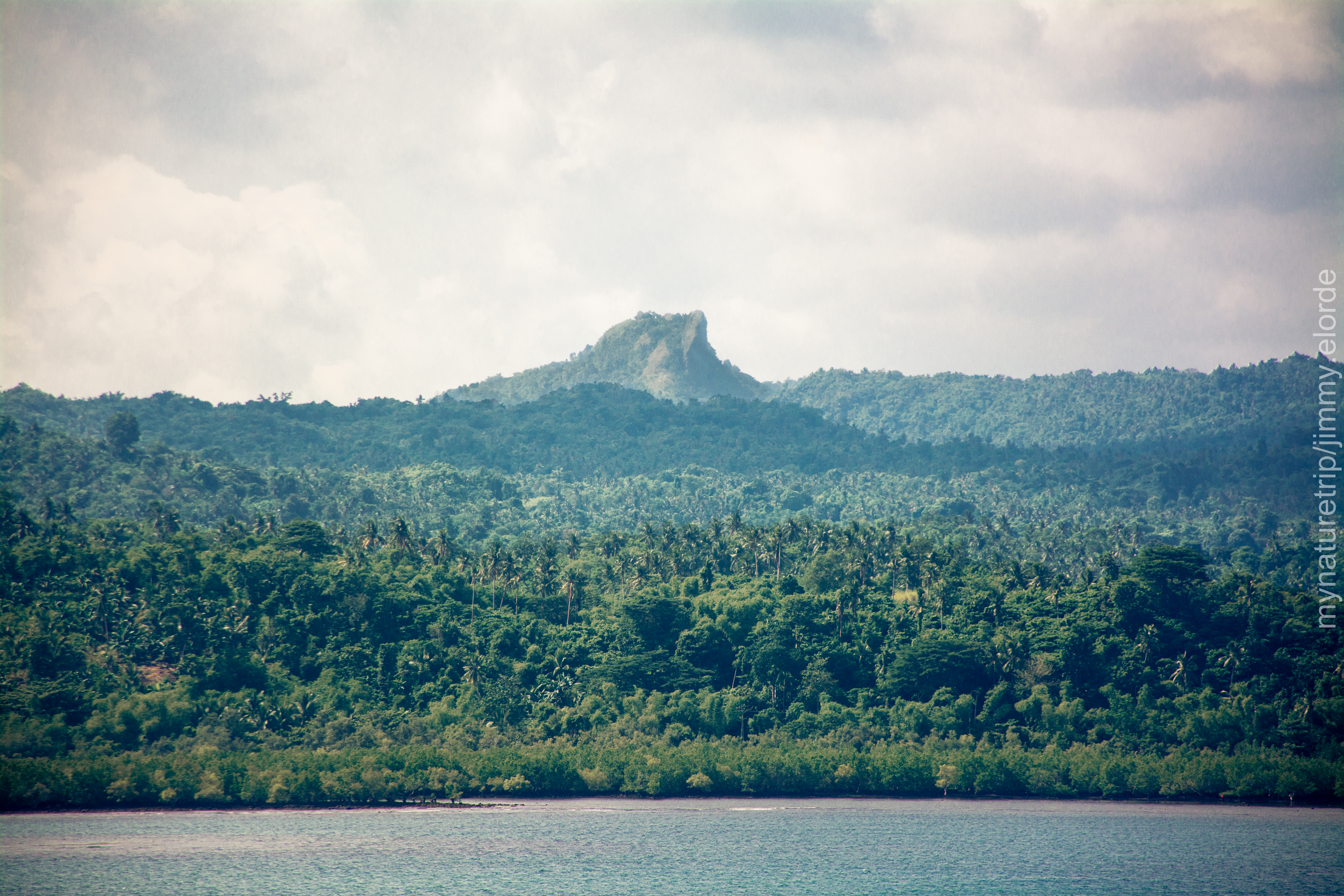
The Mt. Buga-buga

Villaba is politically subdivided into 35 barangays.

1. Abijao
2. Balite
3. Bangkal
4. Buga-buga
5. Cagnocot
6. Cabunga-an (A Tumamak)
7. Cabungahan
8. Cahigan
9. Calbugos
10. Campurog
11. Canquiason
12. Capinyahan
13. Casili-on
14. Catagbacan
15. Fatima (Poblacion)
16. Hibulangan
17. Hinabuyan
18. Iligay
19. Jalas
20. Jordan
21. Libagong
22. New Balanac
23. Payao
24. Poblacion Norte
25. Poblacion Sur
26. Sambulawan
27. San Francisco
28. San Vicente
29. Santa Cruz
30. Silad
31. Suba
32. Sulpa
33. Tabunok
34. Tagbubunga
35. Tinghub

=== Climate ===
Climate data for Villaba, Leyte
Month	Jan	Feb	Mar	Apr	May	Jun	Jul	Aug	Sep	Oct	Nov	Dec	Year
Mean daily maximum °C (°F)	28 (82)	29 (84)	29 (84)	31 (88)	31 (88)	30 (86)	30 (86)	30 (86)	30 (86)	29 (84)	29 (84)	29 (84)	30 (85)
Mean daily minimum °C (°F)	22 (72)	22 (72)	22 (72)	23 (73)	24 (75)	25 (77)	25 (77)	25 (77)	25 (77)	24 (75)	24 (75)	23 (73)	24 (75)
Average precipitation mm (inches)	73 (2.9)	56 (2.2)	75 (3.0)	71 (2.8)	114 (4.5)	174 (6.9)	172 (6.8)	163 (6.4)	167 (6.6)	161 (6.3)	158 (6.2)	125 (4.9)	1,509 (59.5)
Average rainy days	15.2	12.5	16.2	17.3	23.9	27.3	28.4	26.9	26.9	27.1	23.8	19.3	264.8
Source: Meteoblue

== History ==
=== Pre-Spanish history ===
The existence of the place now known as Villaba was discovered in about the last quarter of the sixteenth century by Boholano traders. These traders landed on the western coast and found fertile plains along the river and forest. The sea coast also proved to be good fishing ground. The settlers built their houses along the banks of the river and banded into groups to protect themselves from the moro pirates and wild animals. Along the banks of the river were "Hindang" trees which grew in abundance so they called the new settlement Hamindangon (full of hindang trees).

As the years passed, more settlers migrated from Bohol and Cebu. These new inhabitants likewise settled on the plains along the Hamindangon River.

=== Spanish period ===
During the expedition of the entire Eastern Visayas by Spanish conquistador in 1593, a group of Spaniards, led by the General-Governor's son, Luis Pérez Dasmariñas landed on the shores of Hamindangon and the named the place Nueva Galicia in honor of his father, the Governor-General of the Philippines, Gomez Perez Dasmariñas who is from Galicia, Spain.

The governor set sail from Cavite for Pintado province in October 1593, to join the part of the fleet under Luis Pérez who is already at the Visayas. Before he proceeded to Moluccas, Luis Pérez introduced the barrio of Nueva Galicia to the whole fleet. But the Governor-General renamed the place to Vilalba (from the Spanish town in Galicia region) in order not to confused with other Nueva Galicia town that is located in Mexico.

Over the years, the natives of the barrio had problem of Spanish accented digraphs, mispronouncing Vilalba (Spanish pronunciation: [biˈʎalβa]) with Villaba (IPA: [vɪ'ʎabɐ]), and perhaps, it is easier to pronounce the later name and thus retained it when the town was officially established in June 1910.

=== American period ===
The Spanish was defeated by the Americans who started their occupation of the Philippines on August 13, 1898. The following year, there was a popular revolt in the Visayas particularly in Samar and Leyte called the Pulahanes movement. One consequence of that revolution against the Americans was that the town of Villaba was reduced to a barrio and became part of the municipality of San Isidro, Leyte.

During that period, Villaba was then ran by local executives known as cabeza de barangay. For want of official records however, to provide a complete list and their specific terms of office, the following have served in the said capacity:

1. Andres Gervacio
2. Antonio Dejillo
3. Fortunato Cabilar
4. Hermogenes Tumamak
5. Casimiro Tumamak
6. Tomas Tumamak
7. Luciano Domael

=== The Villaba Town ===
In June 1910, the Provincial Board of Leyte passed and approved a resolution creating the Municipality of Villaba. Since then, there was a continuous change of Chief Executives in the municipality up to the present.

No.	Portrait	Name	Term
1		Juan Burgos	1910 - 1912
2		Flaviano Domael	1913 – 1915, 1919 – 1921, 1925 - 1927
3		Carmelino Rubillos	1916 - 1918
4		Paulino Dejillo	1922 - 1924
5		Damian Perez	1928 - 1930
6		Bartolome Esmas	1931 - 1939, October 1963 - December 1963
7		Vicente Veloso	1940 - 1945
8		Eusebio Gaviola	1945 - 1946
9		Fermin Tumamak	1946 - 1950
10		Francisco Burgos	1951 - 1959
11		Alberto S. Veloso	1960 - 1963
12		Sofronio Ramirez	1964 - 1967
13		Aurelio Veloso	1968 - April 1980
14		Antonio Villamor	May 1980 - April 20, 1986
15		Faustino Tumamak	April 21, 1986 - December 3, 1987 (OIC)
16		Roman Omega	December 4, 1987 - February 1988 (OIC)
17		Faustino Tumamak Jr.	February 1988 - March 1992, 1998 - 2004,
18		Leonora Rosal	March 1992 - June 1992
19		Jorge Vallar Veloso	June 1992 - 1998, 2013 - 2016, 2019 - June 2022
20		Claudio Martin Larrazabal	2004 - 2013
21		Juliet Aquino Larrazabal	2016 - 2019
22		Carlos Gonzalez Veloso	July 2022 – present

In November 2013, Villaba was among the towns in Leyte that were heavily affected by Typhoon Haiyan (Yolanda), which caused extensive destruction across the province.

On the night of September 30, 2025, at 21:59 PST, a 6.9 magnitude earthquake off Cebu was strongly felt in Villaba, where a landslide occurred in Barangay Abijao.

== Demographics ==
Population census of Villaba

Year	Pop.	±% p.a.
1903	4,127	—
1918	8,903	+5.26%
1939	16,823	+3.08%
1948	14,092	−1.95%
1960	24,844	+4.84%
1970	28,557	+1.40%
1975	29,144	+0.41%
1980	30,974	+1.22%

Year	Pop.	±% p.a.
1990	32,339	+0.43%
1995	34,674	+1.31%
2000	36,042	+0.83%
2007	37,838	+0.67%
2010	38,819	+0.94%
2015	41,891	+1.46%
2020	42,859	+0.48%
2024	42,981	+0.07%

Source: Philippine Statistics Authority

In the 2024 census, the population of Villaba was 42,981 people, with a density of 290 inhabitants per square kilometre or 750 inhabitants per square mile.

== Economy ==
Poverty incidence of Villaba (%)

Source: Philippine Statistics Authority
