= Ficus sodiroi =

Conservation status
- Vulnerable (IUCN 3.1)

Scientific classification
- Kingdom: Plantae
- Clade: Tracheophytes
- Clade: Angiosperms
- Clade: Eudicots
- Clade: Rosids
- Order: Rosales
- Family: Moraceae
- Genus: Ficus
- Subgenus: F. subg. Pharmacosycea
- Species: F. sodiroi

Binomial name
- Ficus sodiroi Rossberg

Synonyms
- Ficus lacunata Kvitvik; Ficus loxensis C.C.Berg

Species of fig tree from Ecuador

Ficus sodiroi is a species of flowering plant in the family Moraceae which is native to Ecuador and northern Peru. F. sodiroi is a free-standing tree which grows up to 25 m (82 ft) tall in wet forests in the Andes.

Ficus sodiroi is member of the subgenus Pharmacosycea. Members of this subgenus are free-standing trees. Most members of the other main Neotropical subgenus, Urostigma begin life as hemiepiphytes.

It grows in pluvial montane forest on the western slope of the Andes, 1800 to 2200 m (5900 to 6600 mft) above sea level. Under the synonym F. lacunata, the IUCN Red List classified the species as Vulnerable since is known from only three locations.

The species was first described by Günther Rossberg in 1937.

== Description ==
Ficus sodiroi trees grow up to 25 m (82 ft) tall. Its leaves range from roughly oval in shape to more narrow with a leathery texture. They range in length from 15 to 21 cm (6–8 in) and in width from 7–10.5 cm (3–4 in). The figs are borne singly on a short petiole up to 1.1 cm (0.4 in) long and are 2–2.9 cm (0.8–1.1 in) in diameter.
