= Ficus yoponensis =

Conservation status
- Least Concern (IUCN 3.1)

Scientific classification
- Kingdom: Plantae
- Clade: Tracheophytes
- Clade: Angiosperms
- Clade: Eudicots
- Clade: Rosids
- Order: Rosales
- Family: Moraceae
- Genus: Ficus
- Subgenus: F. subg. Pharmacosycea
- Species: F. yoponensis

Binomial name
- Ficus yoponensis Desv.

Synonyms
- Ficus finlayana Warb.; Ficus tobagensis Urb.

Species of fig tree from Central and South America

Ficus yoponensis is a species of fig tree native to Mexico, Central America, and northwestern South America. It can grow to heights of 40–50 metres (130–160 ft) tall, having a trunk diameter of 1 metre (3.3 ft). The trunk is buttressed, light grey in colour and reasonably smooth. Its petioles are 1–2.5 centimetres (0.39–0.98 in) long, the stipules are straight and 3–5 centimetres (1.2–2.0 in) long. The leaves and stems are hairless. The leaves are 6–11 centimetres (2.4–4.3 in) long and 2.5–4 centimetres (0.98–1.57 in) wide, but larger in juveniles, being up to 28 centimetres (11 in) long and 5 centimetres (2.0 in) wide. The time at which they flower varies between individuals, but each tree tends to flower at a similar time each year. As in all figs, the flowers are enclosed inside the fig and can only be accessed by fig wasps, which enter to pollinate the flowers and lay their own eggs. The resulting fruit grows to 1.8 centimetres (0.71 in) in diameter and turns from green to purple with maturity. On average in Panama, F. yoponensis produce a new flush of leaves every 20 weeks and flower every 25 weeks. The species is similar in appearance to Ficus insipida but has smaller leaves, stipules and fruits and only occurs in primary forest whereas F. insipida is also found in secondary forest.

== Distribution ==
Ficus yoponensis is native to central and southern Mexico, Central America, and Colombia, Venezuela, Ecuador and Peru in South America. It grows from sea level to 1,600 metres (5,200 ft) above sea level but is usually found between 500 and 1,200 metres (1,600 and 3,900 ft). Along with F. insipida it is one of the two most abundant species of fig tree found on Barro Colorado Island, Panama.

== Ecology ==
Ficus yoponensis is pollinated by the fig wasp Tetrapus ecuadoranus: 58% of figs are fertilised by only one female.

The fruits and leaves of F. yoponensis are eaten by several species. The fruits are eaten by bats, which then disperse their seeds. The stipules and fruits are collected by the leaf cutter ant, Atta colombica. The leaves and especially the fruit of F. yoponensis and F. insipida are a preferred food of howler monkeys (Alouatta palliata) in Panama, with one troop on Barro Colorado Island spending one quarter of its time feeding on these two tree species. Spider monkeys (Ateles geoffroyi) also feed on the leaves, which contain 11% protein and 4% sugars and remain similar in chemical composition throughout their lifespan, unlike most tree species. When fresh, the young leaves contain up to 585 mg of ascorbic acid (vitamin C) per 100 grams (3.5 oz) and the fruits contain 268 mg per 100 g. Like humans A. palliata and A. geoffroyi require vitamin C in their diet, since they do not possess the gene for L-gulonolactone oxidase, the enzyme required to convert glucose to ascorbic acid. The fruits of F. yoponensis contain more vitamin C than any other fruit available to the monkeys on Barro Colorado Island.

Various invertebrates live in water-filled holes into which leaf litter falls; as it decomposes it provides food for the animals. The leaves of F. yoponensis soften quickly after falling into the holes and are then eaten by Scirtid beetle larvae, leaving only a skeleton behind. An experiment in the rainforest, where leaves of F. yoponensis were added to an artificial pool containing 650 mL of water found that sixteen species lived in them, with the mosquito Culex mollis being the most abundant. Yanoviak found that the average volume of the holes was 0.3 litres (0.53 imp pt) and that they contained 67 individual animals.
