= Ficain =

Class of enzymes

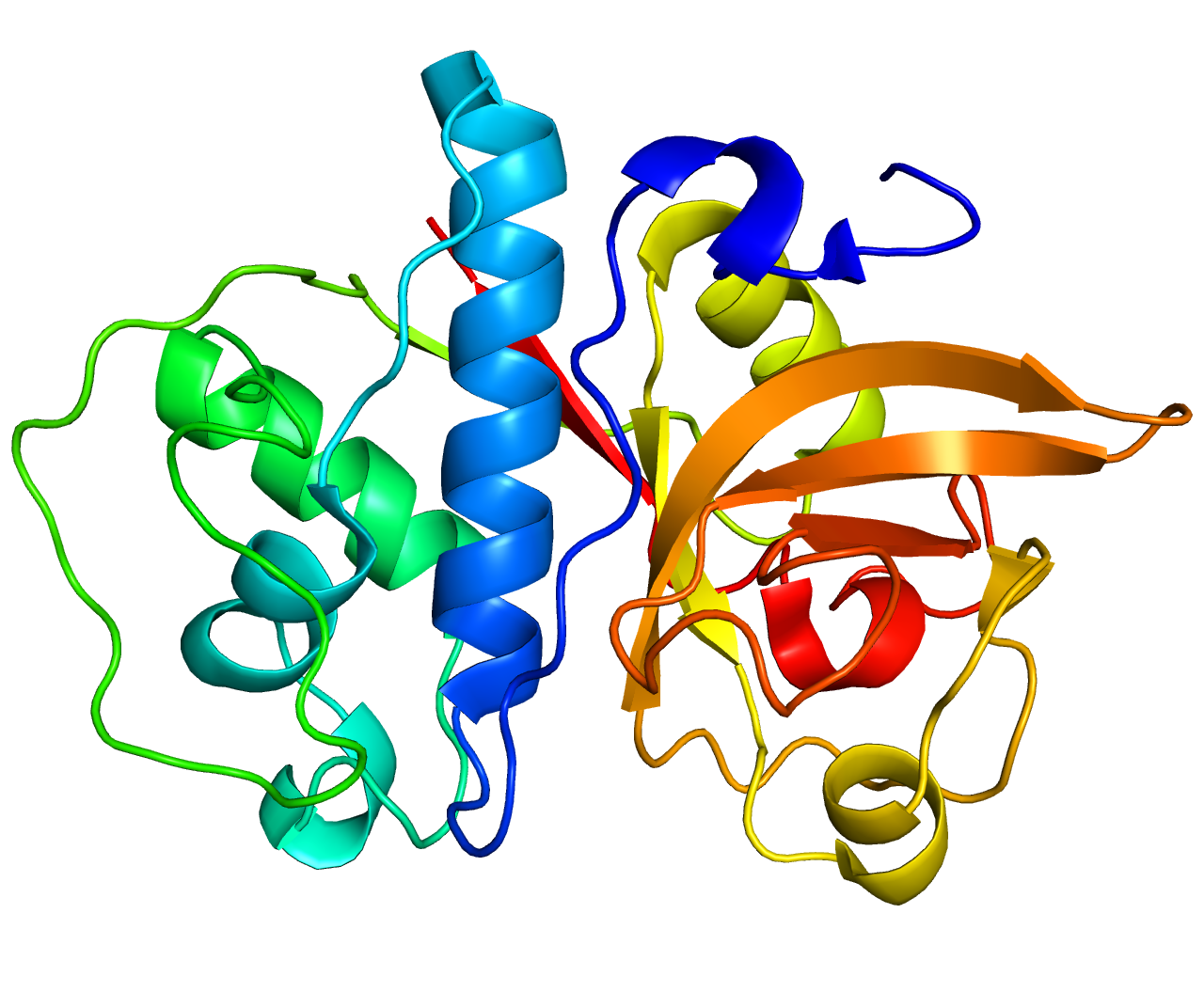
- Crystallographic structure of ficain from Ficus carica, rainbow colored, N-terminus blue, C-terminus red.

Identifiers
- EC no.: 3.4.22.3
- CAS no.: 9001-33-6

Databases
- IntEnz: IntEnz view
- BRENDA: BRENDA entry
- ExPASy: NiceZyme view
- KEGG: KEGG entry
- MetaCyc: metabolic pathway
- PRIAM: profile
- PDB structures: RCSB PDB PDBe PDBsum
Search
- PMC: articles
- PubMed: articles
- NCBI: proteins

Ficain also known as ficin, debricin, or higueroxyl delabarre (EC 3.4.22.3) is a proteolytic enzyme extracted from the latex sap from the stems, leaves, and unripe fruit of the American wild fig tree Ficus insipida.

Ficain was originally called ficin, and ficin was originally a mixture of closely related cysteine endopeptidases produced from any species of the genus Ficus, before the terminology was restricted to a specific cysteine endopeptidase enzyme from a specific species.

Cysteine endopeptidases are a group of enzymes that also include the more distantly related papain derived from papaya latex, bromelase (bromelain) extracted from pineapple stem, calpain, caspases, cathepsin B, and chymopapain. Cysteine endopeptidases with similar properties known generically as ficins are present in other members of the genus Ficus, and many species appear to contain multiple types of these enzymes. Somewhat confusingly, the terms ficain and ficin are often treated as synonyms.

Ficain is in the MEROPS clan CA, family C1, subfamily C1A, peptidase C01.006.

== Nomenclature ==
The name ficin was first used by Robbins in 1930 to describe a purified substance with anthelmintic activity isolated from any member of the fig genus. The Enzyme Commission of the International Union of Biochemistry and Molecular Biology (IUBMB) originally assigned EC 3.4.4.12 as ficin in 1961, which was transferred to 3.4.22.3 and renamed to ficain in 1972, making the two term synonymous at the time. Because the proteolytic enzymes from other members of the genus Ficus have not been fully characterized, the IUBMB in 1992 recommended the term ficain be restricted to the specific main proteolytic enzyme found in the ficin powder produced from F. glabrata, a taxon which has since been synonymised with F. insipida. However IUBMB Enzyme Nomenclature database continues to list ficin as a synonym of ficain and the two terms are often used interchangeably.

== Applications ==
Purified ficin is a white powder that was first produced in 1930. It was initially observed how intestinal nematodes dissolved in a ficin solution, which arose interest in the product at the time as an anthelmintic, although it was not widely adopted. Purified ficin is not actually 'pure', it is a mix of different enzymes and can be produced from many different species of Ficus. A commonly used ficin is made from the latex of the common fig and consists of a mixture of several isoforms. Up to ten different proteolytic enzymes were found in one study from that species alone, and it even appears that different cultivars of common fig contain different ratios of these enzymes. The milky sap of the common fig also contains furanocoumarins (psoralen), although oddly enough these are found chiefly in the sap of the leaves and shoots, but not in the sap of the fruits. One factor which may account for this is that psoralen and other furanocoumarins are primarily deterrents against herbivory, acting as photosensitizing agents to induce phytophotodermatitis. Psoralen's absence in fruit sap is consistent with the fact that the fruit of endozoochorous plants represents a relatively rare instance where herbivory is encouraged by the plant.

Although later research found it to be ineffective and potentially unhealthy as an anthelmintic, it later found numerous medical and industrial uses. It is used for cleaning in the production of stitching material for sutures, to prepare animal arteries before transplantation into humans, and for unmasking antigens in serology. It is one of the most commonly used substances for differentiating many blood group antigens: For example, it destroys M, N, S, Duffy a, and Duffy b, and enhances some other antigens including antigens from the Rh, Kidd, Lewis, I, and P1 systems.

It is also used for cleaning the animal intestines used as sausage or cheese-casings. It is used as an additive to make freeze-resistant beer, and has been added to certain formulations of meat tenderizers along with related protease-type enzymes. For example, as a tenderizer it can be added to the meat in the production of bologna sausage, which improves some measurable quality attributes of the final product. It can be used for dissolving the proteins in meat products in order to release potentially present food-borne pathogenic bacteria for safety analysis. Latex from Ficus carica also appears to contain an enzyme which shows marked ability to digest collagen, as opposed to papain. This, however, is not a cysteine protease, but a serine protease.

The crude, unrefined latex of F. insipida is also sold in North and South American as an anthelmintic herbal medicine called 'doctor oje' (ojé in Brazil). The crude latex is toxic, overdoses due to use as a medicine are possible and occur rarely, but it remains a popular drug in certain regions. During the 1940s the substance was known by medical practitioners as leche de higuerón, and it was considered to be the most effective treatment for trichuriasis at the time. Species used in the production of leche de higuerón in the 1920s included F. glaborata and F. laurifolia.
