= Ficus capillipes =

Conservation status
- Least Concern (IUCN 3.1)

Scientific classification
- Kingdom: Plantae
- Clade: Tracheophytes
- Clade: Angiosperms
- Clade: Eudicots
- Clade: Rosids
- Order: Rosales
- Family: Moraceae
- Tribe: Ficeae
- Genus: Ficus
- Subgenus: F. subg. Pharmacosycea
- Species: F. capillipes

Binomial name
- Ficus capillipes Gagnep.

Species of fig

Ficus capillipes is an Asian species of fig tree in the family Moraceae. No subspecies are listed in the Catalogue of Life; the native range of this species is Indo-China (the Andaman Islands, Cambodia, Thailand, and Vietnam) and Sumatra. In Vietnam it may be called ''đa cuống mãnh.
