= Ficus pulchella =

Conservation status
- Vulnerable (IUCN 2.3)

Scientific classification
- Kingdom: Plantae
- Clade: Tracheophytes
- Clade: Angiosperms
- Clade: Eudicots
- Clade: Rosids
- Order: Rosales
- Family: Moraceae
- Genus: Ficus
- Subgenus: F. subg. Pharmacosycea
- Species: F. pulchella

Binomial name
- Ficus pulchella Schott

Species of fig tree from South America

Ficus pulchella is a species of tree in the family Moraceae. It is native to South America.

== Conservation ==
It is considered a vulnerable species by the IUCN, as it is threatened by habitat loss.
