= Ficus mutabilis =

Conservation status
- Vulnerable (IUCN 2.3)

Scientific classification
- Kingdom: Plantae
- Clade: Tracheophytes
- Clade: Angiosperms
- Clade: Eudicots
- Clade: Rosids
- Order: Rosales
- Family: Moraceae
- Tribe: Ficeae
- Genus: Ficus
- Subgenus: F. subg. Pharmacosycea
- Species: F. mutabilis

Binomial name
- Ficus mutabilis Bureau

Synonyms
- Ficus mutabilis var. coriacea Bureau; Ficus mutabilis var. membranacea Bureau; Ficus mutabilis var. parvifolia Bureau

Species of fig from New Caledonia

Ficus mutabilis is a species of flowering plant in the family Moraceae. It is a tree endemic to New Caledonia.
