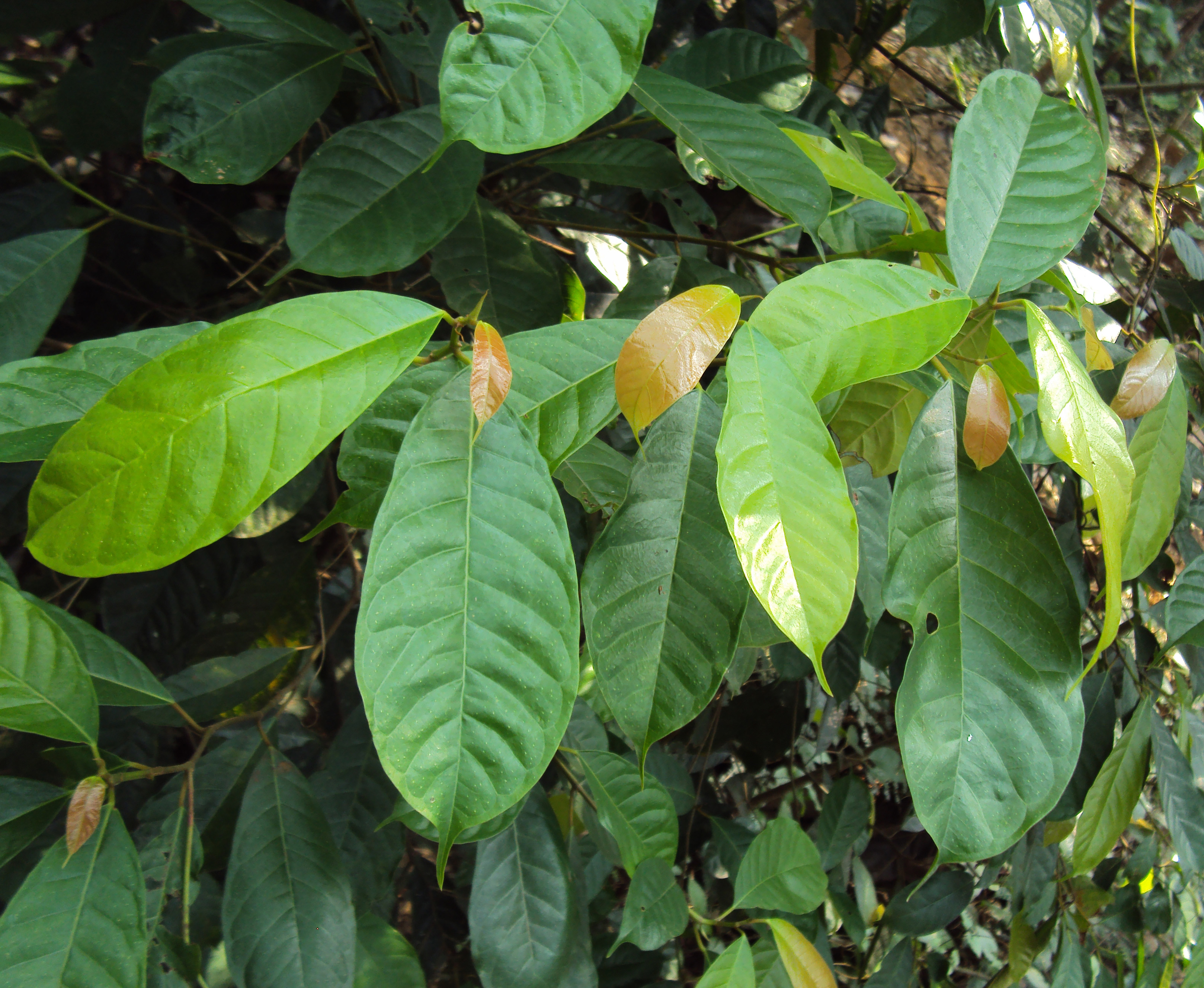
- Leaves and fruit (below)
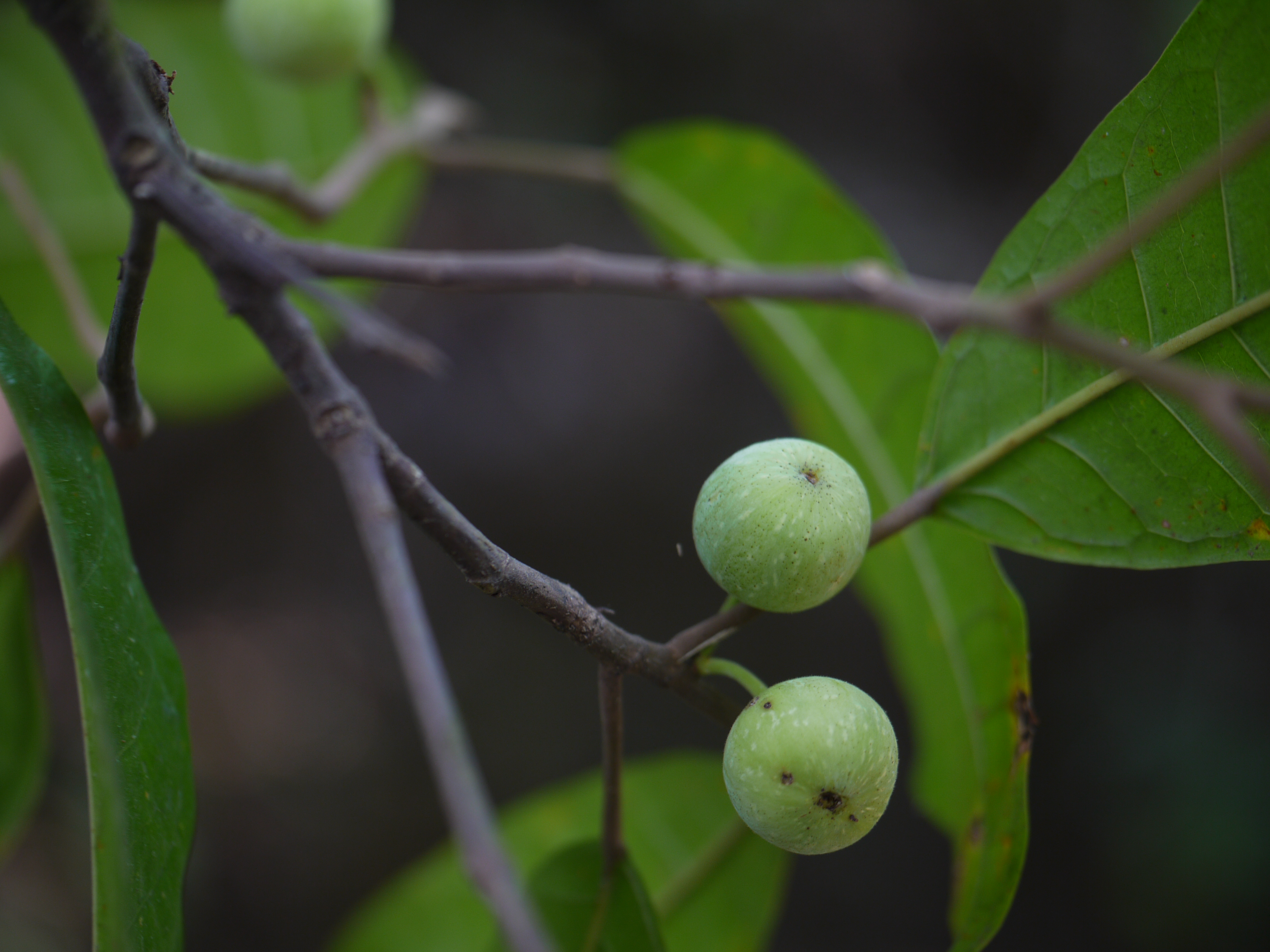

Conservation status
- Least Concern (IUCN 3.1)

Scientific classification
- Kingdom: Plantae
- Clade: Tracheophytes
- Clade: Angiosperms
- Clade: Eudicots
- Clade: Rosids
- Order: Rosales
- Family: Moraceae
- Tribe: Ficeae
- Genus: Ficus
- Subgenus: F. subg. Pharmacosycea
- Species: F. nervosa

Binomial name
- Ficus nervosa Roth

Subspecies
- Ficus nervosa subsp. minor (King) C.C.Berg; Ficus nervosa subsp. nervosa; Ficus nervosa subsp. pubinervis (Blume) C.C.Berg

Synonyms
- Synonymy: Urostigma nervosum (Roth) Miq. synonyms of subsp. minor: Ficus nervosa var. minor King; Urostigma modestum f. brevifolia Miq. synonyms of subsp. nervosa: Ficus blinii H.Lév. & Vaniot; Ficus bullata Roxb. ex Miq.; Ficus modesta (Miq.) Miq.; Ficus nervosa var. longifolia Sata; Ficus undulata Buch.-Ham.; Urostigma modestum Miq. synonyms of subsp. pubinervis: Ficus crassitora Elmer; Ficus cuneatonervosa Yamam.; Ficus decaisnei Steud.; Ficus pubinervis Blume (1825); Ficus pubinervis Decne. (1834), nom. illeg. homonym. post.; Ficus pubinervis var. cuneatonervosa (Yamam.) S.S.Ying; Ficus pubinervis var. diandra Corner; Ficus pubinervis f. sibulanensis (Elmer) Sata; Ficus pubinervis var. sibulanensis (Elmer) Corner; Ficus pubinervis var. teysmannii King; Ficus sibulanensis Elmer; Ficus similis Merr. (1906), non Ettingsh. (1887), fossil name.; Urostigma hasseltii Miq.

= Ficus nervosa =

Species of flowering plant

Ficus nervosa is a tree in the family Moraceae which grows up to a height of 35 metres. It is native to tropical Asia (the Indian subcontinent, Indochina, and Malesia), southern China, and Taiwan, where it grows in lowland tropical moist forests. The tree is grown in coffee plantations for shade.

== Subspecies ==
Plants of the World Online accepts three subspecies:

- Ficus nervosa subsp. minor (King) C.C.Berg – southern India and Sri Lanka
- Ficus nervosa subsp. nervosa – India, Sri Lanka, Bangladesh, central and eastern Himalayas, Indochina, southern China, and Taiwan
- Ficus nervosa subsp. pubinervis (Blume) C.C.Berg – Nicobar Islands, Sumatra, Borneo, Java, Lesser Sunda Islands, Philippines, Sulawesi, Maluku Islands, and Taiwan (Lan Yü and Lü Dao)
