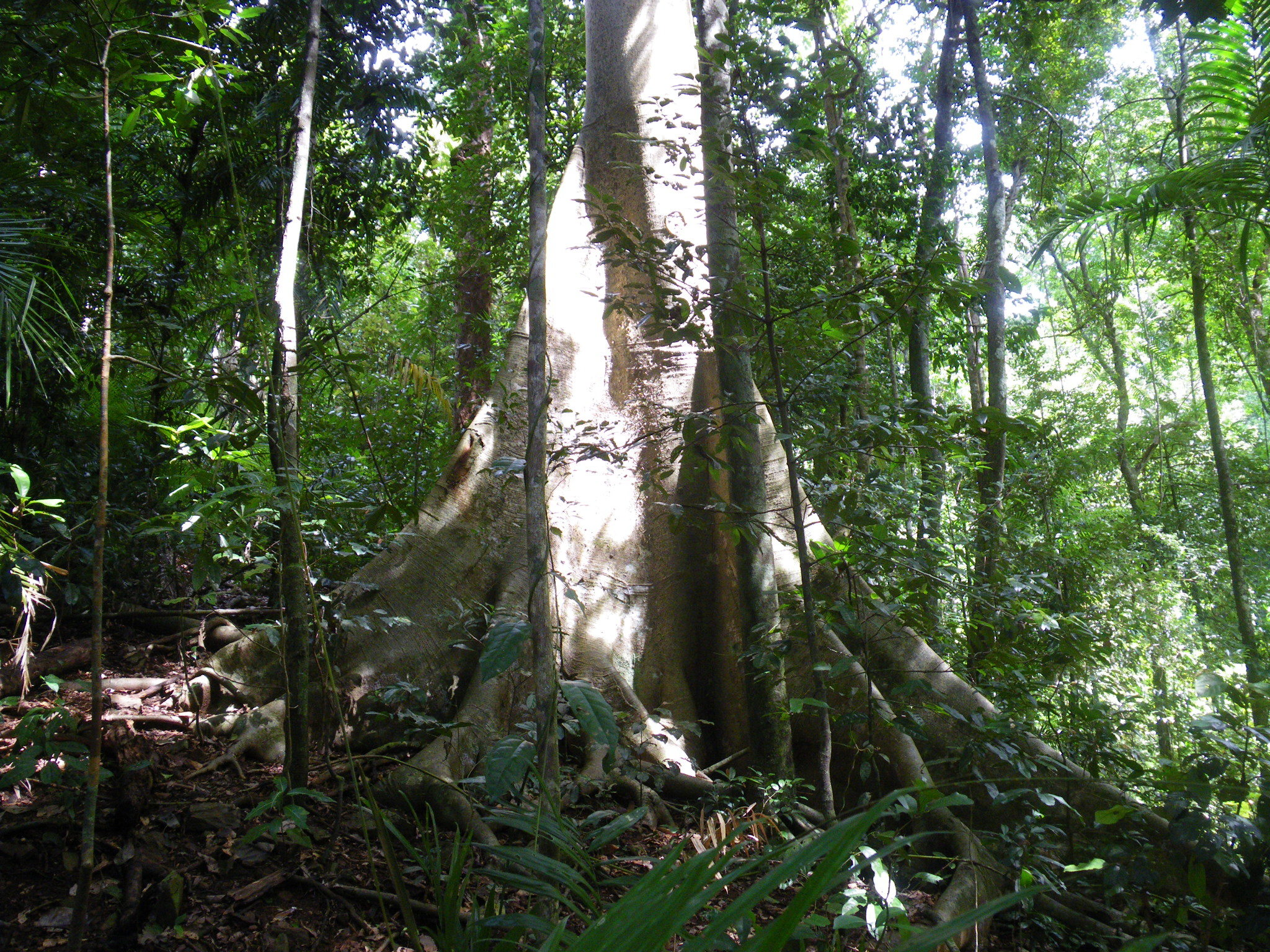
- Trunk
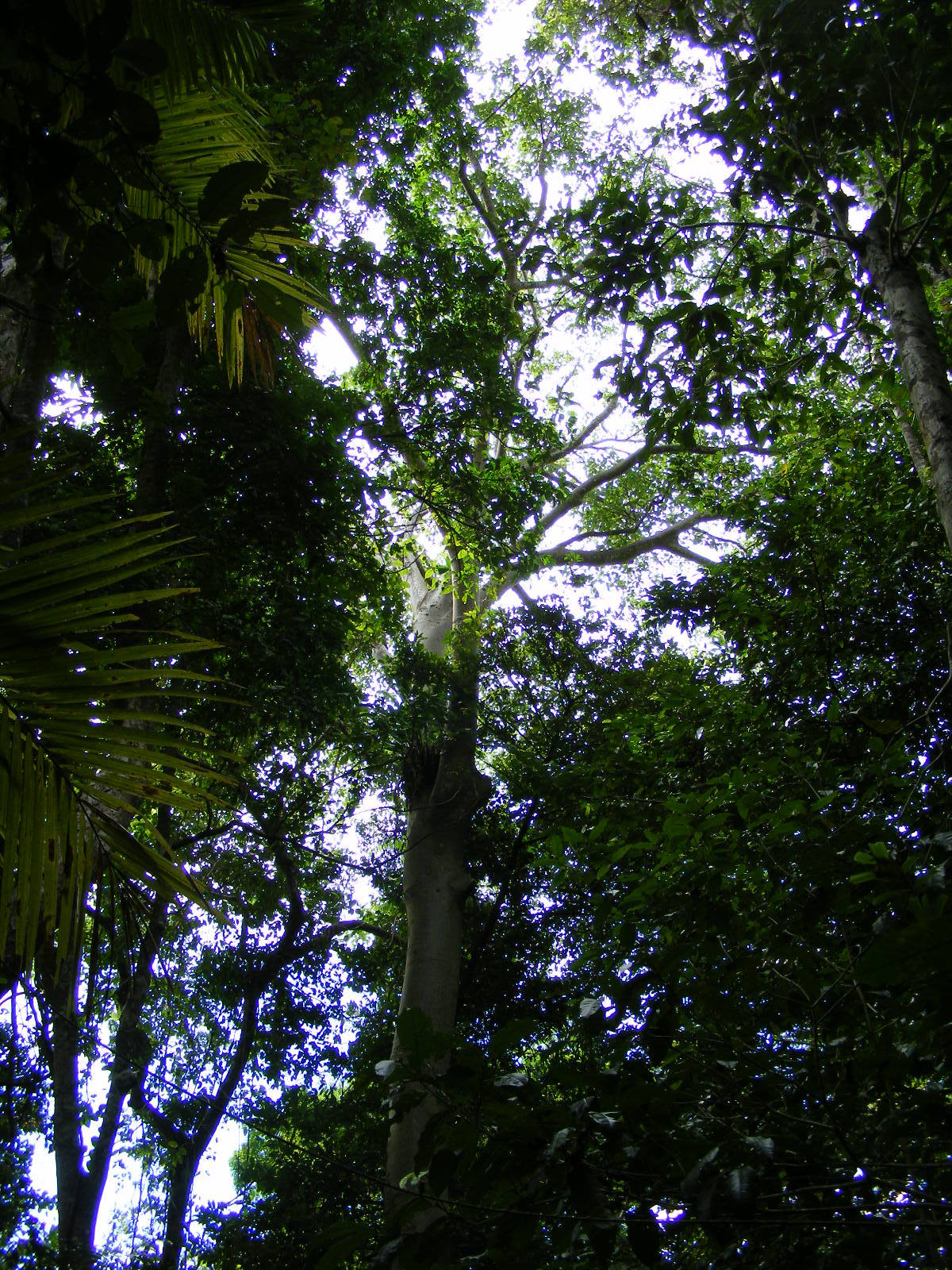
- Foliage

Conservation status
- Least Concern (IUCN 3.1)

Scientific classification
- Kingdom: Plantae
- Clade: Tracheophytes
- Clade: Angiosperms
- Clade: Eudicots
- Clade: Rosids
- Order: Rosales
- Family: Moraceae
- Genus: Ficus
- Species: F. albipila

Binomial name
- Ficus albipila (Miq.) King

Synonyms
- List: Covellia albipila Miq.; Ficus albipila var. glabra Corner; Ficus colossea F.Muell. ex Benth.; Ficus mallotoides Valeton ex Backer; Ficus microtricherinos Backer; Ficus mollis var. albipila (Miq.) Miq.; Morus leucophylla Miq.

= Ficus albipila =

Species of plant

Ficus albipila, the abbey tree, is a species of flowering plant in the family Moraceae, native to India, the Andaman and Nicobar Islands, Thailand, Peninsular Malaysia, Sumatra, Java, the Lesser Sunda Islands, New Guinea, Borneo, and Queensland, Australia, or more succinctly, Malesia. It is a widespread rainforest tree reaching 45 m (148 ft). It is also known as the abbey or poison fig, and sometimes the rocket fig. In Thailand, it is also called the bee fig, due to the fact that giant honeybees (Apis dorsata) often hang their hives from its branches. The tree is known to "have tall straight white trunks with large buttresses and are best identified by the (fallen) fruit and leaves." They have been known to live as high as 270 m (890 ft) of altitude. It can grow up to 25 m (82 ft) wide. It has a gray and green trunk, with leaves up to 14 cm (5.5 in) long and up to 10 cm (3.9 in) wide. The leaves taper to the tip, and are oval- or heart-shaped. Young shoots are known to have soft white hairs. The sap is a known skin irritant, but the fruit is edible.

== See also ==
- Phylum Ficus
