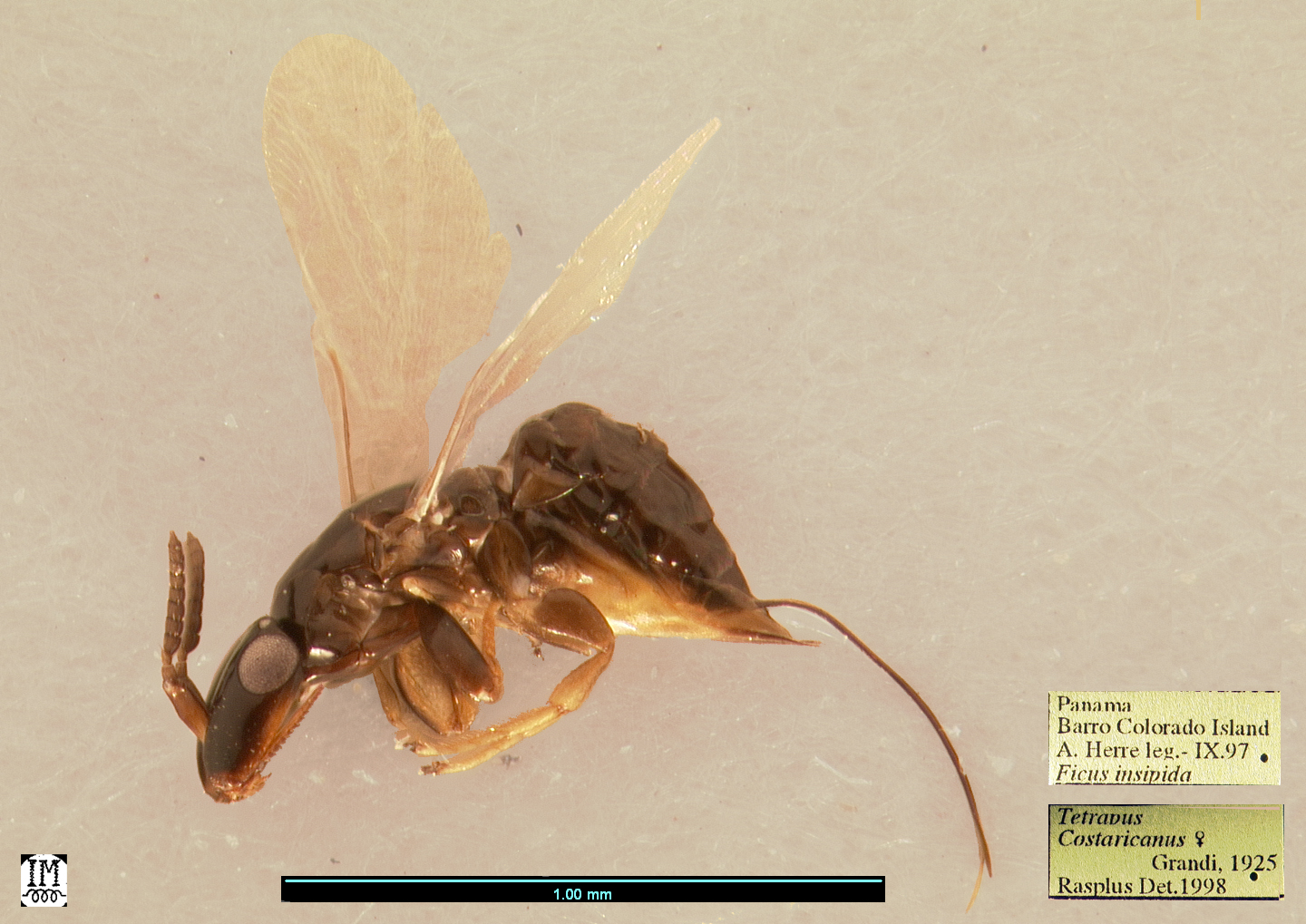
- Tetrapus costaricanus

Scientific classification
- Kingdom: Animalia
- Phylum: Arthropoda
- Clade: Pancrustacea
- Class: Insecta
- Order: Hymenoptera
- Family: Agaonidae
- Subfamily: Tetrapusiinae
- Genus: Tetrapus; Mayr, 1885

Type species
- Tetrapus americanus Mayr 1885

Species
- Tetrapus americanus Mayr; Tetrapus antillarum Ashmead; Tetrapus costaricanus Grandi; Tetrapus ecuadoranus Grandi; Tetrapus mayri Brues; Tetrapus mexicanus Grandi

= Tetrapus =

Genus of wasps

Tetrapus is a genus of fig wasp native to the Americas. Fig wasps have an obligate mutualism with the fig species they pollinate. Tetrapus pollinates figs in the subgenus Pharmacosycea.

Tetrapus appears to be the sole genus of the subfamily Tetrapusiinae and a basal clade among the fig-pollinating wasps.

The genus is estimated to be 87.5 million years old using cytochrome oxidase nucleotide sequences, and more than 34.5 million years old based on a fossil from Florissant, Colorado in the United States.
