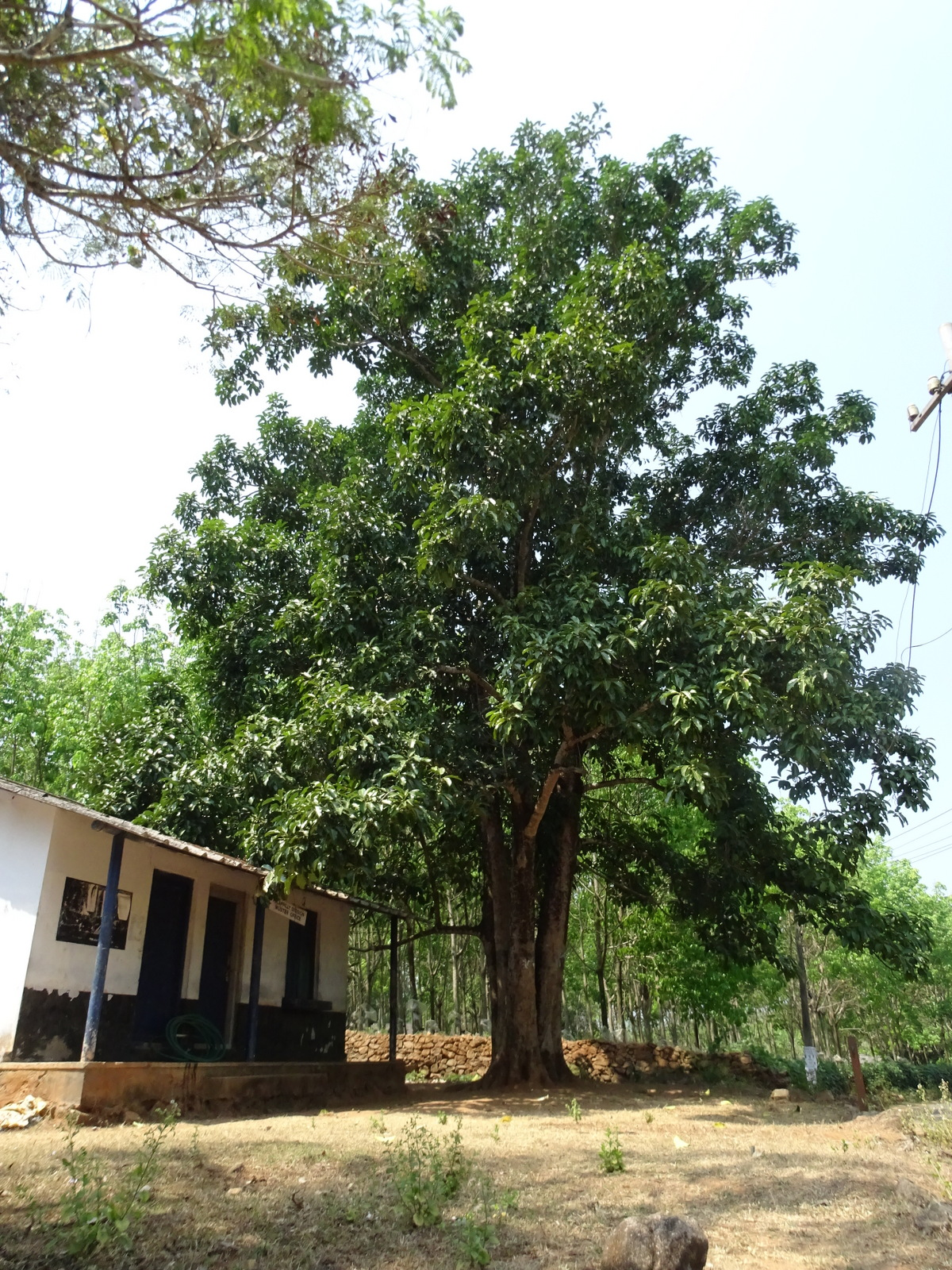
- Mature tree in Kerala, India

Conservation status
- Least Concern (IUCN 3.1)

Scientific classification
- Kingdom: Plantae
- Clade: Tracheophytes
- Clade: Angiosperms
- Clade: Eudicots
- Clade: Rosids
- Order: Rosales
- Family: Moraceae
- Genus: Ficus
- Subgenus: F. subg. Pharmacosycea
- Species: F. callosa

Binomial name
- Ficus callosa Willd.

Synonyms
- Ficus basidentula Miq.; Ficus cinerascens Thwaites; Ficus cordatifolia Elmer; Ficus longespathulata Sata; Ficus longespathulata var. elongatospathulata Sata; Ficus longespathulata var. grandifolia Sata; Ficus malunuensis Warb.; Ficus nobilis Lindl. ex André; Ficus porteana Regel; Ficus scleroptera Miq.

= Ficus callosa =

Species of fig

Ficus callosa is a species of tree in the family Moraceae native to India, southern China, Indo-China and Malesia. In Vietnam it may be called đa chai or đa gùa.

== Description ==
Ficus callosa is a tree up to about 35–45 m (115–148 ft) tall with a trunk to about 35 cm (14 in) diameter, and it may have large buttresses. The leaves of young plants are lobed and larger than those on older plants. They are shiny green above and paler below, with about 8–11 pairs of lateral veins. The syconia (fig fruit) are produced in the leaf axils either singly or in pairs, and are green-yellow when mature; they are somewhat pear-shaped and measure about 25 mm (1 in) long and 15 mm (0.6 in) wide. The species is dioecious, with female, male and gall flowers all present in the syconium.

== Gallery ==
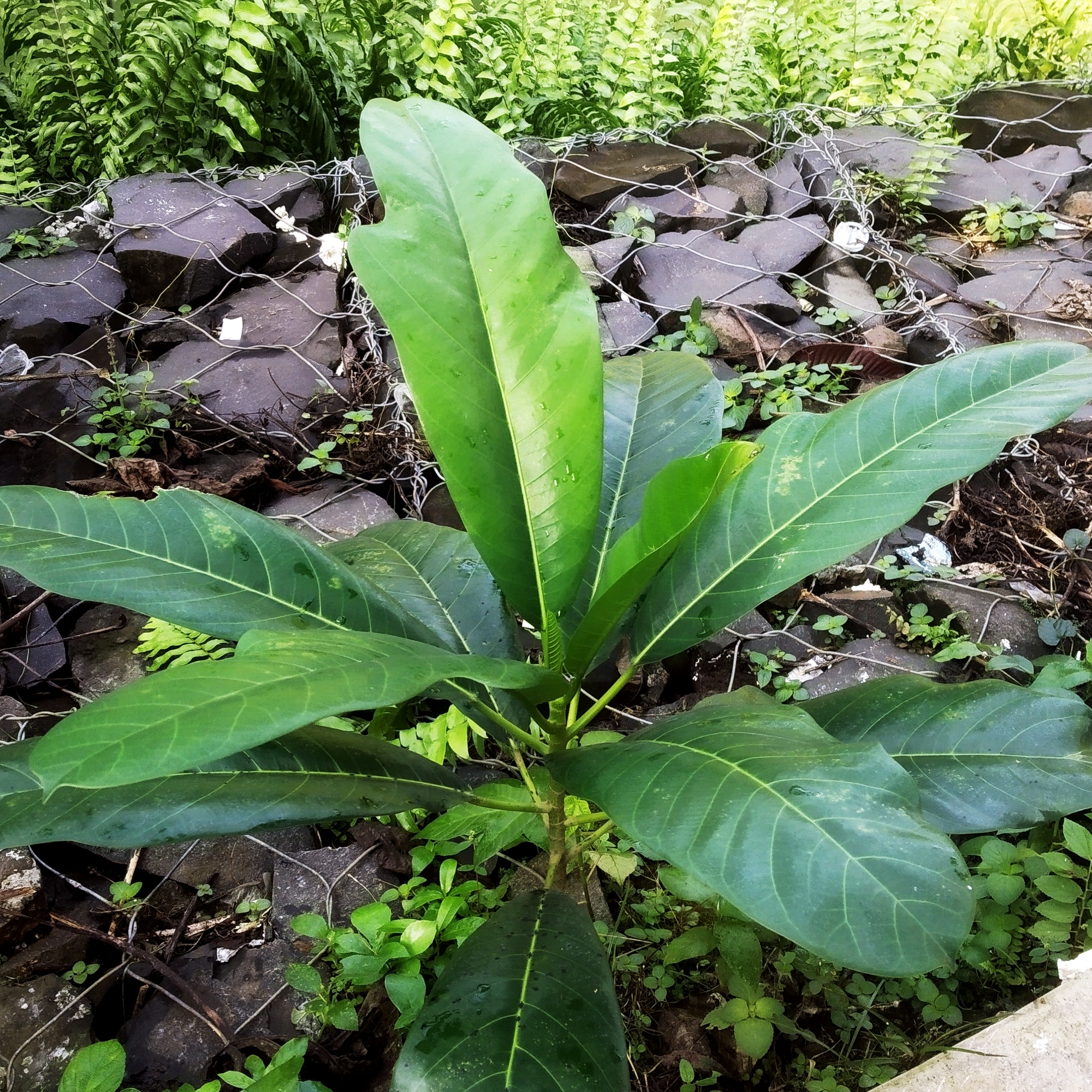
Juvenile foliage with lobed blades

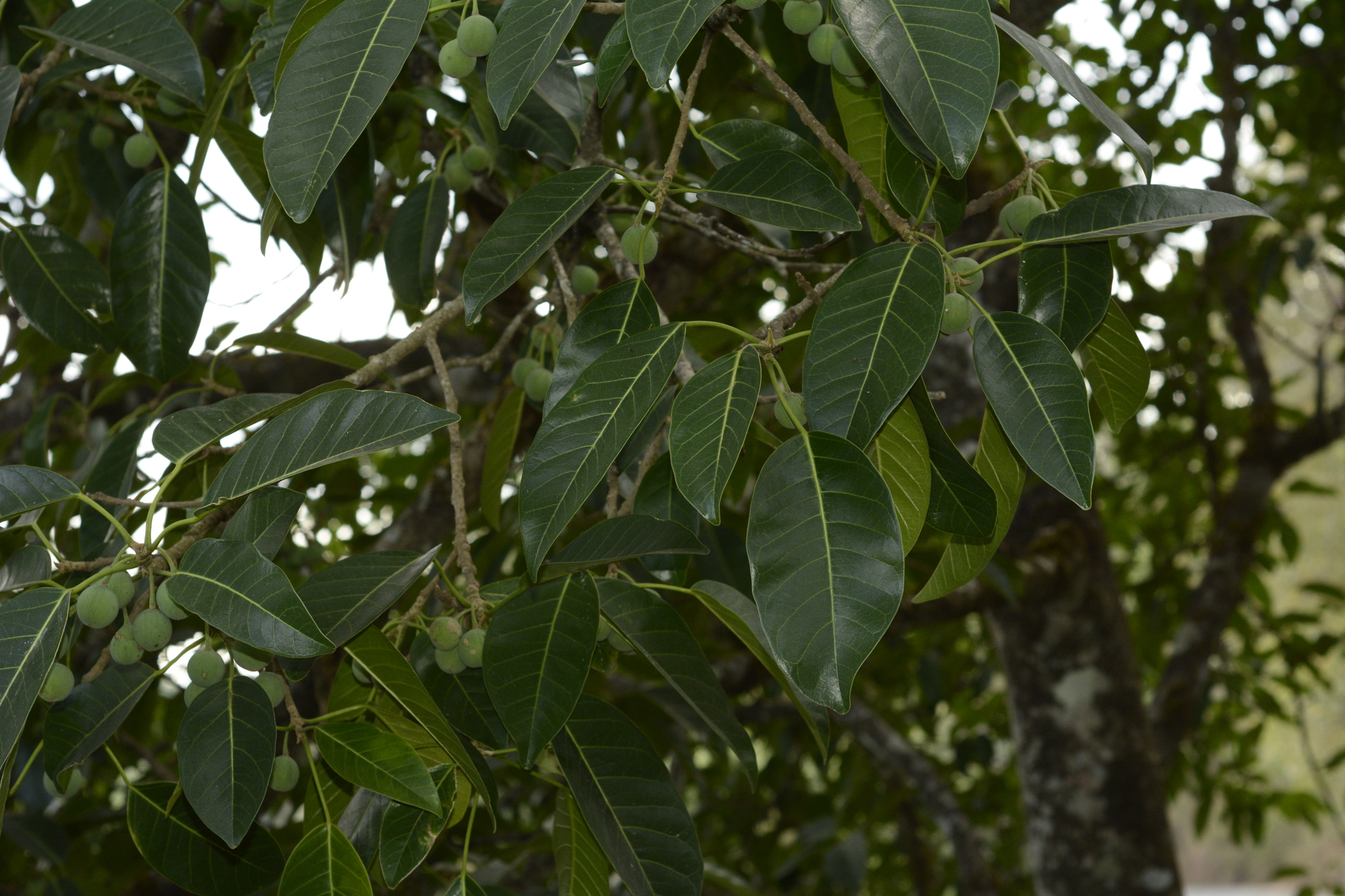
Foliage and fruit

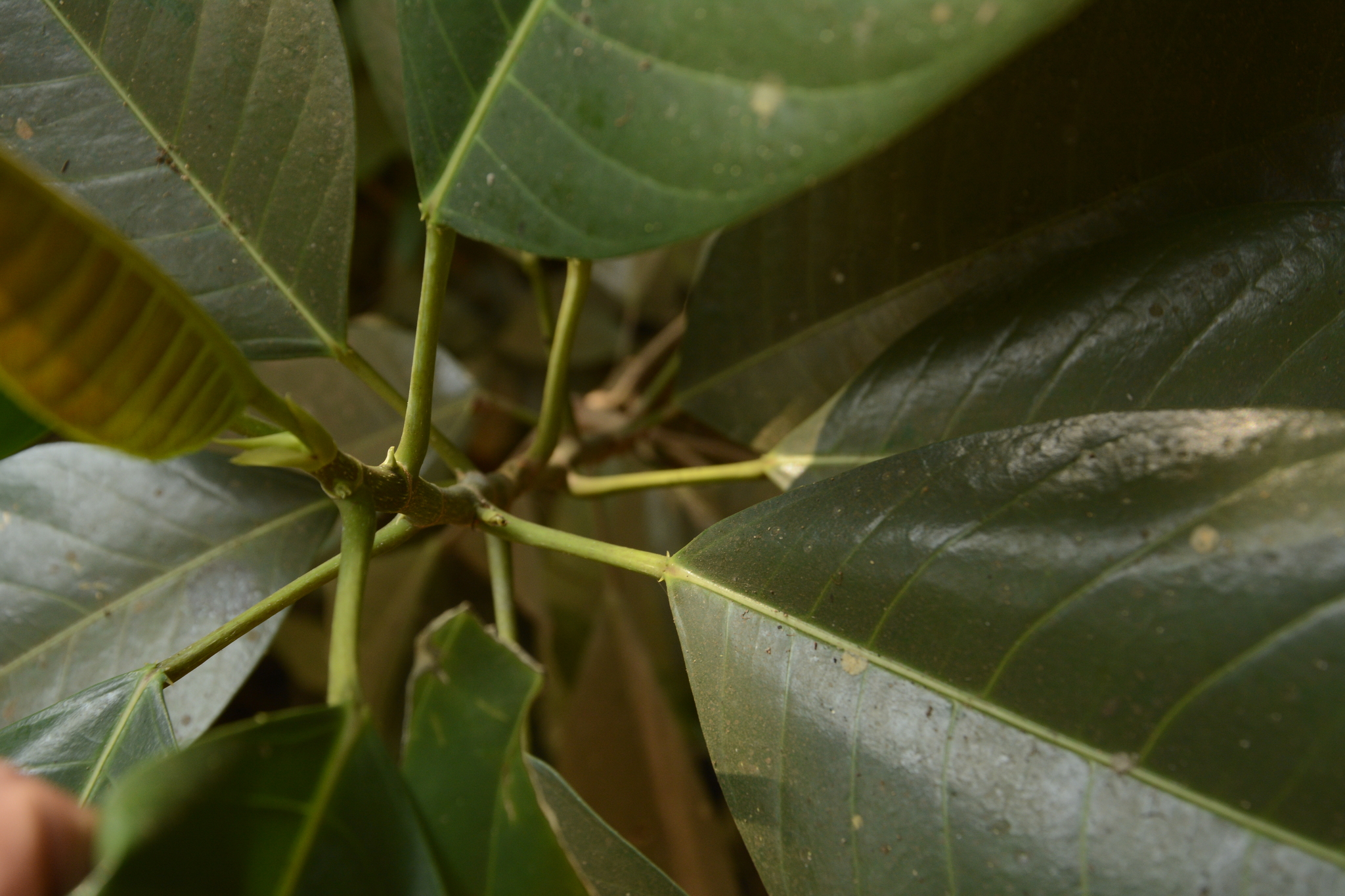
Petioles

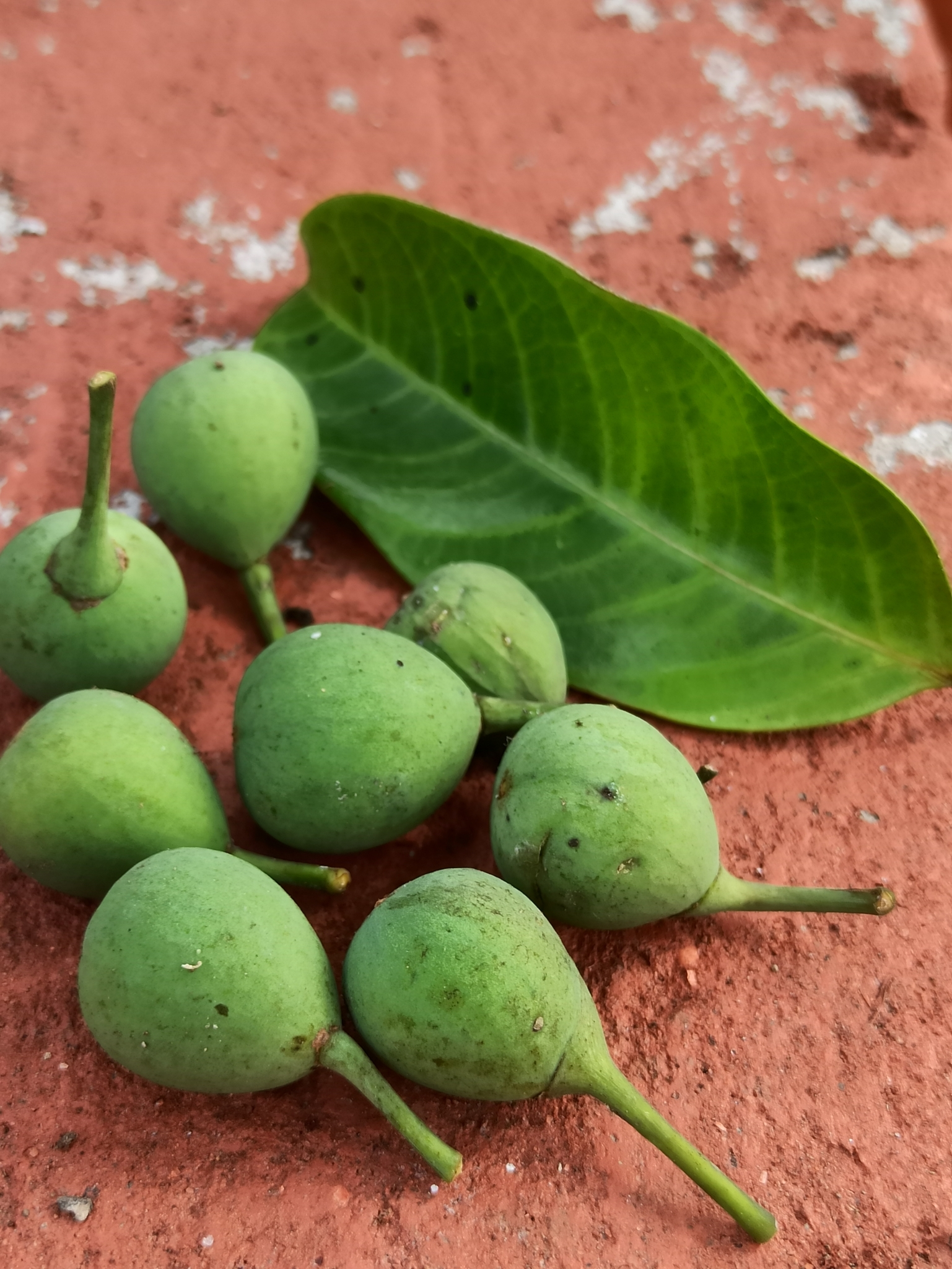
Mature fruit
