= Tetrapus americanus =

Scientific classification
- Domain: Eukaryota
- Kingdom: Animalia
- Phylum: Arthropoda
- Class: Insecta
- Order: Hymenoptera
- Family: Agaonidae
- Subfamily: Tetrapusiinae
- Genus: Tetrapus
- Species: T. americanus

Binomial name
- Tetrapus americanus Mayr

Species of wasp

Tetrapus americanus is a species of fig wasp which is native to South and Central America. It has an obligate mutualism with Ficus maxima, the fig species it pollinates.
