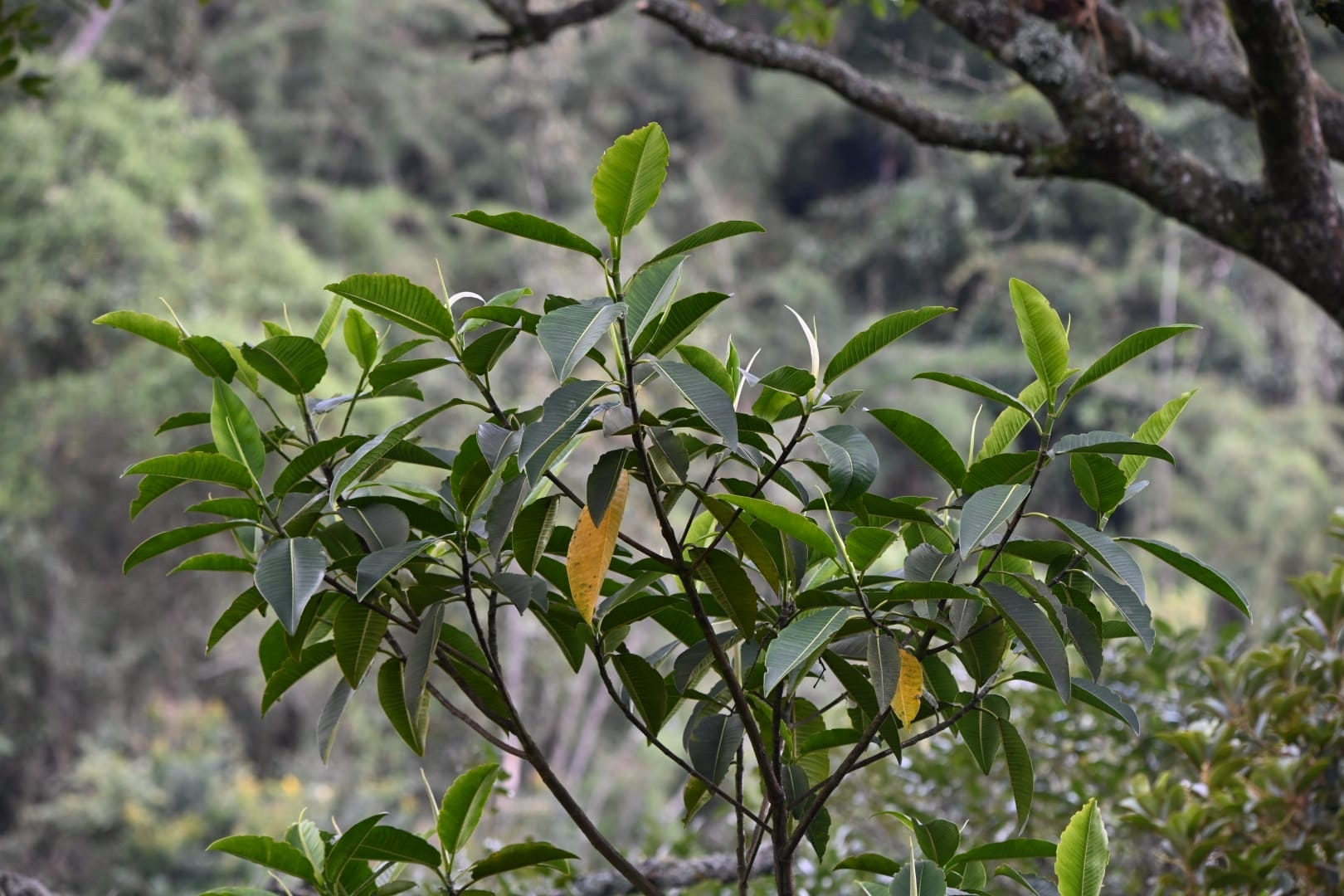

Conservation status
- Least Concern (IUCN 3.1)

Scientific classification
- Kingdom: Plantae
- Clade: Tracheophytes
- Clade: Angiosperms
- Clade: Eudicots
- Clade: Rosids
- Order: Rosales
- Family: Moraceae
- Genus: Ficus
- Subgenus: F. subg. Pharmacosycea
- Species: F. gigantosyce

Binomial name
- Ficus gigantosyce Dugand

= Ficus gigantosyce =

Species of fig tree from the Neotropics

Ficus gigantosyce, commonly known as higuerón, quiveche, or quivechi, is a species of flowering plant in the family Moraceae. It is a tree native to the Andes of Colombia, Ecuador, and Peru in western South America. It grows in montane tropical moist forest from 1950 to 2900 metres elevation.

The species was described by Armando Dugand in 1942.
