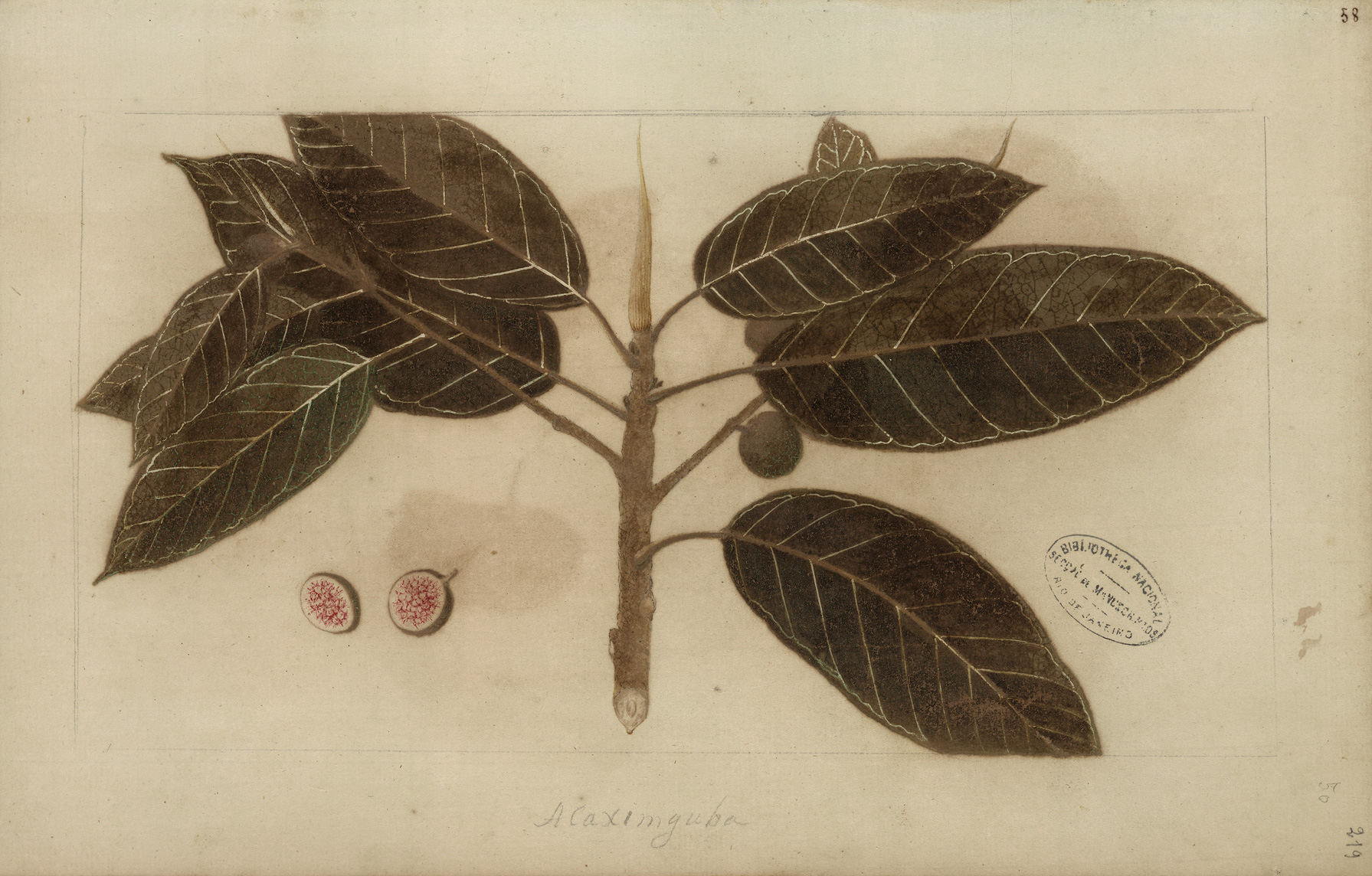

Scientific classification
- Kingdom: Plantae
- Clade: Tracheophytes
- Clade: Angiosperms
- Clade: Eudicots
- Clade: Rosids
- Order: Rosales
- Family: Moraceae
- Genus: Ficus
- Species: F. adhatodifolia

Binomial name
- Ficus adhatodifolia Schott

= Ficus adhatodifolia =

Species of plant

Ficus adhatodifolia is a species of plant of the Moraceae family, found in South America.

== Distribution ==
The species occurs in countries like Argentina, Bolivia, Brazil, and Paraguay.
