= Ficus lapathifolia =

Conservation status
- Least Concern (IUCN 3.1)

Scientific classification
- Kingdom: Plantae
- Clade: Tracheophytes
- Clade: Angiosperms
- Clade: Eudicots
- Clade: Rosids
- Order: Rosales
- Family: Moraceae
- Genus: Ficus
- Species: F. lapathifolia

Binomial name
- Ficus lapathifolia (Liebm.) Miq.

Synonyms
- Urostigma lapathifolium Liebm.

Species of fig

Ficus lapathifolia is a species of flowering plant in the family Moraceae. It is a tree native to Guatemala and central and southern Mexico. It can grow from 7 to 40 meters tall.

It is known from the Mexican states of Chiapas, Guerrero, Morelos, Oaxaca, Puebla, Tabasco, and Veracruz, where it grows in lowland evergreen rain forest and in montane pine forests, oak forests, and cloud forests from 30 to 1,300 meters elevation.

It is also found in the Jalisco dry forests ecoregion that extends along the Pacific coast of the states of Nayarit, Jalisco, and Colima where it forms part of the middle forest layer, growing to heights of 15 to 20 metres (49 to 66 ft).

The species was first described as Urostigma lapathifolium by Frederik Liebmann in 1851. In 1867 Friedrich Anton Wilhelm Miquel placed the species in genus Ficus as F. lapathifolia.
