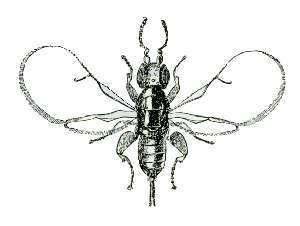
- Blastophaga psenes female

Scientific classification
- Kingdom: Animalia
- Phylum: Arthropoda
- Clade: Pancrustacea
- Class: Insecta
- Order: Hymenoptera
- Suborder: Apocrita
- Infraorder: Proctotrupomorpha
- Superfamily: Chalcidoidea

= Fig wasp =

Fig wasps

Group of mostly pollinating insects whose larvae live in figs

Fig wasps are wasps of the superfamily Chalcidoidea which spend their larval stage inside fig syconia. Some are pollinators but others simply feed off the plant. The non-pollinators belong to several groups within the superfamily Chalcidoidea, while the pollinators are in the family Agaonidae. Pollinating fig wasps are all gall-makers, while non-pollinating fig wasps either make their own galls or usurp the galls of other fig wasps. The lifestyles of these fig wasps rely on the fruit of fig trees to reproduce, with pollinating fig wasps acting as mutualists, and non-pollinating fig wasps as parasites.

== History ==
Aristotle recorded in his History of Animals that the fruits of the wild fig (the caprifig) contain psenes (fig wasps); these begin life as grubs (larvae), and the adult psen splits its "skin" (pupa) and flies out of the fig to find and enter a cultivated fig, saving it from dropping. He believed that the psen was generated spontaneously; he did not recognise that the fig was reproducing sexually and that the psen was assisting in that process.

== Taxonomy ==
The fig wasps are a polyphyletic group, including several lineages whose similarities are based upon their shared association with figs. In 2022, family Agaonidae was updated to include only the pollinating fig wasps under a single monophyletic clade. Other fig wasps are now included in the families Epichrysomallidae, Eurytomidae, Melanosomellidae, Ormyridae, Pteromalidae, and Torymidae. These non-pollinating fig wasps represent a much more diverse taxon, only distantly related to their pollinating cousins.

== Morphological adaptations ==
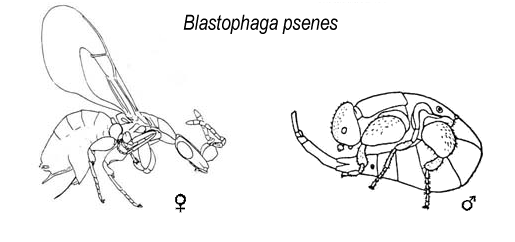
Female (left, with long ovipositor) and male Blastophaga psenes

In the Agaonidae, the female (as in most Hymenoptera) has four wings, whereas the males are wingless. The primary functions of agaonid males are to mate with the females while still within the fig syconium (inverted flower) and to chew a hole for the females to escape from the fig interior. This is the reverse of sex-linked functions in Strepsiptera and bagworms, where the male has wings and the female never leaves the host.

The non-pollinating fig wasps have developed several impressive morphological adaptations in order to oviposit eggs within the fig syconium. Many species have extremely long ovipositors, so that they can deposit eggs from the outside of the syconium (Subtribe Sycoryctina of Otitesellini and Subfamily Sycophaginae). Others have evolved to enter the syconium in the same way as the Agaonidae, and now resemble the pollinators morphologically (Subtribe Sycoecina of Otitesellini). Less is known about the evolution of non-pollinating fig wasps who form different clades from various lineages, each independently colonized the syconium. These wasps work around the mutualistic relationship, exploiting fig fruits as parasites.

Most figs (more than 600 species) have syconia that contain three types of flowers: male, short female, and long female. Female fig wasps can reach the ovaries of short female flowers with their ovipositors, but not long female flowers. Thus, the short female flowers grow wasps, and the long flowers only seeds. Contrary to popular belief, ripe figs are not full of dead wasps and the "crunchy bits" in the fruit are only seeds. The fig actually produces an enzyme called ficain (also known as ficin) which digests the dead wasps and the fig absorbs the nutrients to create the ripe fruits and seeds. Several commercial and ornamental varieties of fig are parthenocarpic and do not require pollination to produce (sterile) fruits; these varieties need not be visited by fig wasps to bear fruit.

== Life cycle ==
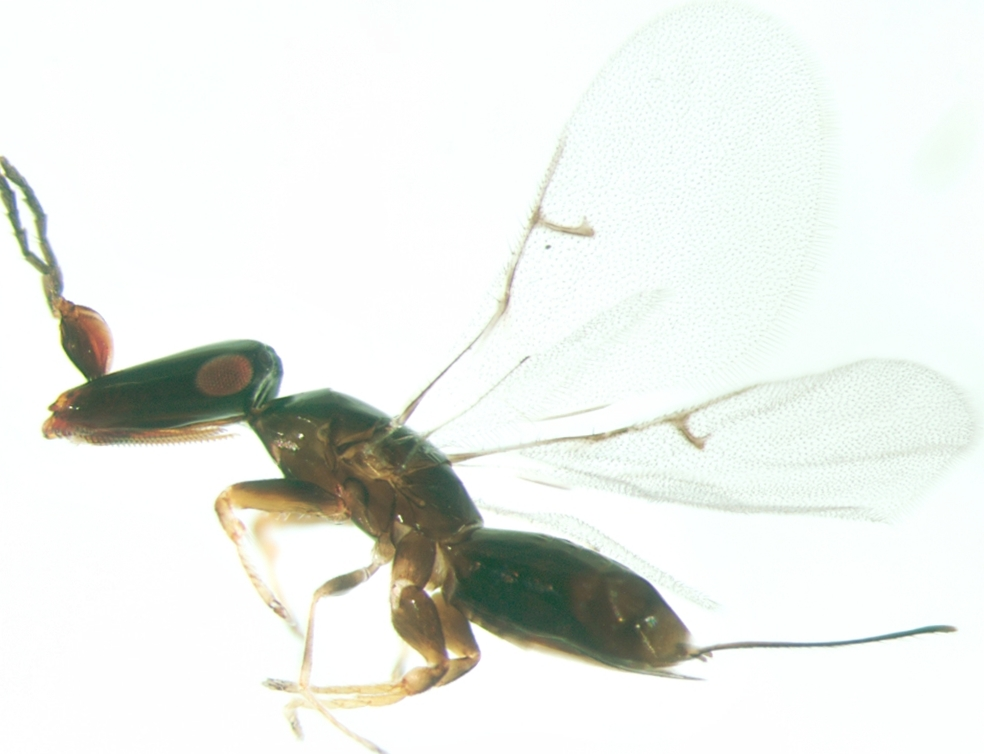
Pleistodontes sp. female

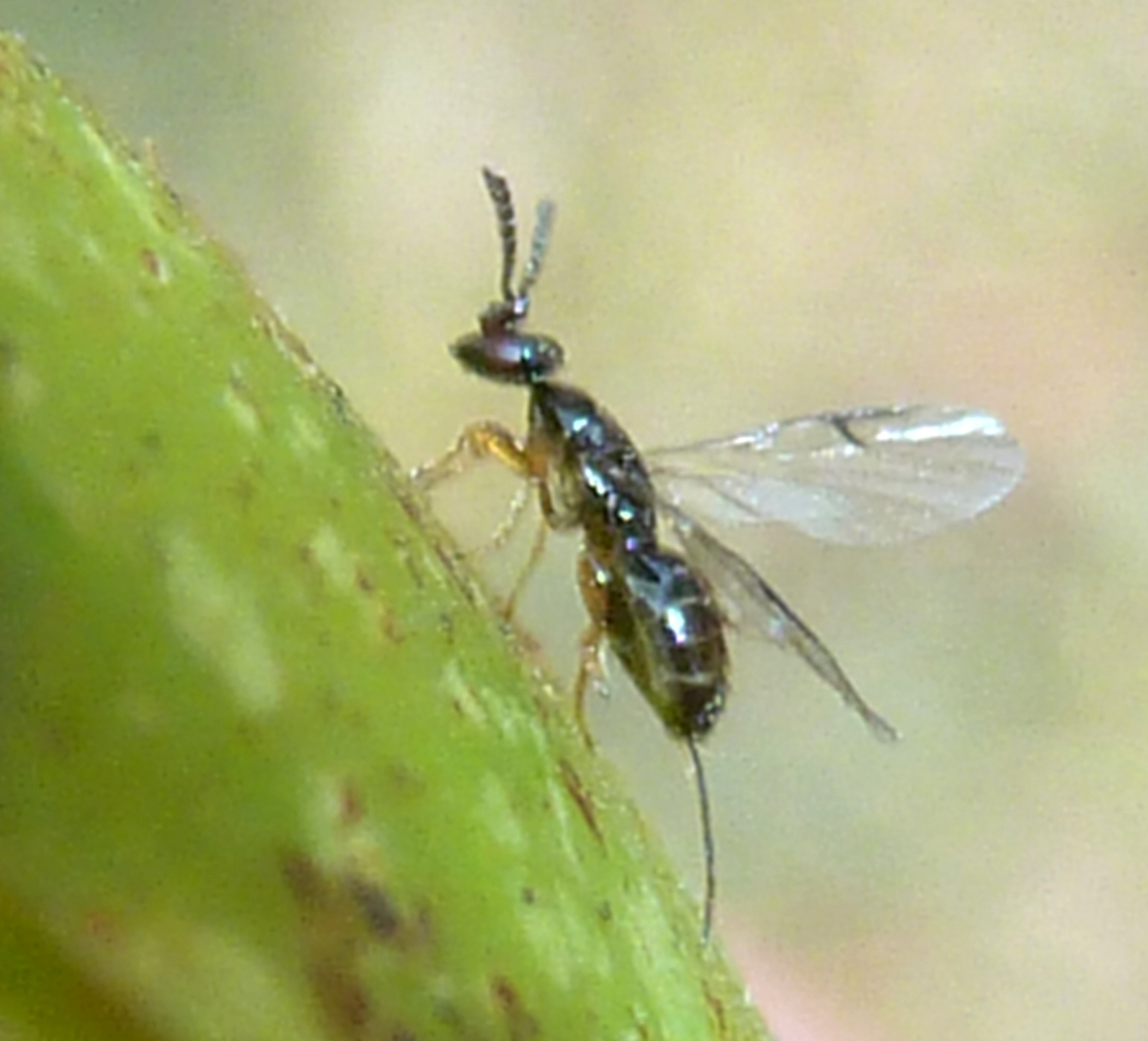
Ceratosolen species are pollinators of the Sycomorus, Sycocarpus and Neomorphe sections of Ficus.

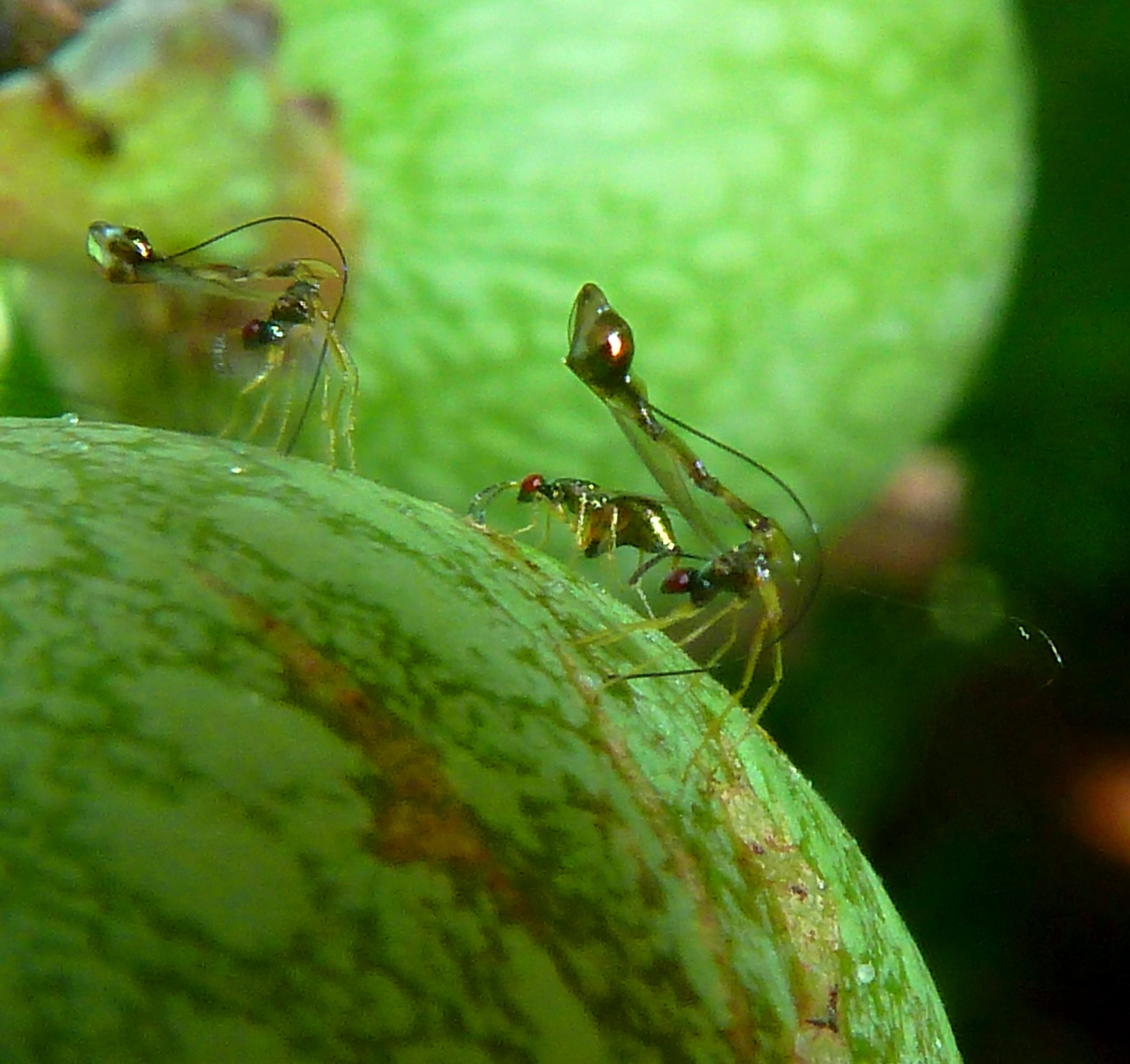
Non-pollinating parasitoid wasps Apocrypta ovipositing on Ficus sur in South Africa

The life cycle of the fig wasp is closely intertwined with that of the fig tree it inhabits. The wasps that inhabit a particular tree can be divided into two groups; pollinating and non-pollinating. The pollinating wasps are part of an obligate nursery pollination mutualism with the fig tree, while the non-pollinating wasps feed off the plant without benefiting it. The life cycles of the two groups, however, are similar.

Though the lives of individual species differ, a typical pollinating fig wasp life cycle is as follows. At the beginning of the cycle, a mated mature female pollinator wasp enters the immature "fruit" (actually a stem-like structure known as a syconium) through a small natural opening (the ostiole) and deposits her eggs in the cavity.

Forcing her way through the ostiole, the mated mature female often loses her wings and most of her antennae. To facilitate her passage through the ostiole, the underside of the female's head is covered with short spines that provide purchase on the walls of the ostiole.

In depositing her eggs, the female also deposits pollen she picked up from her original host fig. This pollinates some of the female flowers on the inside surface of the fig and allows them to mature. After the female wasp lays her eggs and follows through with pollination, she dies.

After pollination, there are several species of non-pollinating wasps that deposit their eggs before the figs harden. These wasps act as parasites to either the fig or possibly the pollinating wasps.

As the fig develops, the wasp eggs hatch and develop into larvae. After going through the pupal stage, the mature male’s first act is to mate with a female - before the female hatches. Consequently, the female will emerge pregnant. The males of many species lack wings and cannot survive outside the fig for a sustained period of time. After mating, a male wasp begins to dig out of the fig, creating a tunnel through which the females escape.

Once out of the fig, the male wasps quickly die. The females find their way out, picking up pollen as they do. They then fly to another tree of the same species, where they deposit their eggs and allow the cycle to begin again.

== Coevolution ==
The fig–wasp mutualism originated between 70 and 90 million years ago as the product of a unique evolutionary event. Since then, cocladogenesis and coadaptation on a coarse scale between wasp genera and fig sections have been demonstrated by both morphological and molecular studies. This illustrates the tendency towards coradiation of figs and wasps. Such strict cospeciation should result in identical phylogenetic trees for the two lineages and recent work mapping fig sections onto molecular phylogenies of wasp genera and performing statistical comparisons has provided strong evidence for cospeciation at that scale.

Groups of genetically well-defined pollinator wasp species coevolve in association with groups of genetically poorly defined figs. The constant hybridization of the figs promotes the constant evolution of new pollinator wasp species. Host switching and pollinator host sharing may contribute to the incredible diversity of figs and fig wasp species like Pegoscapus as they result in hybridization and introgression.

== Conservation ==
Conservation efforts aim to control the populations often times targeting figs and fig wasps separately in order to develop strategies that are distinct for each species. Because many of these mutualist interactions are species specific it makes it difficult for conservationists to focus on the group at large, rather tackling individual populations with high concern. There is already heavily studied control mechanisms in figs that control for wasp populations. The current focus in the field is the conservation of fig wasp species as the role of pollinators is steadily declining with climate change. Because many of these species have coevolved together through generations the main aim of conservation strategies is that protection of one species in the mutualism in turn affects the other, so by developing strategies to protect threatened wasp populations, the species of fig associated with it will also be impacted.

Many figs are also keystone species in their environment, being food sources and homes for a wide range of species. Fig wasps are obligate mutualists with their respective fig species, not being able to survive without each other. The loss of a pollinator wasp would result in the decline of a fig species, resulting in the general decline in the habitat. These reasons are why fig wasps have become a main focus among conservationists with the aim of protecting crucial keystone fig species.

== Genera ==
Fig wasp genera and classification:

- Agaonidae
  - Agaoninae
    - Agaon
    - Alfonsiella
    - Allotriozoon
    - Blastophaga
    - Courtella
    - Deilagaon
    - Dolichoris
    - Elisabethiella
    - Eupristina
    - Nigeriella
    - Paragaon
    - Pegoscapus
    - Platyscapa
    - Pleistodontes
    - Waterstoniella
    - Wiebesia
  - Kradibiinae
    - Ceratosolen
    - Kradibia
  - Tetrapusiinae
    - Tetrapus
- Epichrysomallidae
  - Acophila
  - Asycobia
  - Camarothorax
  - Epichrysomalla
  - Eufroggattia
  - Herodotia
  - Josephiella
  - Lachaisea
  - Meselatus
  - Neosycophila
  - Odontofroggatia
  - Parapilkhanivora
  - Sycobia
  - Sycobiomorphella
  - Sycomacophila
  - Sycophilodes
  - Sycophilomorpha
  - Sycotetra
- Eulophidae
  - Paphagus
- Eurytomidae
  - Eurytoma
  - Ficomila
  - Syceurytoma
  - Sycophila
- Melanosomellidae
  - Hansonita
- Ormyridae
  - Ormyrus
- Pteromalidae
  - Colotrechinae
    - Podvina
  - Pteromalinae
    - Pteromalini
      - Aepocerus
      - Critogaster
      - Ficicola
      - Heterandrium
    - Otitesellini
      - Otitesellina
        - Comptoniella
        - Eujacobsonia
        - Gaudalia
        - Grandiana
        - Grasseiana
        - Lipothymus
        - Marginalia
        - Micranisa
        - Micrognathophora
        - Otitesella
        - Philosycus
        - Philosycella
        - Walkerella
      - Sycoecina
        - Crossogaster
        - Diaziella
        - Robertsia
        - Seres
        - Sycoecus
      - Sycoryctina
        - Adiyodiella
        - Apocrypta
        - Arachonia
        - Bouceka
        - Dobunabaa
        - Parasycobia
        - Philotrypesis
        - Philoverdance
        - Sycorycteridea
        - Sycoryctes
        - Sycoscapter
        - Sycoscapteridea
        - Watshamiella
  - Sycophaginae
    - Anidarnes
    - Conidarnes
    - Eukoebelea
    - Idarnes
    - Pseudidarnes
    - Sycophaga
- Torymidae
  - Megastigmus
  - Physothorax
  - Torymus

== Museum collections ==
One of the world's major fig wasp collections resides in Leeds Museums and Galleries' Discovery Centre, and was collected by Dr. Steve Compton.

== Sources ==
- Cook, James M.; Rasplus, Jean-Yves (May 2003). "Mutualists with attitude: coevolving fig wasps and figs" (PDF). Trends in Ecology & Evolution. 18 (5): 241–8. doi:10.1016/S0169-5347(03)00062-4.
- Cruaud, Astrid; et al. (August 2010). "Laying the foundations for a new classification of Agaonidae (Hymenoptera: Chalcidoidea), a multilocus phylogenetic approach". Cladistics. 26 (4): 359–87. doi:10.1111/j.1096-0031.2009.00291.x. PMID 34875808. S2CID 85436401.
- Cruaud, Astrid; et al. (June 2011). "Phylogeny and evolution of life-history strategies in the Sycophaginae non-pollinating fig wasps (Hymenoptera, Chalcidoidea)". BMC Evolutionary Biology. 11 (1): 178. Bibcode:2011BMCEE..11..178C. doi:10.1186/1471-2148-11-178. PMC 3145598. PMID 21696591.
- Heraty, John M.; Burks, Roger A.; Cruaud, A; Gibson, Gary A P; Liljeblad, Johan; Munro, James; Rasplus, Jean-Yves; Delvare, Gerard; Janšta, Peter; Gumovsky, Alex; Huber, John; Woolley, James B.; Krogmann, Lars; Heydon, Steve; Polaszek, Andrew; Schmidt, Stefan; Darling, D. Chris; Gates, Michael W.; Mottern, Jason; Murray, Elizabeth; Dal Molin, Ana; Triapitsyn, Serguei; Baur, Hannes; Pinto, John D.; van Noort, Simon; George, Jeremiah; Yoder, Matthew (October 2013). "A phylogenetic analysis of the megadiverse Chalcidoidea (Hymenoptera)". Cladistics. 29 (5): 466–542. doi:10.1111/cla.12006. PMID 34798768. S2CID 86061702.
- Machado, Carlos A.; Robbins, Nancy; Gilbert, M. Thomas P.; Herre, Edward Allen (April 2005). "Critical review of host specificity and its coevolutionary implications in the fig-fig-wasp mutualism" (PDF). Proceedings of the National Academy of Sciences of the United States of America. 102 (Suppl 1): 6558–65. Bibcode:2005PNAS..102.6558M. doi:10.1073/pnas.0501840102. PMC 1131861. PMID 15851680.
- Machado, Carlos A.; Jousselin, Emmanuelle; Kjellberg, Finn; Compton, Stephen G.; Herre, Edward Allen (April 7, 2001). "Phylogenetic relationships, historical biogeography and character evolution of fig-pollinating wasps". Proceedings of the Royal Society B: Biological Sciences. 268 (1468): 685–94. doi:10.1098/rspb.2000.1418. PMC 1088657. PMID 11321056.
- Molbo, Drude; Machado, Carlos A.; Sevenster, Jan G.; Keller, Laurent; Herre, Edward Allen (May 13, 2003). "Cryptic species of fig-pollinating wasps: implications for the evolution of the fig-wasp mutualism, sex allocation, and precision of adaptation" (PDF). Proceedings of the National Academy of Sciences of the United States of America. 100 (10): 5867–72. Bibcode:2003PNAS..100.5867M. doi:10.1073/pnas.0930903100. PMC 156293. PMID 12714682.
- Rasplus, Jean-Yves; Kerdelhué, Carole; Le Clainche, Isabelle; Mondor, Guénaëlle (June 1998). "Molecular phylogeny of fig wasps Agaonidae are not monophyletic". Comptes Rendus de l'Académie des Sciences, Série III. 321 (6): 517–26. Bibcode:1998CRASG.321..517R. doi:10.1016/s0764-4469(98)80784-1. PMID 9841095.
