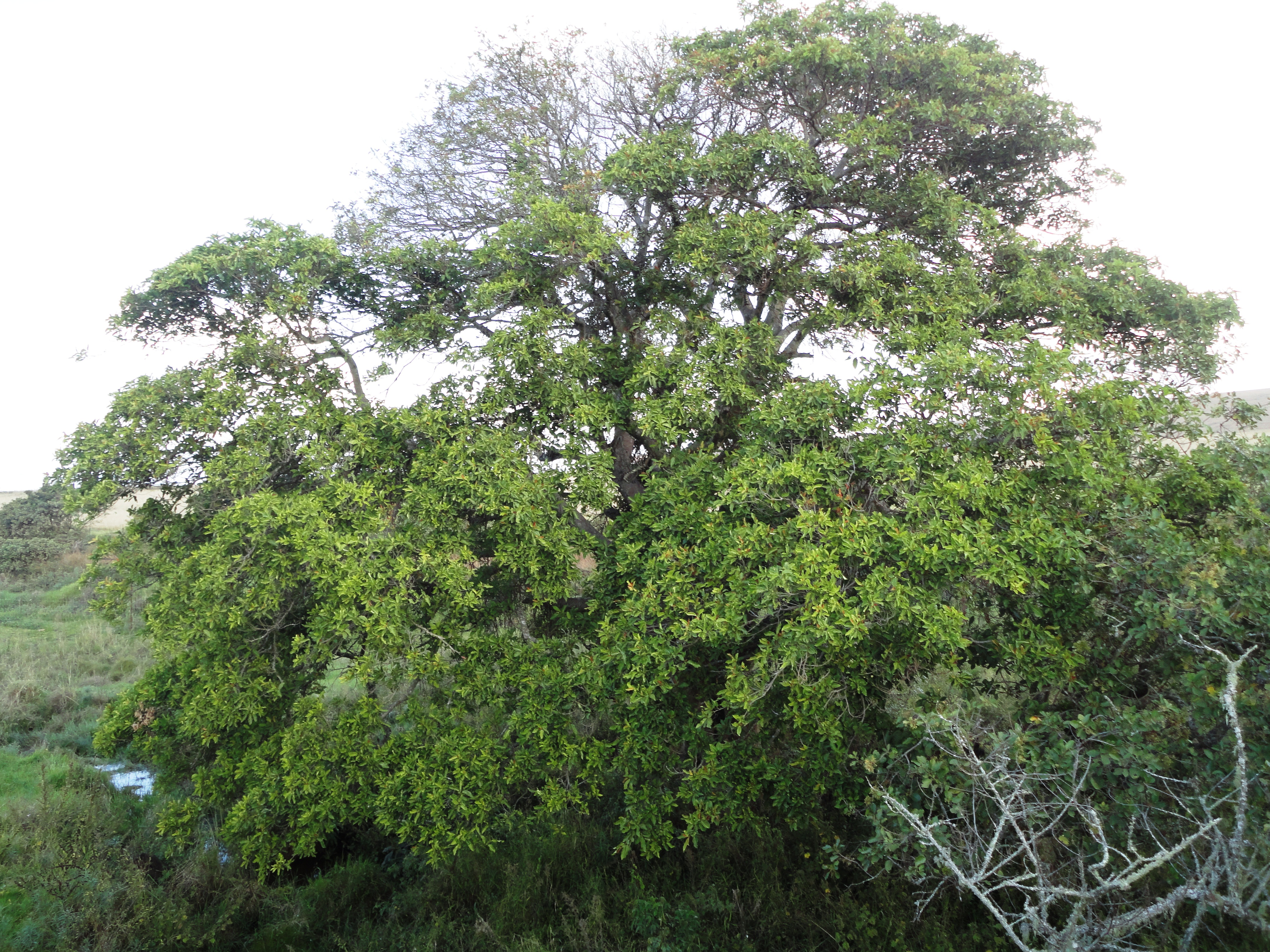

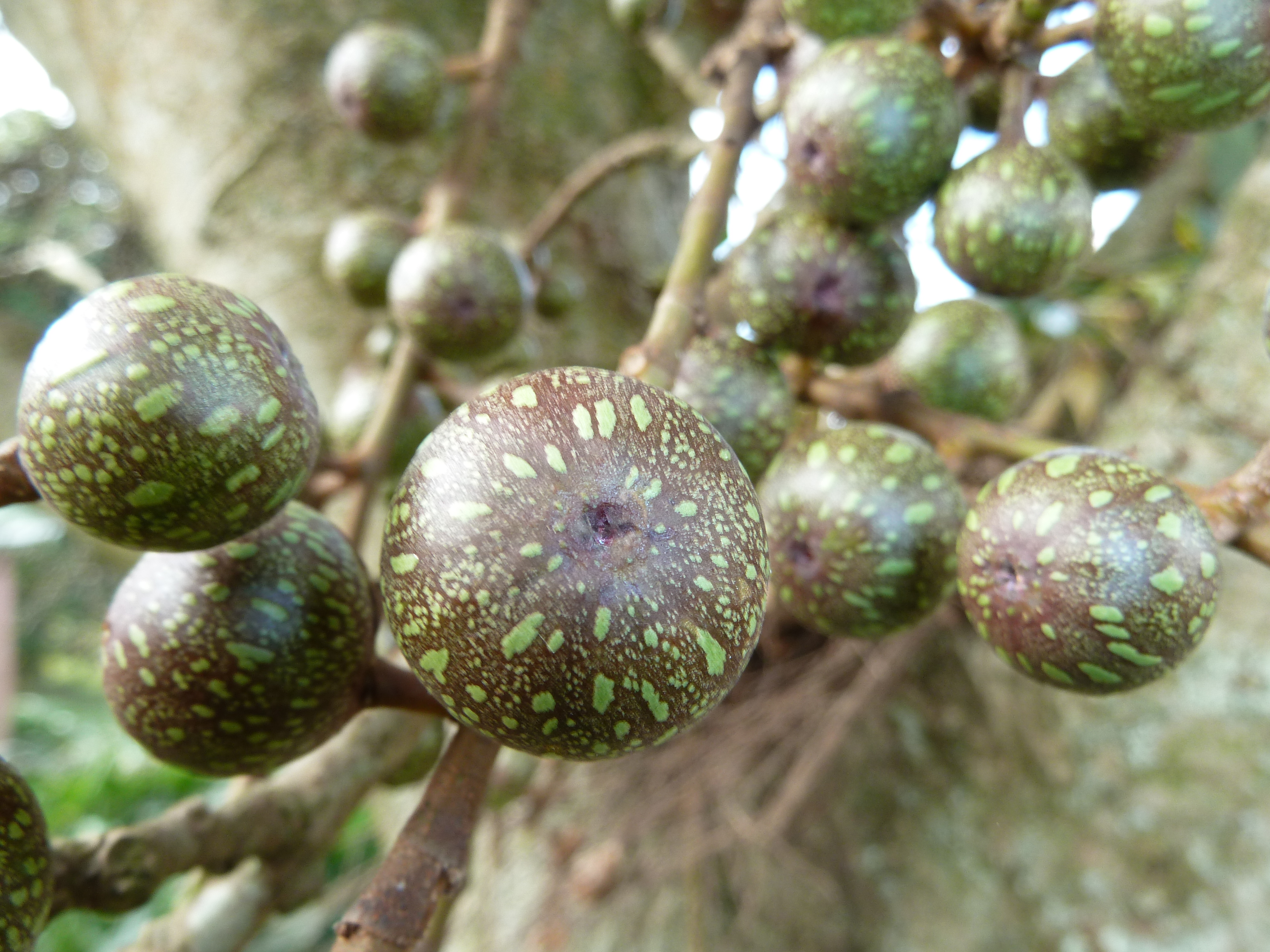

Conservation status
- Least Concern (IUCN 3.1)

Scientific classification
- Kingdom: Plantae
- Clade: Tracheophytes
- Clade: Angiosperms
- Clade: Eudicots
- Clade: Rosids
- Order: Rosales
- Family: Moraceae
- Genus: Ficus
- Species: F. sur

Binomial name
- Ficus sur Forssk. (1775)
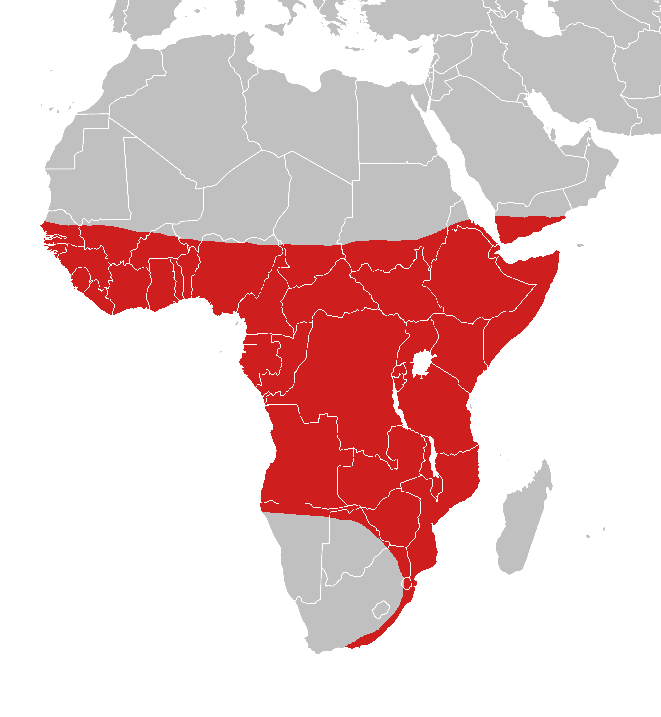
- range of F. sur

Synonyms
- Synonymy: Ficus beniensis De Wild.; Ficus brassii R.Br. ex Sabine; Ficus capensis Thunb. (Note: The presence of two stamens per flower, rather than one, was found to be an inconsistent characteristic, see: Aweke, Getachew (1979). "A Revision of the Genus Ficus in Ethiopia". Meded. Landb. Wag. 793 (66).); Ficus capensis var. beniensis (De Wild.) Lebrun; Ficus capensis var. guineensis Hiern; Ficus capensis var. ituriensis (De Wild.) Lebrun; Ficus capensis var. mallotocarpa (Warb.) Mildbr. & Burret; Ficus capensis var. ostiolata (De Wild.) Lebrun; Ficus capensis var. pubescens Warb. ex De Wild. & T.Durand; Ficus capensis f. pubifolia Mildbr. & Burret; Ficus capensis var. trichoneura Warb.; Ficus clethrophylla Hiern; Ficus erubescens Warb.; Ficus gongoensis De Wild.; Ficus guineensis (Miq.) Stapf; Ficus hermannii André; Ficus ituriensis De Wild.; Ficus kondeensis Warb.; Ficus lichtensteinii Link; Ficus mallotocarpa Warb. (Note: A subtropical form with shaggy figs that ranges from Tanzania to northern South Africa, cf. Berg, C.C. (1991) and Palmer, Eve (1977). A Field Guide to the Trees of Southern Africa. London, Johannesburg: Collins. pp. 91–92. ISBN 0-620-05468-9.); Ficus munsae Warb.; Ficus ostiolata De Wild.; Ficus ostiolata var. brevipedunculata De Wild.; Ficus panifica Delile; Ficus plateiocarpa Warb.; Ficus riparia (Miq.) A.Rich.; Ficus stellulata var. glabrescens Warb.; Ficus sycomorus var. alnea Hiern; Ficus sycomorus var. polybotrya Hiern; Ficus sycomorus var. prodigiosa Hiern; Ficus thonningiana (Miq.) Miq.

= Ficus sur =

Cape fig

Species of fig

Ficus sur, with the common names Cape fig and broom cluster fig, (Note: The etymology of the specific name is unclear. It may be of Arabic origin and suggest Sur, Oman, where it is not native.) is a widespread Afrotropical species of cauliflorous fig.

== Distribution ==
The tree is found from Cape Verde and Senegambia across tropical West Africa to Cameroon and the Central African Republic; eastwards to Eritrea, northern Somalia and Yemen; and southwards through all tropical eastern and southern African countries. It is not found in Lesotho or the dry interior regions of Botswana, Namibia, or South Africa.

It is found in tropical forests and grassy woodlands, and occurs in higher densities within well-watered, temperate upland habitats. It is absent or outnumbered at lower, warmer climates by the similarly cauliflorous species, Ficus sycomorus. In cooler climates it is a coastal tree, and in warmer interior climates may be found up to 2,500 metres (8,200 ft) in elevation.

Over its extensive range it is variable with respect to leaf shape, texture of the leaves and figs, deciduousness and overall size.

== Description ==
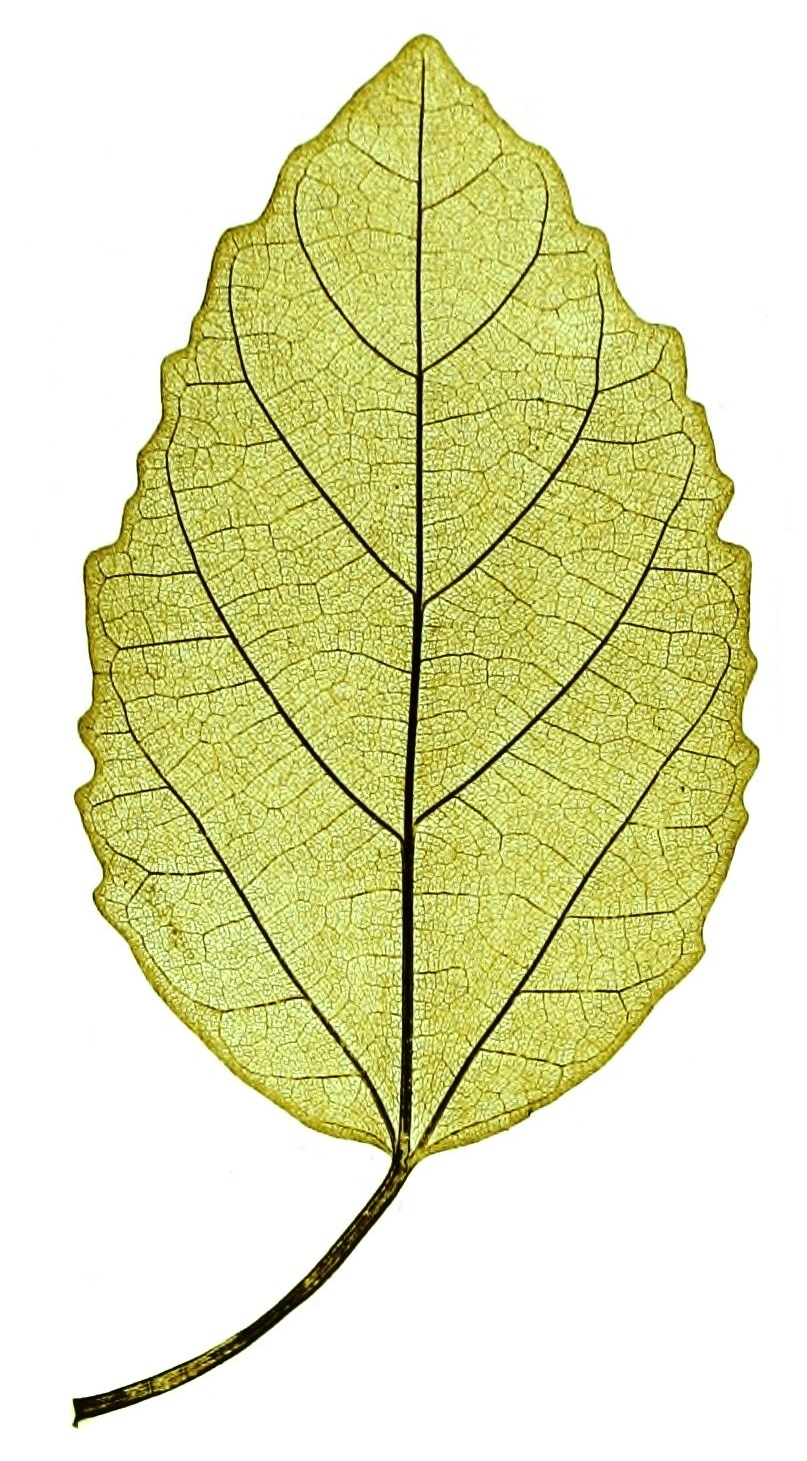
Nature printed leaf, showing shape and venation

Ficus sur is a fast-growing, deciduous or evergreen tree. It usually grows from 5–12 metres (16–39 ft) in height, but may attain a height of 35–40 metres (115–131 ft). Large specimens develop a massive spreading crown, fluted trunks, and buttress roots.

The large, alternate and spirally arranged leaves are ovate to elliptic with irregularly serrated margins. Fresh foliage is a conspicuous red colour and the papery, 1 cm long stipules are soon dropped. The bark of younger trees is smooth and pale greyish-white in colour, in contrast to the flaky, yellow bark of F. sycomorus. With increasing age the bark becomes darker and rough.

The figs are carried on short or long drooping spurs (or fascicles) which may emerge from surface roots, the trunk or especially from lower main branches. The figs are 2–4 cm in diameter and acquire a rosy, speckled exterior when ripe.

The fig seeds are dispersed after passing through the intestinal tracts of birds, bats, and primates.

=== Species associations ===
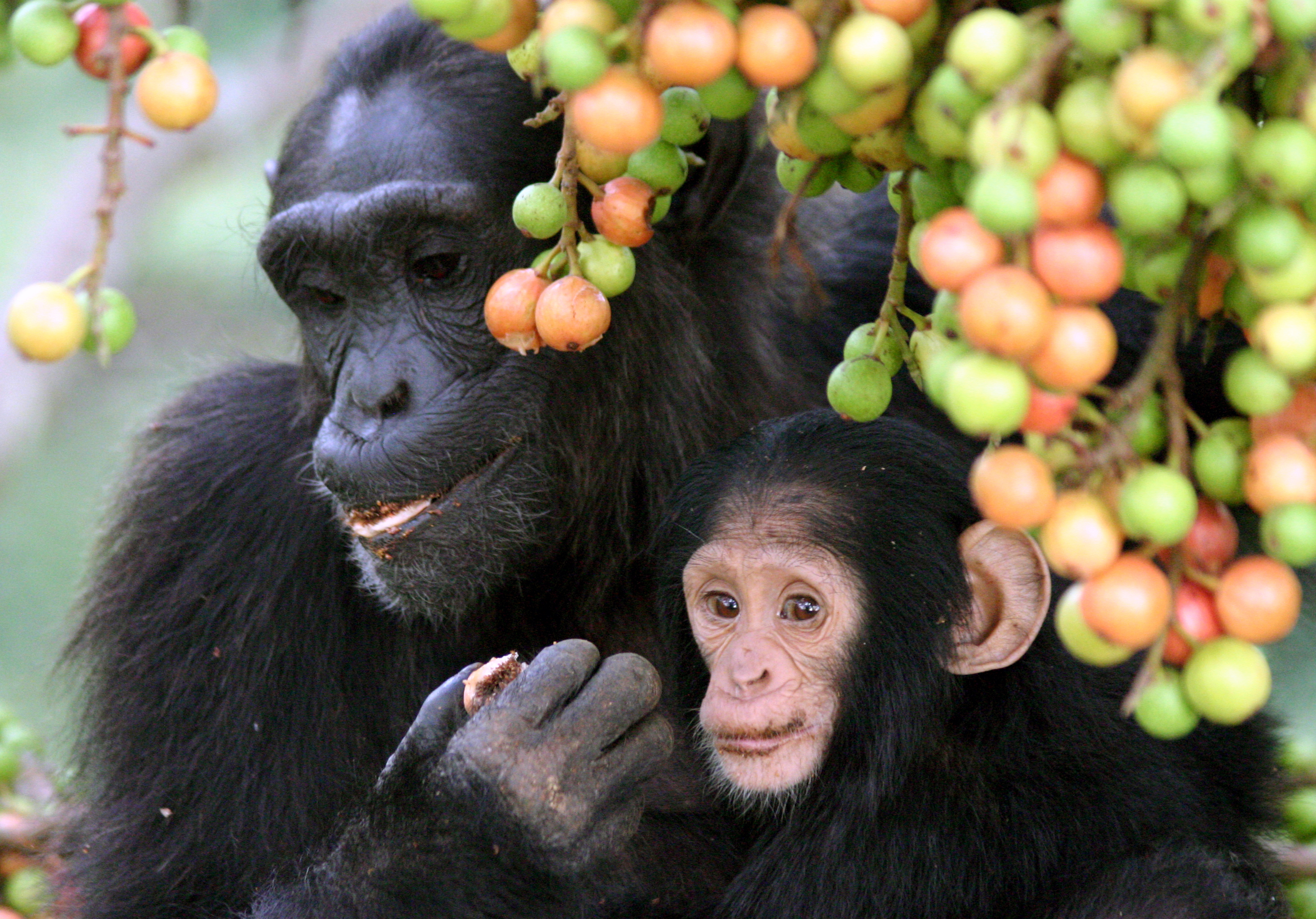
Eastern chimpanzees, feeding on Ficus sur fruit in Kibale National Park, Uganda

Lepidopteran larvae of the African map butterfly, fig tree moth, accented hawk moth, specious tiger, common fig-tree blue and lesser fig-tree blue feed on the leaves or roots of this species.

Pollination is performed by three species of Ceratosolen wasp. The Ceratosolen wasps are parasitised by Apocrypta guineensis and Sycoscapter niger wasps during their larval development inside the flower galls. As of 2006, 19 species of fig wasp were known to associate with the Cape fig, these belonging to genera Acophila, Apocrypta, Apocryptophagus, Ceratosolen, Eukoebelea, Idarnes, Sycomacophila, Sycophaga, Sycophila, Sycoscapter and Watshamiella. The Afrotropical fig wasp fauna is however poorly known.

== Uses ==
The figs are edible and utilized in fresh or dried form by native people in many regions. They are also suited to preparation of fig preserve, if other suitable fruit are added.

The heavily clustered figs suggest fecundity, and some trees in East Africa have been venerated as sacred shrines in animist practices.

The wood is light and soft, and is not much used commercially.

=== Traditional medicinal plant ===
All parts may exude a latex, which has some traditional medicinal plant uses. The latex has been shown to contain ursene and oleanane triterpenoids, of which the latter may be effective in cancer treatment, while a methanolic extract from the roots is potentially effective against chloroquine-resistant malaria.

== Gallery ==
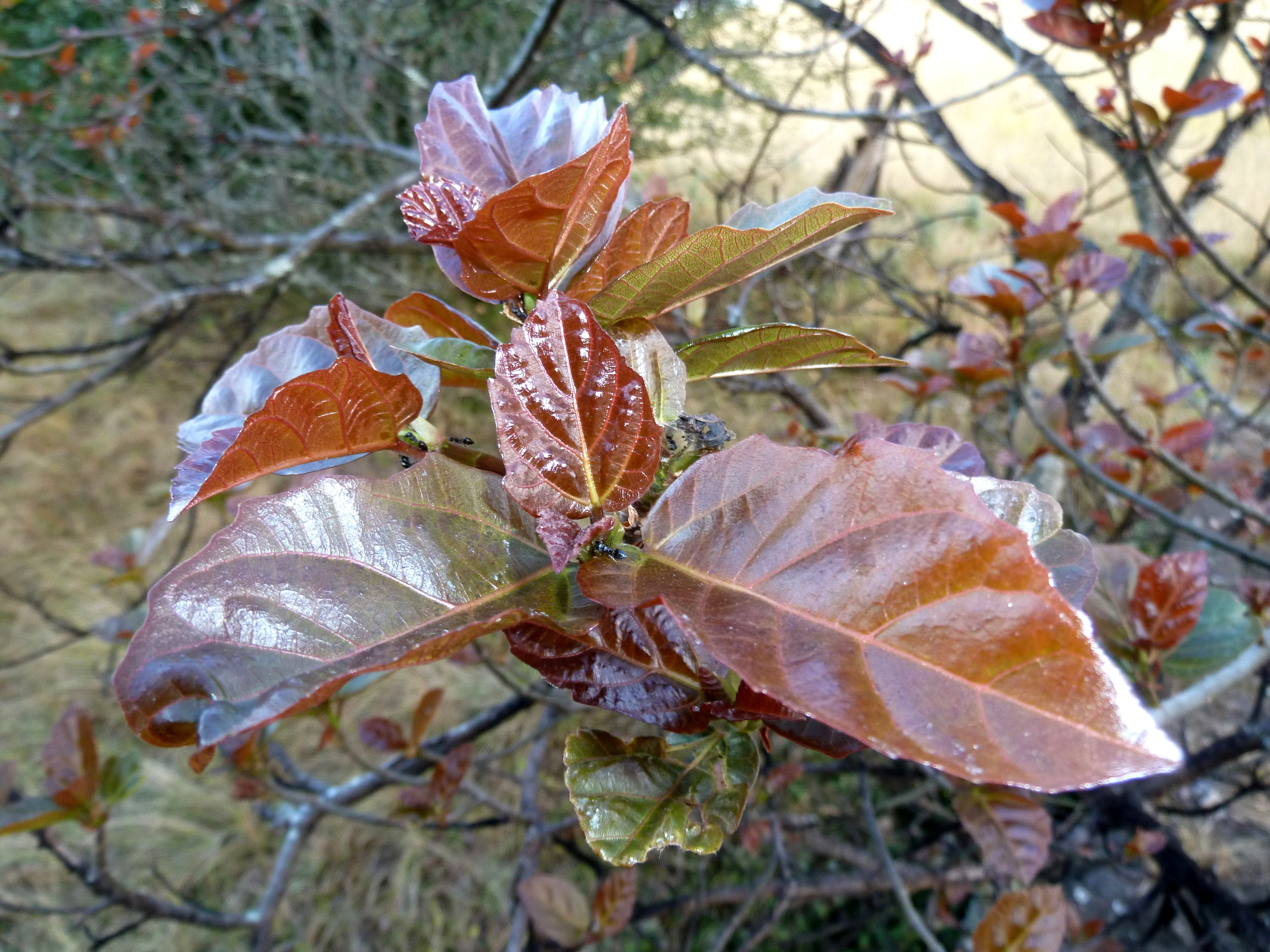
Fresh foliage tended by Crematogaster ants

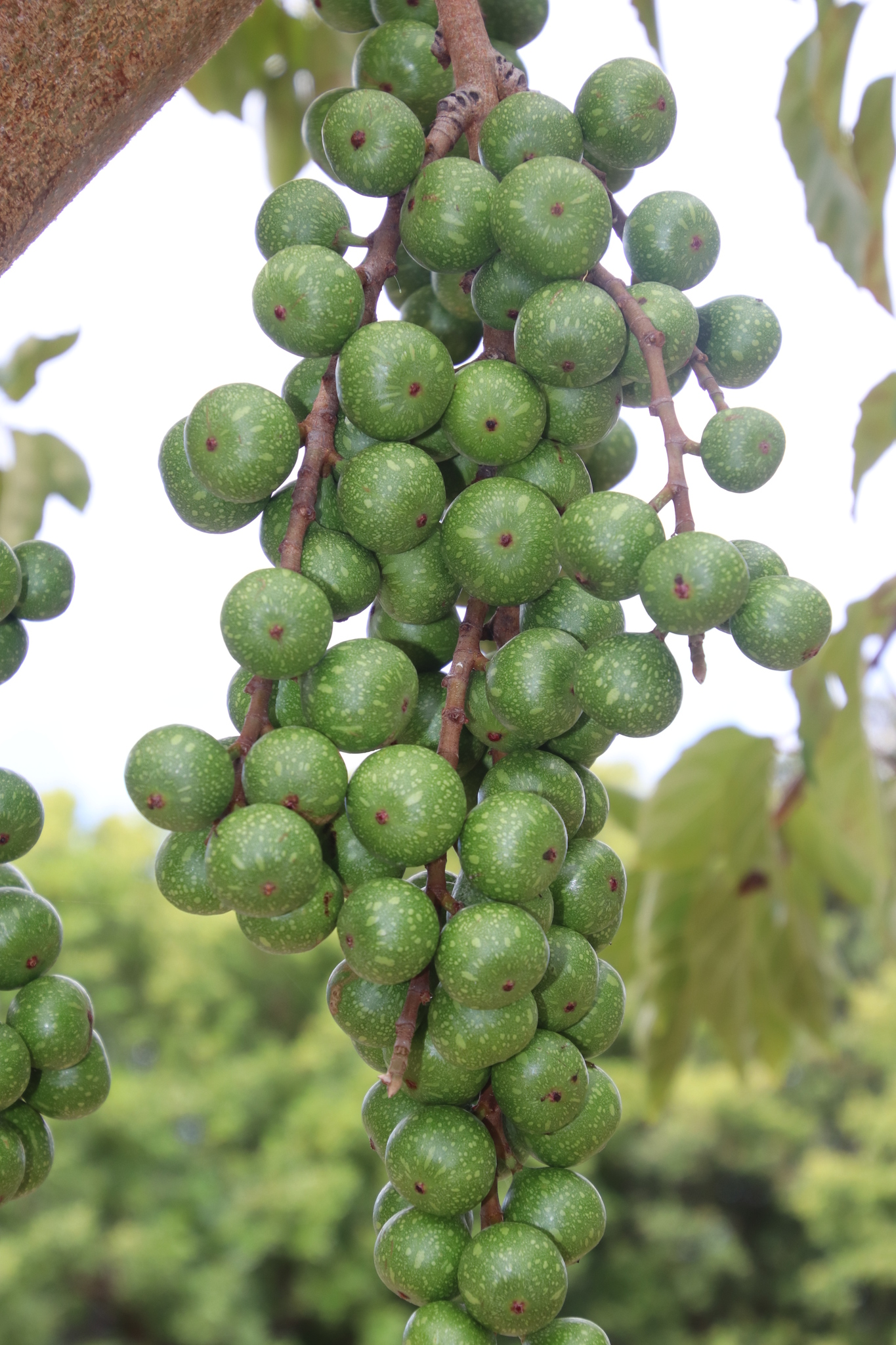
Drooping paniculate spur with fig clusters

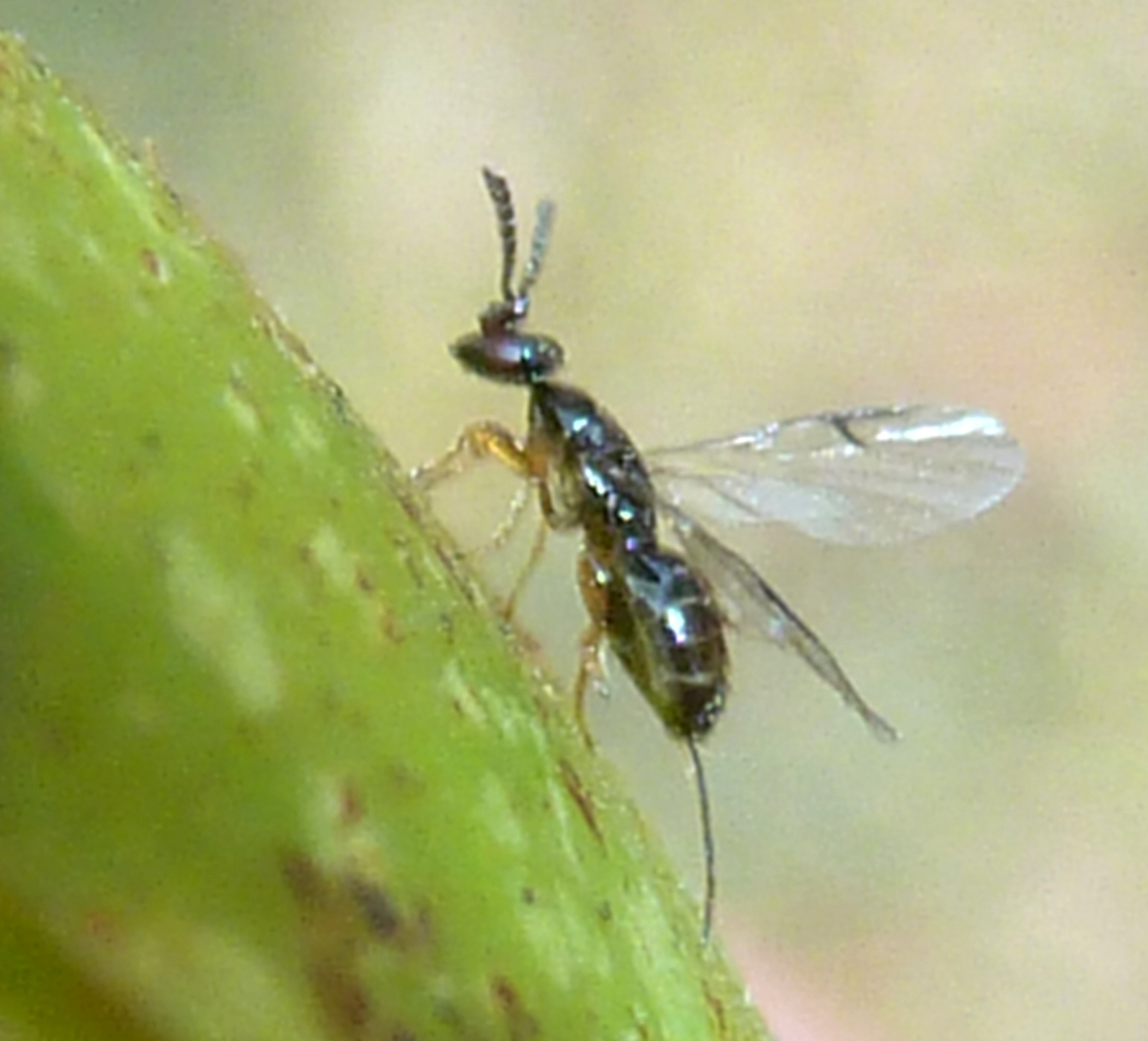
Ceratosolen capensis adult, a pollinating wasp

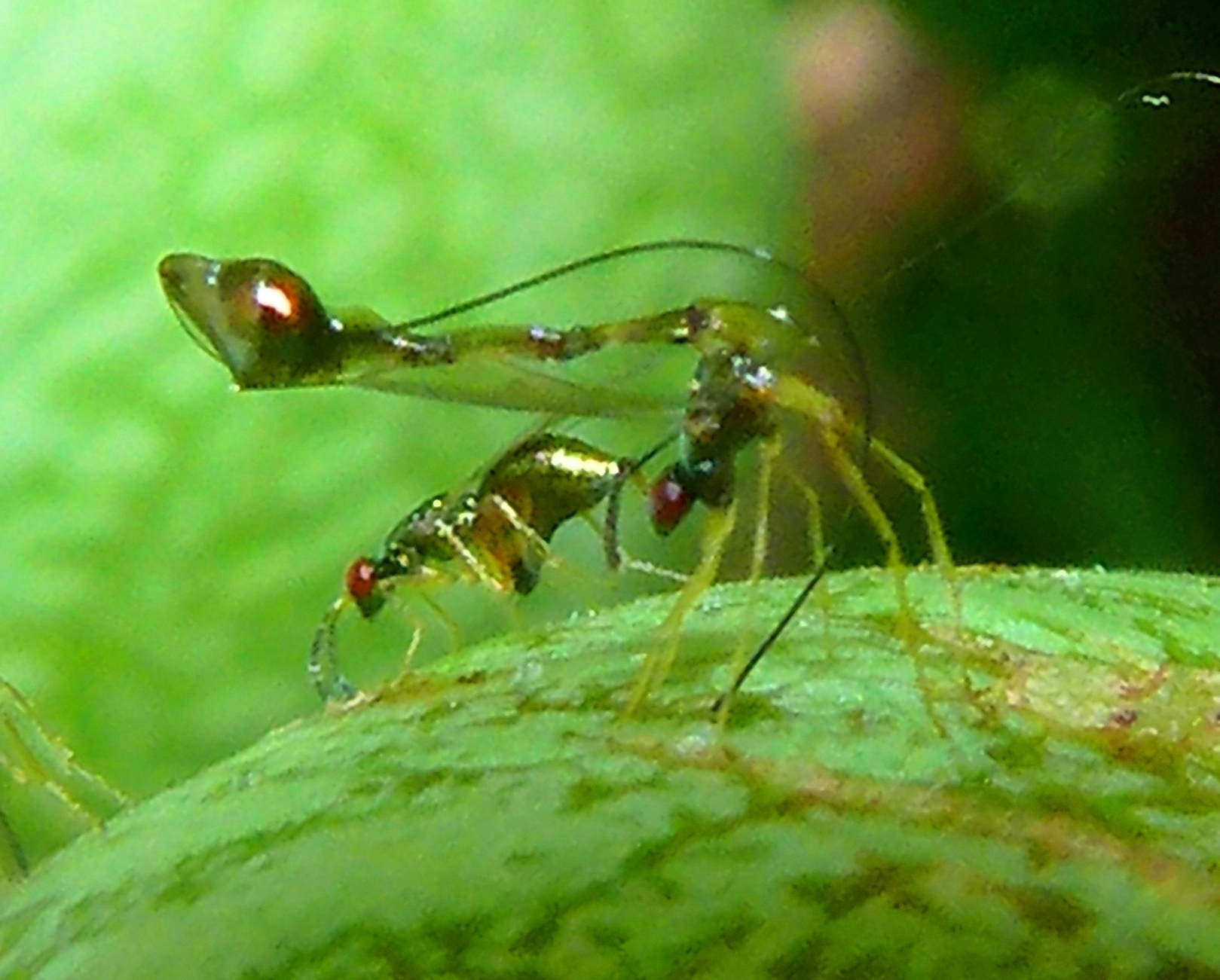
Apocrypta guineensis wasps, parasitoids of Ceratosolen capensis larvae
