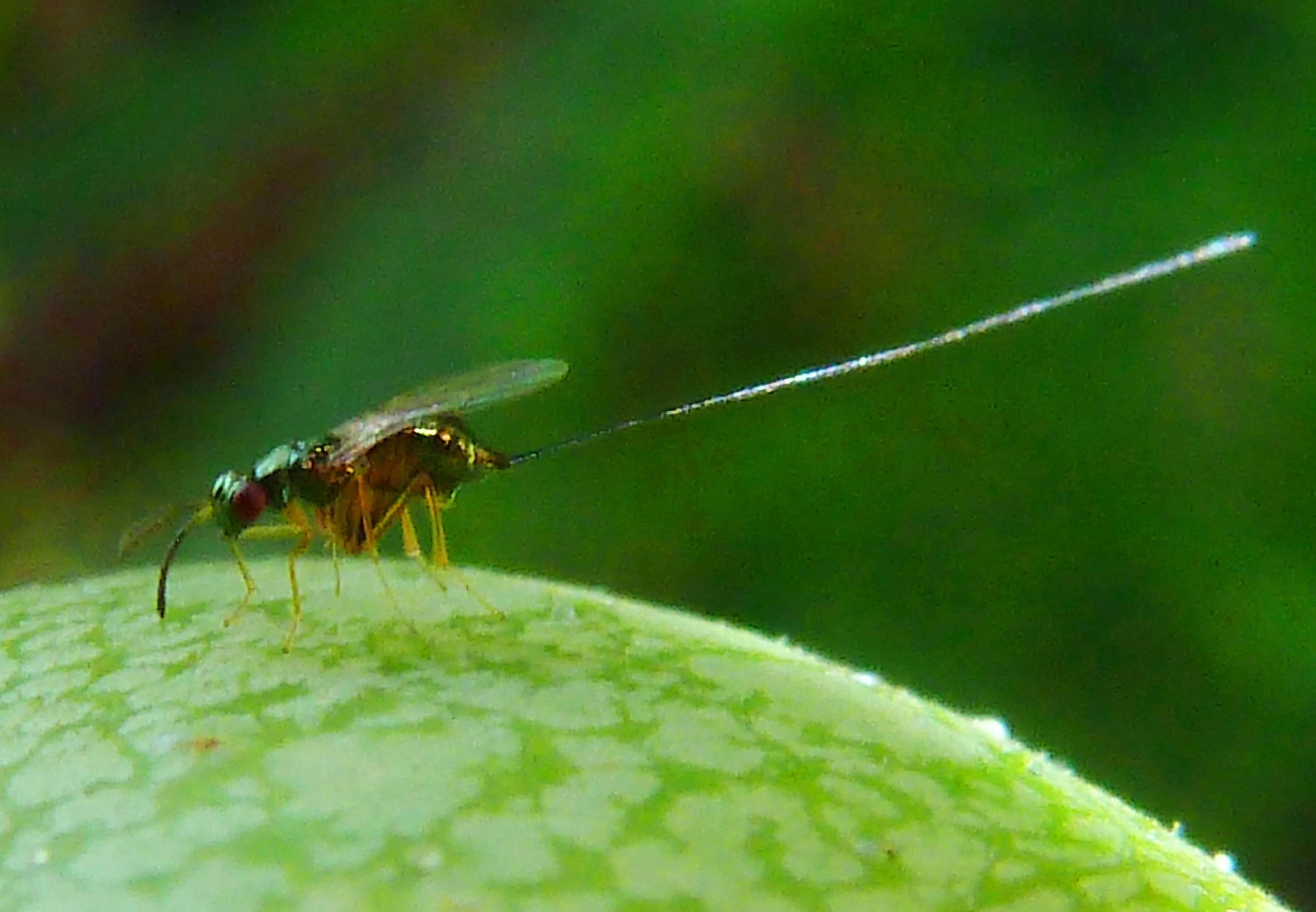
- Female A. guineensis wasp on Ficus sur showing elongate external ovipositor

Scientific classification
- Kingdom: Animalia
- Phylum: Arthropoda
- Class: Insecta
- Order: Hymenoptera
- Family: Pteromalidae
- Subfamily: Pteromalinae
- Tribe: Otitesellini
- Genus: Apocrypta; Coquerel, 1855

Type species
- Apocrypta perplexa Coquerel, 1855

Species
- See text

= Apocrypta =

Genus of wasps

Apocrypta is an Old World genus of parasitic fig wasps in the family Pteromalidae. They are parasitoids of gall-wasps in the Sycophagini tribe, and especially Ceratosolen species, pollinators of the Sycomorus, Sycocarpus and Neomorphe sections of Ficus. They seem to be fig species-specific.

== Biology ==
They parasitize certain species of the fig wasp genera Apocryptophagus and Ceratosolen. The long ovipositor is pierced through the fig wall to infect the fig wasp larvae during their development inside the flower galls. Penetration of the syconium wall may last from 6 to 55 minutes, depending on the wasp and fig species.

Ceratosolen wasps are key pollinator species, and their production is consequently reduced. Apocryptophagus wasps are however gall forming non-pollinators. Some differences in Apocrypta behaviour and morphology reflect the variety in fig inflorescence morphology.

== Morphology ==
The adult female has an elongate external ovipositor, some 2 to 5 mm long, which reflects the thickness of the syconium wall of the host fig species. To stabilize the long ovipositor during oviposition, the proximal gastral segments can telescope outwards as the abdomen is lifted up, which in some species leans forward beyond the head. The ovipositor is enclosed and guided by a flexible ovipositor sheath. As in several genera of parasitic wasp, the highly flexible sheath supports the ovipositor's tip during the initial stages of oviposition. In some species, such as Apocrypta westwoodi, the ovipositor has zinc-hardened drill bits.

== Species ==
There are some 27 described species which include:

- Apocrypta acaeta Ulenberg, 1985
- Apocrypta bakeri (Joseph, 1952) – host fig F. hispida, host C. solmsi Mayr
- Apocrypta brachycephala Grandi, 1916
- Apocrypta caudata (Girault, 1915)
- Apocrypta guineensis Grandi, 1916 – host fig F. sur, host C. capensis, etc.
- Apocrypta perplexa Coquerel, 1855 – host fig F. mauritiana
- Apocrypta polyspina Ulenberg, 1985
- Apocrypta regalis Grandi, 1916
- Apocrypta robusta Grandi, 1916 – host fig F. vallis-choudae
- Apocrypta setoptera Ulenberg, 1855
- Apocrypta suprasegmenta Ulenberg, 1985
- Apocrypta tanyceraea Ulenberg, 1985
- Apocrypta varicolor (Mayr, 1885)
- Apocrypta westwoodi Grandi, 1916 – host fig F. racemosa, host C. fusciceps
- Apocrypta sp. – host fig F. semicordata, host C. gravelyi Grandi

== Gallery ==
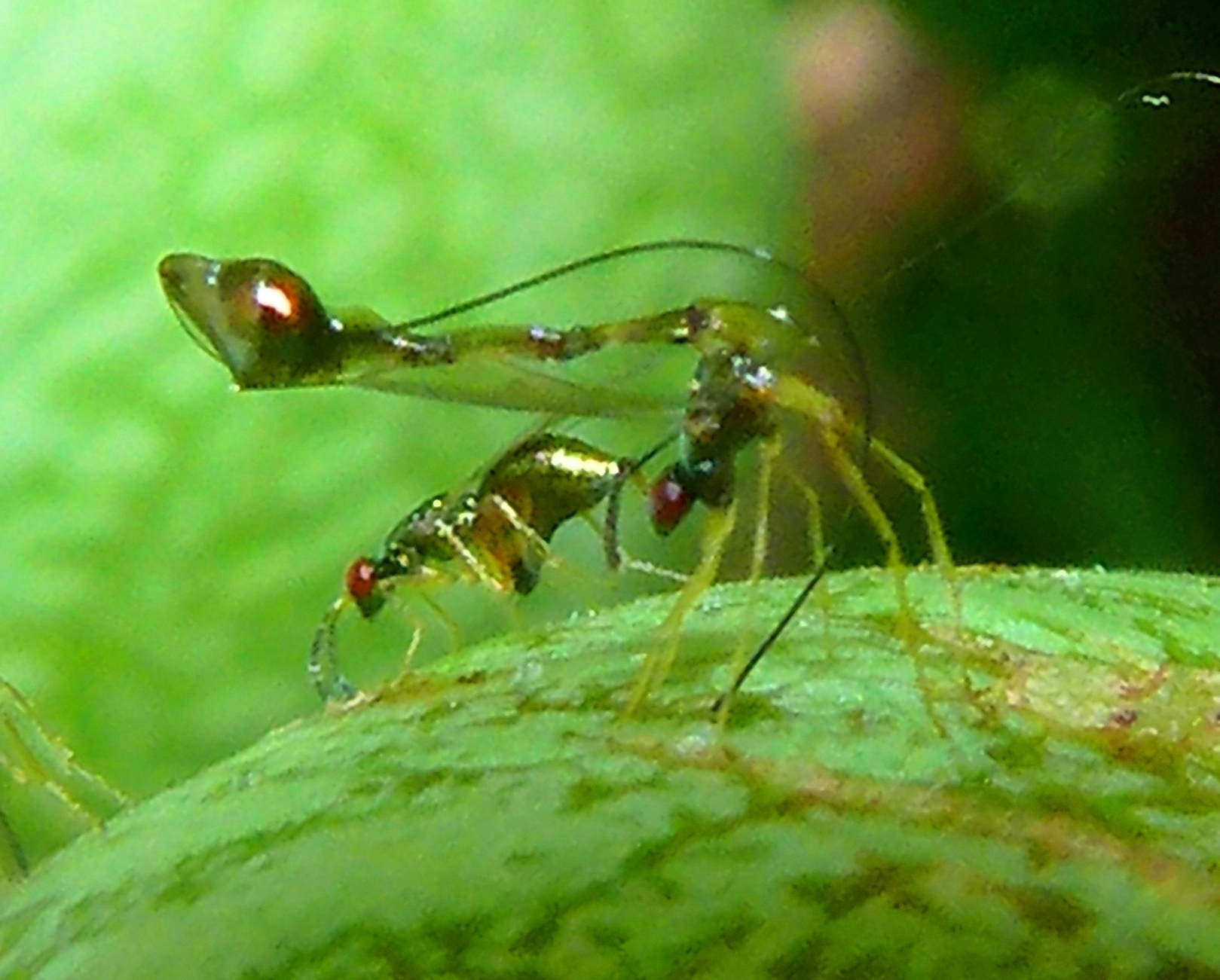
Ovipositing female positioning her flexible ovipositor sheath

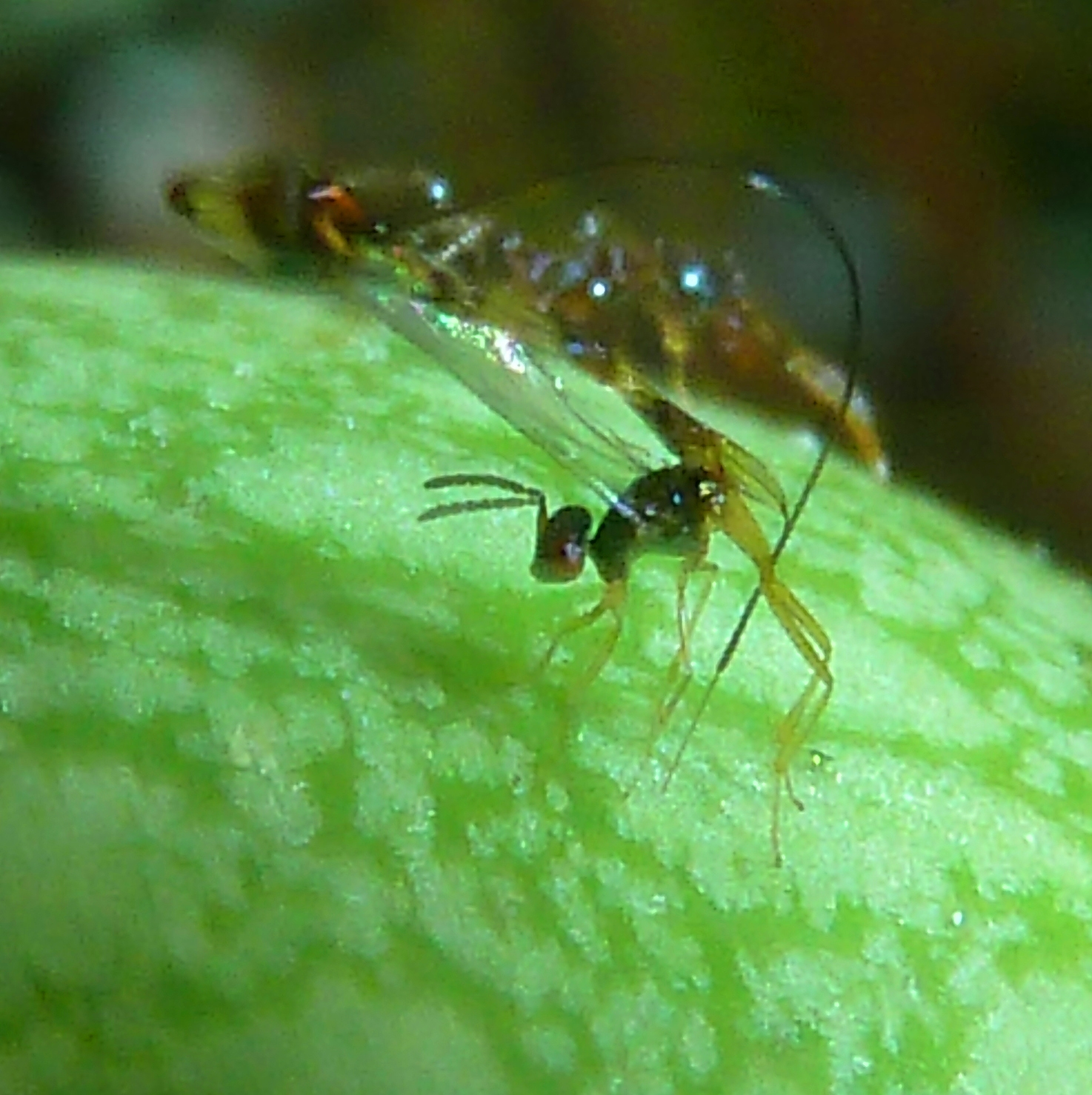
Ovipositor protruding from tip of ovipositor sheath

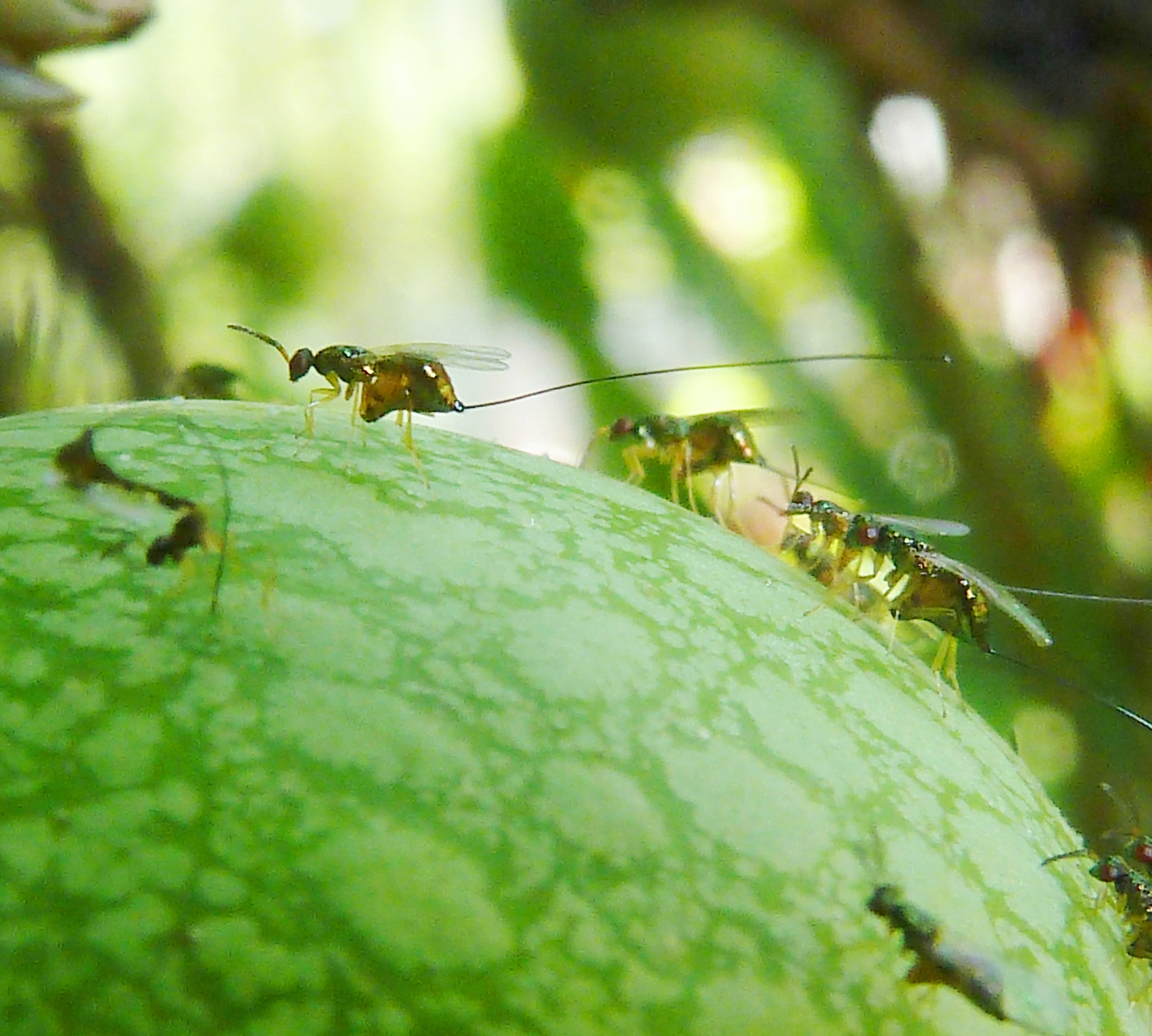
Females congregating on a young fig
