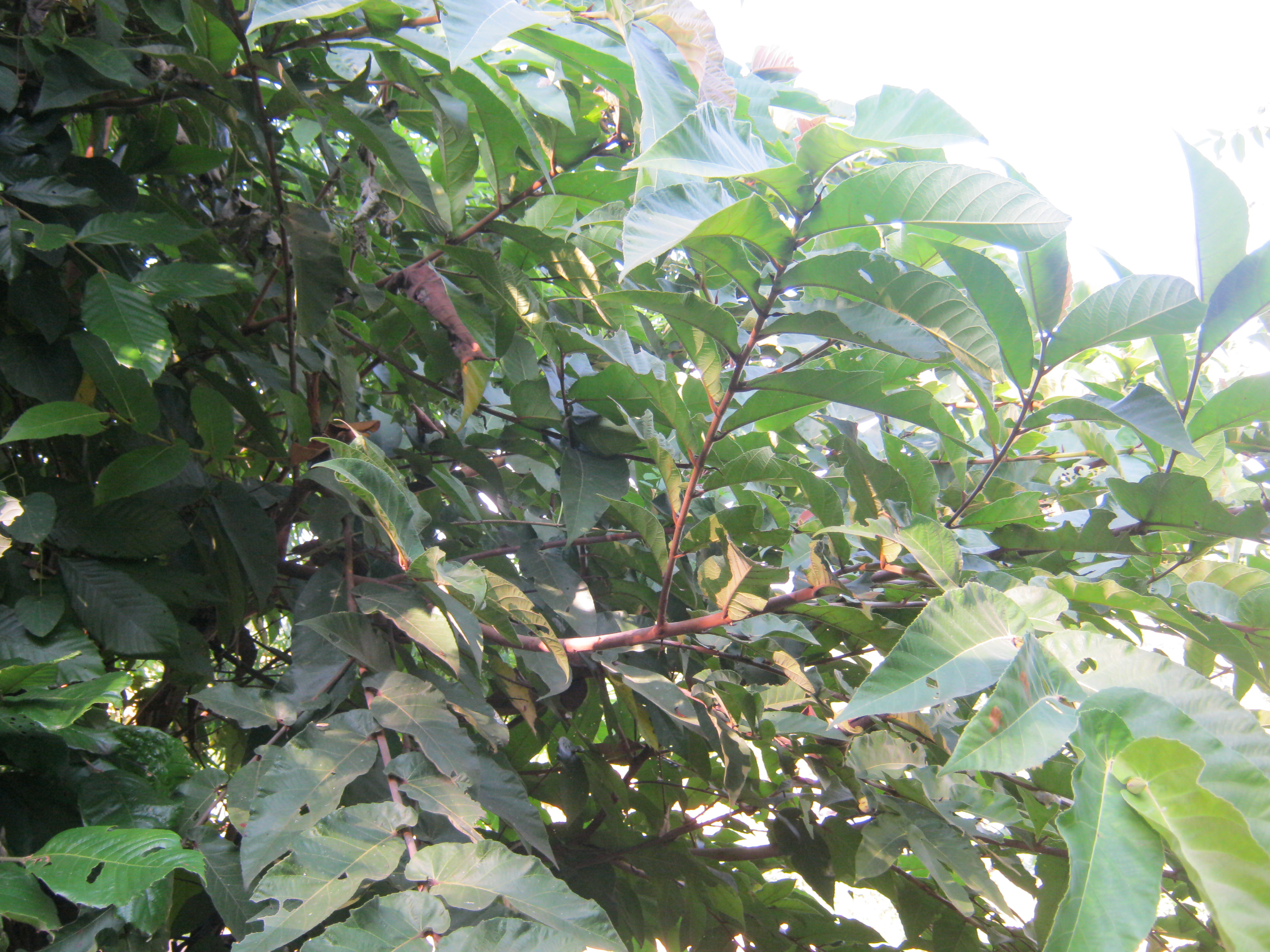
- F. semicordata (Nepali: Khanayo) in the Panchkhal valley
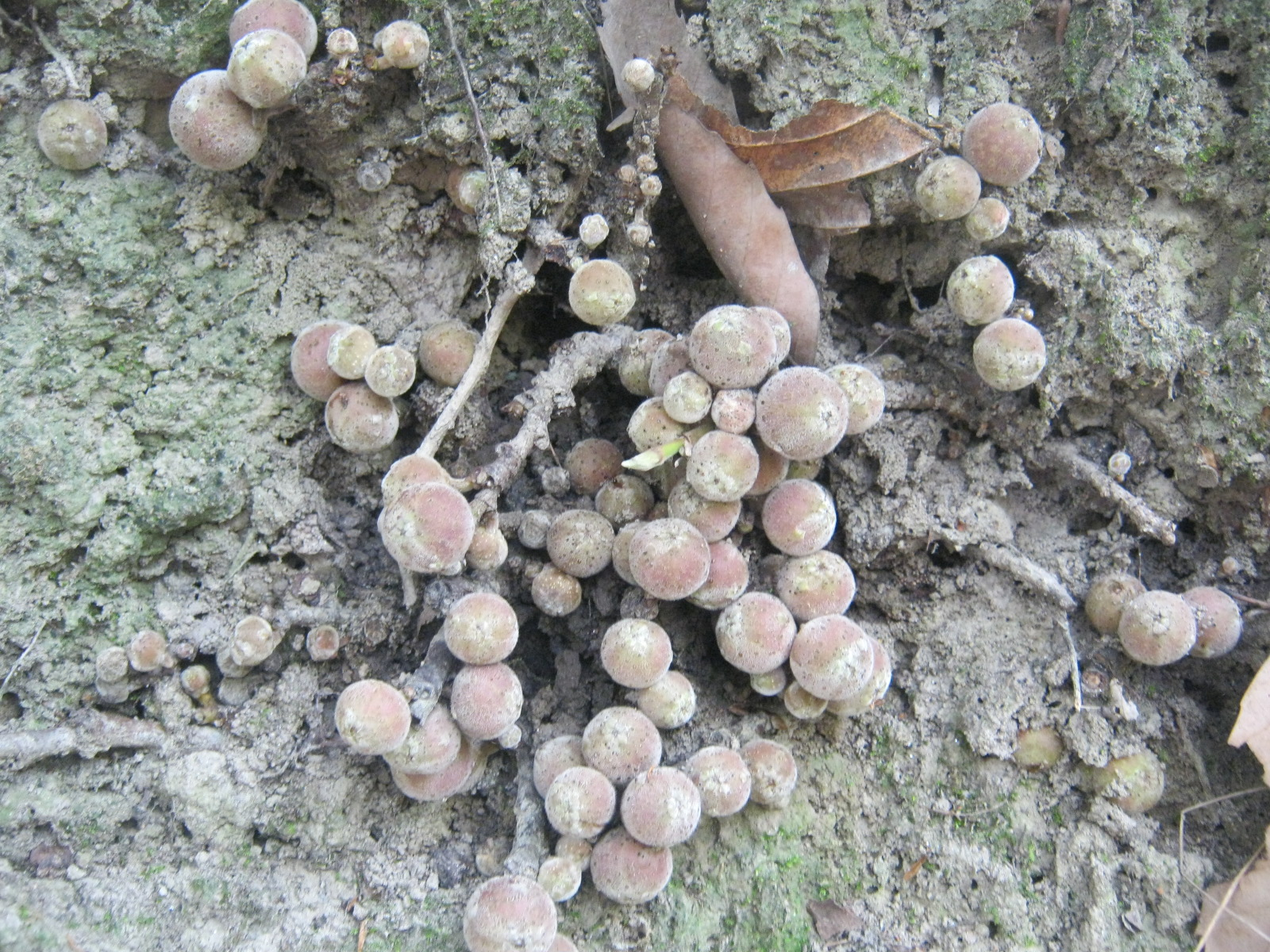
- figs

Conservation status
- Least Concern (IUCN 3.1)

Scientific classification
- Kingdom: Plantae
- Clade: Tracheophytes
- Clade: Angiosperms
- Clade: Eudicots
- Clade: Rosids
- Order: Rosales
- Family: Moraceae
- Genus: Ficus
- Species: F. semicordata

Binomial name
- Ficus semicordata Buch.-Ham. ex Sm.

Varieties
- Ficus semicordata var. conglomerata (Roxb.) Corner; Ficus semicordata var. montana Amatya; Ficus semicordata var. semicordata

Synonyms
- synonyms of var. conglomerata: Covellia conglomerata (Roxb.) Miq.; Ficus conglomerata Roxb.; Ficus cunia var. conglomerata (Roxb.) Kurz; synonyms of var. semicordata: Covellia cunia (Buch.-Ham. ex Roxb.) Miq.; Covellia inaequiloba Miq.; Ficus cunia Buch.-Ham. ex Roxb.; Ficus hapalophylla Kurz

= Ficus semicordata =

Drooping fig

Species of flowering plant

Ficus semicordata, commonly known as the drooping fig, is a small to medium-sized fodder tree of genus Ficus. It is native to subtropical and tropical Asia, ranging from northern Pakistan through the Himalayas of India, Nepal, Bhutan and Tibet to Indochina (Laos, Myanmar, Thailand, and Vietnam), southern China, and Peninsular Malaysia. It bears edible fruit. The figs on the lower part of the leafless branches may develop in leaf litter and humus, and be buried in the surface of the soil, where the seeds germinate. Otherwise birds and other animals distribute the seeds.

Ficus semicordata is dioecious, with male and female flowers produced on separate individuals.

== Varieties ==
Three varieties are accepted:

- Ficus semicordata var. conglomerata (Roxb.) Corner – northeastern India and Myanmar
- Ficus semicordata var. montana Amatya – Nepal
- Ficus semicordata var. semicordata – northern Pakistan, the Himalayas of India, Nepal, Bhutan and Tibet, Indochina (Laos, Myanmar, Thailand, and Vietnam), southern China, and Peninsular Malaysia

== Phylogenetics ==
It is closely related to the sycamore fig and Ficus prostrata may be its closest living relative. The Open Tree of Life suggests the following phylogenetic relationships:

- - - - - - F. mucuso
          - F. sycomorus — sycamore fig
        - F. sur — Cape fig
      - F. racemosa — cluster fig
    - F. uncinulata
  - - - F. auriculata — elephant ear tree
      - - F. vallischoudae
        - - F. mauritiana
          - F. torrentium
    - - F. tikoua
      - - F. prostrata
        - F. semicordata
