= Obligate mutualism =

Special case of mutualism

Obligate mutualism is a special case of mutualism where an ecological interaction between species mutually benefits each other, and one or all species are unable to survive without the other. In some obligate relationships, only one species is dependent on the relationship. Fig and fig wasps are an example of a co-obligate relationship, where both species are totally dependent on the relationship. The fig plant is entirely dependent on the fig wasp for pollination, and the fig wasp requires the fig plant for reproductive purposes. Many insect-fungi relationships are also co-obligate: the insect disperses, and in some cases protects, the fungi while the fungi provide nutrients for the insects. This interaction allows insects and fungi to, as a group, inhabit previously inhospitable or unreachable environments. Though obligate relationships need not be limited to two species, they are often discussed as such, with the relationship being made up of a host and a symbiont, though the terms are often attributed arbitrarily.

== Evolution of obligate mutualism ==
Obligate mutualistic relationships, where species are entirely dependent on each other for survival, can evolve through different pathways. In some cases, a free-living symbiont may be engulfed by a host organism and subsequently passed down through vertical transmission, resulting in an obligate dependency. However, it is more common for facultative mutualisms, where the mutualist can exist independently or in association with a host, to act as an intermediary step toward the evolution of obligate or co-obligate mutualism. In this second case, the evolution of obligate mutualism can be divided into three steps: formation, maintenance, and transformation.

=== Formation ===
The formation of the facultative mutualism requires that the species involved all benefit from their mutual cooperation. This mutualism, though it is to the benefit of said species, is best understood as co-exploitation. Facultative mutualism occurs when species' interests align, so that each may reciprocally exploit the other to the benefit of both.

=== Maintenance ===
In order for facultative relationships to turn into obligate relationships, the facultative mutualism must be maintained and continued across generations. There are two methods for the relationship to be carried through generations: vertical and horizontal transmission. Vertical transmission involves the passage of symbionts from parent to offspring hosts. Horizontal transmission involves the passage of symbionts between unrelated hosts. It is proposed that vertical transmission makes for a more stable relationship, because in vertical transmission a host is paired with the same symbiont in every generation, thus the host and symbiont have more chance for co-adaption. In vertical transmission, the hosts and symbionts also share reproductive fate and therefore both suffer from cheating.

A cheater is a mutualist who gains more than they get. An extreme example would be an organism who gains from a relationship without giving anything, such as an insect that feeds on nectar without contributing to pollination. Cheaters are thought to destabilize mutualistic relationships, both when they arrive as a third exploitative party and when they result as mutants within pre-existing mutualistic relationships. Horizontal transmission, where there can be multiple symbionts, can result in competition between symbionts and exploitation of the host.

There are many obligate relationships involving horizontal transmission. And it has also been found that mutualist/exploiter co-existence is not uncommon. Cheaters often exist alongside mutualistic relationships, and in obligate mutualism the presence of third party explorers early in the formation of the relationship may protect the host-symbiont relationship from further exploitation later on.

=== Transformation ===
Once a mutualistic group has reached a point of stability, where both species are benefiting and there is not a destabilizing problem with cheaters, the third stage, transformation, can occur. In this stage, the mutualists lose the ability to survive independently of one another and thus form a new superorganism. In this case, each symbiont has become so specialized within the mutualistic group that they are now fully dependent on the relationship.

Physiological and behavioral changes can evolve as consequences of obligate dependency. In insect-fungi mutualistic groups, for example, fungal spore-carrying organs in insects and the production of increasingly nutrient rich, asexually reproductive spores in fungi appear as part of the co-obligate relationship. In the fig and wasps co-obligate relationship, female wasps have developed morphological traits, such as elongated heads and easily detachable antennae and wings, that allow them to enter the fig ostile and lay eggs and collect pollen, and likewise, as the fig matures it produces nourishment for the wasp larvae.

== Evolutionary consequences ==
Obligate dependency links the evolutionary fate of the organisms involved, this coupling has the potential to result in both negative and positive consequences. This coupling can enhance the ability of the organism to evolve because natural selection can influence two genomes at once, meaning there are more opportunities for a mutation to positively impact both species. This coupling also has the potential to negatively affect species evolution by limiting the ability of one species to react to environmental selective pressures, tying the organism with the higher fitness to an organism with now lower fitness, this is called the weakest link hypothesis.

== Studying obligate mutualism ==
Understanding how obligate dependency affects the evolution of involved species as well as being able to properly identify and understand obligate relationships is important in predicting and perhaps guardian against the impacts of climate change on ecological communities. It is not easy to study or identify obligate species and the number of species involved in obligate relationships, as hosts and symbionts lose and gain traits in their relationship, making it hard to determine their taxonomic relationships with other species. Studying obligate relationships is also difficult, as they do not respond well to experimental interference.
