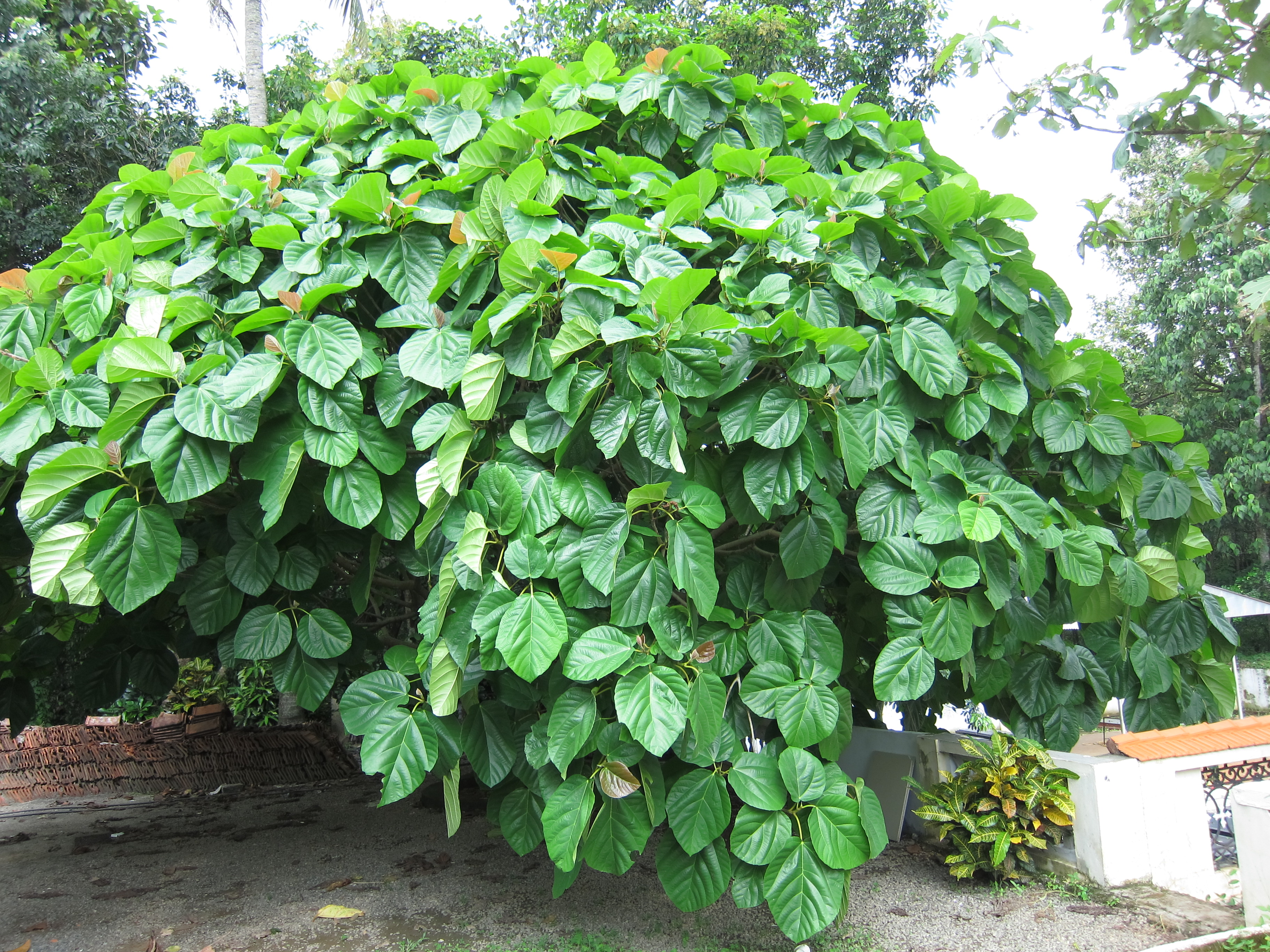

Conservation status
- Least Concern (IUCN 3.1)

Scientific classification
- Kingdom: Plantae
- Clade: Tracheophytes
- Clade: Angiosperms
- Clade: Eudicots
- Clade: Rosids
- Order: Rosales
- Family: Moraceae
- Genus: Ficus
- Subgenus: F. subg. Sycomorus
- Species: F. auriculata

Binomial name
- Ficus auriculata Lour.

Synonyms
- List: Tremotis cordata Raf.; Covellia macrophylla Miq.; Ficus beipeiensis S.S.Chang; Ficus hainanensis Merr. & Chun; Ficus hamiltoniana Wall.; Ficus imperialis G.W.Johnson & R.Hogg; Ficus macrocarpa H.Lév. & Vaniot; Ficus macrocarpa H.Lév. & Vaniot; Ficus macrophylla Roxb. & Buch.-Ham. ex Sm.; Ficus oligodon Miq.; Ficus pomifera Wall. ex King; Ficus regia Miq.; Ficus rotundifolia Roxb.; Ficus roxburghii Wall. ex Steud.; Ficus sclerocarpa Griff.; Ficus scleroptera Griff.

= Ficus auriculata =

Roxburgh fig

Species of fig

Ficus auriculata is a species of flowering plant in the family Moraceae. This fig tree is sometimes referred to by the common names Roxburgh fig and Elephant ear tree and is noted for its big and round leaves and edible fruit. It is native to subtropical and tropical Assam, Bangladesh, Cambodia, South-Central and Southeast China, East and West Himalaya, Hainan, India, Laos, Malaysia, Myanmar, Nepal, Pakistan, Thailand, Tibet, and Vietnam.

== Description ==
This plant is a small tree of 5–10 m (16–33 ft) high with numerous bristle-covered branches. The leaves are alternate, big and round, and are up to 44 cm (17 in) long and 45 cm (18 in) wide, with cordate or rounded base, acute apex, and 5–7 main veins from the leaf base. Its petioles are up to 15 cm (6 in) long, and it has stipules of about 2.5 cm (1 in) long. The plant has oblate syconium that are up to 4 cm (1.6 in) wide, covered with yellow pubescence, and emerge from the trunk or old branches of the tree. Ficus auriculata is dioecious, with male and female flowers produced on separate individuals. On ripening, the fruits turn from light yellow to purple. The fruit is a fleshy receptacle. The fruits form as large clusters on the trunk, on branches and also on the roots.

Fruit extracts contain many phenolic compounds (Gaire et al. 2011).

== Taxonomy ==
It was first published by Portuguese Botanist João de Loureiro (1717–1791), in Fl. Cochinch. on page 666 in 1790.

It is commonly known as the Roxburgh fig, which is named after botanist William Roxburgh, who was appointed Superintendent of the Calcutta Botanical Gardens by the East India Company in 1793. Experiments carried out on fruiting Ficus auriculata trees at the Calcutta Botanic Gardens by the then Superintendent George King and his Botanic Garden colleagues described in King in 1897 which was the first detailed explanation of how the dioecious figs were pollinated by fig wasps which bred in the figs of male trees and then flew to female fig trees to pollinate the female figs. It is also known as Elephant Ear Fig Tree, Elephant Ear Tree and Giant Indian Fig, due to the leaves, as auricle is the Latin word for ear, referring to the two 'ears' at the base of heart shaped leaf.

== Distribution ==
The native range of this species stretches from north-eastern Pakistan to southern China and the Malaysian peninsula. It is found in the countries (and regions) of Assam, Uttarakhand, Himachal Pradesh, Bangladesh, Cambodia, southern China, Bhutan, Sikkim, Hainan, Laos, Malaya, Myanmar, Nepal, Pakistan, Thailand and Vietnam.

== Habitat ==
It grows in forests in moist valleys, growing along stream banks.

== Ecology ==
Ceratosolen emarginatus is an insect that helps to pollinate this plant.

== Uses ==
The fresh fruit of this plant is consumed as food, and has diuretic, laxative and digestive regulating properties. Ficus auriculata is used as fodder in Nepal. It is least resistant to fire, but likes good sunlight.

The large leaves, often up to 21 in (533.4 mm) long and 12 in (304.8 mm) wide are used as plates.

== Plant problems ==
The tree is susceptible to scale. It also has minor issues with gall, mealy bugs, thrips, whitefly, and spider mite.

== Photo gallery ==
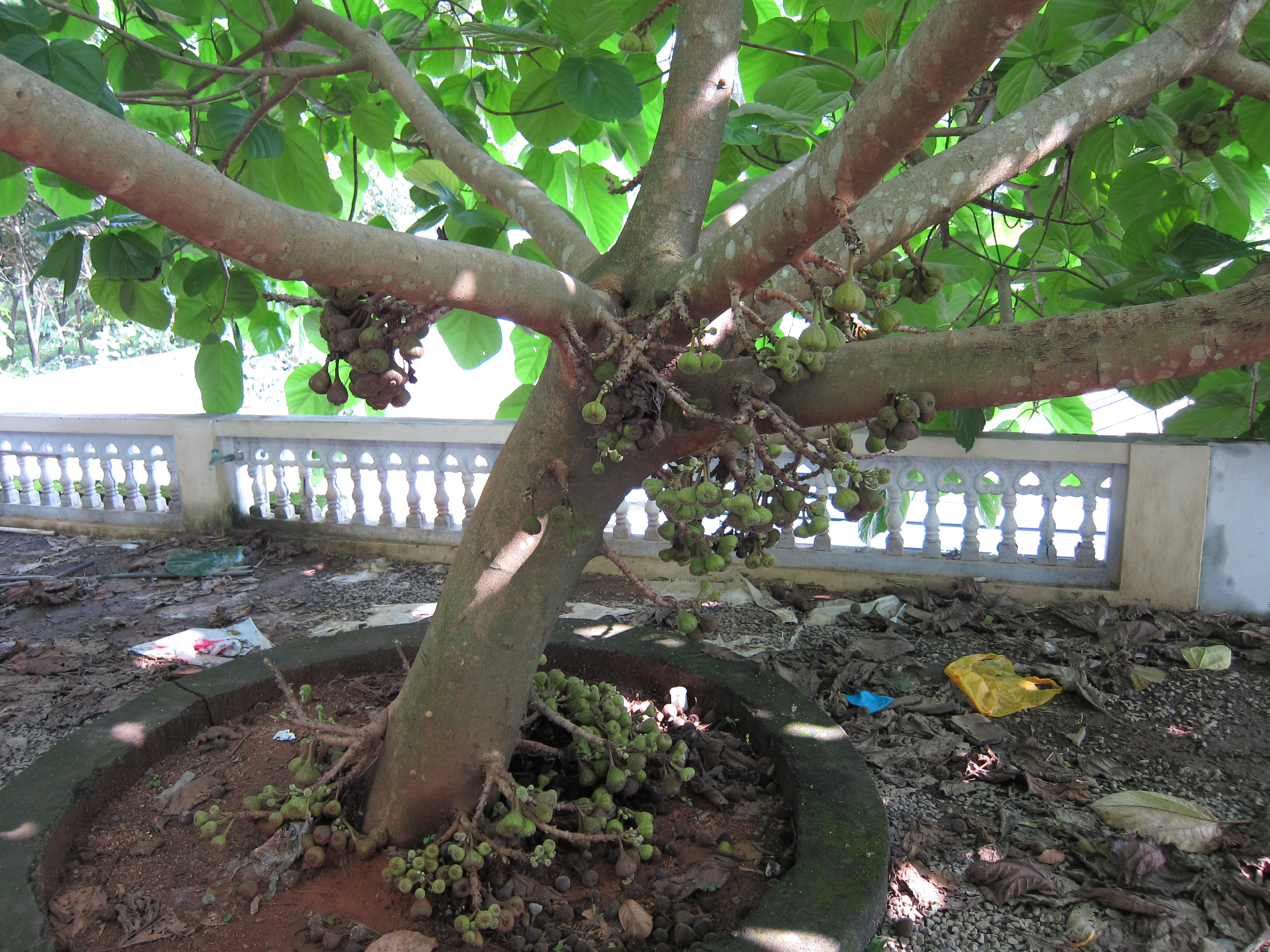
Fruit emerging from trunk and branches

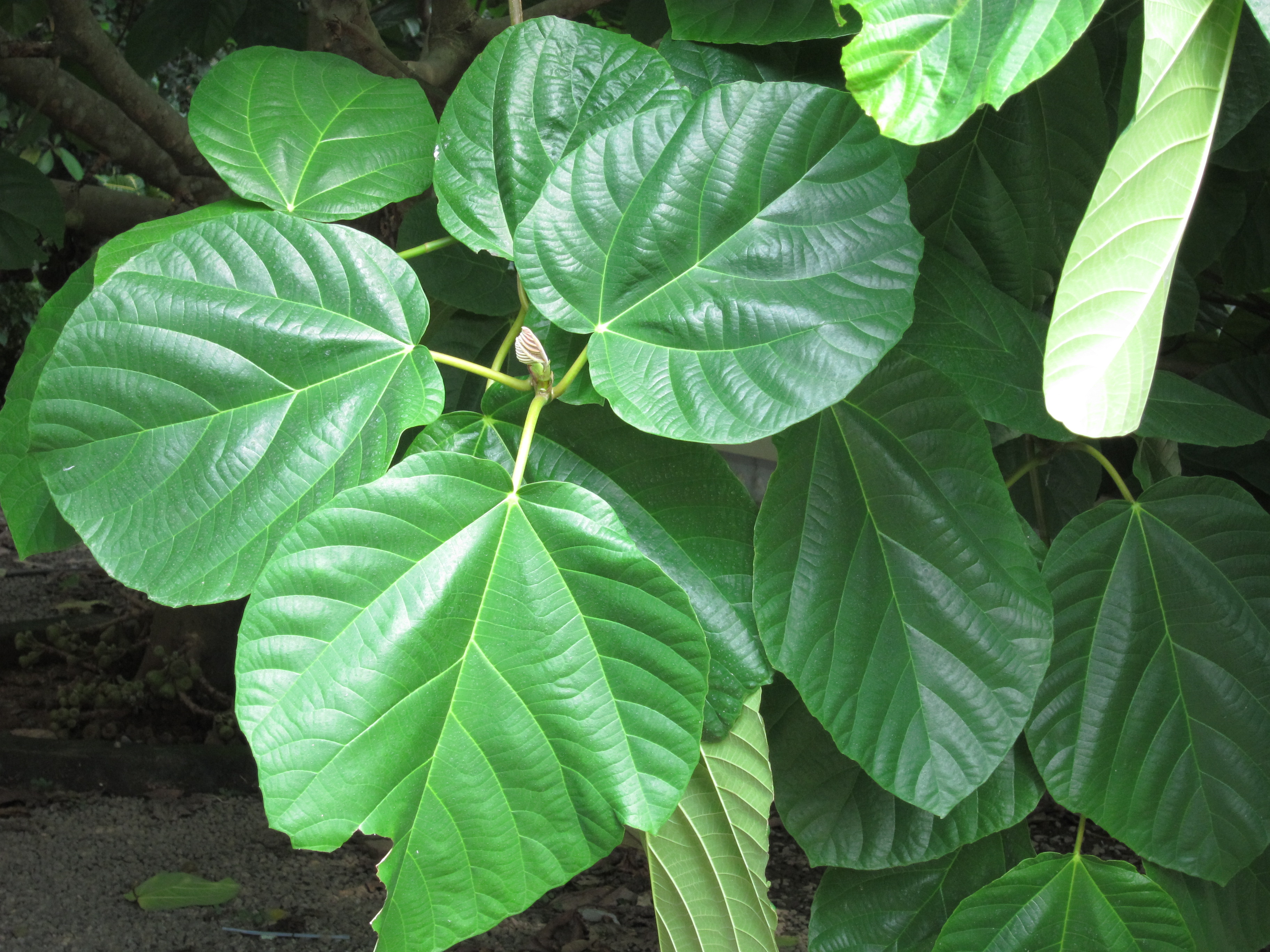
Leaf of elephant ear fig

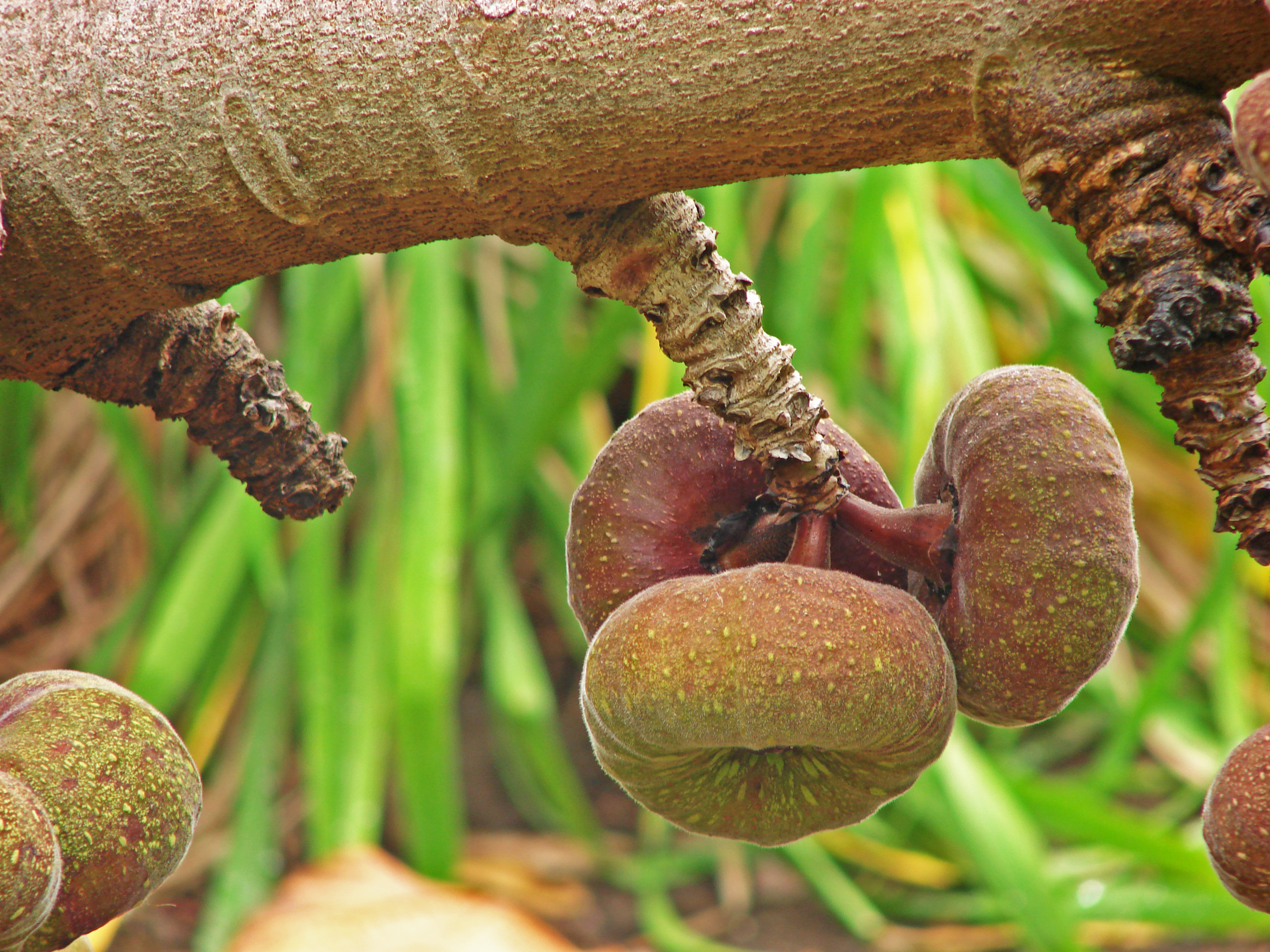
Fruit

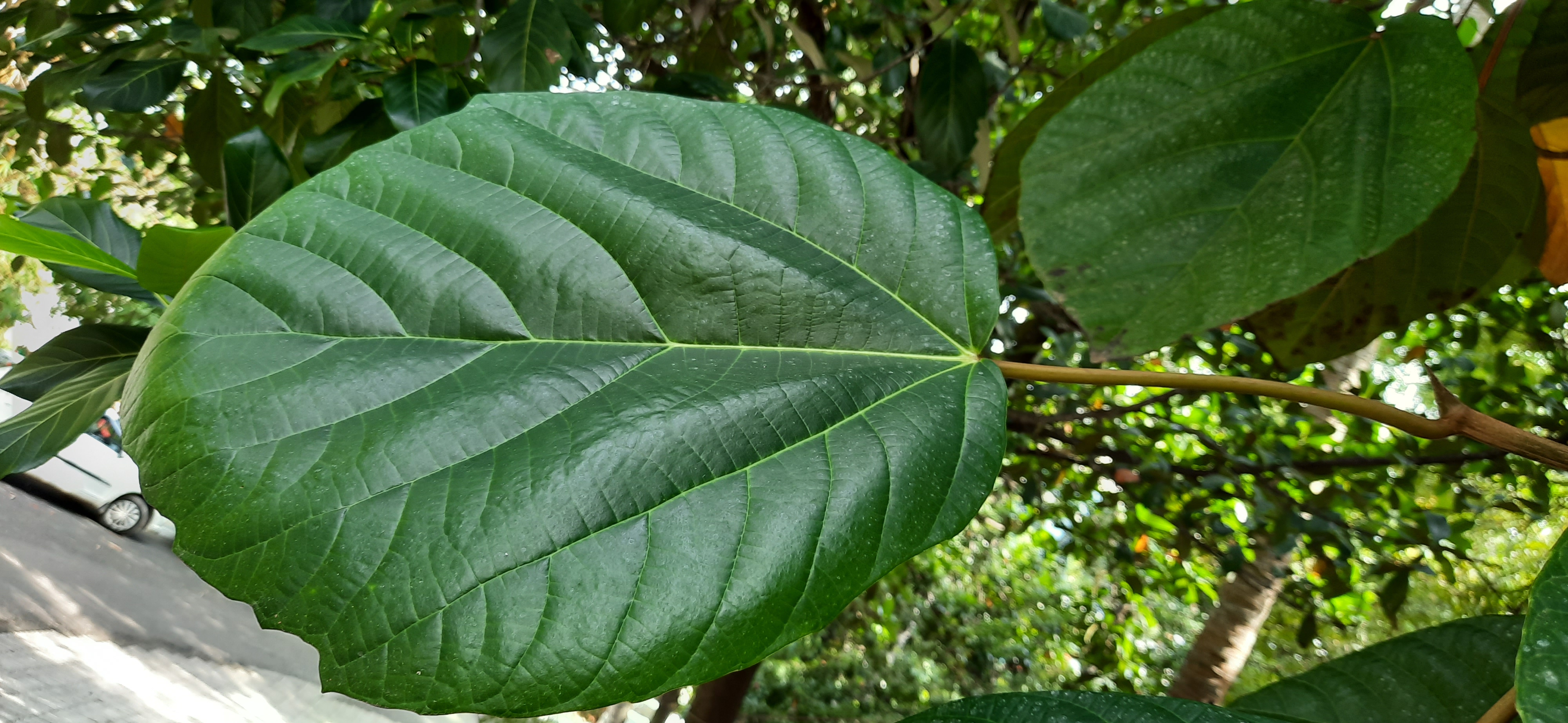
Leaf

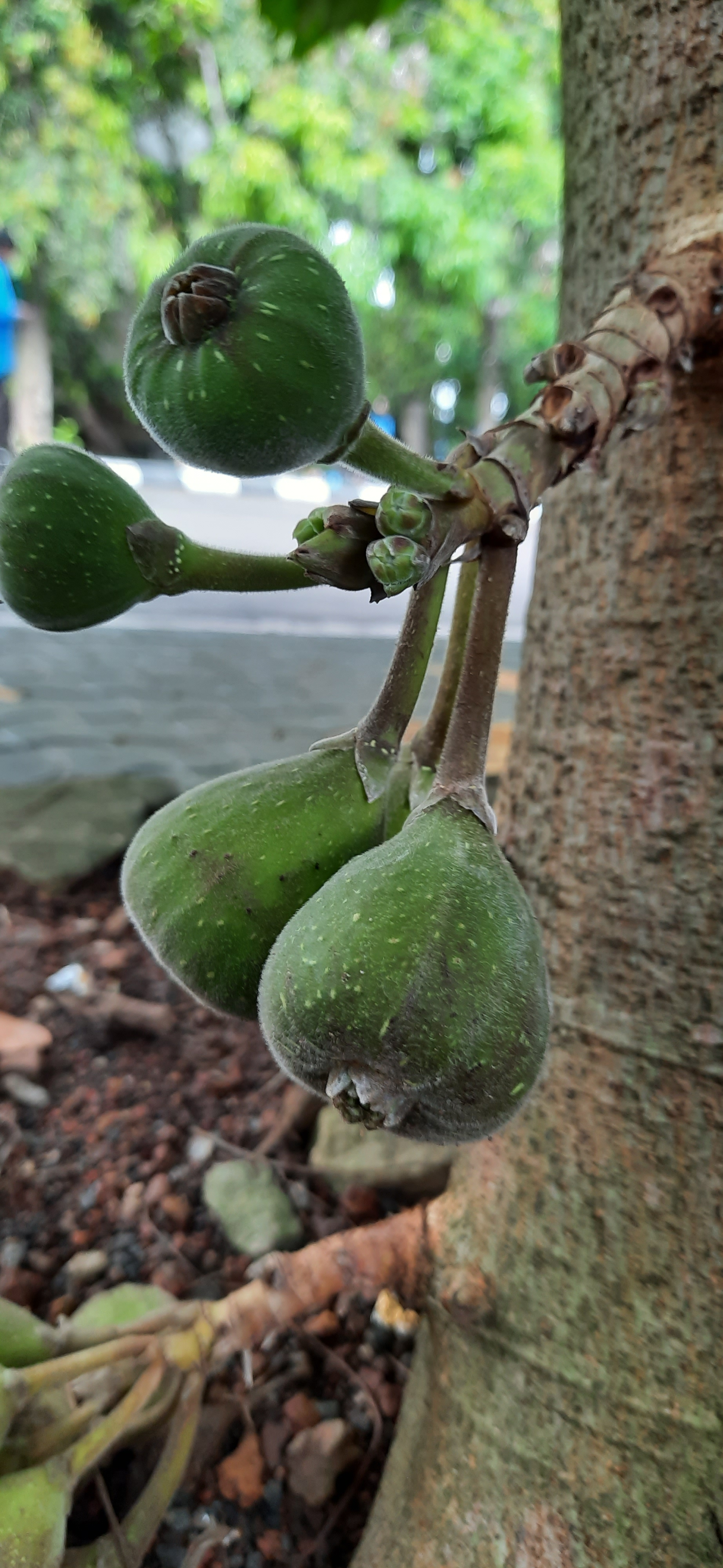
Fruit

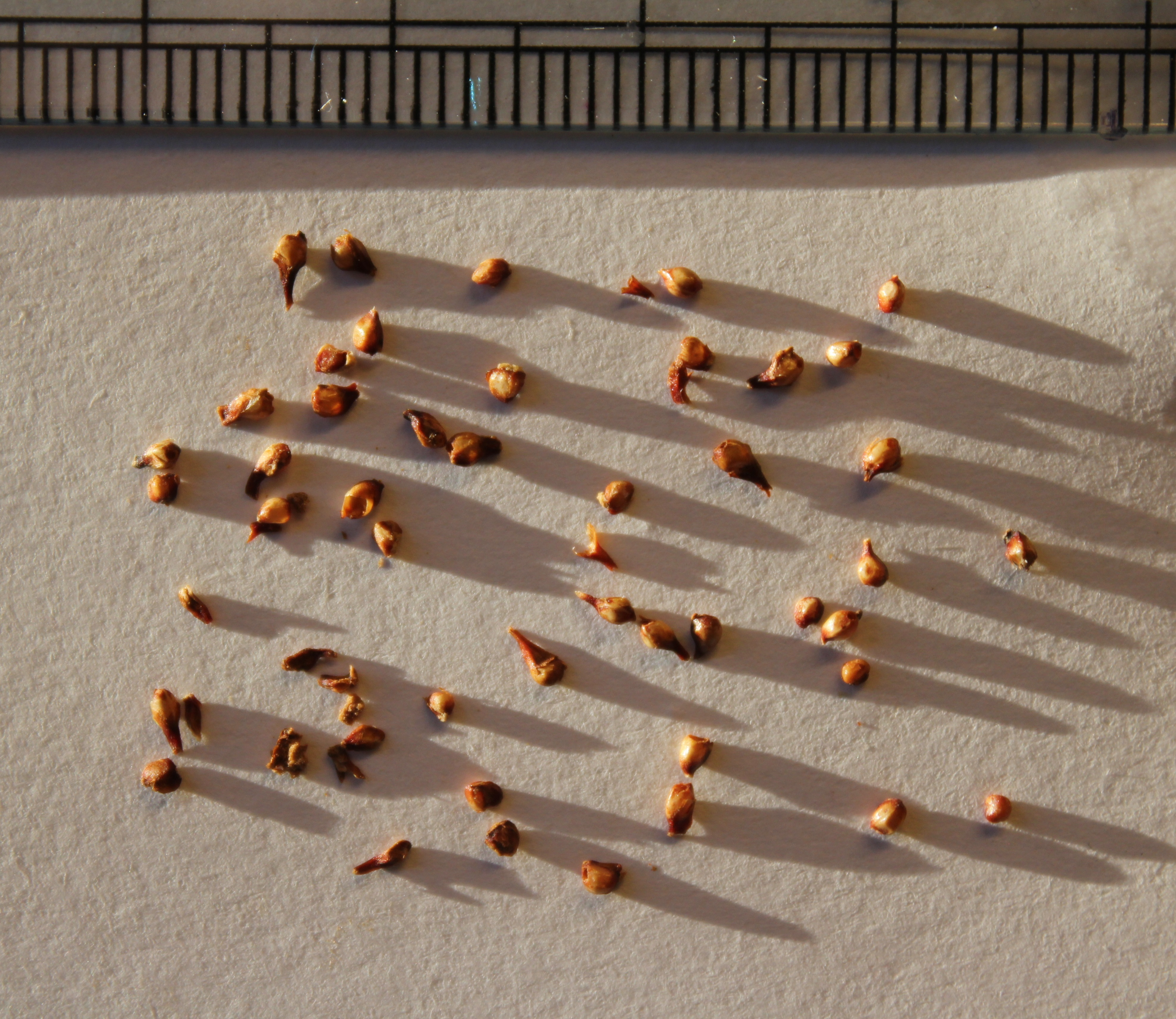
Seeds
