= Herodotia (wasp) =

Scientific classification
- Domain: Eukaryota
- Kingdom: Animalia
- Phylum: Arthropoda
- Class: Insecta
- Order: Hymenoptera
- Family: Epichrysomallidae
- Genus: Herodotia; Girault, 1931

Genus of wasps

Herodotia is a genus of wasps belonging to the family Epichrysomallidae.

The species of this genus are found in Australasia.

Species:

- Herodotia procopii Girault, 1931
- Herodotia subatriventris (Girault, 1923)
