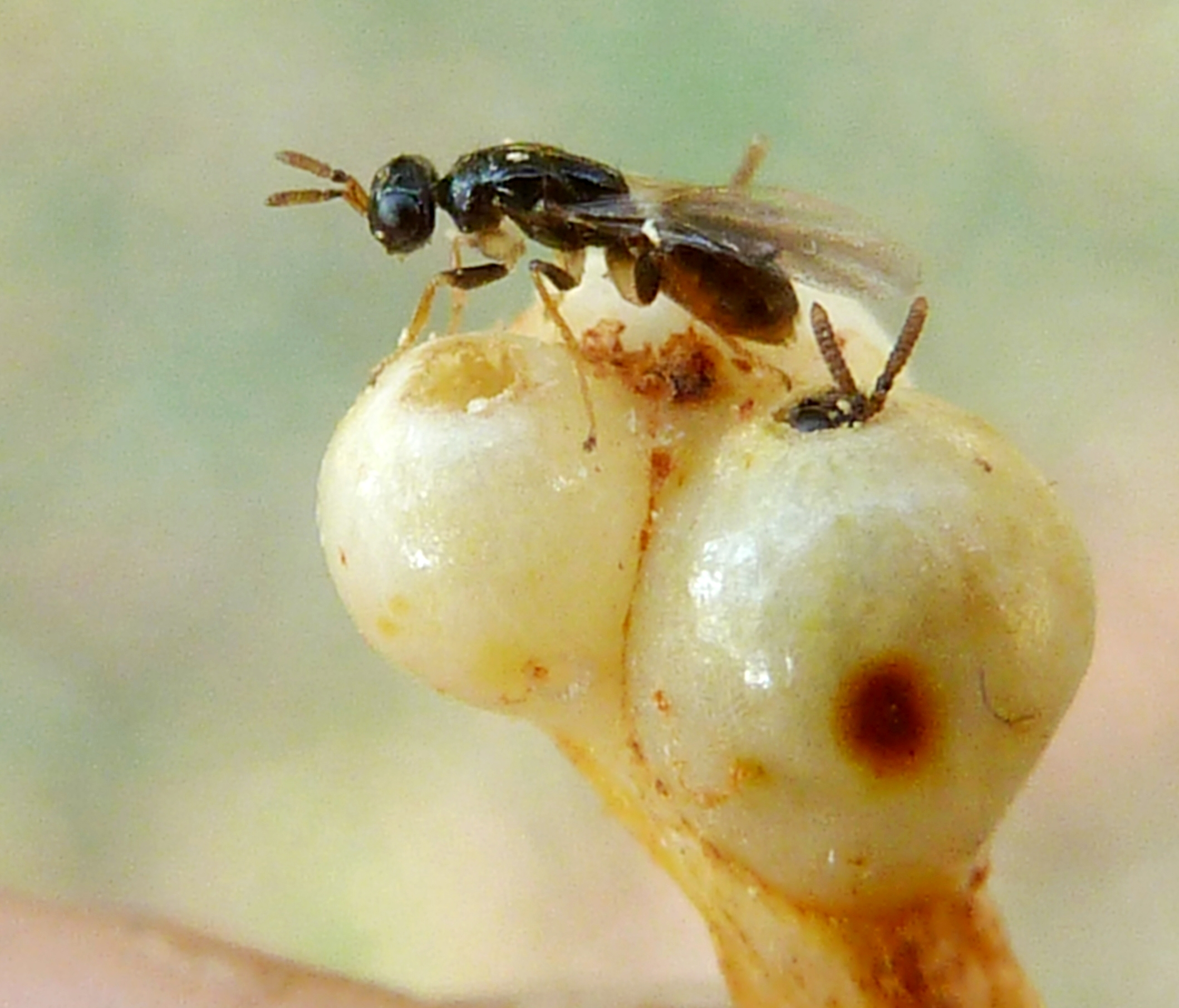
- Sycomacophila sp.

Scientific classification
- Domain: Eukaryota
- Kingdom: Animalia
- Phylum: Arthropoda
- Class: Insecta
- Order: Hymenoptera
- Superfamily: Chalcidoidea
- Family: Epichrysomallidae; Hill & Riek, 1967

Genera
- See text.

= Epichrysomallidae =

Family of wasps

Epichrysomallidae is a family of gall-forming wasps associated with fig trees (genus Ficus) - they make galls in figs, or on leaves or twigs. Once considered a subfamily of Pteromalidae (Epichrysomallinae), this group of genera has been elevated to family rank; they are now known to be more closely related to other gall-forming chalcid wasps than to pteromalids.

== Description ==
Antenna with 10–12 flagellomeres, including a small fourth clavomere. The labrum is flexible, and hidden behind the clypeus. Mandibles have three teeth. Notauli complete. In most genera, all legs have five tarsomeres, except for Odontofroggatia and Josephiella, which have four-segmented tarsi. The stigmal vein of the fore wing arises at a right angle and the postmarginal vein is shorter than the stigmal vein.

== Genera ==
- Acophila
- Asycobia
- Camarothorax
- Epichrysomalla
- Eufroggattisca
- Herodotia
- Josephiella
- Lachaisea
- Leeuweniella
- Meselatus
- Neosycophila
- Odontofroggatia
- Parasycobia
- Sycobia
- Sycobiomorphella
- Sycomacophila
- Sycophilodes
- Sycophilomorpha
- Sycotetra
