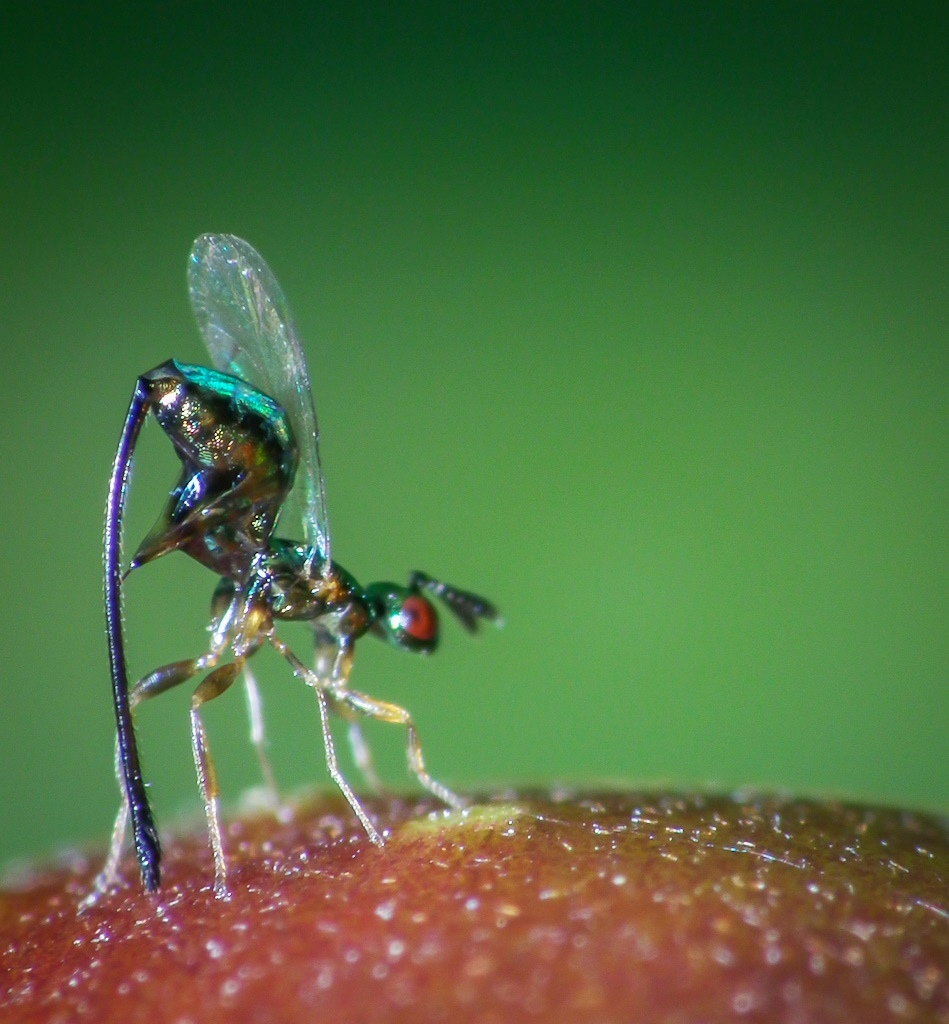
- Sycoscapter sp. female ovipositing
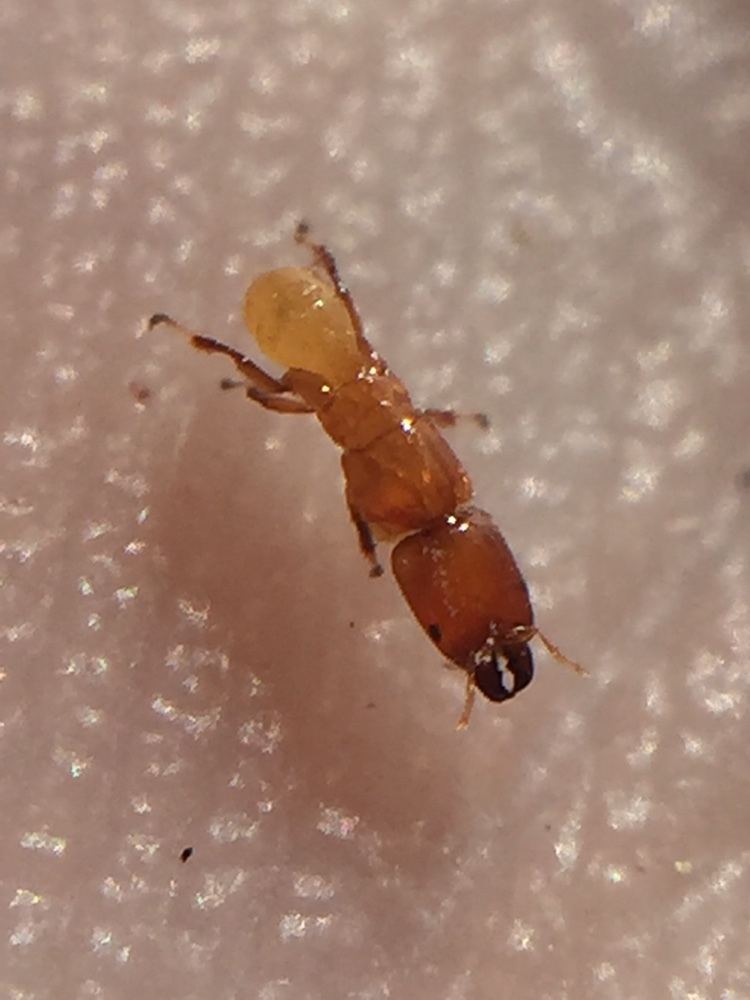
- Sycoscapter australis male from New Zealand

Scientific classification
- Kingdom: Animalia
- Phylum: Arthropoda
- Clade: Pancrustacea
- Class: Insecta
- Order: Hymenoptera
- Family: Pteromalidae
- Subfamily: Pteromalinae
- Tribe: Otitesellini
- Genus: Sycoscapter; Westwood, 1883

= Sycoscapter =

Genus of wasps

Sycoscapter is a genus of non-pollinating fig wasp which is native to the Afrotropical, Indomalayan and Australasian realms. They are parasitoids of fig wasps in the Ceratosolen, Eupristina and Kradibia genera.
