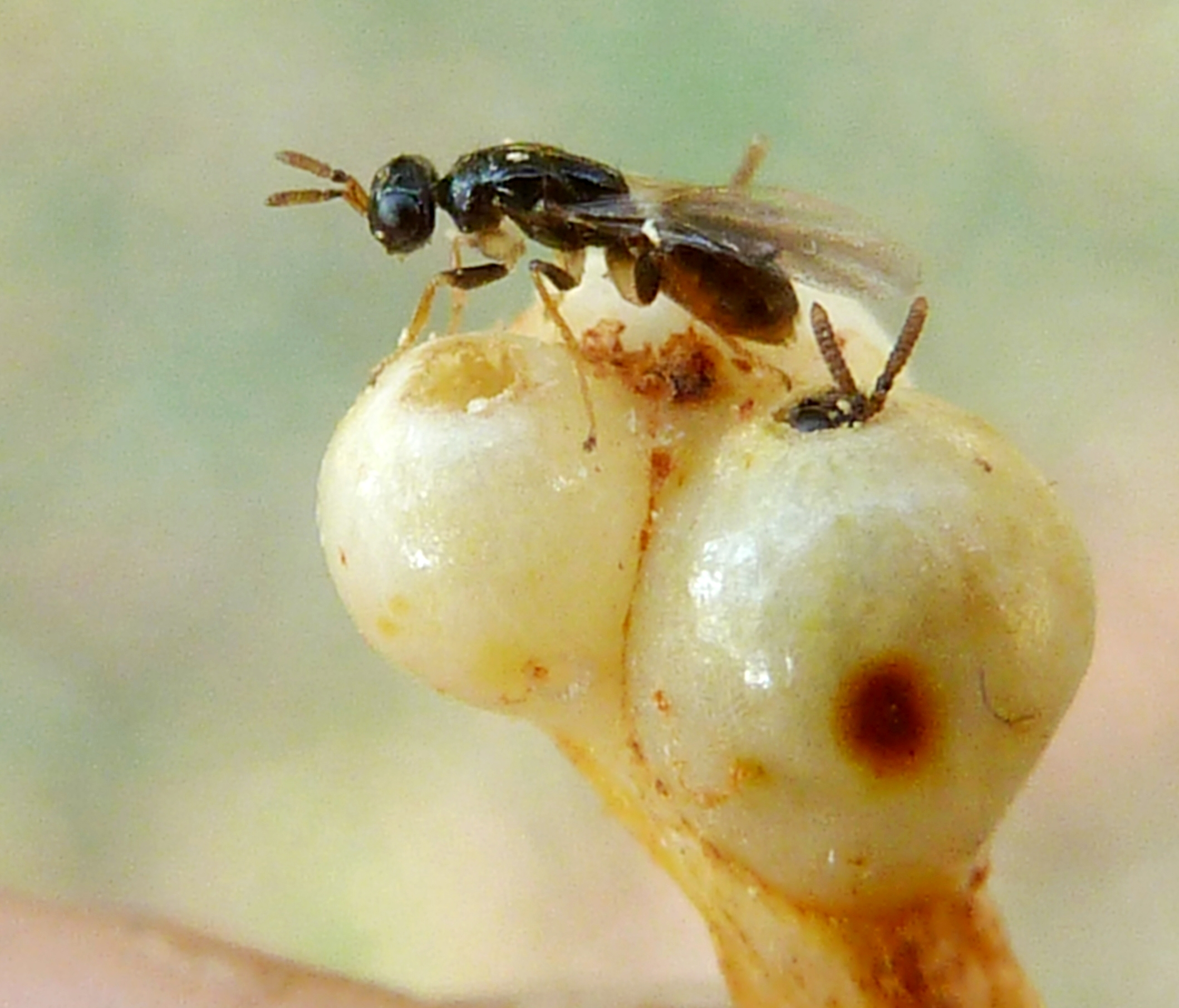
- Sycomacophila sp. on Ficus sur

Scientific classification
- Domain: Eukaryota
- Kingdom: Animalia
- Phylum: Arthropoda
- Class: Insecta
- Order: Hymenoptera
- Family: Epichrysomallidae
- Genus: Sycomacophila; Rasplus, 2003

Type species
- Sycomacophila carolae Rasplus, 2003

Species
- See text

= Sycomacophila =

Genus of wasps

Sycomacophila is an Afrotropical genus of gall wasps that live on the monoecious fig subgenus, Sycomorus.

== Species ==
The described species include:

- Sycomacophila carolae Rasplus, 2003
- Sycomacophila gibernaui Rasplus, 2003
- Sycomacophila montana Rasplus, 2003
