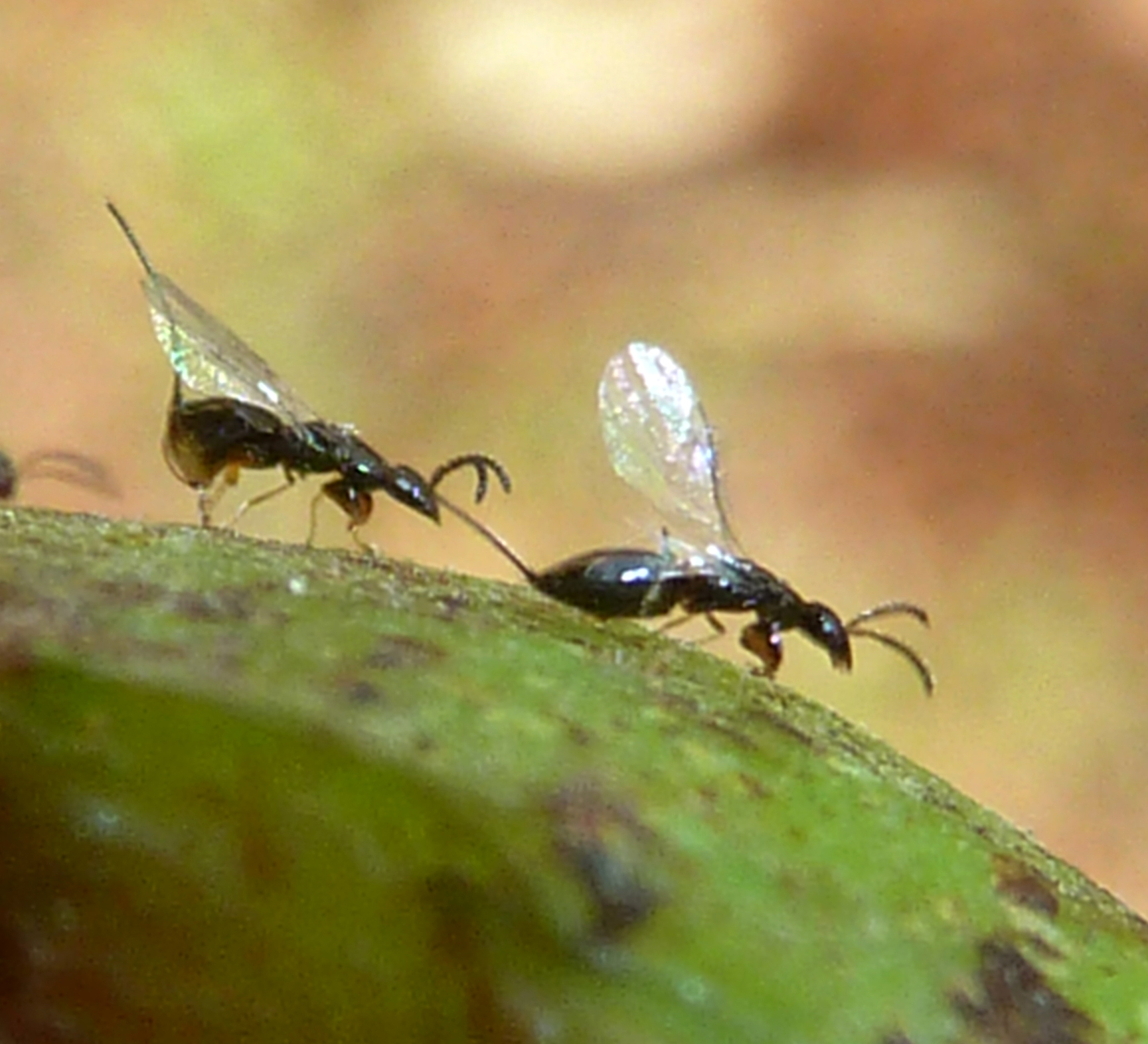
- Sycophaga sp., adult females on F. sur

Scientific classification
- Kingdom: Animalia
- Phylum: Arthropoda
- Class: Insecta
- Order: Hymenoptera
- Family: Pteromalidae
- Subfamily: Sycophaginae
- Genus: Sycophaga; Westwood, 1840

Type species
- Sycophaga sycomori (Linnaeus, 1758)

Species
- See text

= Sycophaga =

Genus of wasps

Sycophaga is a mainly Afrotropical genus of fig wasps that live on the section Sycomorus of the monoecious fig subgenus, Sycomorus, and one of several fig wasp genera to exploit its mutualism with Ceratosolen wasps.

They enter the fig during the receptive phase of development, and oviposit inside the short-style flowers. This induces the growth of endosperm tissue and the enlargement and ripening of the syconium which holds the wasp-bearing drupelets, without pollination taking place.

The genus can be characterized by having a long ovipositor, non-metallic coloration, a square mesoscutellum, and a long propodeum.

== Species ==
The described species include:

- Sycophaga afflicta Grandi, 1916
- Sycophaga callani Grandi, 1955
- Sycophaga cyclostigma Waterston, 1916
- Sycophaga depressa Risbec, 1956
- Sycophaga gigantea Grandi, 1916
- Sycophaga gigas Mayr, 1906
- Sycophaga insularis Grandi, 1916
- Sycophaga silvestrii Grandi, 1916
- Sycophaga sycomori Linnaeus, 1758
- Sycophaga tenebrosa Grandi, 1917
- Sycophaga valentinae Grandi, 1952
- Sycophaga vicina Mayr, 1906
- Sycophaga viduata Grandi, 1916
