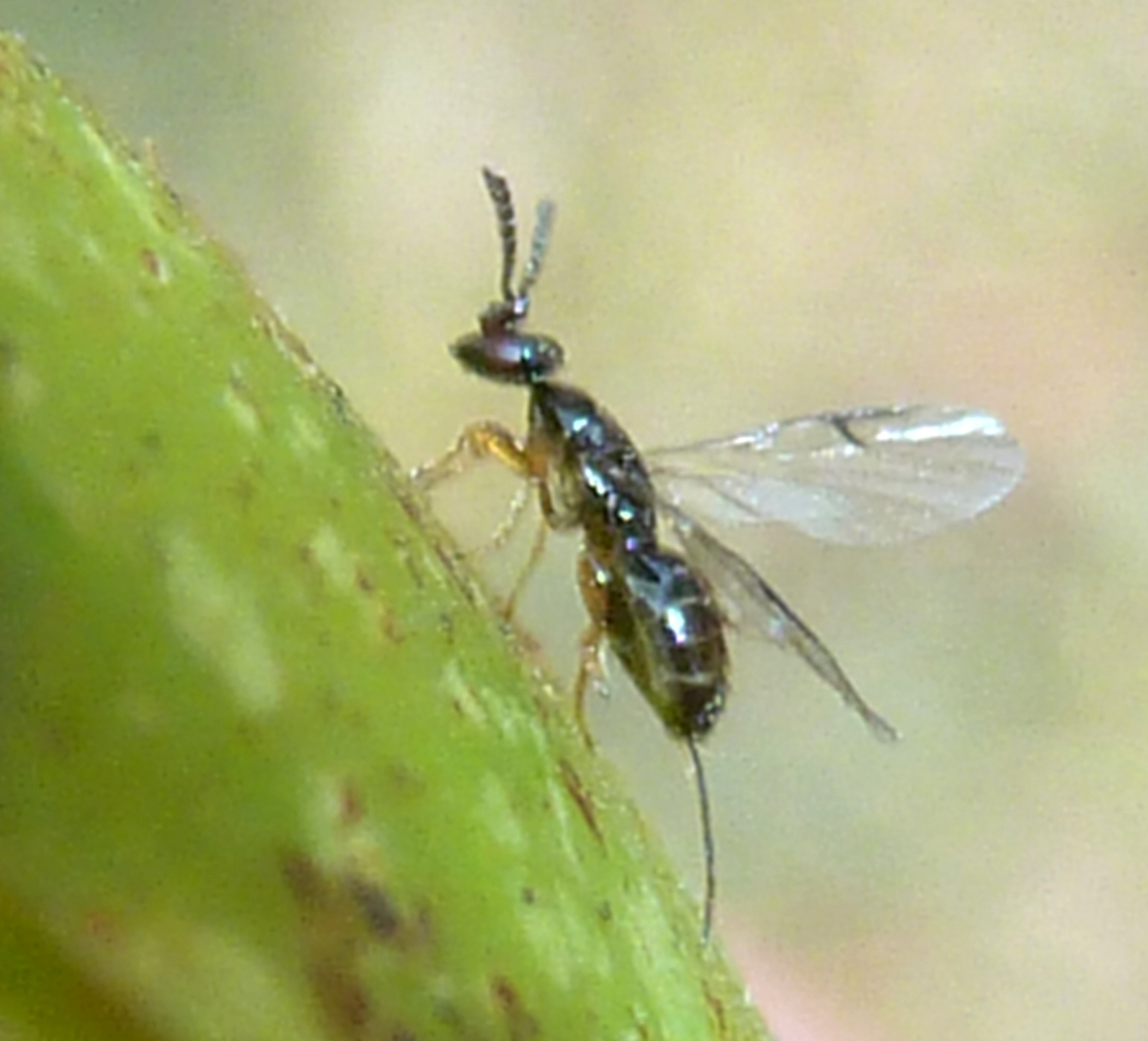
- C. capensis, adult female

Scientific classification
- Kingdom: Animalia
- Phylum: Arthropoda
- Class: Insecta
- Order: Hymenoptera
- Family: Agaonidae
- Subfamily: Kradibiinae
- Genus: Ceratosolen; Mayr, 1885

Type species
- Blastophaga appendiculata (Mayr, 1885)

Species
- See text

= Ceratosolen =

Genus of wasps

Ceratosolen is an Old World wasp genus in the family Agaonidae (fig wasps). They are pollinators of the monoecious fig subsections Sycomorus and Sycocarpus, and the section Neomorphe, all belonging to the subgenus Sycomorus. The genus is native to the Palearctic, Afrotropical, Indomalayan and Australasian realms.

== Biology ==
Adults enter through the fig ostiole, a narrow, bract-lined passage, then pollinate and attempt to oviposit on the flowers. Flower ovules that receive an egg become galled and the larvae consume the gall tissue. Pollinated flowers missed by the wasps produce one seed each. The adult offspring emerge from the gall and mate in the fig, before the winged female wasps disperse, carrying the flower pollen with them.

== Associations ==
Several non-pollinating wasp species of the Chalcidoidea exploit the mutualism. Sycophaga sycomori oviposits inside the short-style flowers, thereby stimulating the growth of endosperm tissue and the enlargement and ripening of the syconium which holds the wasp-bearing drupelets, without pollination taking place. The parasitic species Apocrypta guineensis and Sycoscapter niger use long ovipositors to pierce the fig wall to infect the larvae during their development inside the flower galls, and consequently reduce pollinator production.

== Species ==
There are more than 60 described species, including:

- Ceratosolen abnormis Wiebes, 1963
- Ceratosolen acutatus Mayr, 1906
- Ceratosolen adenospermae Wiebes, 1965
- Ceratosolen albulus Wiebes, 1963
- Ceratosolen appendiculatus (Mayr, 1885)
- Ceratosolen arabicus Mayr, 1906
- Ceratosolen armipes Wiebes, 1963
- Ceratosolen bakeri Grandi, 1927
- Ceratosolen bianchii Wiebes, 1963
- Ceratosolen bimerus Wiebes, 1965
- Ceratosolen fusciceps (Mayr, 1885)
- Ceratosolen solmsi (Mayr, 1885)
- Ceratosolen solomensis Wiebes, 1994
- Ceratosolen sordidus Wiebes, 1963
- Ceratosolen stupefactus Wiebes, 1989
- Ceratosolen vechti Wiebes, 1963
- Ceratosolen vetustus Wiebes, 1994
- Ceratosolen vissali Wiebes, 1981
- Ceratosolen wui Chen & Chou, 1997
