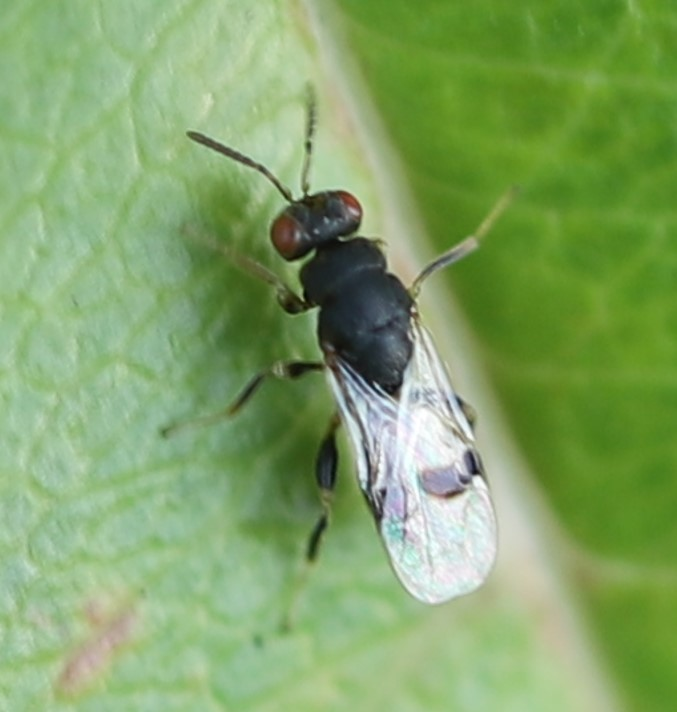
- Sycophila biguttata

Scientific classification
- Kingdom: Animalia
- Phylum: Arthropoda
- Class: Insecta
- Order: Hymenoptera
- Family: Eurytomidae
- Subfamily: Eurytominae
- Genus: Sycophila; Walker, 1871

Type species
- Sycophila decatomoides Walker, 1871

Species
- See text

= Sycophila =

Genus of wasps

Sycophila is a genus of wasps in the family Eurytomidae. Species of the genus associate with figs and galls of various insects such as gall wasps and gall midges. It can be distinguished from other eurytomid genera by the elongate petiole, the gaster often being laterally compressed, and the forewing having a broadened marginal vein and dark brown maculae. Sycophila has a cosmopolitan distribution.

== Species ==
There are currently around 120 described species.
