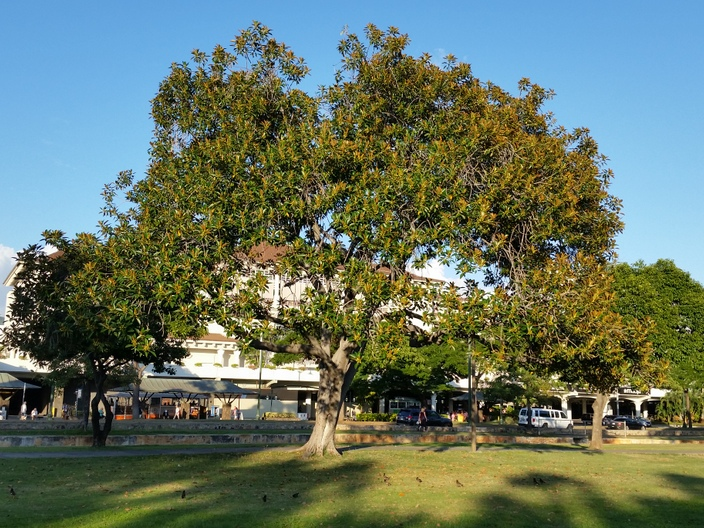

Conservation status
- Least Concern (IUCN 3.1)

Scientific classification
- Kingdom: Plantae
- Clade: Embryophytes
- Clade: Tracheophytes
- Clade: Spermatophytes
- Clade: Angiosperms
- Clade: Eudicots
- Clade: Rosids
- Order: Rosales
- Family: Moraceae
- Genus: Ficus
- Species: F. rubiginosa

Binomial name
- Ficus rubiginosa Desf. ex Vent.
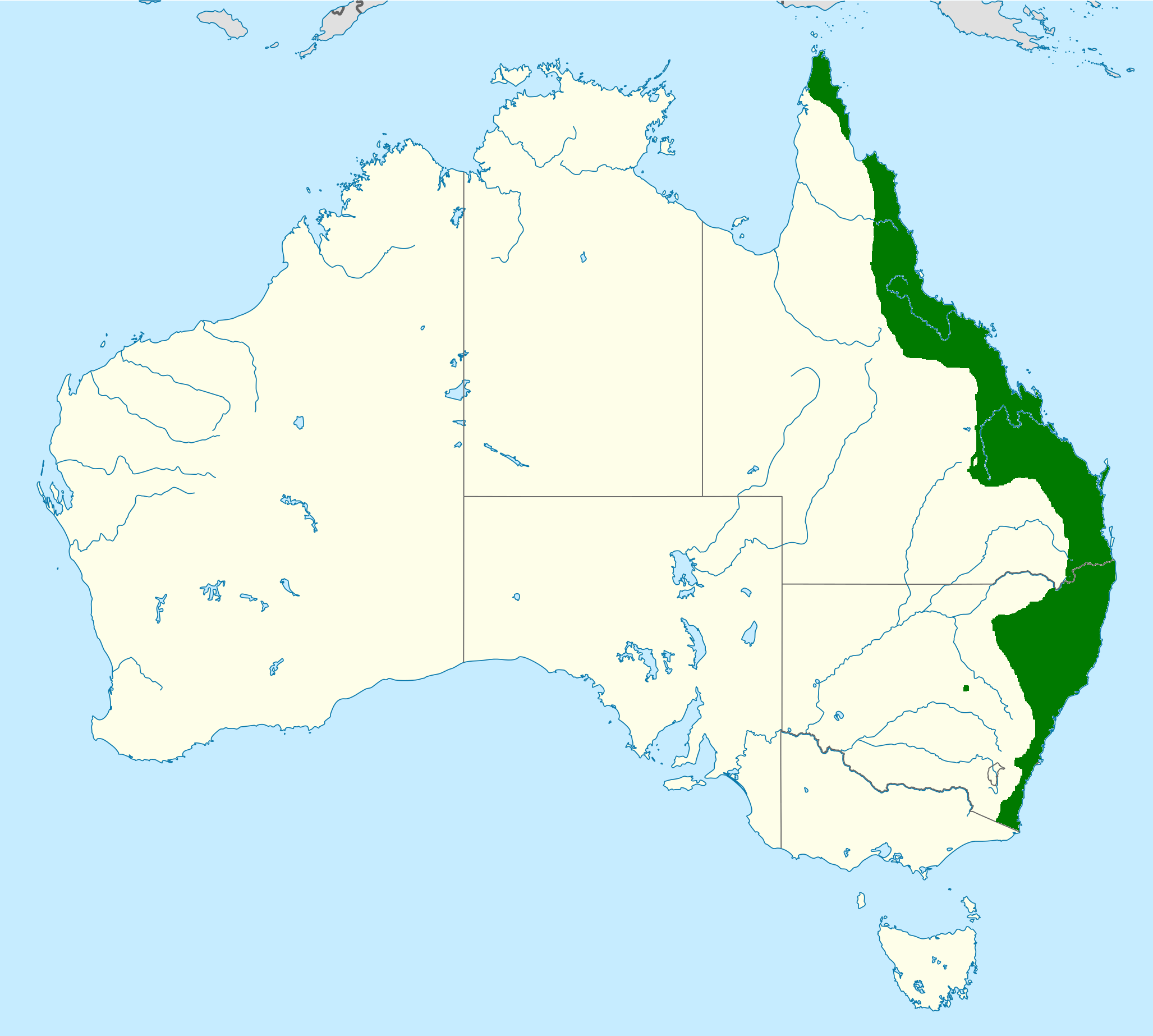
- Range in Eastern Australia (in green)

Synonyms
- 25 synonyms: Mastosuke rubiginosa (Desf. ex Vent.) Raf.; Urostigma rubiginosum (Desf. ex Vent.) Gasp.; Ficus australis Willd.; Ficus baileyana Domin; Ficus ferruginea Desf.; Ficus ferruginea (Miq.) Miq.; Ficus fulva Kunth & C.D.Bouché; Ficus leichhardtii (Miq.) Miq.; Ficus leichhardtii var. angustata Miq.; Ficus macrophylla var. pubescens F.M.Bailey; Ficus muelleri (Miq.) Miq.; Ficus novae-walliae Dum.Cours.; Ficus obliqua var. petiolaris (Benth.) Corner; Ficus platypoda var. leichhardtii (Miq.) R.J.F.Hend.; Ficus platypoda var. mollis Benth.; Ficus platypoda var. petiolaris Benth.; Ficus platypoda var. subacuminata Benth.; Ficus rubiginosa var. glabrescens F.M.Bailey; Ficus rubiginosa f. glabrescens (F.M.Bailey) D.J.Dixon; Ficus rubiginosa var. lucida Maiden; Ficus shirleyana Domin; Perula rubiginosa Raf.; Urostigma ferrugineum Miq.; Urostigma leichhardtii Miq.; Urostigma muelleri Miq.

= Ficus rubiginosa =

Species of flowering plant

Ficus rubiginosa, the rusty fig or Port Jackson fig (damun in the Dharug language), is a species of flowering plant in the genus Ficus native to eastern Australia. Beginning as a seedling that grows on other plants (hemiepiphyte) or rocks (lithophyte), F. rubiginosa matures into a tree 30 m (100 ft) high and nearly as wide with a yellow-brown buttressed trunk. The leaves are oval and glossy green and measure from 4 to 19.3 cm (1 1/2–7 1/2 in) long and 1.25 to 13.2 cm (1/2–5 1/4 in) wide.

The fruits are small, round, and yellow, and can ripen and turn red at any time of year, peaking in spring and summer. Like all figs, the fruit is in the form of a syconium, an inverted inflorescence with the flowers lining an internal cavity. F. rubiginosa is exclusively pollinated by the fig wasp species Pleistodontes imperialis, which may comprise four cryptospecies. The syconia are also home to another fourteen species of wasp, some of which induce galls while others parasitise the pollinator wasps and at least two species of nematode. Many species of bird, including pigeons, parrots, and various passerines, eat the fruit. Ranging along the Australian east coast from Queensland to Bega in southern New South Wales (including the Port Jackson area, leading to its alternative name), F. rubiginosa grows in rainforest margins and rocky outcrops. It is used as a shade tree in parks and public spaces, and when potted is well-suited for use as an indoor plant or in bonsai.

== Taxonomy ==
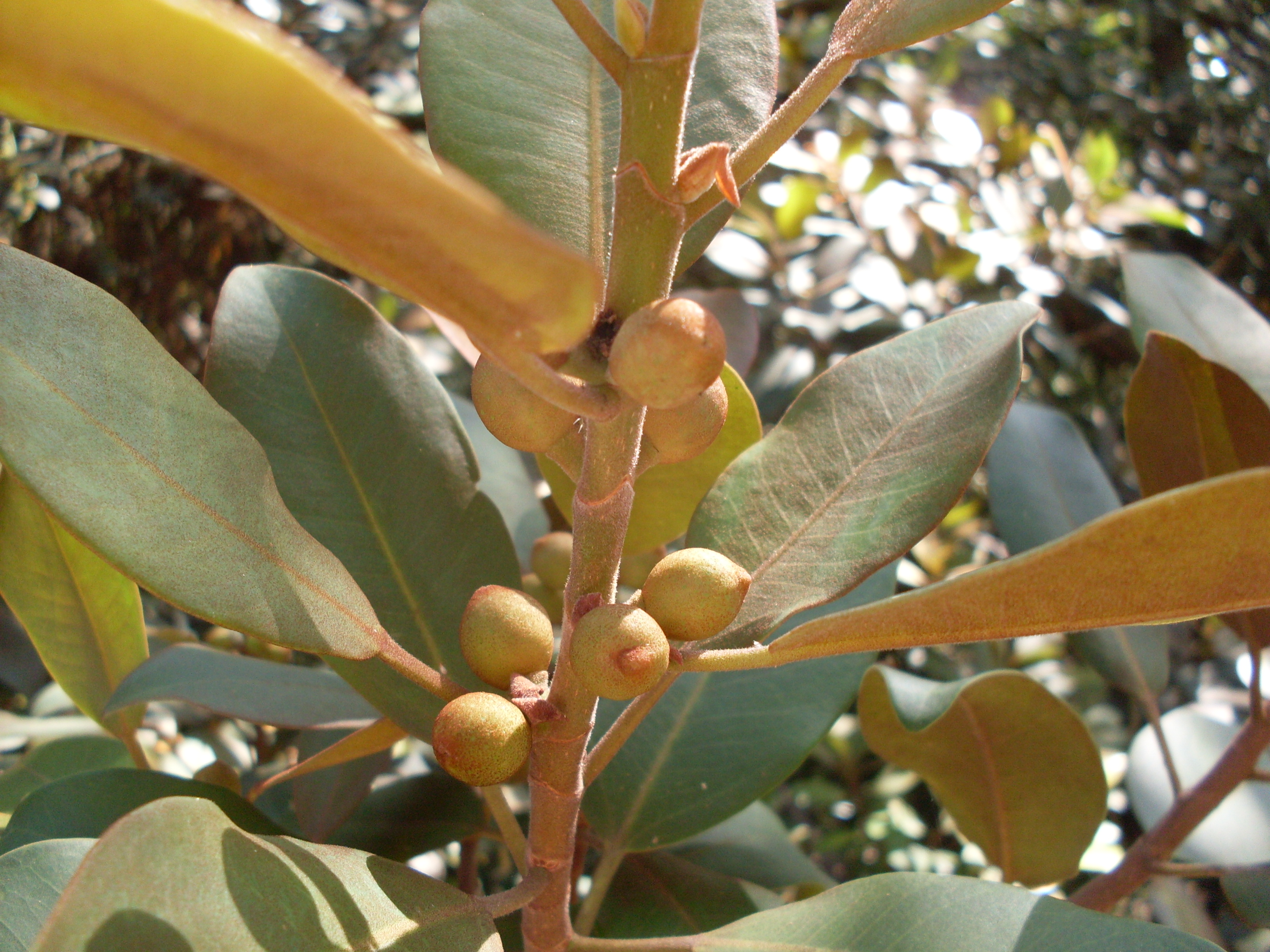
Ficus rubiginosa figs (syconia) and the rusty undersides of the leaves

Ficus rubiginosa was described by French botanist René Louiche Desfontaines in 1804, from a type specimen whose locality is documented simply as "New Holland". In searching for the type specimen, Australian botanist Dale Dixon found one from the herbarium of Desfontaines at Florence Herbarium and one from the herbarium of Étienne Pierre Ventenat at Geneva. As Ventenat had used Desfontaines' name, Dixon selected the Florence specimen to be the type in 2001. The specific epithet rubiginosa related to the rusty coloration of the undersides of the leaves. Indeed, rusty fig is an alternate common name; others include Illawarra fig and Port Jackson fig. It was known as damun (pron. "tam-mun") to the Eora and Darug inhabitants of the Sydney basin.

In 1806, German botanist Carl Ludwig Willdenow gave it the botanical name Ficus australis in Species Plantarum, but this is a nomen illegitimum as the species already had a validly published name. Italian botanist Guglielmo Gasparrini broke up the genus Ficus in 1844, placing the species in the genus Urostigma as U. rubiginosum. In 1862, Dutch botanist Friedrich Anton Wilhelm Miquel described Urostigma leichhardtii from material collected from Cape Cleveland, Queensland, noting it had affinities to F. rubiginosa. In 1867, he placed Urostigma as a subgenus in the reunited Ficus, which resulted in the taxon becoming Ficus leichhardtii. Miquel also described Ficus leichhardtii variety angustata from Whitsunday Island, later classified as F. shirleyana by Czech botanist Karel Domin. Queensland state botanist Frederick Manson Bailey described Ficus macrophylla variety pubescens in 1911 from Queensland, Domin later renaming it Ficus baileyana. All these taxa were found to be indistinguishable from (and hence reclassified as) F. rubiginosa by Dixon in 2001.

In a study published in 2008, Nina Rønsted and colleagues analysed the DNA sequences from the nuclear ribosomal internal and external transcribed spacers, and the glyceraldehyde 3-phosphate dehydrogenase region, in the first molecular analysis of the section Malvanthera. They found F. rubiginosa to be most closely related to the rainforest species F. watkinsiana and two rock-growing (lithophytic) species of arid northern Australia (F. atricha and F. brachypoda). They classified these species in a new series Rubiginosae in the subsection Platypodeae. Relationships are unclear and it is uncertain into which direction the group radiated (into rainforest or into arid Australia).

Joseph Maiden described variety lucida in 1902, and Bailey described variety glabrescens in 1913. Both had diagnosed their varieties on the basis of their hairlessness. Maiden described a taxon totally devoid of hair, while Bailey described his as nearly glabrous (hairless). As Bailey's description more closely matched Dixon's findings (that these variants were only partly and not completely hairless), Dixon retained Bailey's name and reclassified it as Ficus rubiginosa forma glabrescens in 2001 as it differed only in the lack of hairs on new growth from the nominate form.

== Description ==
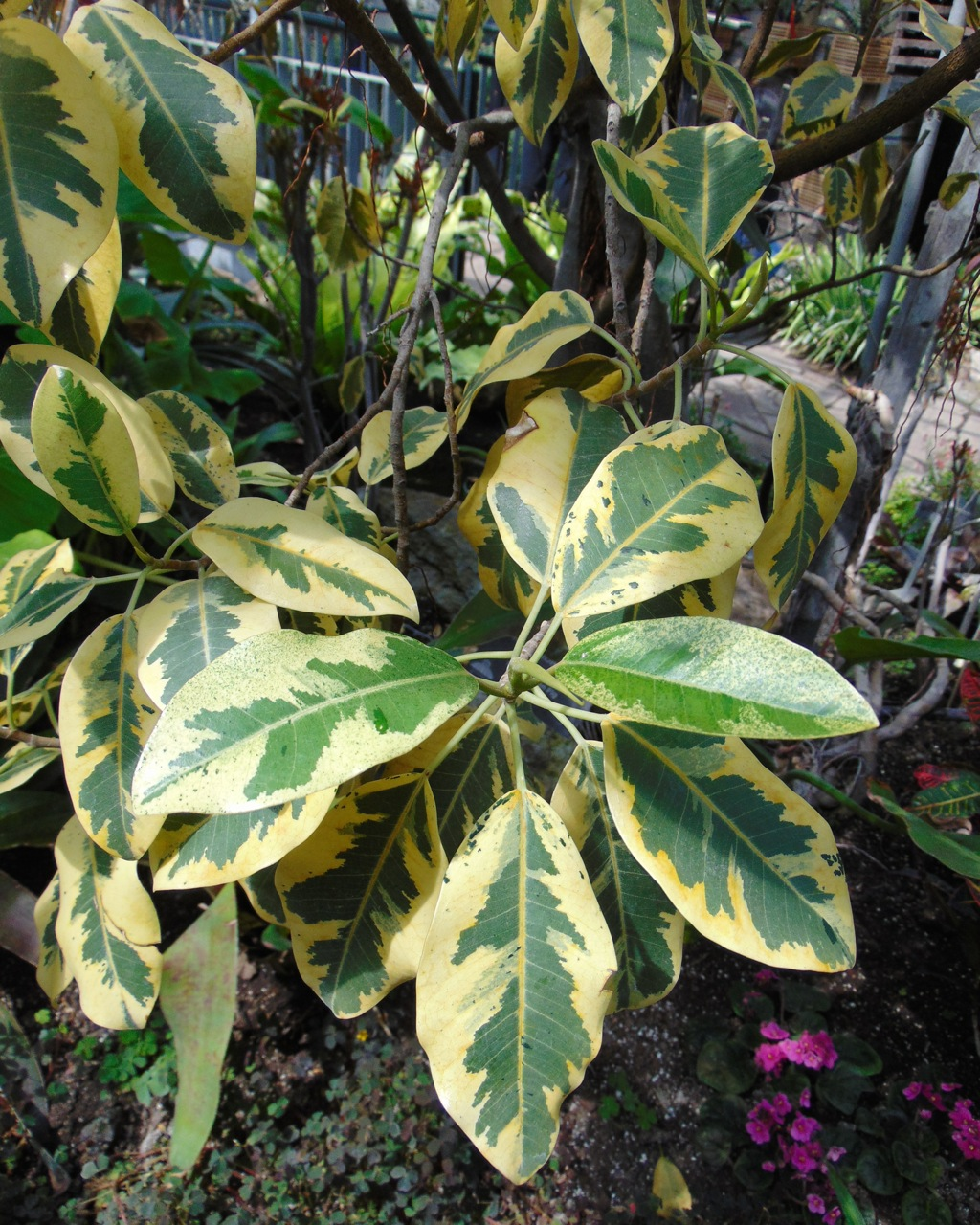
Variegated foliage of a cultivar

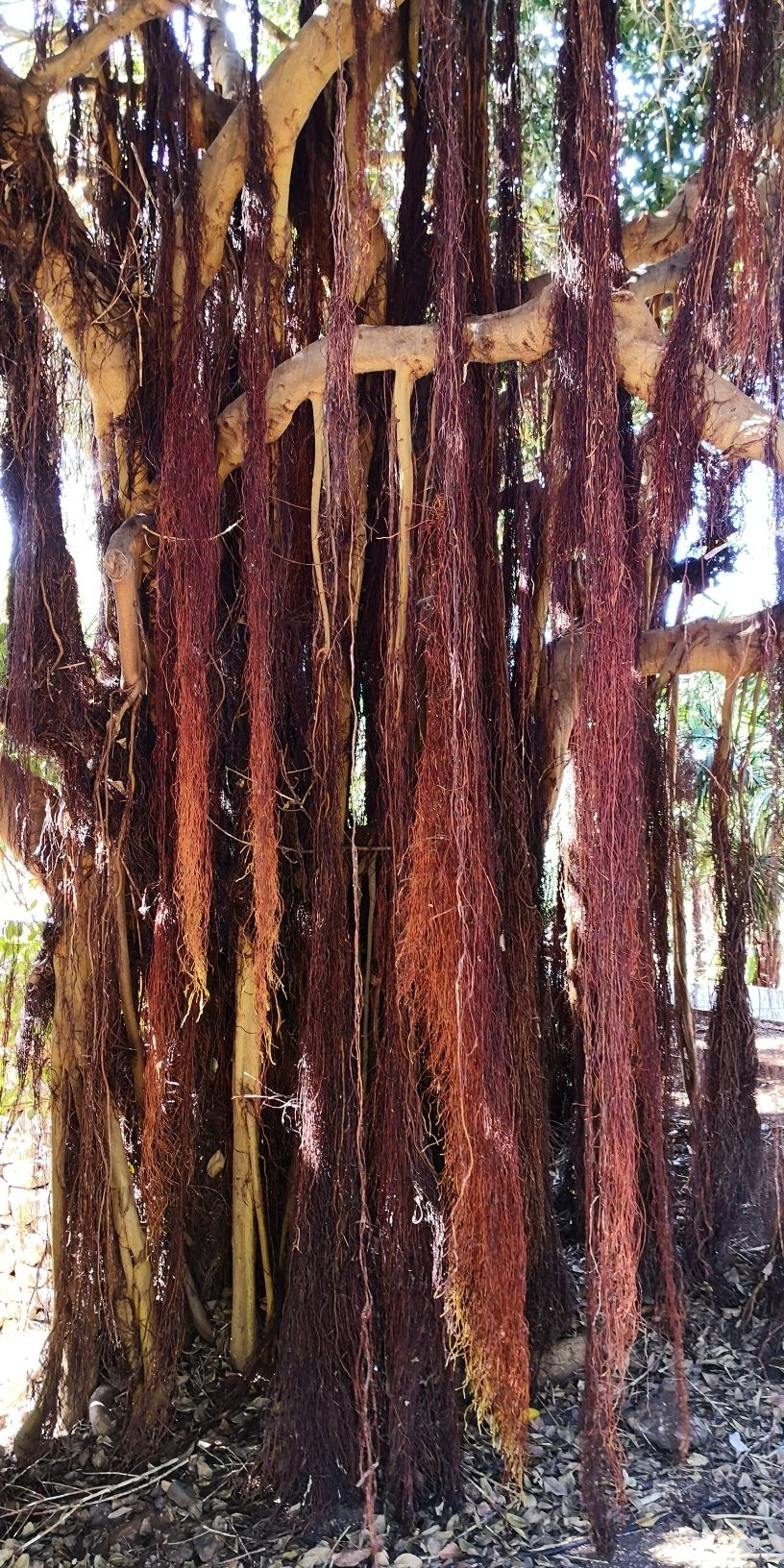
Stem with bark and aerial roots

A spreading, densely-shading tree when mature, F. rubiginosa may reach 30 m (100 ft) or more in height, although it rarely exceeds 10 m (30 ft) in the Sydney region.

The trunk is buttressed and can reach 1.5 m (4 ft 11 in) in diameter. The bark is yellow-brown. It can also grow as on other plants as a hemiepiphyte, or 1–5 m (3–16 ft) high lithophyte.

Alternately arranged on the stems, the ovate (egg-shaped), obovate (reverse egg-shaped) or oval-shaped leaves are anywhere from 4–19.3 cm (1 5/8–7 5/8 in) long and 1.25–13.2 cm (1/2–5 1/4 in) wide, on 7–8.2 cm (2 3/4–3 1/4 in)-long petioles (stalks that join the leaves to stems). They are smooth or bear tiny rusty hairs. There are 16 to 62 pairs of lateral veins that run off the midvein at an angle of 41.5–84.0°, while distinct basal veins run off the midvein at an angle of 18.5–78.9°.

As with all figs, the fruit (fig) is actually an inverted inflorescence (compound flower) known as a syconium, with tiny flowers arising from the fig's inner surface into a hollow cavity. F. rubiginosa is monoecious—both male and female flowers are found on the same plant, and in fact in the same fruit, although they mature at different times. Often growing in pairs, the figs are yellow initially and measure 4–10 mm (1/8–3/8 in) across. Ripening to red in colour, they are tipped with a small nipple and on a 2–5 mm (1/8–1/4 in) stalk. Fruits ripen throughout the year, although more so in spring and summer. Some trees have ripe and unripe fruit at the same time.

It closely resembles its relative, the Moreton Bay fig (F. macrophylla). Having similar ranges in the wild, they are often confused.

The smaller leaves, shorter fruit stalks, and rusty colour of the undersides of the leaves of F. rubiginosa are the easiest distinguishing features. It is also confused with the small-leaved fig (F. obliqua), the syconia of which are smaller, measuring 4–12 mm long and 4–11 mm in diameter, compared with 7–17 mm long and 8–17 mm diameter for F. rubiginosa.

== Distribution and habitat ==
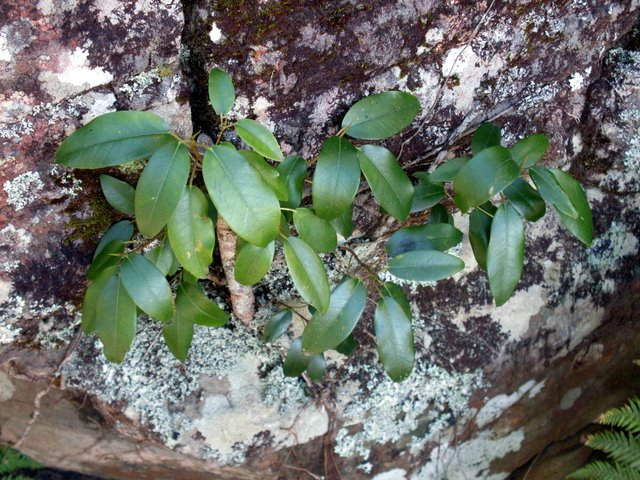
Lithophytic Ficus rubiginosa growing on Narrabeen sandstone at Barrenjoey, New South Wales

Ficus rubiginosa's range spans the entire eastern coastline of Australia, from the top of the Cape York Peninsula in north Queensland to the vicinity of Bega on the south coast of New South Wales. The range extends westwards to Porcupine Gorge National Park in Queensland and the far western plains in New South Wales. F. rubiginosa f. rubiginosa and F. rubiginosa f. glabrescens are found over most of the range, though the latter does not occur south past the New South Wales-Queensland border region. Lithophytic, hemiepiphytic, and tree forms can be found together in local populations of plants.

F. rubiginosa is found in rainforest, rainforest margins, gullies, riverbank habitat, vine thickets, and rocky hillsides. It is found on limestone outcrops in Kanangra-Boyd National Park. Fig seedlings often grow from cracks in stone where seeds have been lodged, in locations such as cliffs and rock faces in natural environments, or in brickwork on buildings and elsewhere in the urban environment. The soils it grows on are often well-drained and low in nutrients. They are derived from sandstone, quartzite, and basalt. In the Sydney region, F. rubiginosa grows from sea level to 1000 m (3500 ft) altitude, in areas with an average yearly rainfall of 600–1,400 mm (24–55 in). F. rubiginosa is largely sympatric with F. obliqua, though its range extends further west into dryer regions than the latter species.

Outside its native range, F. rubiginosa has naturalised to some degree in urban Melbourne and Adelaide in Australia, as well as New Zealand, Hawaii and California, and Mediterranean Europe. F. rubiginosa has been planted widely in Malta since the early 1990s but has not been observed to fruit.

== Ecology ==
The fruit is consumed by many bird species including the rose-crowned fruit dove (Ptilinopus regina), wompoo fruit dove (P. magnificus), wonga pigeon (Leucosarcia melanoleuca), topknot pigeon (Lopholaimus antarcticus), Pacific koel (Eudynamys orientalis), Australasian swamphen (Porphyrio melanotus), Australian king parrot (Alisterus scapularis), Australasian figbird (Sphecotheres vieilloti), green catbird (Ailuroedus crassirostris), regent bowerbird (Sericulus chrysocephalus), satin bowerbird (Ptilonorhynchus violaceus) and pied currawong (Strepera graculina), as well as the mammalian grey-headed flying fox (Pteropus poliocephalus), and spectacled flying fox (Pteropus conspicillatus). It is one of several plant species used as food by the endangered Coxen's fig parrot. Many fruits drop onto the ground around the tree, though others are dispersed by animals that eat them.

The thrips species Gynaikothrips australis feeds on the underside of new leaves of F. rubiginosa, as well as F. obliqua and F. macrophylla. As plant cells die, nearby cells are induced into forming meristem tissue, and a gall results and the leaves become distorted and curl over. The thrips begin feeding when the tree has flushes of new growth, and live for around six weeks. At other times, thrips reside on old leaves without feeding. The species pupates sheltered in the bark. The thrips remain in the galls at night, wander about in the daytime and return in the evening, possibly to different galls about the tree. Psyllids have almost defoliated trees in the Royal Botanic Gardens in Sydney in spring.

Pleistodontes imperialis crossed the waters between Australia and New Zealand some time between 1960 and 1972, and seedlings of the previously infertile trees of F. rubiginosa began appearing in brick and stone walls, and on other trees, particularly in parks and gardens around Auckland. They have been recorded as far south as Napier. P. imperialis has been transported to Hawaii, California, and Israel, where it has been observed to pollinate its host.

They can live to 100 years or more and have been known to resprout after bushfire, bearing fruit within three years.

=== Other life in the syconia ===
As with many other Ficus species, the community of wasps inside the figs of F. rubiginosa is made up mostly of pollinator wasps. These develop deep inside the syconium, presumably protected there from parasites. Also present are much smaller numbers of other wasp species, which do not pollinate the fig. At least fourteen species have been recorded, (Note: These are two species each of the genera Sycoscapter, Philotrypesis and Watshamiella of the subfamily Sycoryctinae, one species each of the genera Eukoebelea and Pseudidarnes in the subfamily Sycophaginae, one species each of the genera Herodotia and Meselatus in the subfamily Epichrysomallinae, all of the family Agaonidae, two species of the genus Sycophila of the family Eurytomidae, one species of Megastigmus of the family Torymidae and a species of the genus Ormyrus of the family Ormyridae.) of which four—two each belonging to the genera Sycoscapter and Philotrypesis—are common while others are rare. Investigation of F. rubiginosa syconia found that the fig seeds and parasitic wasps develop closer to the wall of the syconium. The wasps of the genera Sycoscapter and Philotrypesis are parasitic and are around the same size as the pollinator species. Their larvae are thought to feed on the larvae of the pollinator wasp. Male Sycoscapter and Philotrypesis wasps fight other males of the same species when they encounter each other in a F. rubiginosa fig. Several genera of uncommon larger wasp species enter the immature figs before other wasps and induce galls, which may impact on numbers of pollinator wasps in the fig later. An example of this is Pseudidarnes minerva, a metallic green wasp species.

Nematodes of the genus Schistonchus are found in the syconia (and the pollinator wasps) of many species of fig, with F. rubiginosa hosting two species. They appear to be less species-specific than wasps. S. altermacrophylla is generally associated with F. rubiginosa though it has been recorded on several other fig species.

== Cultivation ==
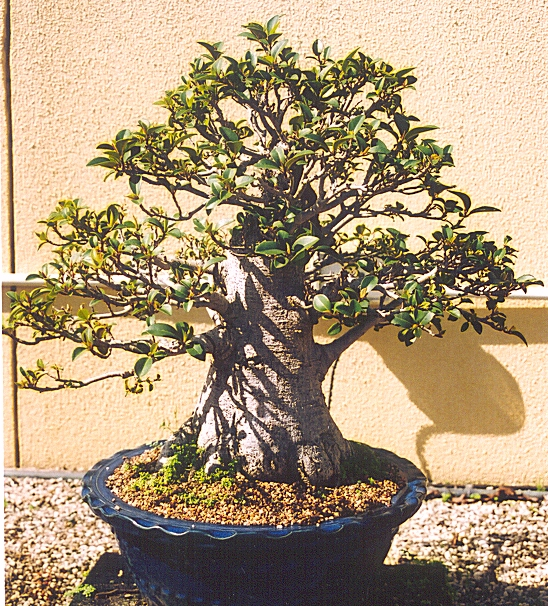
As bonsai, Auburn Botanic Gardens

Ficus rubiginosa was first cultivated in the United Kingdom in 1789, where it is grown in glasshouses. It is commonly used as a large ornamental tree in eastern Australia, in the North Island of New Zealand, and also in Hawaii and California, where it is also listed as an invasive species in some areas. It is useful as a shade tree in public parks and on golf courses. Not as prodigious as other figs, F. rubiginosa is suited to slightly more confined areas, such as lining car parks or suburban streets. However, surface roots can be large and intrusive and the thin bark readily damaged when struck. Tolerant of acid or alkaline soils, it is hardy to US Hardiness Zones 10B and 11, reaching 10 m (30 ft) high in 30 years. Planting trees 8–12 m (30–40 ft) apart will eventually result in a continuous canopy. The trees are of great value in providing fruit for birds and mammals, though drop large quantities of fruit and leaves, leaving a mess underfoot.

In a brief description, William Guilfoyle recorded a variegated fig from New South Wales "12–15 ft high" in 1911 as F. rubiginosa variety variegata. A variegated form is in cultivation on Australia's east coast, and in the United States. It is a chimera lacking in chlorophyll in the second layer of the leaf meristem. The leaves have an irregular central green patch along the midvein with irregular yellow and green elsewhere. Leaves that grow in winter generally have larger green patches than those that do in summer. The chimera is unstable, and branches of all-green growth appear sporadically.

Despite the relatively large size of the leaves, it is popular for bonsai work as it is highly forgiving to work with and hard to kill; the leaves reduce readily by leaf-pruning in early summer. Described as the best tree for a beginner to work with, it is one of the most frequently used native species in Australia. Its bark remains smooth, and does not attain a rugged, aged appearance. Known as "Little Ruby", a narrow-leaved form with its origins somewhere north of Sydney is also seen in cultivation.

F. rubiginosa is also suited for use as a houseplant in low, medium or brightly lit spaces, although a variegated form requires brighter light. It has gained the Royal Horticultural Society's Award of Garden Merit. It is easily propagated by cuttings or aerial layering.

The light-coloured wood is soft and brittle. Lightweight, it has some value in the making of such items as toys and small boxes.

== See also ==
- Ficus macrophylla
