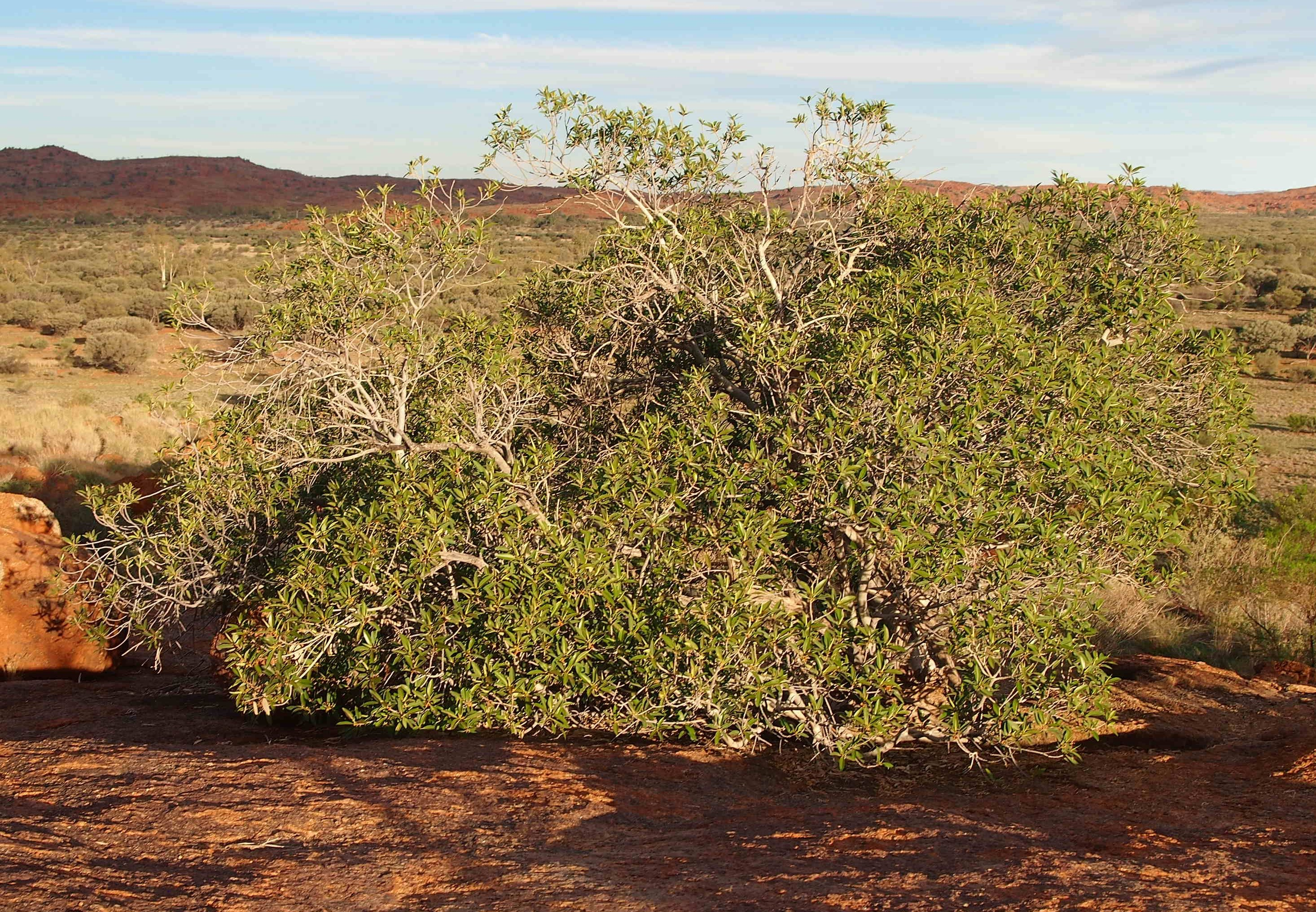

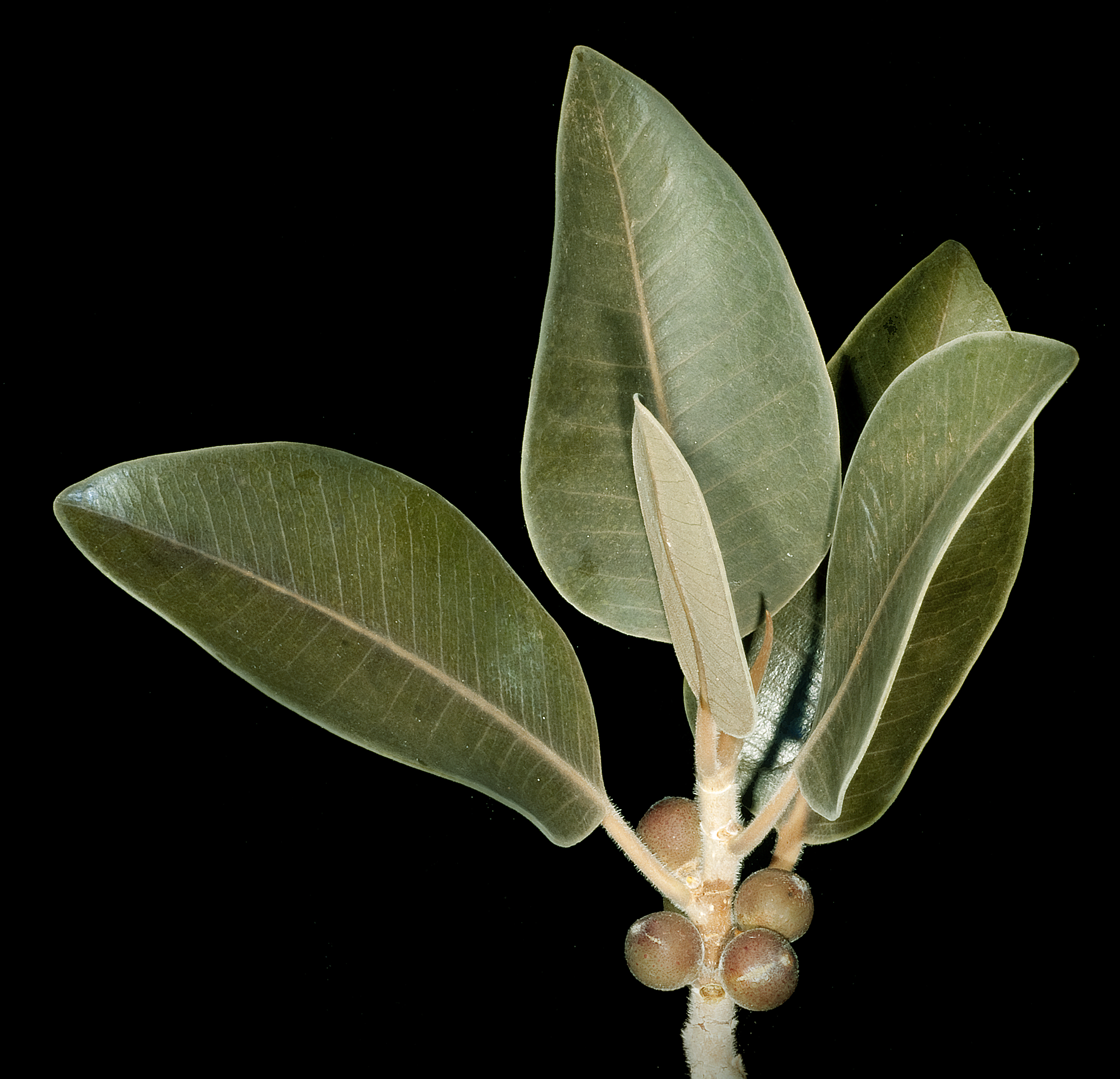

Conservation status
- Least Concern (IUCN 3.1)

Scientific classification
- Kingdom: Plantae
- Clade: Tracheophytes
- Clade: Angiosperms
- Clade: Eudicots
- Clade: Rosids
- Order: Rosales
- Family: Moraceae
- Genus: Ficus
- Species: F. platypoda

Binomial name
- Ficus platypoda (Miq.) A. Cunn. ex Miq.

Synonyms
- Ficus leucotricha (Miq.) Miq.; Ficus leucotricha var. megacarpa F.Muell. ex Corner; Ficus leucotricha var. sessilis Corner; Ficus platypoda var. typica Domin, not validly publ.; Urostigma leucotrichum Miq.; Urostigma platypodum Miq.; Urostigma platypodum f. ellipticum Miq.; Urostigma platypodum f. glabrior Miq.

= Ficus platypoda =

Species of plant in the fig family

Ficus platypoda, commonly known as the desert fig or rock fig, is a fig that is endemic to central and northern Australia. It is a lithophytic plant that grows on rocky outcrops, reaching 10 m in height.

== Taxonomy ==
Dutch botanist Friedrich Anton Wilhelm Miquel described the desert fig in 1847 as Urostigma platypodum, from material collected on both the east and west coast of Australia. The material collected by Allan Cunningham from York Sound in Western Australia became the type material. E.J.H. Corner synonymised F. platypoda with Ficus leucotricha, which was described by Miquel in 1861, however as the former name is older, it has become the accepted name instead.

Dixon examined the morphology of the Ficus leucotricha and Ficus platypoda complexes and divided them into Ficus atricha, Ficus brachypoda, Ficus cerasicarpa, and Ficus platypoda.

With over 750 species, Ficus is one of the largest angiosperm genera. Based on morphology, English botanist E. J. H. Corner divided the genus into four subgenera, which was later expanded to six. In this classification, Ficus platypoda was placed in subseries Malvanthereae, series Malvanthereae, section Malvanthera of the subgenus Urostigma. In his reclassification of the Australian Malvanthera, Australian botanist Dale J. Dixon altered the delimitations of the series within the section, but left this species in the series Malvanthereae.

In a study published in 2008, Nina Rønsted and colleagues analysed the DNA sequences from the nuclear ribosomal internal and external transcribed spacers (ITS and ETS), and the glyceraldehyde-3-phosphate dehydrogenase (G3pdh) region, in the first molecular analysis of the section Malvanthera. They found F. platypoda to be most closely related to the ancestor of two other arid Northern Territory species (F. subpuberula and F. lilliputiana) and classified it in a new series Obliquae in the subsection Platypodeae. The three species diverged from the ancestor of the transitional rainforest species F. obliqua and radiated into drier regions.

== Description ==
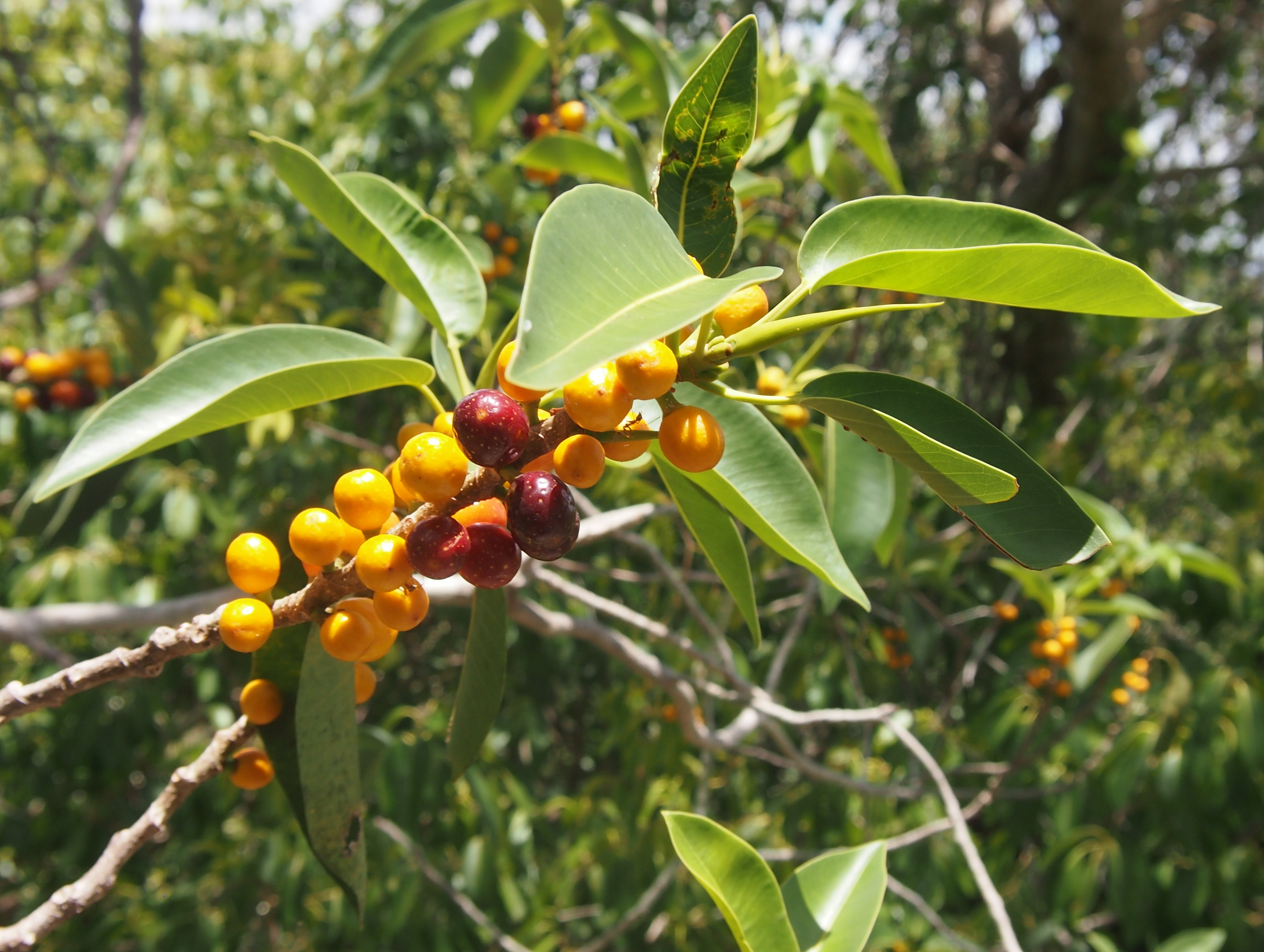
F. platypoda ripening fruit

Ficus platypoda grows as a lithophytic shrub or tree to 10 m high. The branchlets are covered in fine hairs. The leaves are alternately arranged along the stems and are elliptical to oval in shape, measuring 5.3–16.7 cm (2.1–6.6 in) long by 3.1–13.3 cm (1.2–5.2 in) wide. The undersurface is furry. The oval to round figs pale can be various shades of yellow, orange, pink, red or purple and 0.9–2.8 cm (0.4–1.1 in) long by 1–2.8 cm (0.4–1.1 in) across.

== Distribution and habitat ==
Within Australia, it is found across the Top End, from the Gulf Country around the Gulf of Carpentaria across the Northern Territory and into northern Western Australia. It generally found on sandstone outcrops, but has occasionally been found on limestone outcrops.

== Ecology ==
The wasp species Pleistodontes cuneatus pollinates the rock fig.

== Uses ==
The fruit can be eaten when soft and ripe. Horticulturally, it is suitable for use in bonsai; its tendency to form a wide trunk base and small leaves being attractive features. Specimens have been exhibited in at the 5th Annual Exhibition of Australian Native Plants as Bonsai in Canberra in November 2007.
