= Pleistodontes achorus =

Scientific classification
- Domain: Eukaryota
- Kingdom: Animalia
- Phylum: Arthropoda
- Class: Insecta
- Order: Hymenoptera
- Family: Agaonidae
- Subfamily: Agaoninae
- Genus: Pleistodontes
- Species: P. achorus

Binomial name
- Pleistodontes achorus Lopez-Vaamonde, Dixon & Cook, 2002

Species of wasp

Pleistodontes achorus is a species of fig wasp which is native to Australia. The host fig is unknown, but based on the size of the wasp and the site where it was collected, Carlos Lopez-Vaamonde and coauthors suggested that the host is likely to be Ficus crassipes, F. watkinsiana, F. triradiata or F. pleurocarpa.
