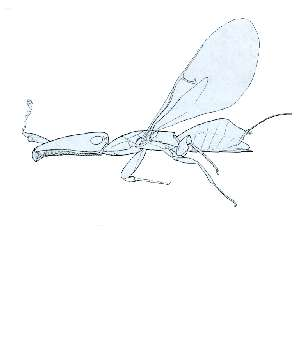
- Pleistodontes froggatti

Scientific classification
- Kingdom: Animalia
- Phylum: Arthropoda
- Clade: Pancrustacea
- Class: Insecta
- Order: Hymenoptera
- Family: Agaonidae
- Subfamily: Agaoninae
- Genus: Pleistodontes
- Species: P. froggatti

Binomial name
- Pleistodontes froggatti Mayr, 1906

Synonyms
- Pleistodontes semirucifeps Girault; Pleistodontes listzi Girault; Pleistodontes mayri Girault

= Pleistodontes froggatti =

Species of wasp

Pleistodontes froggatti is a species of fig wasp that is native to Australia. It has an obligate mutualism with the Moreton Bay fig, Ficus macrophylla, the species it pollinates. Outside Australia, populations have become established in Hawaii (where it was deliberately introduced) and New Zealand, where it was either accidentally introduced or arrived by long-distance dispersal.

== Description ==
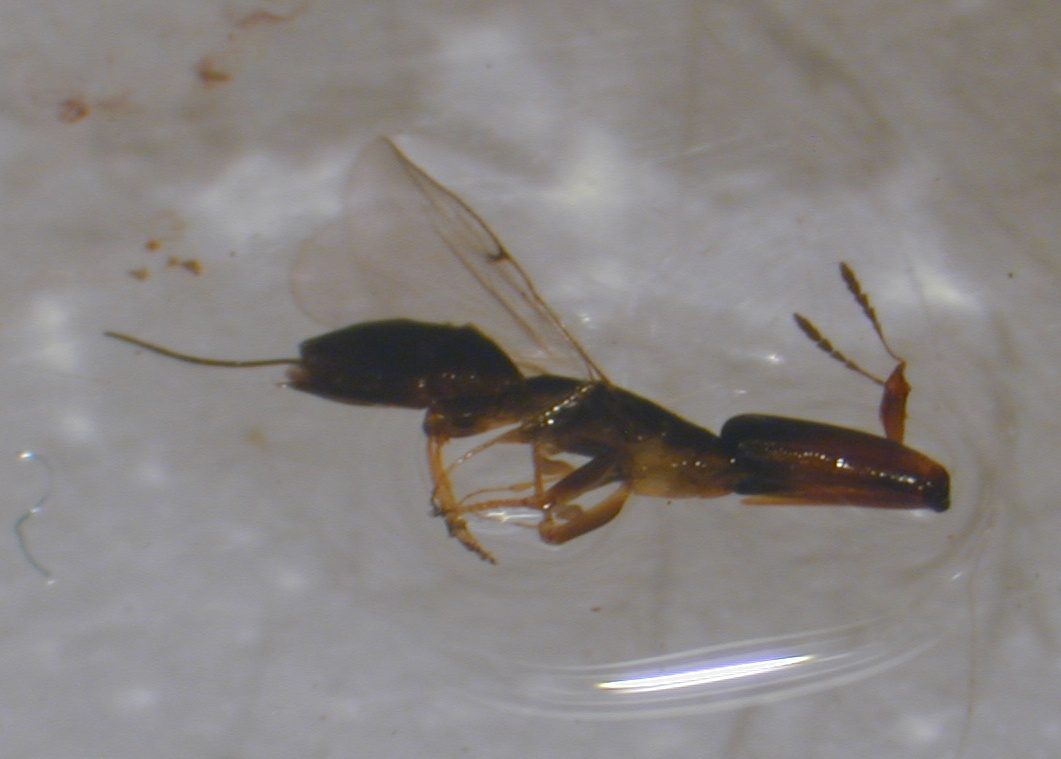
Pleistodontes froggatti from Hawaii

Pleistodontes froggatti is a small wasp. Females are 3.0–3.4 mm (0.12–0.13 in) long with black, brown and reddish brown bodies. Males are 1.5 mm (0.059 in) in length, with yellow and orange bodies.

== Taxonomy ==
The specific epithet, froggatti, is in honour of Australian entomologist W. W. Froggatt. The first account of the species' biology was written by Froggatt in 1901, who imperfectly identified it as Pleistodontes imperialis. Austrian entomologist Gustav Mayr re-described the species in 1906 and named it in honour of Froggatt.

== Reproduction ==
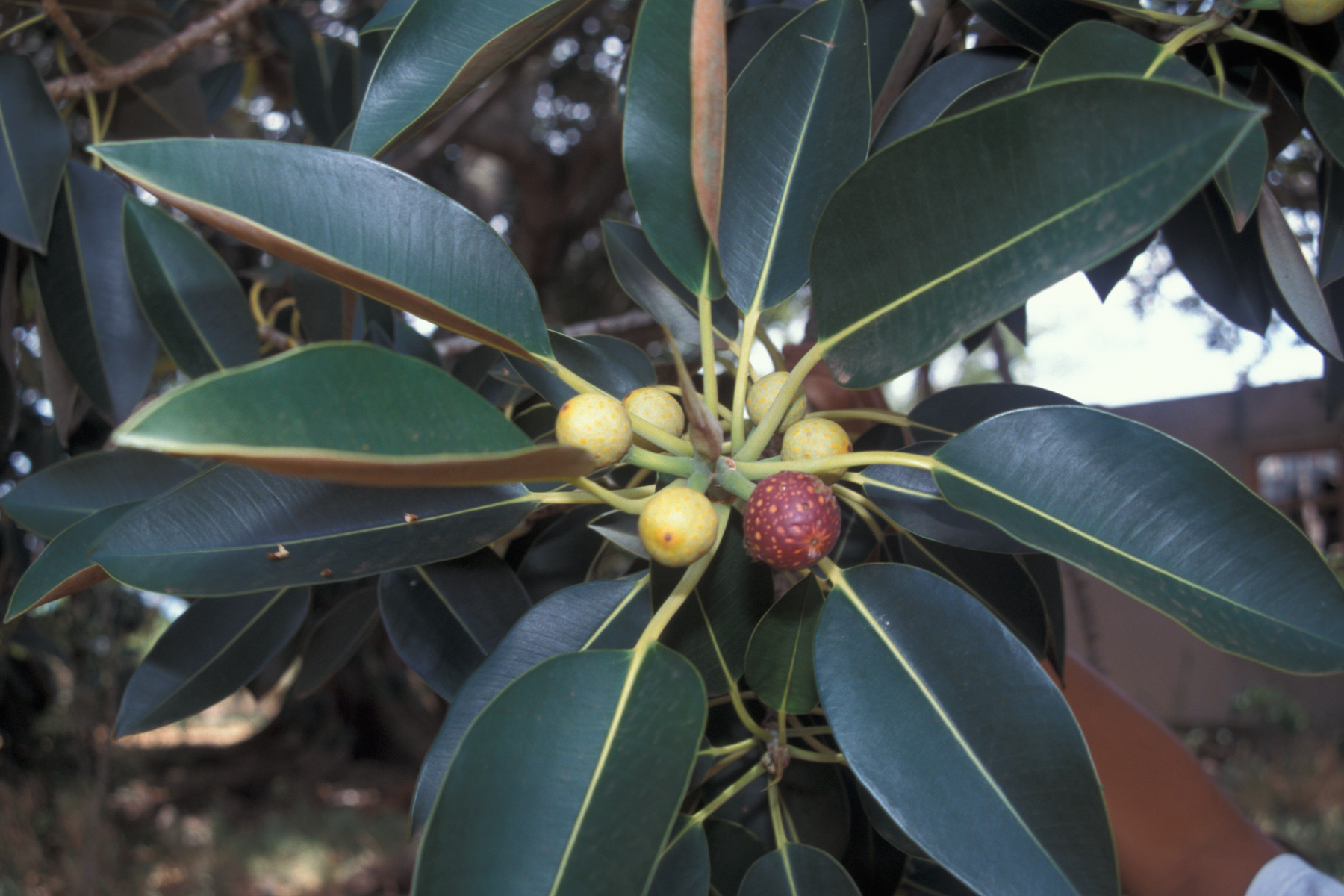
Ficus macrophylla figs in Hawaii. Pleistodontes froggatti only reproduces in figs of its host tree.

Figs have an obligate mutualism with fig wasps, (Agaonidae); figs are only pollinated by fig wasps, and fig wasps can only reproduce in fig flowers. Pleistodontes froggatti can only reproduce in the syconia of its host species, the Moreton Bay fig, Ficus macrophylla.

== Distribution ==
Ficus macrophylla is native to southeast Queensland, eastern New South Wales and Lord Howe Island, and has been planted widely across the world. Pleistodontes froggatti has been found across most of the range of its host tree in Australia. It also occurs in New Zealand and Hawaii.

The Maui Pineapple Company introduced F. macrophylla to its lands in the 1920s. P. froggatti was introduced to Hawaii in 1921 and has been recorded from the islands of Hawaiʻi, Lānaʻi, Kauaʻi, Oʻahu and Molokaʻi. It is also presumed present on Maui, given that F. macrophylla is naturalised on the island. It has also been collected in the Midway Atoll.

Pleistodontes froggatti was first recorded in New Zealand in 1993, a 3,000 km (1,900 mi) journey from its nearest range in Australia. Adult female wasps usually live 2–3 days; there are, on average, 21 days over the course of a year during which it would be possible for make the trip in 1–3 days on air currents. In addition, a female wasp could hitch a ride on an aircraft. After establishing in New Zealand, P. froggatti spread rapidly, making use of widely planted populations of Moreton Bay figs. The arrival of the wasp led to prolific production of fruits containing many small seeds adapted for dispersal by birds.
