= Pleistodontes athysanus =

Scientific classification
- Domain: Eukaryota
- Kingdom: Animalia
- Phylum: Arthropoda
- Class: Insecta
- Order: Hymenoptera
- Family: Agaonidae
- Subfamily: Agaoninae
- Genus: Pleistodontes
- Species: P. athysanus

Binomial name
- Pleistodontes athysanus Lopez-Vaamonde, Dixon & Cook, 2002

Synonyms
- Pleistodontes proximus Wiebes

Species of wasp

Pleistodontes athysanus is a species of fig wasp which is native to Australia. It has generally been collected from the syconia of Ficus brachypoda, but two individuals have been collected from F. cerasicarpa.
