= Pleistodontes nitens =

Scientific classification
- Domain: Eukaryota
- Kingdom: Animalia
- Phylum: Arthropoda
- Class: Insecta
- Order: Hymenoptera
- Family: Agaonidae
- Subfamily: Agaoninae
- Genus: Pleistodontes
- Species: P. nitens

Binomial name
- Pleistodontes nitens (Girault, 1915)

Synonyms
- Neoceratosolens nitens Girault, 1915

Species of wasp

Pleistodontes nitens is a species of fig wasp which is native to Australia. It has an obligate mutualism with Ficus crassipes, the fig species it pollinates.
