= Pleistodontes schizodontus =

Scientific classification
- Domain: Eukaryota
- Kingdom: Animalia
- Phylum: Arthropoda
- Class: Insecta
- Order: Hymenoptera
- Family: Agaonidae
- Subfamily: Agaoninae
- Genus: Pleistodontes
- Species: P. schizodontus

Binomial name
- Pleistodontes schizodontus Lopez-Vaamonde, Dixon & Cook, 2002

Species of wasp

Pleistodontes schizodontus is a species of fig wasp which is native to Australia. It has an obligate mutualism with Ficus triradiata, the fig species it pollinates.
