= Pleistodontes greenwoodi =

Scientific classification
- Domain: Eukaryota
- Kingdom: Animalia
- Phylum: Arthropoda
- Class: Insecta
- Order: Hymenoptera
- Family: Agaonidae
- Subfamily: Agaoninae
- Genus: Pleistodontes
- Species: P. greenwoodi

Binomial name
- Pleistodontes greenwoodi Grandi, 1928

Synonyms
- Blastophaga greenwoodi Grandi; Proceratosolens medionigra Girault; Pleistodontes medioniger Girault

Species of wasp

Pleistodontes greenwoodi is a species of fig wasp which is native to Australia. It has an obligate mutualism with Ficus obliqua, the fig species it pollinates.
