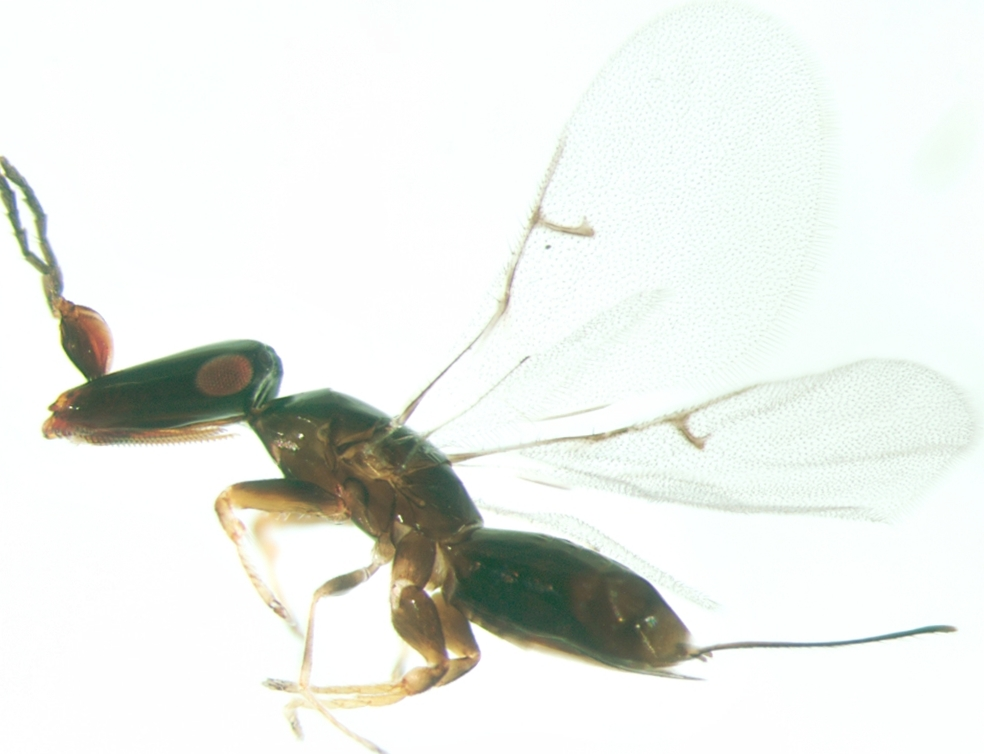
- Pleistodontes sp. female

Scientific classification
- Kingdom: Animalia
- Phylum: Arthropoda
- Clade: Pancrustacea
- Class: Insecta
- Order: Hymenoptera
- Family: Agaonidae
- Subfamily: Agaoninae
- Genus: Pleistodontes; Saunders 1882

Type species
- Pleistodontes imperialis Saunders, 1882

= Pleistodontes =

Genus of wasps

Pleistodontes is a genus of fig wasps native to Australia and New Guinea, with one species (P. claviger) from Java. Fig wasps have an obligate mutualism with the fig species they pollinate. Pleistodontes pollinates species in section Malvanthera of the Ficus subgenus Urostigma.

In their revision of the Australian members of the genus, Carlos Lopez-Vaamonde and coauthors expressed the opinion that P. claviger did not belong in the genus.

== Species ==
The Natural History Museum lists:

- Pleistodontes addicotti Wiebes
- Pleistodontes achorus Lopez-Vaamonde, Dixon & Cook
- Pleistodontes astrabocheilus Lopez-Vaamonde, Dixon & Cook
- Pleistodontes athysanus Lopez-Vaamonde, Dixon & Cook
- Pleistodontes blandus Wiebes
- Pleistodontes claviger (Mayr)
- Pleistodontes cuneatus Wiebes
- Pleistodontes deuterus Lopez-Vaamonde, Dixon & Cook
- Pleistodontes froggatti Mayr
- Pleistodontes galbinus Wiebes
- Pleistodontes greenwoodi (Grandi)
- Pleistodontes immaturus Wiebes
- Pleistodontes imperialis Saunders
- Pleistodontes longicaudus Wiebes
- Pleistodontes macrocainus Lopez-Vaamonde, Dixon & Cook
- Pleistodontes mandibularis Wiebes
- Pleistodontes nigriventris (Girault)
- Pleistodontes nitens (Girault)
- Pleistodontes plebejus Wiebes
- Pleistodontes proximus Wiebes
- Pleistodontes regalis Grandi
- Pleistodontes rennellensis Wiebes
- Pleistodontes rieki Wiebes
- Pleistodontes rigisamos Wiebes
- Pleistodontes schizodontus Lopez-Vaamonde, Dixon & Cook
- Pleistodontes xanthocephalus Lopez-Vaamonde, Dixon & Cook
