= Pleistodontes macrocainus =

Scientific classification
- Domain: Eukaryota
- Kingdom: Animalia
- Phylum: Arthropoda
- Class: Insecta
- Order: Hymenoptera
- Family: Agaonidae
- Subfamily: Agaoninae
- Genus: Pleistodontes
- Species: P. macrocainus

Binomial name
- Pleistodontes macrocainus Lopez-Vaamonde, Dixon, Cook & Rasplus 2002

Species of wasp

Pleistodontes macrocainus is a species of fig wasp which is native to Australia. It is associated with Ficus cerasicarpa and F. brachypoda.

== Description ==
Female P. macrocainus wasps are 1.6 to 1.9 millimetres (0.063 to 0.075 in) long, while males are 0.9 to 1.1 mm (0.035 to 0.043 in) long.

== Taxonomy ==
Pleistodontes macrocainus was described by Carlos Lopez-Vaamonde, Dale Dixon, James M. Cook and Jean-Yves Rasplus in 2002 based on specimens collected from Ficus cerasicarpa. Since they could not discern any consistent differences between the wasps collected from F. cerasicarpa and F. brachypoda, they concluded that both figs are pollinated by the same species of fig wasp.
