= Pleistodontes nigriventris =

Scientific classification
- Domain: Eukaryota
- Kingdom: Animalia
- Phylum: Arthropoda
- Class: Insecta
- Order: Hymenoptera
- Family: Agaonidae
- Subfamily: Agaoninae
- Genus: Pleistodontes
- Species: P. nigriventris

Binomial name
- Pleistodontes nigriventris (Girault, 1915)

Synonyms
- Agaon nigriventre Girault

Species of wasp

Pleistodontes nigriventris is a species of fig wasp which is native to Australia. It has an obligate mutualism with Ficus watkinsiana, the fig species it pollinates.
