= Pleistodontes cuneatus =

Scientific classification
- Domain: Eukaryota
- Kingdom: Animalia
- Phylum: Arthropoda
- Class: Insecta
- Order: Hymenoptera
- Family: Agaonidae
- Subfamily: Agaoninae
- Genus: Pleistodontes
- Species: P. cuneatus

Binomial name
- Pleistodontes cuneatus Wiebes, 1990

Species of wasp

Pleistodontes cuneatus is a species of fig wasp which is native to Australia. It has an obligate mutualism with Ficus platypoda, the fig species it pollinates.
