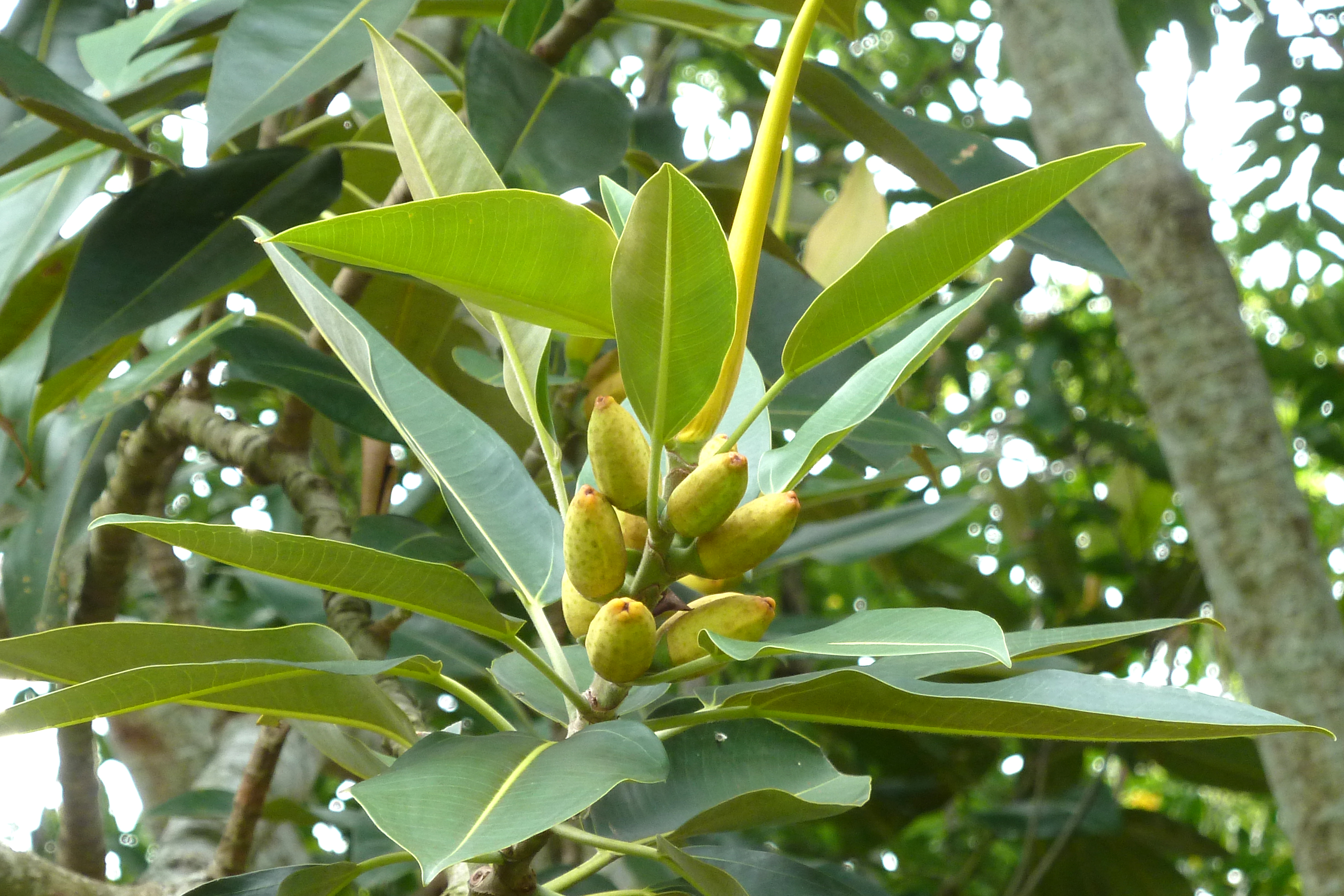

Conservation status
- Least Concern (IUCN 3.1)

Scientific classification
- Kingdom: Plantae
- Clade: Tracheophytes
- Clade: Angiosperms
- Clade: Eudicots
- Clade: Rosids
- Order: Rosales
- Family: Moraceae
- Genus: Ficus
- Species: F. pleurocarpa

Binomial name
- Ficus pleurocarpa F.Muell.

Synonyms
- Ficus cylindrica Warb.

= Ficus pleurocarpa =

Species of epiphyte

Ficus pleurocarpa, commonly known as the banana fig, karpe fig or gabi fig, is a fig that is endemic to the wet tropical rainforests of northeastern Queensland, Australia. It has characteristic ribbed orange and red cylindrical syconia. It begins life as a hemiepiphyte, later becoming a tree up to 25 m (82 ft) tall. F. pleurocarpa is one of the few figs known to be pollinated by more than one species of fig wasp.

== Taxonomy ==
Ficus pleurocarpa was described by German-Australian botanist Ferdinand von Mueller in 1874 in Fragmenta Phytographiae Australiae. Its specific epithet is derived from Ancient Greek pleuro-, ribbed, and -carpus, fruit, or flesh of the fruit, hence "ribbed fruit". This is derived from the 5–10 ribs that run along the length of the fruit.

With over 750 species, Ficus is one of the largest angiosperm genera. On the basis of morphology, English botanist E. J. H. Corner divided the genus into four subgenera which were later expanded to six. In this classification, F. pleurocarpa was placed in subseries Hesperidiiformes, series Malvanthereae, section Malvanthera of the subgenus Urostigma. In his reclassification of the Australian Malvanthera, Dixon altered the delimitations of the series within the section, but left this species in series Hesperidiiformes.

In 2005, Cornelis Berg completed Corner's treatment of the Moraceae for the Flora Malesiana; the completion of that work had been delayed since 1972 as a result of disagreements between Corner and C. J. J. G. van Steenis, editor of the Flora Malesiana. Berg combined sections Stilpnophyllum and Malvanthera into an expanded section Stilpnophyllum. This left F. pleurocarpa in subsection Malvanthera, section Stilpnophyllum.

Based on DNA sequences from the nuclear ribosomal internal and external transcribed spacers, Nina Rønsted and colleagues rejected previous subdivisions of the Malvanthera. Instead, they divided section Malvanthera into three subsections—Malvantherae, Platypodeae and Hesperidiiformes. In this system, F. pleurocarpa is in the new subsection Malvantherae.

== Description ==
Ficus pleurocarpa is a monoecious tree which grows up to 25 m (82 ft) tall. Its leaves are 150–257 mm (5.9–10.1 in) long and 49–100 mm (1.9–3.9 in) wide. Its syconia are orange or red in colour, 39–61 mm (1.5–2.4 in) long and 19–27 mm (0.75–1.06 in) in diameter. It begins life as a hemiepiphyte.

== Reproduction ==
Figs have an obligate mutualism with fig wasps, (Agaonidae); figs are pollinated only by fig wasps, and fig wasps can reproduce only in fig flowers. Generally, each fig species depends on a single species of wasp for pollination. The wasps are similarly dependent on their fig species to reproduce. F. pleurocarpa is pollinated by two species of fig wasp—Pleistodontes regalis and P. deuterus. This is one of the few cases where more than one species of fig wasp has been raised from the same syconium. The assumption that fig species are usually pollinated by just one species of fig wasp has been challenged by the discovery of cryptic species complexes among what was thought previously to be single species of fig wasps.

== Distribution ==
Ficus pleurocarpa is an Australian endemic. It is found in north-east Queensland, from Cape Tribulation south to the Atherton Tableland. It grows in lowland and upland wet tropical rainforests from sea level up to 1,000 m (3,300 ft) above sea level.

== Ecology ==
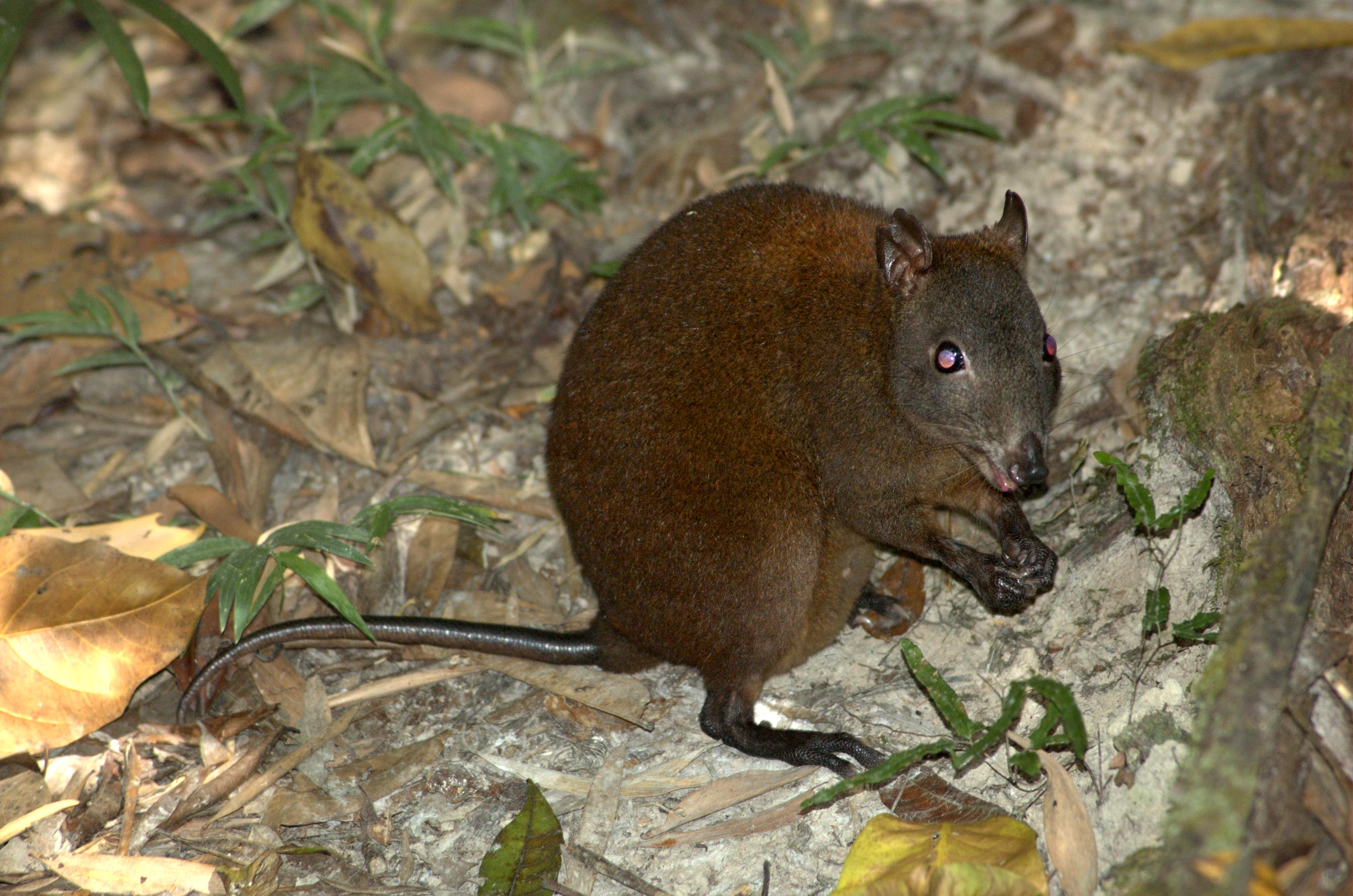
During a season of fruit scarcity, Ficus pleurocarpa sustained the musky rat-kangaroo population at one particular research site.

Figs are sometimes considered to be potential keystone species in communities of fruit-eating animals; their asynchronous fruiting patterns may cause them to be important fruit sources when other food sources are scarce. Ficus pleurocarpa was the most largest contributor of fruit biomass in the forest canopy during periods of fruit scarcity, and was ranked as the species that made the second most important contribution to the frugivore community, although the authors of the study were unwilling to call it a keystone species. However, during a season of fruit scarcity, F. pleurocarpa sustained the musky rat-kangaroo population at one particular research site

The fruit of F. pleurocarpa fruit are relatively small and become soft when ripe. This makes them accessible to the entire fruit-eating community. However, most F. pleurocarpa figs are available in the canopy—only a small proportion of the fruit crop falls to the forest floor.

Spectacled flying-foxes consume F. pleurocarpa fruit and act as seed dispersers.

In a study of fungal succession, 104 species were observed over the course of a three-month incubation of F. pleurocarpa leaves. Using different methods, 53 fruiting species and 100 sterile morphospecies were isolated. Cylindrocladium australiense, a new species of fungus in the family Nectriaceae described in 2006, was isolated from F. pleurocarpa leaves.

== Uses ==
The figs are edible fresh or dried and are described as "tasty at the fully ripe red stage".
