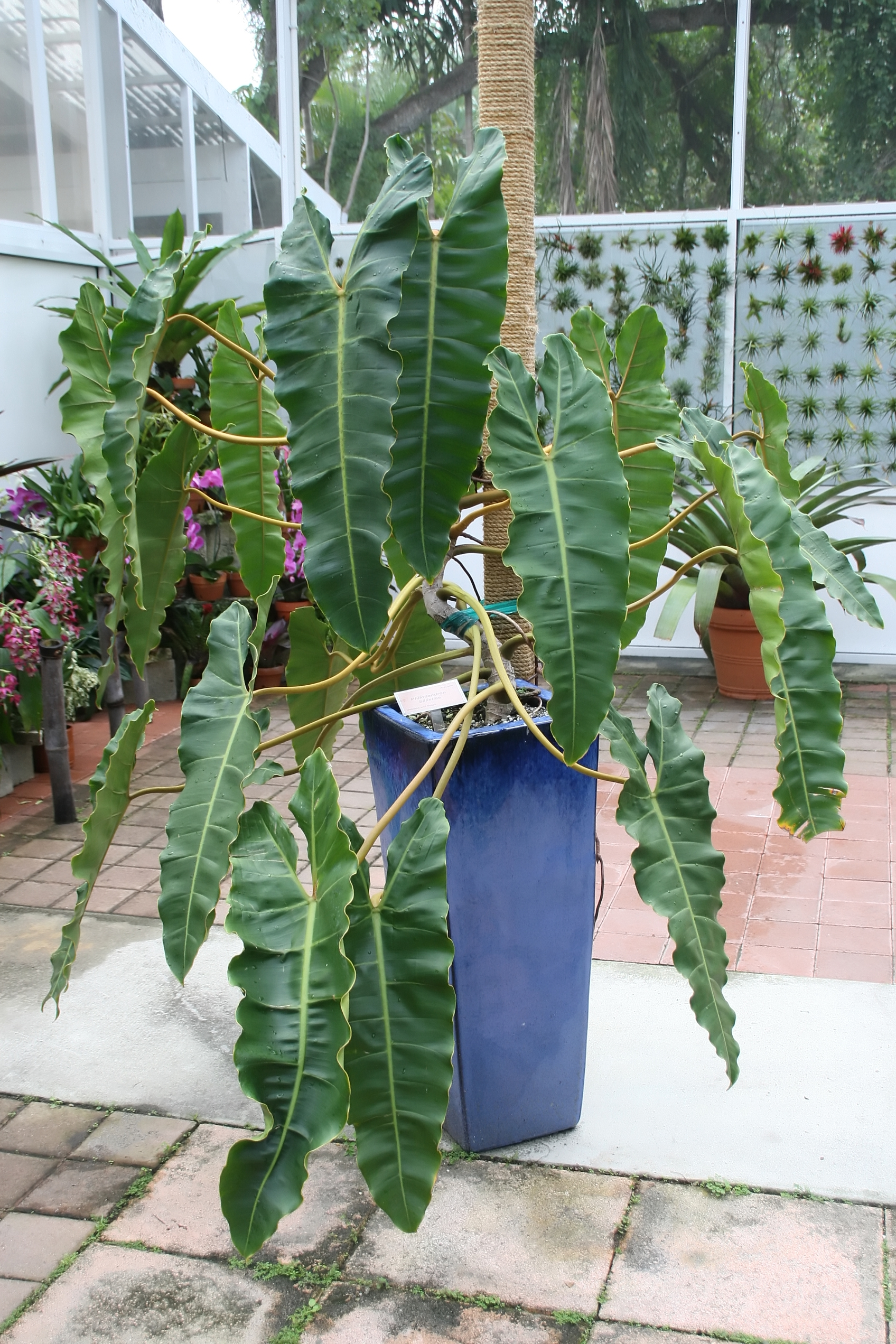
- Philodendron billietiae at Fairchild Tropical Botanic Garden

Scientific classification
- Kingdom: Plantae
- Clade: Tracheophytes
- Clade: Angiosperms
- Clade: Monocots
- Order: Alismatales
- Family: Araceae
- Genus: Philodendron
- Species: P. billietiae

Binomial name
- Philodendron billietiae Croat

= Philodendron billietiae =

Species of philodendron

Philodendron billietiae is a hemi-epiphytic species of plant in the genus Philodendron native to Brazil, Guyana, and French Guiana. A relatively recent discovery in 1995, P. billietiae is known especially for its distinctive orange-yellow petioles and wavy, ridged leaf edges.

== History ==
Philodendron billietiae was first discovered by Frieda Billiet in 1981 in lowland tropical rain-forest in French Guiana. Living material from the plant was collected and introduced to cultivation in the greenhouses of the National Botanic Garden of Belgium at Meise.

== See also ==
- List of Philodendron species
