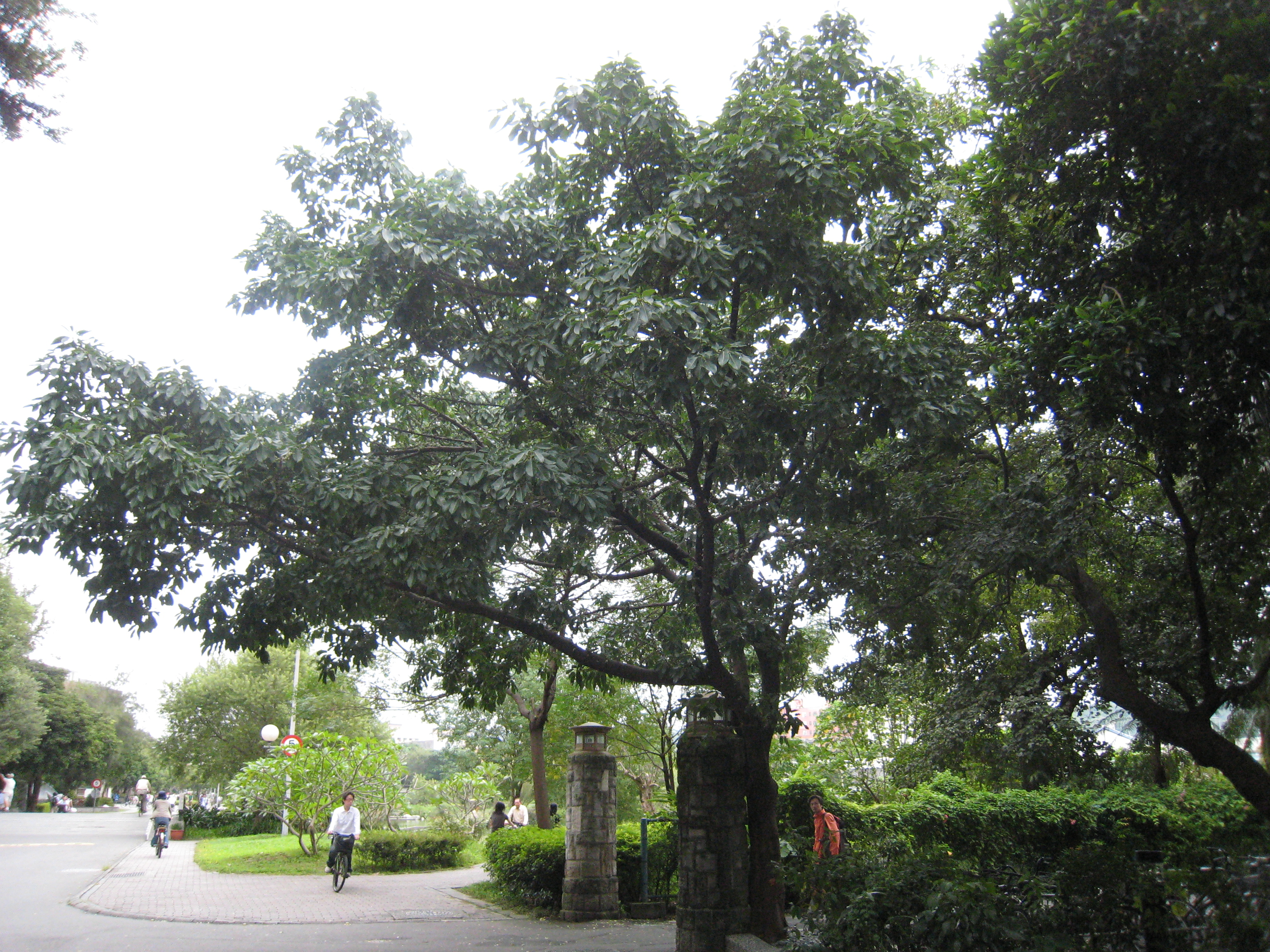
- Ficus subpisocarpa in Taiwan
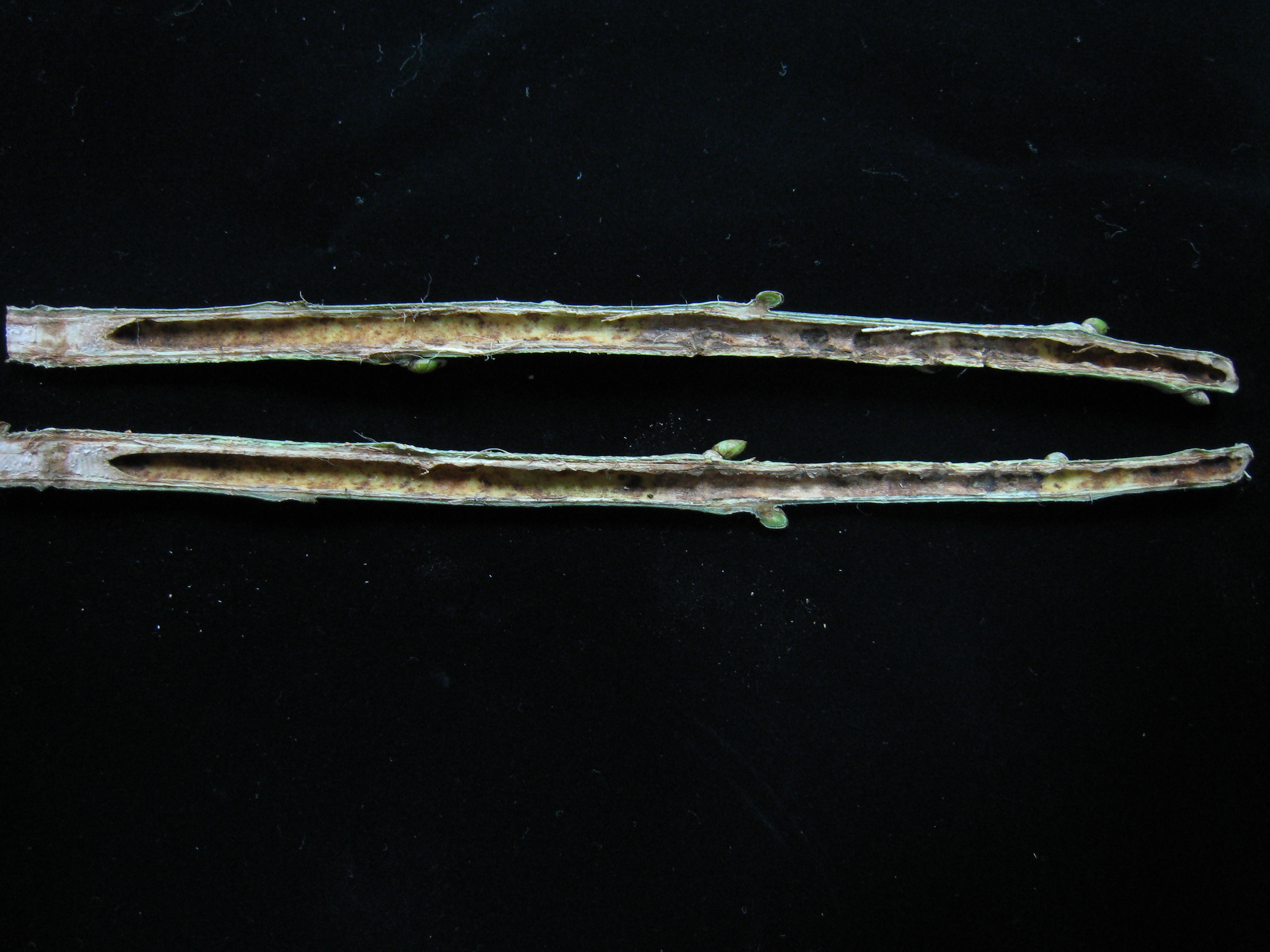
- Ant nest within Ficus subpisocarpa branch

Conservation status
- Least Concern (IUCN 3.1)

Scientific classification
- Kingdom: Plantae
- Clade: Tracheophytes
- Clade: Angiosperms
- Clade: Eudicots
- Clade: Rosids
- Order: Rosales
- Family: Moraceae
- Genus: Ficus
- Subgenus: F. subg. Urostigma
- Species: F. subpisocarpa

Binomial name
- Ficus subpisocarpa Gagnep.

Subspecies
- Ficus subpisocarpa subsp. pubipoda C.C.Berg; Ficus subpisocarpa subsp. subpisocarpa

Synonyms
- synonyms of subsp. subpisocarpa: Ficus superba var. japonica

= Ficus subpisocarpa =

Species of fig

Ficus subpisocarpa, commonly known as Japanese superb fig, superb fig or pen tube fig, is a species of fig native to Japan, China, Hong Kong, Taiwan and southeast Asia to the Moluccas (Ceram). Terrestrial or hemiepiphytic, it reaches a height of 12 m (39 ft). Ants, predominantly of the genus Crematogaster, have been recorded living in stem cavities.

== Taxonomy ==
Ficus subpisocarpa was described by the French botanist François Gagnepain in 1927, from a collection near Haiphong in Vietnam. It was reduced to a synonym of F. superba variety japonica by E. J. H. Corner in 1965, before being raised to species status again by Cornelis Christiaan Berg in 2005. Within the genus, Ficus subpisocarpa belongs in the banyan subgenus Urostigma section Urostigma subsection Urostigma. Two subspecies are recognised:

- Ficus subpisocarpa subsp. subpisocarpa – petiole glabrous.
- Ficus subpisocarpa subsp. pubipoda C.C.Berg – distinguished by having the base of the petiole puberulent, with short white hairs.

== Description ==
Ficus subpisocarpa is a tree that grows up to 12 metres (39 feet) high, growing from the ground or directly on other trees as a hemiepiphyte. The bark is dark brown, while the branches are reddish brown to dark grey. The foliage is deciduous in at least some areas, but possibly not in other areas, and trees may only be leafless for a week before new leaves grow. The leaves and petioles are glabrous (hairless), and the leaves are symmetrical, elliptical and oblong with a rounded base, and can measure anywhere from 4 to 24 cm (1.5 to 9.5 in) long by 1.5–13 cm (0.59–5.12 in) wide. They are spirally arranged on the stem. The growth of new tissue occurs when a whole section of the branch undergoes budding and becomes covered with leaves. The figs are ramiflorous, that is they grow on the branches, in groups of one to three. There is a high variation in colour between trees and seasons; mature figs are whitish pink to dark purple, often patterned with pale spots, are bulbous to globose, and measure 0.5 to 0.8 cm (0.20 to 0.31 in) in diameter. Maturation is also highly variable, even on a single tree; it is synchronous up until the pollinating fig wasps emerge, but variable after that, with some figs maturing rapidly but others only fully ripe five weeks after wasp emergence. Two to four crops of figs can be produced in a year. Ficus subpisocarpa is pollinated by fig wasps in the genus Platyscapa (Agaonidae), specifically P. ishiiana.

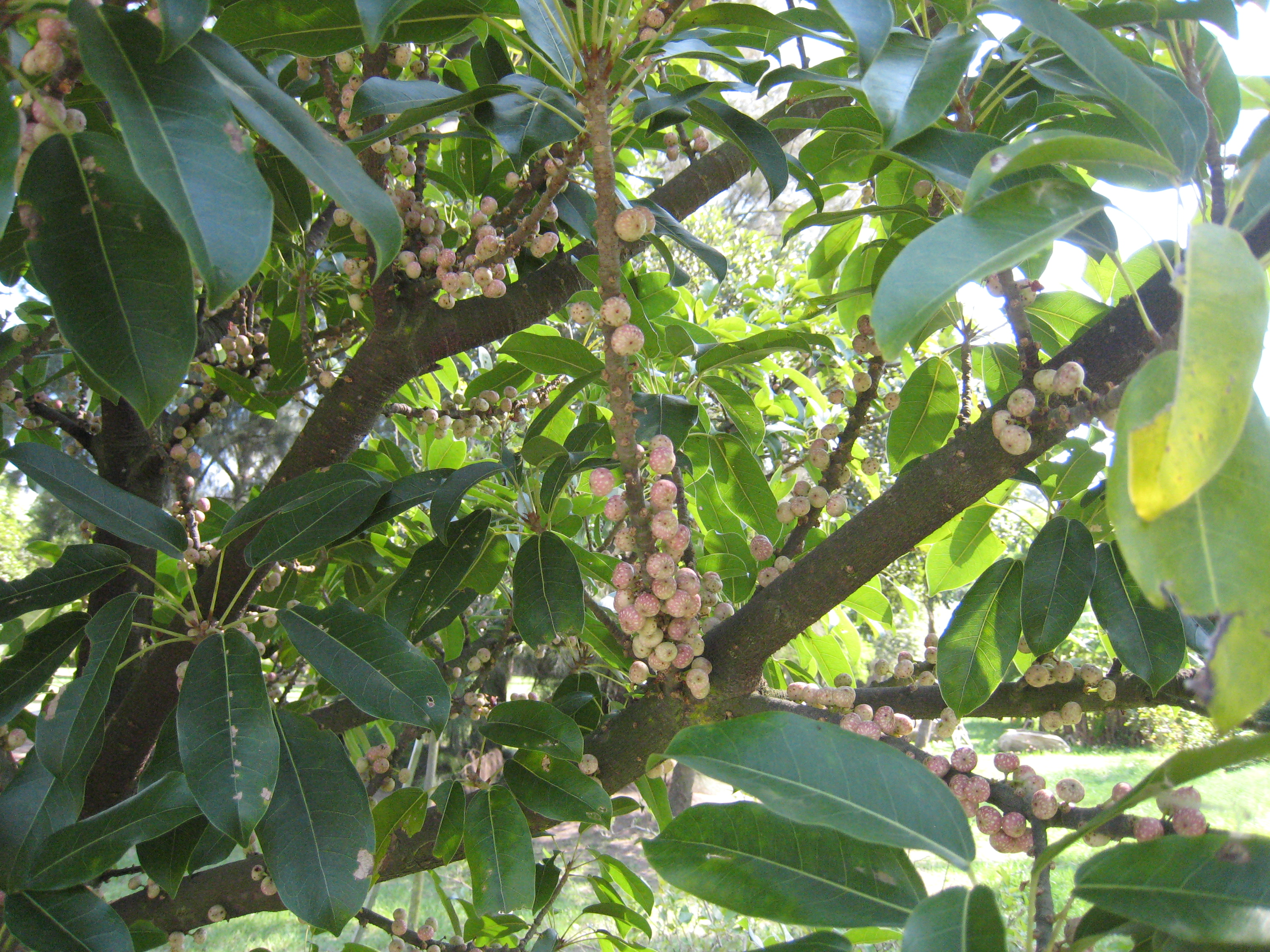
Ficus subpisocarpa branches in Kinmen

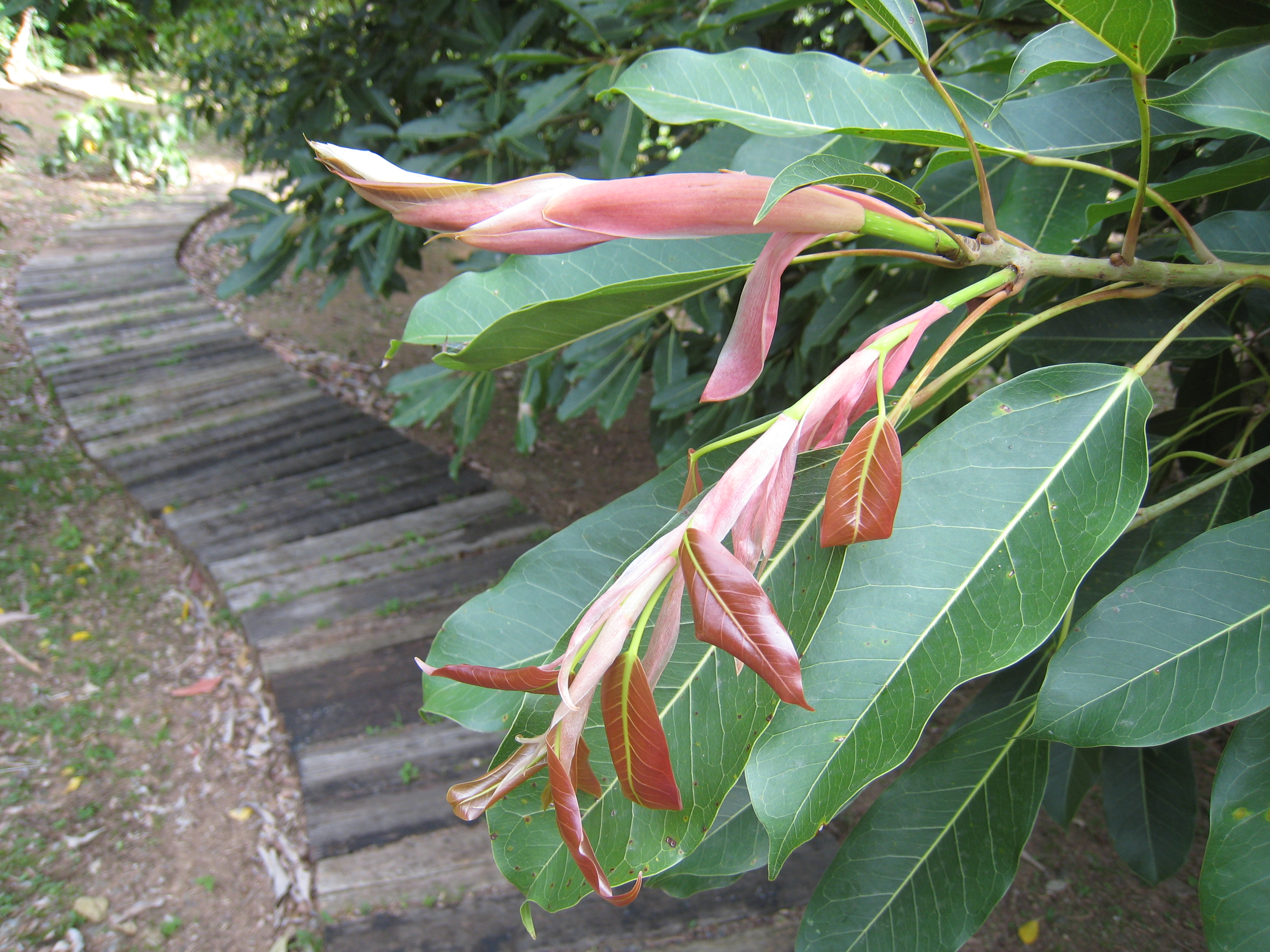
Ficus subpisocarpa budding in Kenting, Taiwan, with apparently evergreen foliage

== Distribution and habitat ==
The nominate subspecies is found from Southern Japan, Taiwan, Hainan and eastern China (where it occurs in Fujian, Guangdong, Guangxi, southern Yunnan and southeastern Zhejiang provinces), through Vietnam, Laos and Thailand into Indonesia where it reaches Ceram in the Moluccas. It is possibly found in Cambodia. Subspecies pubipoda is found in Vietnam, Cambodia, Thailand and Peninsular Malaysia.

Both subspecies are found in deciduous and evergreen forests, the nominate at low elevations and subspecies pubipoda to 1,400 m (4,600 ft).

== Ecology ==
In a field study in Taiwan, ants were found to inhabit cavities within internodes of young branches of Ficus subpisocarpa. They feed on wasps, more commonly on non-pollinating rather than the pollinating species necessary for the fig to reproduce. It is possible that the fig developed the cavities to accommodate the ants. 75% of ants recorded in the study belonged to the genus Crematogaster, with the remainder belonging to the genera Technomyrmex, Myrmica and Prenolepis. Sometimes two ant species shared the cavities. The cavities mostly ranged between 2 and 14 cm (1 and 5.5 in) in length. The ants appear to tend aphids and scale insects that are present on the fig plant. Ficus subpisocarpa is the second Ficus species observed with ants inhabiting branch cavities, the first observation was done in Borneo on Ficus obscura var. borneensis.

== Uses ==
The rigidity of its bark makes it suitable for carving and sculpture. The species also develops a broad crown that provides ample shade, and it is therefore widely planted along streets and in parks.
