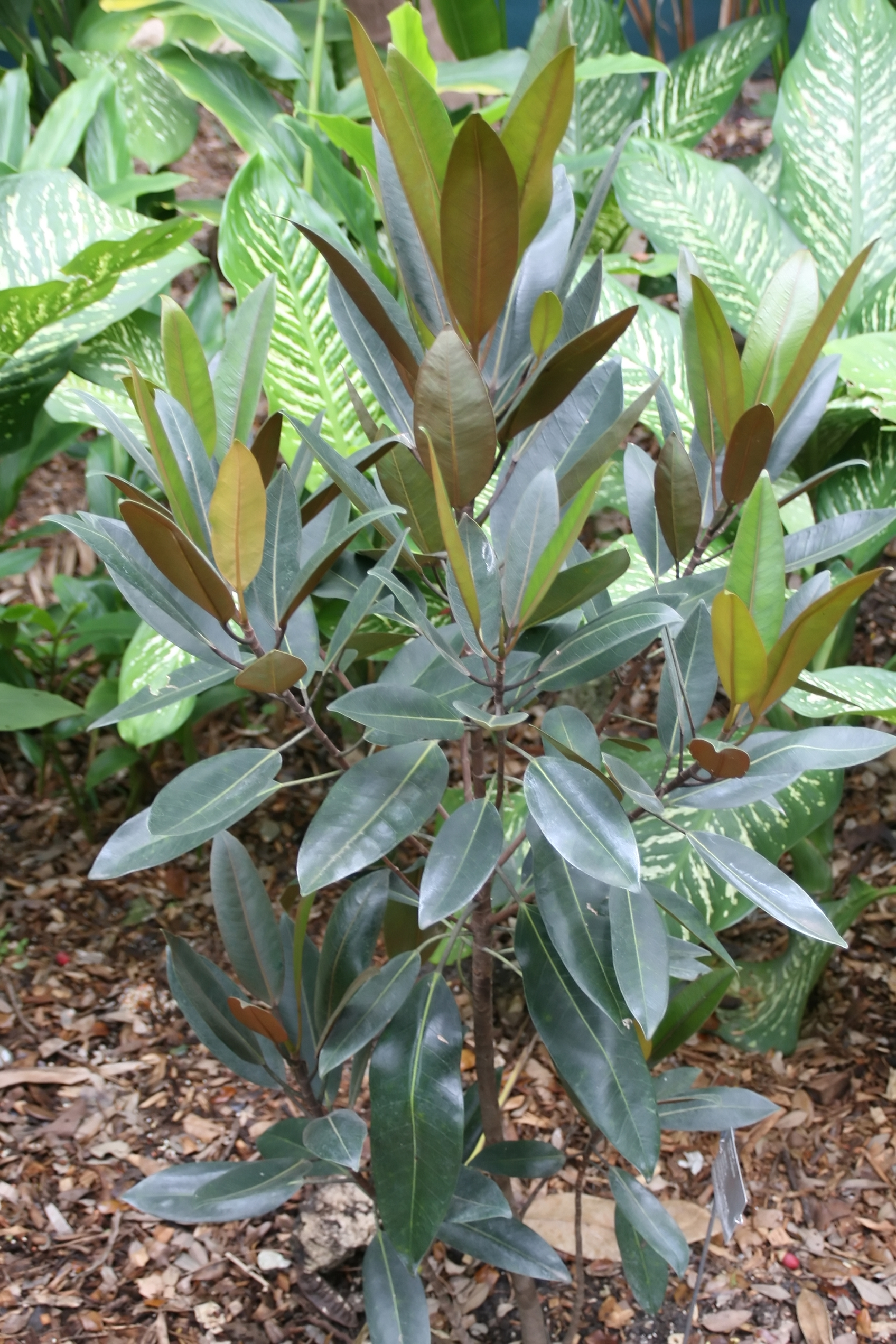

Conservation status
- Least Concern (IUCN 3.1)

Scientific classification
- Kingdom: Plantae
- Clade: Tracheophytes
- Clade: Angiosperms
- Clade: Eudicots
- Clade: Rosids
- Order: Rosales
- Family: Moraceae
- Genus: Ficus
- Subgenus: F. subg. Urostigma
- Species: F. destruens

Binomial name
- Ficus destruens F.Muell. ex C.T.White

= Ficus destruens =

Species of Australian fig tree

Ficus destruens is a hemiepiphytic fig that is endemic to the wet tropical rainforests of northeastern Queensland, Australia.

== Description ==
Ficus destruens is a monoecious tree which grows up to 32 m (105 ft) tall. Its leaves are 51–194 mm (2.0–7.6 in) long and 16–63 mm (0.63–2.48 in) wide. Its syconia are orange or red in colour, 13–19 mm (0.51–0.75 in) long and 11–16 mm (0.43–0.63 in) in diameter. It begins life as a hemiepiphyte.
