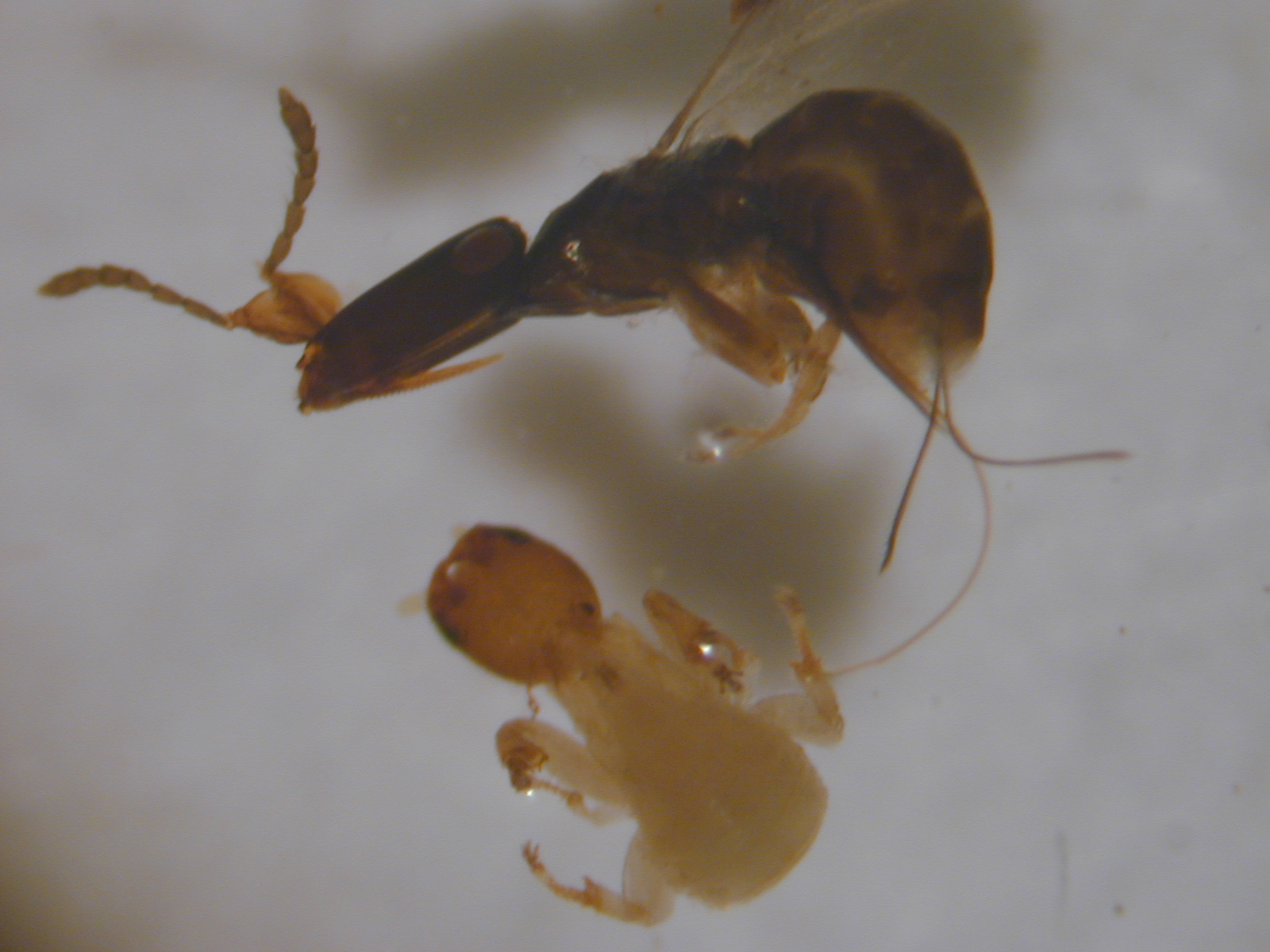
- Male and female from an introduced population on Maui

Scientific classification
- Kingdom: Animalia
- Phylum: Arthropoda
- Clade: Pancrustacea
- Class: Insecta
- Order: Hymenoptera
- Family: Agaonidae
- Subfamily: Agaoninae
- Genus: Pleistodontes
- Species: P. imperialis

Binomial name
- Pleistodontes imperialis Saunders, 1882

Synonyms
- Pleistodontes nigricaput Girault; Pleistodontes nigris Girault

= Pleistodontes imperialis =

Species of wasp

Pleistodontes imperialis is a species of fig wasp which is native to Australia. It has an obligate mutualism with Ficus rubiginosa, the fig species it pollinates. It is the type species of the genus Pleistodontes.
