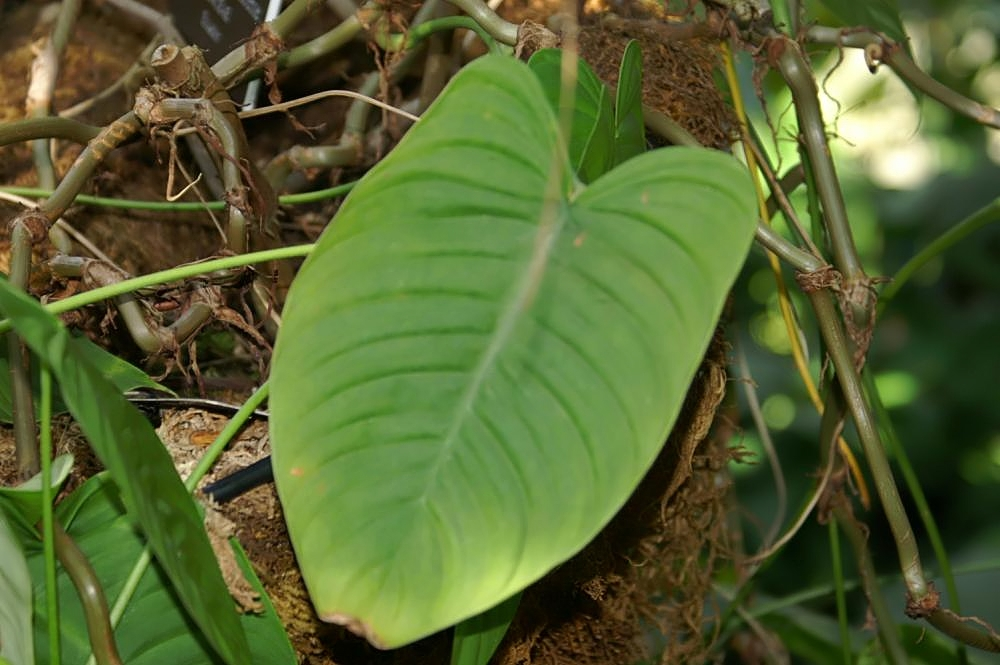
- Wild-type leaf

Scientific classification
- Kingdom: Plantae
- Clade: Tracheophytes
- Clade: Angiosperms
- Clade: Monocots
- Order: Alismatales
- Family: Araceae
- Genus: Philodendron
- Species: P. tenue

Binomial name
- Philodendron tenue K.Koch & Augustin

Synonyms
- Philodendron ecuadorense Engl.; Philodendron gracile Schott; Philodendron sodiroanum Engl.

= Philodendron tenue =

Species of plant

Philodendron tenue is a species of flowering plant in the family Araceae. It is native to wet tropical areas of southern Central America, Colombia, Venezuela and Ecuador. A hemiepiphyte, it is found in variety of woodland and forest types at elevations from 20 to 2,300 m (70 to 7,550 ft). Leaf length varies considerably between individuals, possibly to the point of being botanical forms.
