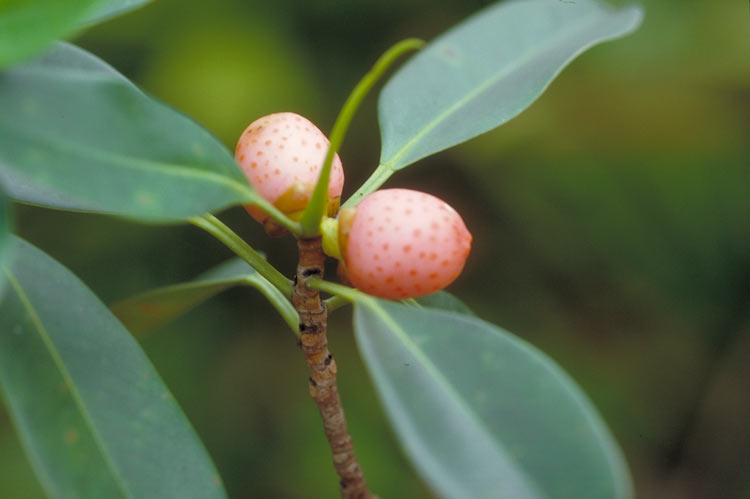
- Shown with fruit

Conservation status
- Least Concern (IUCN 3.1)

Scientific classification
- Kingdom: Plantae
- Clade: Tracheophytes
- Clade: Angiosperms
- Clade: Eudicots
- Clade: Rosids
- Order: Rosales
- Family: Moraceae
- Genus: Ficus
- Species: F. triradiata

Binomial name
- Ficus triradiata Corner

Varieties
- Ficus triradiata var. sessilicarpa Corner; Ficus triradiata var. triradiata

= Ficus triradiata =

Species of epiphyte

Ficus triradiata, commonly known as the red stipule fig, is a hemiepiphytic fig that is endemic to the wet tropical rainforests of northeastern Queensland, Australia.

== Description ==
Ficus triradiata is a monoecious tree which grows up to 25 m (82 ft) tall. Its leaves are 33–163 mm (1.3–6.4 in) long and 10–66 mm (0.39–2.60 in) wide. Its syconia are cream, yellow, orange or pink in colour, 21–26 mm (0.83–1.02 in) long and 15–26 mm (0.59–1.02 in) in diameter. It begins life as a hemiepiphyte.
