= Ficus subpuberula =

Conservation status
- Least Concern (IUCN 3.1)

Scientific classification
- Kingdom: Plantae
- Clade: Tracheophytes
- Clade: Angiosperms
- Clade: Eudicots
- Clade: Rosids
- Order: Rosales
- Family: Moraceae
- Genus: Ficus
- Species: F. subpuberula

Binomial name
- Ficus subpuberula Corner

Synonyms
- Ficus puberula (Miq.) A.Cunn. ex Miq., nom. illeg. homonym. post.; Urostigma puberulum Miq.

Species of fig

Ficus subpuberula is a lithophytic fig that is endemic to Australia. It ranges from extreme western Queensland, through the Northern Territory, into Western Australia.

== Description ==
Ficus subpuberula is a monoecious tree which grows up to 13 m (43 ft) tall. Its leaves are 27–143 mm (1.1–5.6 in) long and 11–68 mm (0.43–2.68 in) wide. Its syconia are yellow, orange or red in colour, 10–24 mm (0.39–0.94 in) long and 9–23 mm (0.35–0.91 in) in diameter.
