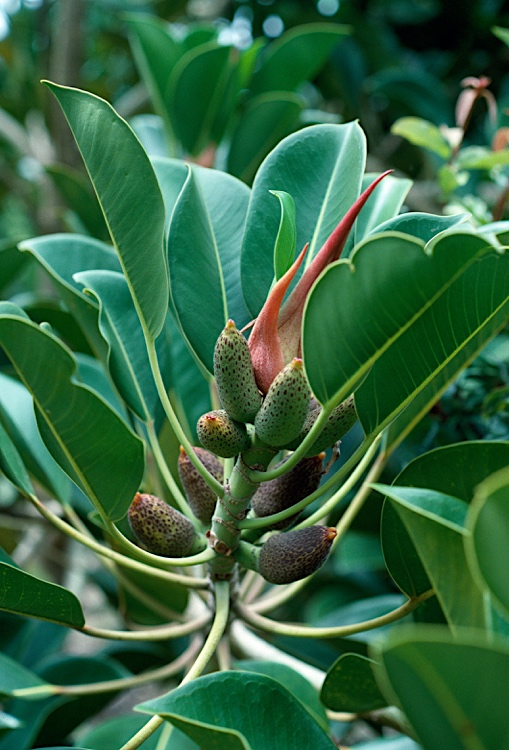

Conservation status
- Least Concern (IUCN 3.1)

Scientific classification
- Kingdom: Plantae
- Clade: Tracheophytes
- Clade: Angiosperms
- Clade: Eudicots
- Clade: Rosids
- Order: Rosales
- Family: Moraceae
- Genus: Ficus
- Subgenus: F. subg. Urostigma
- Species: F. crassipes

Binomial name
- Ficus crassipes F.M.Bailey

= Ficus crassipes =

Species of Australian plant known as the round-leaved banana fig

Ficus crassipes, commonly known as the round-leaved banana fig is a fig that is endemic to the wet tropical rainforests of northeastern Queensland, Australia. It has large brownish cylindrical syconia.

== Description ==
Ficus crassipes is a monoecious tree which grows up to 20 m (66 ft) tall. Its leaves are 76–218 mm (3.0–8.6 in) long and 53–154 mm (2.1–6.1 in) wide. Its syconia are yellowish to orange-brown to purple in colour, 43–68 mm (1.7–2.7 in) long and 15–32 mm (0.59–1.26 in) in diameter. It begins life as a hemiepiphyte.
