= Ficus lilliputiana =

Scientific classification
- Kingdom: Plantae
- Clade: Tracheophytes
- Clade: Angiosperms
- Clade: Eudicots
- Clade: Rosids
- Order: Rosales
- Family: Moraceae
- Genus: Ficus
- Species: F. lilliputiana

Binomial name
- Ficus lilliputiana D.J.Dixon

Species of fig

Ficus lilliputiana is a fig that is endemic to the Kimberleys and Kununurra in northwestern Australia. It was first described in 2001 by Australian botanist Dale J. Dixon.
