= Ficus atricha =

Conservation status
- Least Concern (IUCN 3.1)

Scientific classification
- Kingdom: Plantae
- Clade: Tracheophytes
- Clade: Angiosperms
- Clade: Eudicots
- Clade: Rosids
- Order: Rosales
- Family: Moraceae
- Genus: Ficus
- Species: F. atricha

Binomial name
- Ficus atricha D.J.Dixon

Synonyms
- Ficus platypoda var. cordata Specht

Species of fig

Ficus atricha, commonly known as the rock breaker fig, is a tree in the family Moraceae native to the Northern Territory and northern Western Australia in northwestern Australia. It is a banyan of the genus Ficus which contains around 750 species worldwide in warm climates, including the edible fig (Ficus carica).
