= Guido Grandi (entomologist) =

Italian entomologist

Guido Grandi (3 March 1886, Vigevano – 10 December 1970, Bologna) was an Italian entomologist. In 1928 he founded the Institute of Entomology at the University of Bologna (l'Istituto di Entomologia dell'Università di Bologna).

== Works ==
- "Gli insetti dei caprifichi" (PDF). Riv. Biol. 5: 69–90. 1923.
- "Studio morfologico e biologico della Blastophaga psenes (L.)" (PDF). Boll. Lab. Ent. Bologna. 2: 1–147. 1929.
- "Introduzione allo studio dell'Entomologia" (1951),2300 pages.
- "Studi di un Entomologo sugli Imenotteri superiori" (1961), 650 pages
- "Istituzioni di Entomologia generale" (1966), 700 pages
