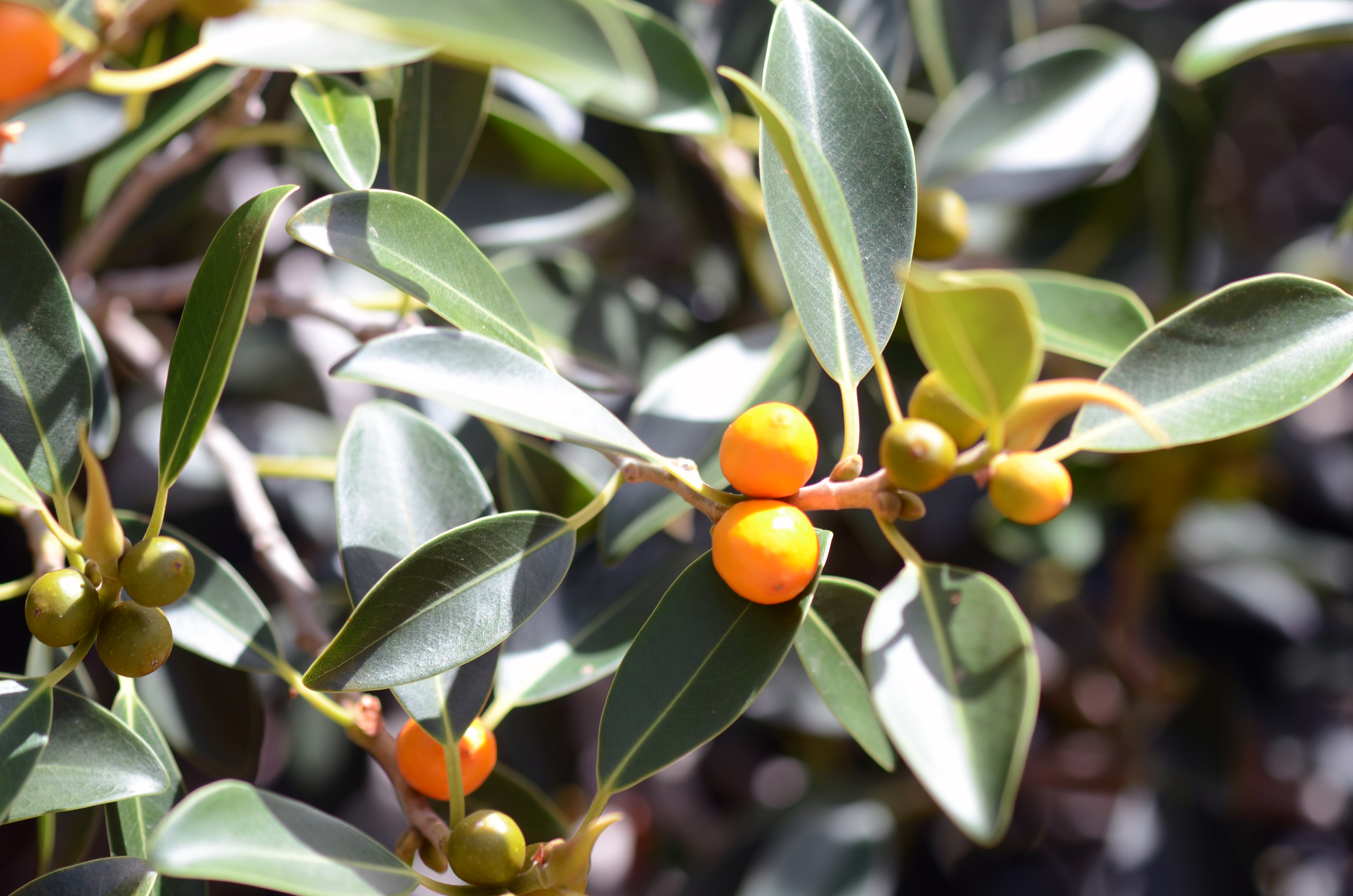

Conservation status
- Least Concern (IUCN 3.1)

Scientific classification
- Kingdom: Plantae
- Clade: Tracheophytes
- Clade: Angiosperms
- Clade: Eudicots
- Clade: Rosids
- Order: Rosales
- Family: Moraceae
- Genus: Ficus
- Species: F. brachypoda

Binomial name
- Ficus brachypoda (Miq.) Miq.

Synonyms
- Ficus eugenioides var. puberula Benth.; Ficus lachnocaulon (Miq.) Miq.; Ficus obliqua var. puberula (Benth.) Corner; Ficus platypoda var. lachnocaulon (Miq.) Benth.; Ficus platypoda var. minor Benth.; Ficus vitellina (Miq.) Miq.; Urostigma brachypodum Miq.; Urostigma lachnocaulon Miq.; Urostigma platypodum f. minor Miq., not validly publ.; Urostigma vitellinum Miq.

= Ficus brachypoda =

Species of fig

Ficus brachypoda is a tree in the family Moraceae native to northern and central Australia and to Timor in the Lesser Sunda Islands. It is a banyan of the genus Ficus which contains around 750 species worldwide in warm climates, including the edible fig (Ficus carica).

Ficus brachypoda is likely a species complex. A new species Ficus desertorum was split from the group.
