= Hemiepiphyte =

Plant that spends part of its life cycle as an epiphyte

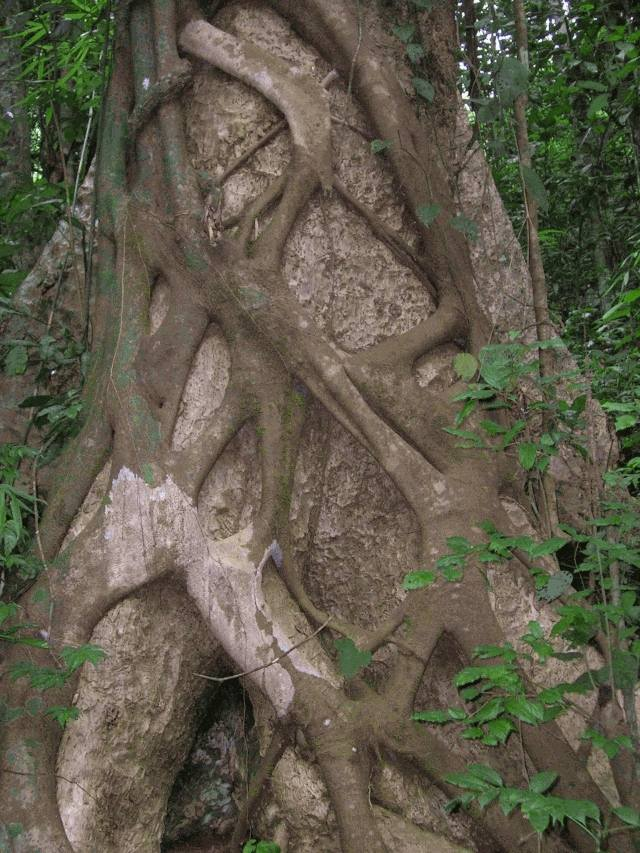
A hemiepiphytic strangler fig in Kerala, India

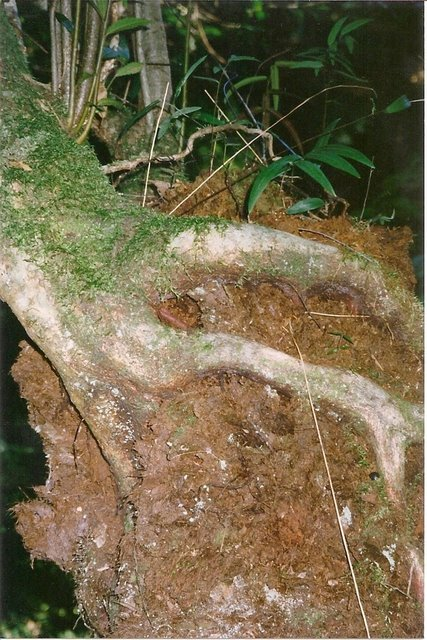
Black olive berry on a soft tree fern at Devil's Creek, Tantawangalo, South East Forest National Park, Australia

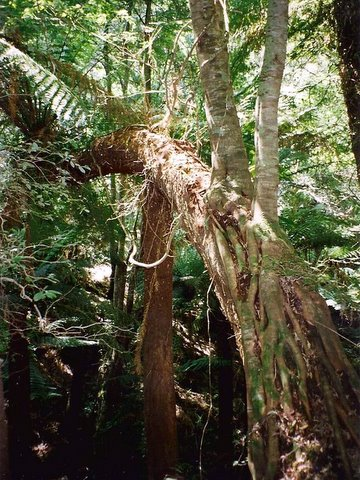
Pinkwood growing as a hemiepiphyte on a soft tree fern at Monga National Park, Australia

A hemiepiphyte is a plant that spends part of its life cycle as an epiphyte. The seeds of primary hemiepiphytes germinate in the canopy and initially live epiphytically. They send roots downward, and these roots eventually make contact with the ground. Secondary hemiepiphytes are root-climbers that begin as rooted vines growing upward from the forest floor, but later break their connection to the ground. When this happens, they may send down long roots to the ground.

Strangler figs are hemiepiphytic – they may begin life as epiphytes but after making contact with the ground they encircle their host tree and "strangle" it. This usually results in the death of the host tree, either through girdling or through competition for light. Strangler figs can also germinate and develop as independent trees, not reliant on the support of a host.
