= Syconium =

Type of fruit produced by plants of the genus Ficus

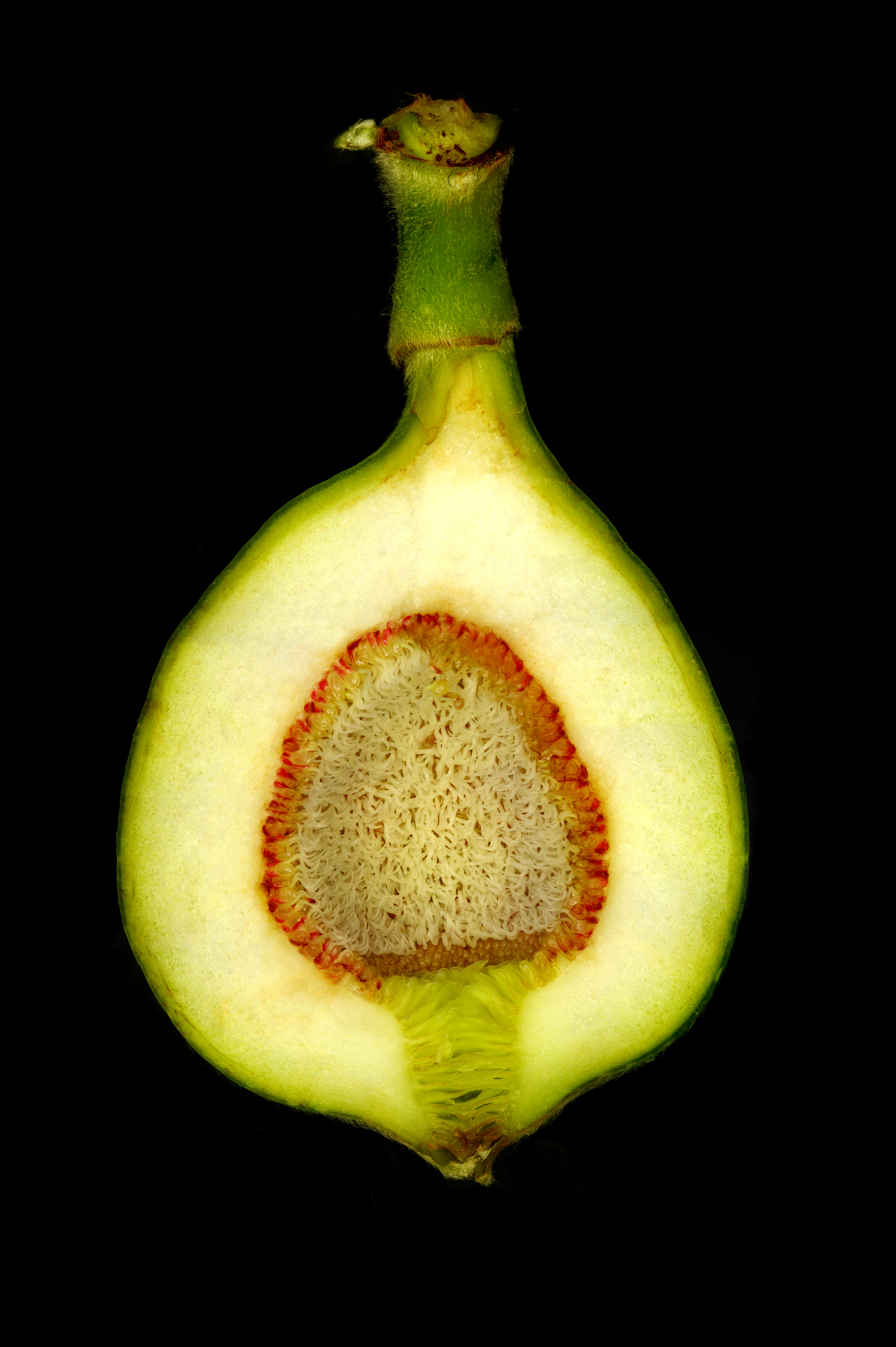
Cross-section of the syconium of a female creeping fig. The receptacle forms a hollow chamber, its inner wall (white) covered by a shell of rufous florets. Their long and curled, white styles occupy the centre. Each floret will produce a fruit and seed. The green, bract-lined ostiole, below, admits wasp pollinators.

Syconium (pl.: syconia) is the type of inflorescence which later becomes fruit in figs (genus Ficus), formed by an enlarged, fleshy, hollow receptacle with multiple ovaries on the inside surface. In essence, it is really a fleshy stem with a number of flowers, so it is considered both a multiple and accessory fruit.

== Etymology ==
The term syconium comes from the Ancient Greek word σῦκον sykon 'fig'.

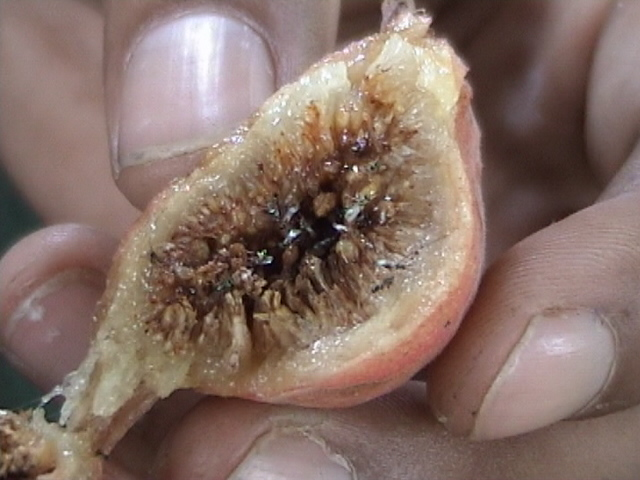
Longitudinal section of Ficus glomerata syconium showing the fruit and fig wasps.

== Morphology ==
The syconium is an urn-shaped receptacle which contains between 50 and 7000 (depending on the species) highly simplified uniovulate flowers or florets on its inner surface. It is closed off from most organisms by the ostiole, fringed by scale-like bracts.

Syconia can be monoecious or functionally dioecious: the former contain female flowers with variable style length and few male flowers, and produce seeds and pollen. The latter have male and female forms in different plants: seed figs contain female flowers with long styles and produce seeds; gall figs contain female flowers with short styles and male flowers and produce pollen.

Once pollinated by a fig wasp, the individual florets inside the syconium develop into achenes or drupes, in which the seeds are enclosed by a layer of endocarp. From this perspective, the fig is an enclosure with tens to thousands of fruits within it.

== Development ==
Formation of the syconium begins with the initial growth of bracts, which curve to form a receptacle. When the outer bracts meet, they form the ostiole by interlock. Syconia may also develop lateral, basal, or peduncular bracts. There is a relationship between the shape of the ostiole and the morphology of the pollinating wasp.

== Pollination ==
The tight ostiolar enclosure at the syconium's apex makes it highly pollinator-specific. When receptive to pollen, the ostiole slightly loosens, allowing the highly specialized wasps to enter through it. The wasps lose their wings in the process, and once inside they pollinate female flowers as they lay their eggs in some ovules, which then form galls. The wasps then die and larvae develop in the galls, while seeds develop in the pollinated flowers. 4–6 weeks after egg laying, the wingless males emerge, mate with the females still in their galls, and cut a tunnel out of the syconium. As the females emerge, they collect pollen from male flowers, which ripen later. After the wasps emerge, chemical changes in the fig follow as the fig develops into 'fruit'.

== Evolution ==
The syconium is thought to have first evolved 83 million years ago in the Cretaceous within an entomophilic clade within Moraceae that includes tribe Castilleae and genus Ficus, as the bracts protecting the inflorescence tightened to form the ostiole. This greatly increased the pollinator specificity of the plant and initiated a long and complex history of coevolution between figs and their pollinating wasps (agaonids).
