= Obligate =

Adjective

As an adjective, obligate means "by necessity" (antonym facultative) and is used mainly in biology in phrases such as:

- Obligate aerobe, an organism that cannot survive without oxygen
- Obligate anaerobe, an organism that cannot survive in the presence of oxygen
- Obligate air-breather, a term used in fish physiology to describe those that respire entirely from the atmosphere
- Obligate biped, an animal that relies solely on walking or running on its two hind limbs for locomotion
- Obligate carnivore, an organism dependent for survival on a diet of animal flesh.
- Obligate chimerism, a kind of organism with two distinct sets of DNA, always
- Obligate hibernation, a state of inactivity in which some organisms survive conditions of insufficiently available resources.
- Obligately intracellular parasite, a parasitic microorganism that cannot reproduce without entering a suitable host cell
- Obligate necrophage, an animal that uses carrion as its sole or main food source and depends on carrion for survival or reproduction
- Obligate parasite, a parasite that cannot reproduce without exploiting a suitable host
- Obligate photoperiodic plant, a plant that requires sufficiently long or short nights before it initiates flowering, germination or similarly functions
- Obligate scavenger, an animal that uses decaying biomass (e.g. carrion, dead plant material) as its sole or main food source and depends on this for survival or reproduction
- Obligate symbionts, organisms that can only live together in a symbiosis

== See also ==
- Opportunism (biological)
