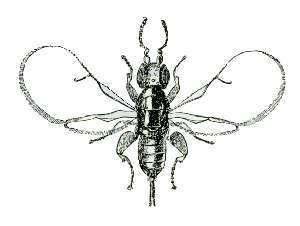
- Blastophaga psenes

Scientific classification
- Kingdom: Animalia
- Phylum: Arthropoda
- Class: Insecta
- Order: Hymenoptera
- Superfamily: Chalcidoidea
- Family: Agaonidae; Walker, 1848

Subfamilies
- Agaoninae; Kradibiinae; Tetrapusiinae

= Agaonidae =

Agaonidae Temporal range: Priabonian–Present

Family of wasps

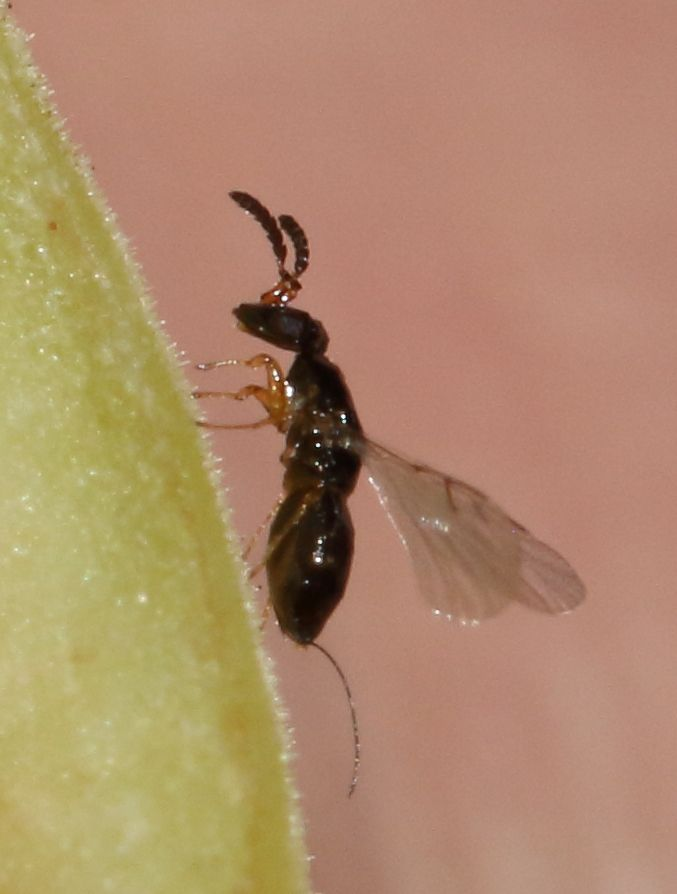
Female Elisabethiella comptoni

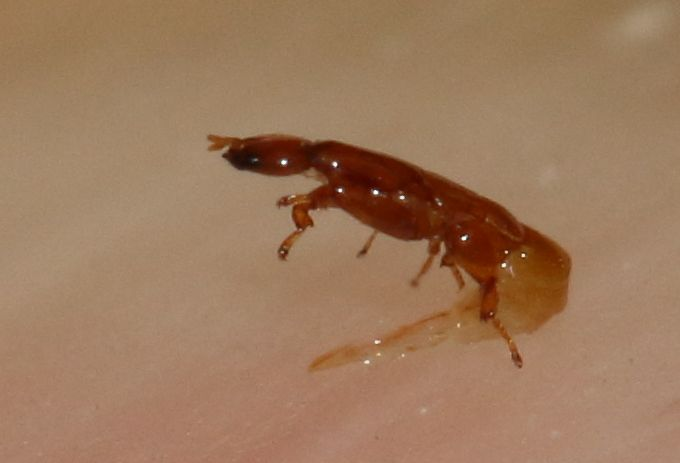
Male Elisabethiella comptoni

The family Agaonidae is a group of pollinating fig wasps. They spend their larval stage inside the fruits of figs. The pollinating wasps (Agaoninae, Kradibiinae, and Tetrapusiinae) are the mutualistic partners of the fig trees. Extinct forms from the Eocene and Miocene are nearly identical to modern forms, suggesting that the niche has been stable over geologic time.

Females emerge from ripe figs and fly to another fig tree with developing syconia (which contain the flowers). They enter the syconium via the ostiole, pollinate the flowers, and lay their eggs in some of the ovules. The ovules containing eggs develop into galls that support the growth of the wasp larvae. Prior to the final ripening of the fig, wingless males emerge from the galls they developed in. The males enter the galls of their winged sibling females, mate with them and die within the fruit. The newly hatched females then make their way out of the fruit continuing this cycle.

== Taxonomy ==
The family has changed several times since its taxonomic appearance after the work of Francis Walker in 1846 described from the wasp genus Agaon. Previously the subfamilies Epichrysomallinae, Otitesellinae, Sycoecinae, Sycoryctinae, Sycophaginae, and Agaoninae were the subdivisions of the family. Recent works building strong molecular phylogenies with an extended sampling size have changed the composition of Agaonidae. The paraphyletic groups have been excluded; Epichrysomallinae was raised to family status (Epichrysomallidae), whereas Otitesellinae, Sycoecinae, Sycophaginae, and Sycoryctinae were transferred to Pteromalidae. New subfamilies have been instated (Kradibiinae and Tetrapusiinae).

== Ecology ==
The relationship between fig trees and agaonid fig wasps is an obligate mutualism that has evolved over a period of about sixty million years.

== Morphological adaptations ==
The pollinating female fig wasps are winged and in general dark, while the males are mostly wingless and whitish. This difference of color is probably due to a clear split in the gender role. Once they have mated, male and female fig wasps have different fates. In some fig species, such as Ficus subpisocarpa or Ficus tinctoria, the males have to chew a hole for the females to leave their natal fig. The winged female wasps can fly over long distances before finding another fig to oviposit in it, while the male dies after chewing a hole. As the fig is closed by a tight ostiole, the female wasps have developed adaptations to enter. First, the mandibles of the female wasps have developed specialized mandibular appendages to help them crawl into the figs. These appendages are adapted to the host fig species, with for instance spiraled ostioles matched by spiral mandibular appendages.

== Subfamilies and genera ==
=== Agaoninae ===
- Agaon Dalman, 1818
- Alfonsiella Waterston, 1920
- Allotriozoon Grandi, 1916
- Blastophaga Gravenhorst, 1829
  - Blastophaga psenes Linnaeus (syn. Cynips psenes Linnaeus, 1758)
- Courtella Kieffer, 1911
- Deilagaon Wiebes, 1977
- Dolichoris Hill, 1967
- Elisabethiella Grandi, 1928
- Eupristina Saunders, 1882
  - Eupristina verticillata Waterston, 1921
- Nigeriella Wiebes 1974
- Paragaon Joseph, 1959
- Pegoscapus Cameron, 1906
- Platyscapa Motschoulsky, 1863
- Pleistodontes Saunders, 1882
- Waterstoniella
- Wiebesia Boucek, 1988

=== Kradibiinae ===
- Ceratosolen Mayr, 1885
- Kradibia Saunders, 1883 (syn. Liporrhopalum Waterston, 1920)

=== Tetrapusiinae ===
- Tetrapus

=== Extinct genera ===
- †Archaeagaon Insect Limestone, United Kingdom, Eocene (Priabonian)
  - †Archaeagaon minutum (Donisthorpe)
