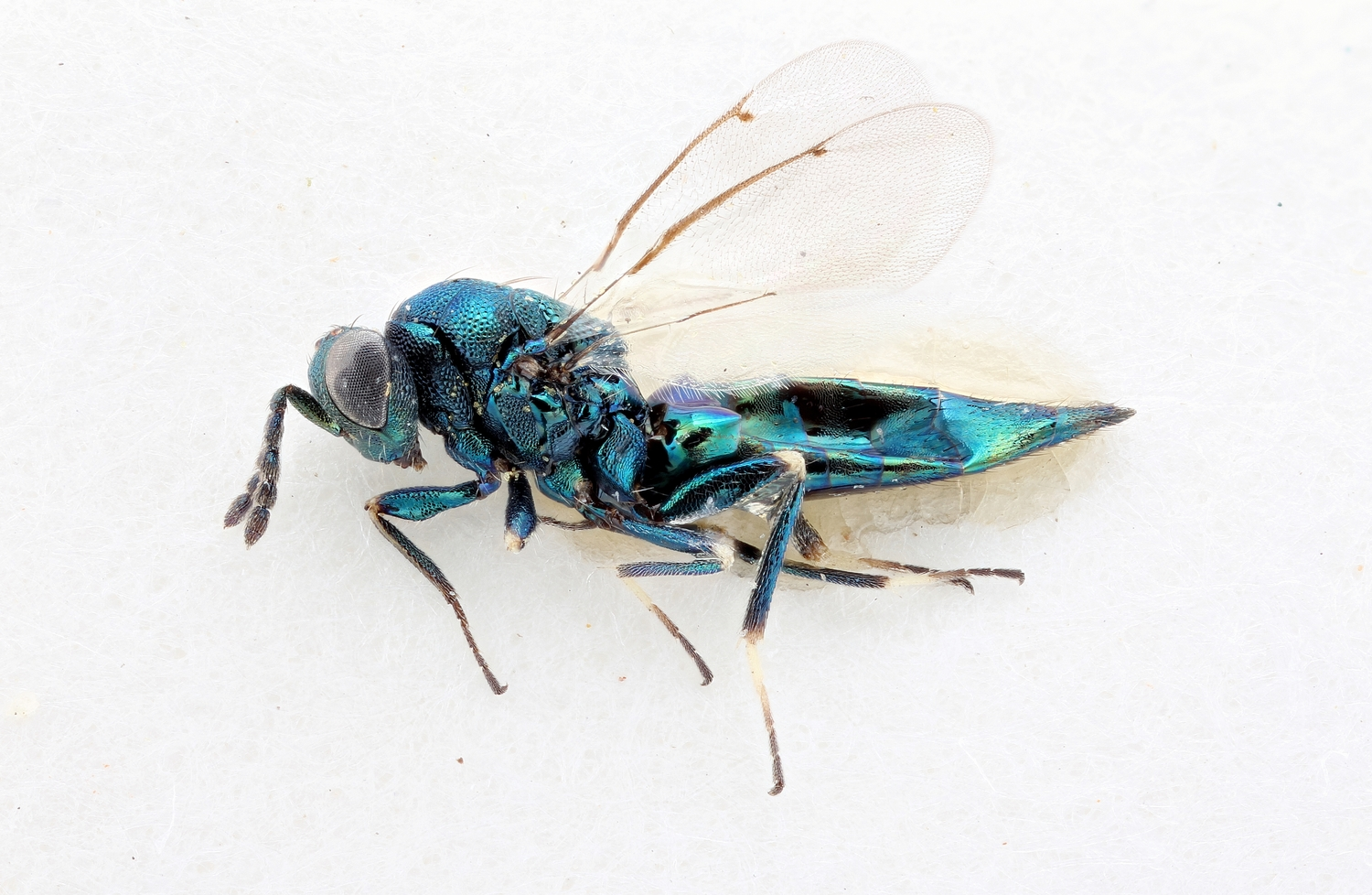
- Entedon sparetus

Scientific classification
- Domain: Eukaryota
- Kingdom: Animalia
- Phylum: Arthropoda
- Class: Insecta
- Order: Hymenoptera
- Family: Eulophidae
- Subfamily: Entedoninae; Förster, 1856

Genera
- See text

Synonyms
- List: Ceranisinae Doganlar and Doganlar, 2013; Entedonidae Förster, 1856; Entedonini Förster, 1856; Entedonoidae Förster, 1856; Entedontinae Förster, 1856; Euderomphalini Shafee, Rizvi and Khan, 1988; Omphalinae Ashmead; Omphalini Ashmead, 1904; Pediobiini Ashmead, 1904

= Entedoninae =

Subfamily of wasps

Entedoninae is a subfamily of wasps in the family Eulophidae. The subfamily includes over 90 genera.

== Genera ==
The following genera are included in the subfamily Entendoninae:

- Acanthala Hansson, 2000
- Achrysocharoides Girault, 1913
- Afrotroppopsis Gumovsky, 2007
- Aleuroctonus LaSalle and Schauff, 1994
- Ambocybe Ubaidillah and LaSalle, 2000
- Ametallon Ashmead, 1904
- Apleurotropis Girault, 1913
- Asecodes Förster, 1856
- Astichomyiia Girault, 1917
- Baeoentedon Girault, 1915
- Bridarolliella De Santis, 1949
- Cabeza Hansson and LaSalle, 2003
- Ceranisus Walker, 1842
- Chrysocharis Förster, 1856
- Chrysocharodes Ashmead, 1894
- Chrysonotomyia Ashmead, 1904
- Closterocerus Westwood, 1833
- Clypecharis Gumovsky, 2003
- Clypomphale Boucek, 1988
- Colpixys Waterston, 1916
- Cornugon Hansson, 2011
- Dasyomphale LaSalle and Schauff, 1994
- Davincia Girault, 1924
- Dentalion Hansson, 2011
- Derostenoides Girault, 1915
- Derostenus Westwood, 1833
- Dinopteridion Hansson, 2004
- Driopteron Hansson, 2004
- Dubeyiella Khan, Agnohitri and Sushil, 2005
- Emersonella Girault, 1916
- Encyrtomphale Girault, 1915
- Entedon Dalman, 1820
- Entedonomphale Girault, 1915
- Entedononecremnus Girault, 1915
- Epichrysoatomus Girault, 1916
- Eprhopalotus Girault, 1916
- Euderomphale Girault, 1916
- Goetheana Girault, 1920
- Grassator De Santis, 1948
- Hakuna Gumovsky and Boucek, 2006
- Holarcticesa Koçak and Kemal, 2010
- Horismenoides Girault, 1913
- Horismenus Walker, 1843
- Inti Hansson, 2010
- Ionympha Graham, 1959
- Itahipeus Hansson and LaSalle, 2003
- Janicharis Gumovsky and Delvare, 2006
- Klyngon Hansson, 2005
- Kokandia Efremova and Kriskovich, 1995
- Mestocharis Förster, 1878
- Microdonophagus Schauff, 1986
- Monteithius Boucek, 1988
- Monterrondo Hansson and LaSalle, 2003
- Myrmobomyia Gumovsky and Boucek, 2005
- Myrmokata Boucek, 1972
- Neochrysocharis Kurdjumov, 1912
- Neopediobopsis Narendran, 1994
- Neopomphale LaSalle and Schauff, 1994
- Obesulus Boucek, 1988
- Omphale Haliday, 1833
- Omphalentedon Girault, 1915
- Oradis Hansson, 2002
- Paphagus Walker, 1843
- Paracrias Ashmead, 1904
- Parahorismenus Girault, 1915
- Parzaommomyia Girault, 1915
- Pediobius Walker, 1846
- Pediobomyia Girault, 1913
- Pediobopsis Girault, 1913
- Pediocharis Boucek, 1988
- Pelorotelus Ashmead, 1904
- Perditorulus Hansson, 1996
- Piekna Boucek, 1988
- Platocharis Kerrich, 1969
- Pleurotropopseus Girault, 1913
- Pleurotroppopsis Girault, 1913
- Pomphale Husain, Rauf and Kudeshia, 1983
- Proacrias H. von Ihering, 1914
- Rhynchentedon Girault, 1919
- Sanyangia Yang, 1996
- Sarasvatia Hedqvist, 1976
- Schizocharis Kerrich, 1969
- Shardiella Sushil and Khan, 1997
- Sifraneurus Hansson and LaSalle, 2003
- Sporrongia Gumovsky, 1998
- Tanava Brèthes, 1918
- Thripobius Ferrière, 1938
- Tropicharis Hansson, 1998
- Uroderostenus Ashmead, 1904
- Xenopomphale Hansson and LaSalle, 2003
- Xiphentedon Risbec, 1957
- Zaommomentedon Girault, 1915
- Zaommomyiella Girault, 1913
