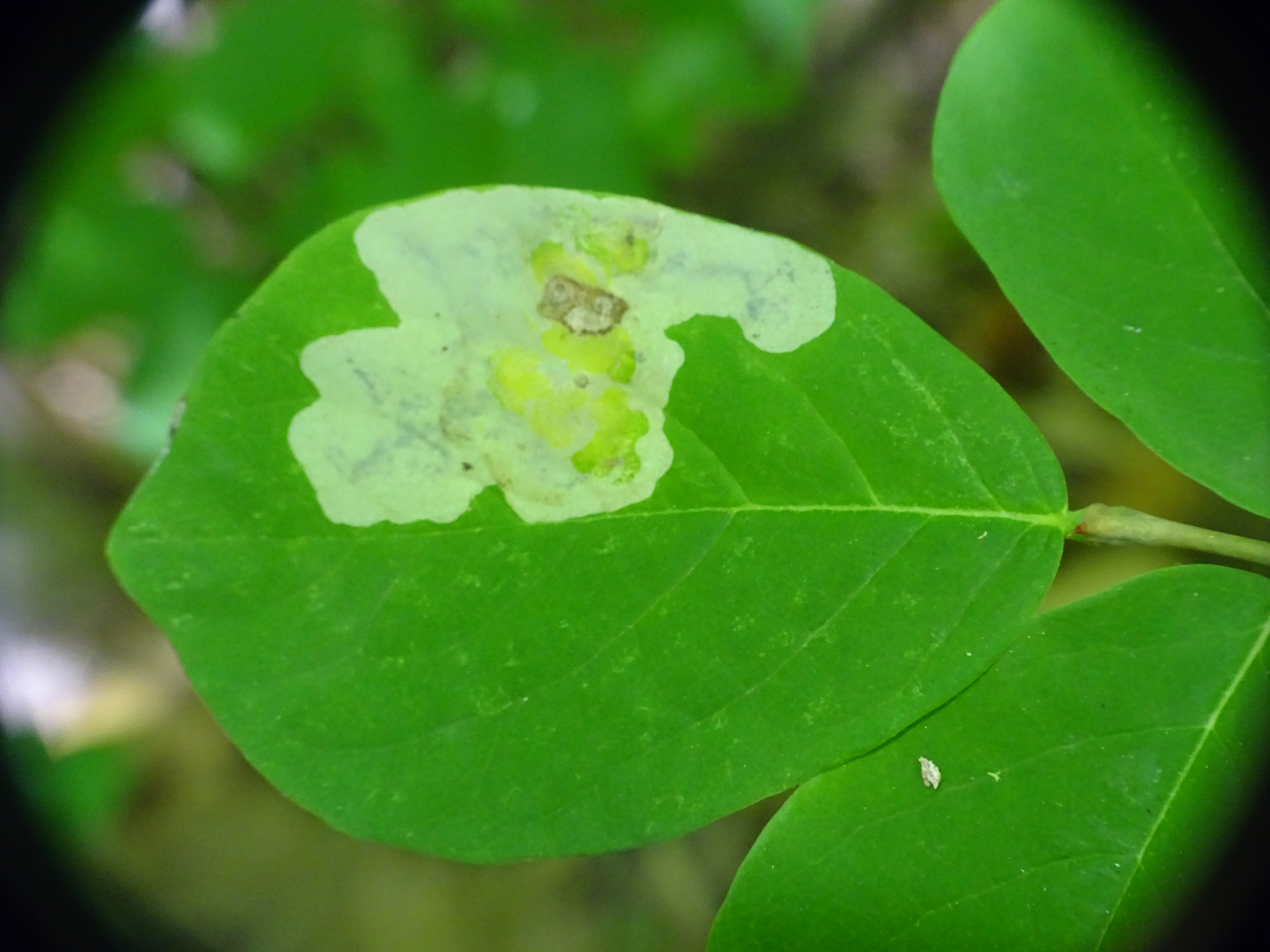
- Leaf mine of Leucanthiza dircella larvae

Scientific classification
- Kingdom: Animalia
- Phylum: Arthropoda
- Class: Insecta
- Order: Lepidoptera
- Family: Gracillariidae
- Genus: Leucanthiza
- Species: L. dircella

Binomial name
- Leucanthiza dircella Braun, 1914

= Leucanthiza dircella =

Species of moth

Leucanthiza dircella is a species of moth in the family Gracillariidae. It is known from Canada (Québec and Ontario), and the United States (including California, Kentucky, Ohio, Michigan, Vermont and Maine).

== Life history ==
A study in northern Michigan determined this species to complete one generation per year. The larvae feed by mining the leaves of Dirca palustris. They are the only known leafminer of this particular host plant.

Multiple species of wasp are known to parasitize Leucanthiza dircella, including members of the genera Pholetesor, Chrysocharis, Closterocerus, Pnigalio, and Sympiesis.
