= Asecodes =

Scientific classification
- Domain: Eukaryota
- Kingdom: Animalia
- Phylum: Arthropoda
- Class: Insecta
- Order: Hymenoptera
- Family: Eulophidae
- Subfamily: Entedoninae
- Genus: Asecodes; Förster, 1856

Type species
- Asecodes congruens (Nees, 1834)

Species
- Achrysocharis atripes Girault, 1915; Asecodes caterinae Viggiani, 1978; Asecodes congruens (Nees, 1834); Asecodes delucchii (Boucek, 1971); Asecodes galerucae Askew, 1978; Asecodes hyperion Graham, 1963; Asecodes lagus (Walker, 1838); Asecodes lineophagum Hansson & Hambäck, 2013; Asecodes lucens (Nees, 1834)

Genus of wasps

Asecodes is a genus of hymenopteran insects of the family Eulophidae. They are endoparasitoids of Galerucella larvae.
