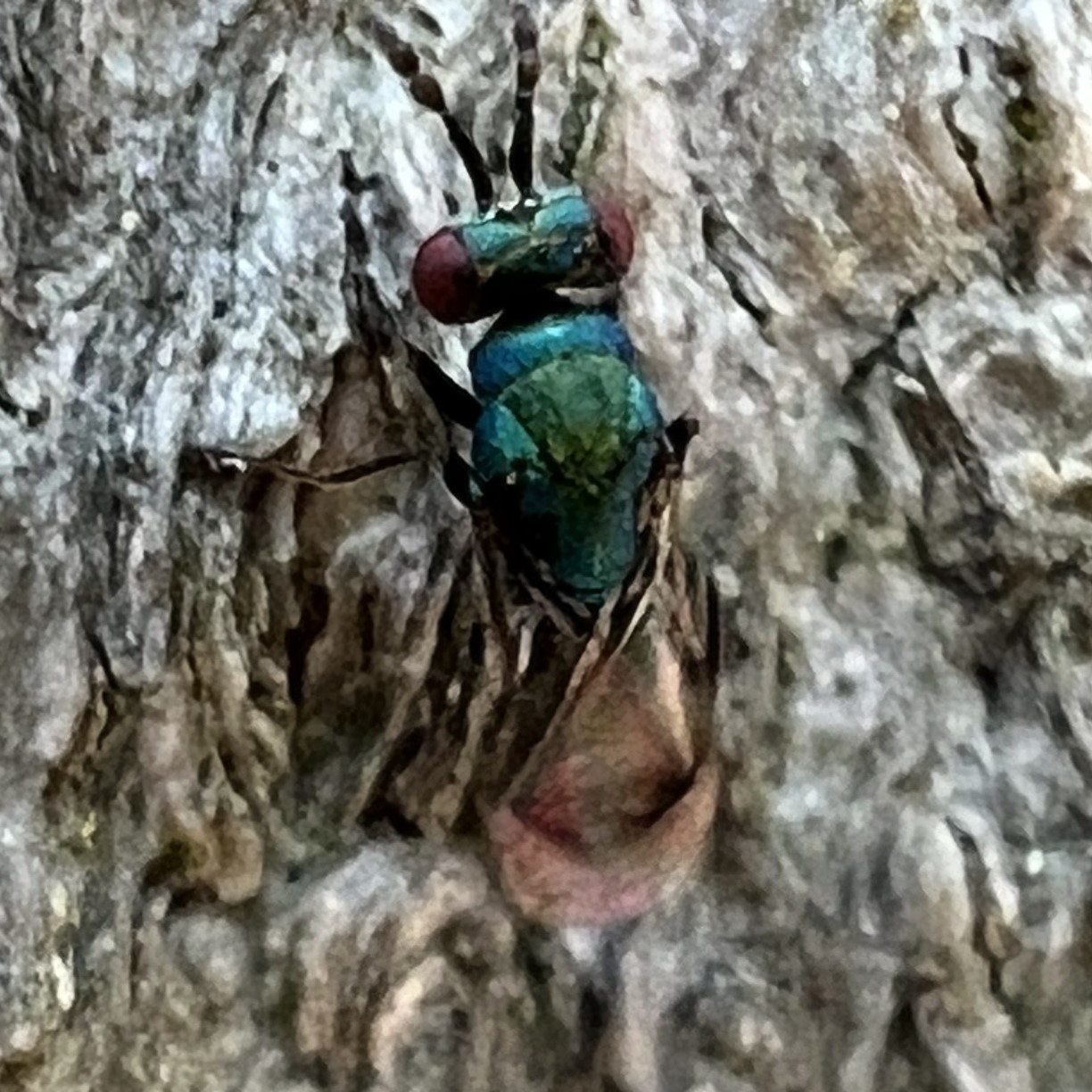

Scientific classification
- Kingdom: Animalia
- Phylum: Arthropoda
- Clade: Pancrustacea
- Class: Insecta
- Order: Hymenoptera
- Family: Eulophidae
- Subfamily: Eulophinae
- Genus: Aulogymnus; Förster, 1851

Type species
- Aulogymnus aceris Förster, 1851

Species
- See text

Synonyms
- Olinx Förster, 1851; Cyniphoctonus Reinhard, 1858; Mirolynx Girault, 1916; Olynx Förster, 1856; Ophelinoideus Ashmead, 1904; Pseudiglyphella Girault, 1913; Pseudolynx Girault, 1916; Scotolinx Ashmead, 1904

= Aulogymnus =

Genus of wasps

Aulogymnus is a genus of hymenopteran insects in the family Eulophidae which includes 38 species. It was described by Förster in 1851.

== Species ==
- Aulogymnus aceris Förster, 1851
- Aulogymnus albipes Askew, 1959
- Aulogymnus arifaokhani Özdikmen, 2011
- Aulogymnus arsames Walker, 1838
- Aulogymnus balani Pujade-Villar, 1991
- Aulogymnus bicolor Askew, 1975
- Aulogymnus bivestigatus Ratzeburg, 1844
- Aulogymnus bouceki Schauff & Gates, 2005
- Aulogymnus caelestis Girault, 1913
- Aulogymnus california Gordh, 1977
- Aulogymnus chilonis Munakata, 1912
- Aulogymnus defrizi Storozheva, 1995
- Aulogymnus elevatus Zhu, LaSalle & Huang, 1999
- Aulogymnus euedoreschus Walker, 1839
- Aulogymnus flavimacalatus Girault, 1916
- Aulogymnus flavitibae Girault, 1916
- Aulogymnus fumatus Ratzeburg, 1852
- Aulogymnus gallarum Linnaeus, 1761
- Aulogymnus gallicola Ashmead, 1904
- Aulogymnus gorditus Schauff & Gates, 2005
- Aulogymnus hyalopterus Zhu, LaSalle & Huang, 1999
- Aulogymnus indicus Arifa & Khan, 1992
- Aulogymnus insculptus Zhu, LaSalle & Huang, 1999
- Aulogymnus io Girault, 1916
- Aulogymnus japonicus Ashmead, 1904
- Aulogymnus kelebiana Erdös, 1958
- Aulogymnus longicalcar Zhu, LaSalle & Huang, 1999
- Aulogymnus minyas Walker, 1847
- Aulogymnus obscuripes Mayr, 1877
- Aulogymnus purpurascens Schauff & Gates, 2005
- Aulogymnus purpureus Girault, 1913
- Aulogymnus pygmaeus Szelényi, 1980
- Aulogymnus skianeuros Ratzeburg, 1844
- Aulogymnus smithi Schauff & Gates, 2005
- Aulogymnus striata Förster, 1856
- Aulogymnus testaceovirdis Erdös, 1961
- Aulogymnus trilineatus Mayr, 1877
- Aulogymnus virginiensis Schauff & Gates, 2005
