= Baeoentedon bouceki =

Scientific classification
- Kingdom: Animalia
- Phylum: Arthropoda
- Clade: Pancrustacea
- Class: Insecta
- Order: Hymenoptera
- Family: Eulophidae
- Subfamily: Entedoninae
- Genus: Baeoentedon
- Species: B. bouceki

Binomial name
- Baeoentedon bouceki Wang, Huang & Polaszek, 2014

Species of wasp

Baeoentedon bouceki is a species of wasp, one of the first three members of the genus Baeoentedon to be discovered in China. It is less than a millimetre in length, with a head slightly wider than the middle portion of the body. Only one specimen has been studied, collected from Hainan in 1983. As that specimen is female, the appearance of males is unknown.

== Taxonomy ==
The genus that Baeoentedon bouceki belongs to, Baeoentedon, was erected in 1915 by Alexandre Arsène Girault. It contained a single species, B. peculicornis, known only from a single female from Queensland, Australia. No further biological information or additional species were identified until 2014, when Zhu-Hong Wang, Jian Huang, and Andrew Polaszek published descriptions of three new Chinese species, including B. bouceki. The holotype of B. bouceki was originally collected from the Jian Feng Mountains in Hainan, China in 1983, by Zdeněk Bouček, in honour of whom the species is named.

== Description ==
Only one specimen of Baeoentedon bouceki has been studied, a female (the appearance of the male is still unknown). The individual is 0.87 millimetres (0.034 in) long, with a metallic blue-black head and mesosoma (middle part of the body). The head is slightly wider than the mesosoma. The belly is mostly dark to black, except for the first and second terga (the upper portions of their segments), which are yellow-brown to dark brown. The base of the antenatal scape (the first part of the antenna), is pale brown, while the upper part is pale white. The pedicel (the second part of the antenna) is mostly white, with a dark brown spot towards the bottom. There are two annuli (ring-shaped components above the pedicel), which are dark brown and wider than they are long. The clava and funicle (the topmost parts of the antenna) are brown to dark brown. The forewings are broad, but longer than they are wide. The ovipositor (a tool used by certain species to deposit eggs) does not extend beyond the end of the mesosoma.

== Ecology ==
The subfamily that Baeoentedon bouceki belongs to, Entedoninae, contains multiple species known for parasitising members of the family Aleyrodidae, referred to as whiteflies. The host of B. bouceki itself is presently unknown.
