= Aulogymnus aceris =

Scientific classification
- Kingdom: Animalia
- Phylum: Arthropoda
- Clade: Pancrustacea
- Class: Insecta
- Order: Hymenoptera
- Family: Eulophidae
- Genus: Aulogymnus
- Species: A. aceris

Binomial name
- Aulogymnus aceris Förster, 1851

Species of insect

Aulogymnus aceris is a species of insect from the Eulophidae family. It was described by Förster in 1851, and was the sole member of the Aulogymnus family before it was expanded. It is prominently colored citrine and black.

== Etymology ==
The specific epithet is derived from the scientific name for maple plants, Acer. This refers to the gall wasp Pediaspis aceris, which is known for attacking maple trees. Aulogymnus aceris hosts on this species of wasp.

== Distribution ==
The species is located in Western Europe, in the countries of Spain, France, Switzerland, Austria, Belgium, Germany, Croatia, and the Netherlands.
