= Eprhopalotus =

Scientific classification
- Kingdom: Animalia
- Phylum: Arthropoda
- Class: Insecta
- Order: Hymenoptera
- Family: Eulophidae
- Subfamily: Entedoninae
- Genus: Eprhopalotus; Girault, 1916

Type species
- Eprhopalotus purpureithorax Girault, 1916

Species
- See text

Synonyms
- Aabacharis (Schauff, M.E. 1991)

Genus of wasps

Eprhopalotus is a genus of hymenopteran insects of the family Eulophidae. Their distribution varies between species but ranges from Costa Rica, Mexico to Texas. There are currently 5 species of Eprhopalotus:

- Eprhopalotus canaliculat Hansson, 2004
- Eprhopalotus cordylatus Hansson, 2004
- Eprhopalotus crinitus Hansson, 2004
- Eprhopalotus hansoni Hansson, 2004
- Eprhopalotus purpureithorax Girault, 1916

While Aabacharis is a synonym of Eprhopalotus, it applies in particular when referring to the species hansoni; hence it has been sourced as both Aabacharis hansoni and Eprhopalotus hansoni.
