= Entedonomphale =

Scientific classification
- Kingdom: Animalia
- Phylum: Arthropoda
- Class: Insecta
- Order: Hymenoptera
- Family: Eulophidae
- Subfamily: Entedoninae
- Genus: Entedonomphale; Girault, 1915

Type species
- Entedonomphale margiscutum Girault, 1915

Species
- 14 species

Genus of wasps

Entedonomphale is a genus of hymenopteran insects of the family Eulophidae. The members of this genus are parasitoids of thrips.
