= Pediobopsis =

Scientific classification
- Kingdom: Animalia
- Phylum: Arthropoda
- Class: Insecta
- Order: Hymenoptera
- Family: Eulophidae
- Subfamily: Entedoninae
- Genus: Pediobopsis; Girault, 1913

Type species
- Pediobopsis spenceri Girault, 1913

Species
- Pediobopsis pellucidula (Crosby, 1909); Pediobopsis spenceri Girault, 1913

Genus of wasps

Pediobopsis is a genus of hymenopteran insects of the family Eulophidae.
