= Baeoentedon =

Scientific classification
- Domain: Eukaryota
- Kingdom: Animalia
- Phylum: Arthropoda
- Class: Insecta
- Order: Hymenoptera
- Family: Eulophidae
- Subfamily: Entedoninae
- Genus: Baeoentedon; Girault, 1915

Type species
- Baeoentedon peculicornis Girault, 1915

Species
- Baeoentedon balios Wang, Huang & Polaszek, 2014; Baeoentedon bouceki Wang, Huang & Polaszek, 2014; Baeoentodon farazi Jamali & Bin Zeya, 2017; Baeoentedon peculicornis Girault, 1915; Baeoentedon virgatus Wang, Huang & Polaszek, 2014

Genus of wasps

Baeoentedon is a genus of hymenopteran insects of the family Eulophidae, they are parasitoids of whitefly from the family Aleyrodidae which are found on trees of the genus Ficus. They have been recorded from Australia, China, India, Indonesia and Florida. A fifth species, Baeoentodon farazi, was described from Karnataka, India, in 2017.
