= Omphalentedon =

Scientific classification
- Kingdom: Animalia
- Phylum: Arthropoda
- Class: Insecta
- Order: Hymenoptera
- Family: Eulophidae
- Subfamily: Entedoninae
- Genus: Omphalentedon; Girault, 1915

Type species
- Omphalentedon longus Girault, 1915

Species
- Omphalentedon dasi Narendran and Sheeba, 2006; Omphalentedon longus Girault, 1915

Genus of wasps

Omphalentedon is a genus of hymenopteran insects of the family Eulophidae.
