= Zaommomentedon =

Scientific classification
- Kingdom: Animalia
- Phylum: Arthropoda
- Class: Insecta
- Order: Hymenoptera
- Family: Eulophidae
- Subfamily: Entedoninae
- Genus: Zaommomentedon; Girault, 1915

Type species
- Zaommomentedon mandibularis Girault, 1915

Species
- Zaommomentedon brevipetiolatus Kamijo, 1990; Zaommomentedon mandibularis Girault, 1915; Zaommomentedon milletiae (Kerrich, 1969); Zaommomentedon nepticulae (Hedqvist, 1976); Zaommomentedon newbyi (Kerrich, 1969)

Synonyms
- Visnuella Hedqvist, 1976

Genus of wasps

Zaommomentedon is a genus of hymenopteran insects of the family Eulophidae.
