= Mestocharis =

Scientific classification
- Domain: Eukaryota
- Kingdom: Animalia
- Phylum: Arthropoda
- Class: Insecta
- Order: Hymenoptera
- Family: Eulophidae
- Subfamily: Entedoninae
- Genus: Mestocharis; Förster, 1878

Type species
- Mestocharis cyclospila (Förster, 1841)

Species
- Mestocharis bimacularis (Dalman, 1820); Mestocharis maculate (Förster, 1841); Mestocharis tropicalis Yoshimoto, 1976

Genus of wasps

Mestocharis is a genus of hymenopteran insects of the family Eulophidae.
