= Epichrysocharis =

Scientific classification
- Kingdom: Animalia
- Phylum: Arthropoda
- Class: Insecta
- Order: Hymenoptera
- Family: Eulophidae
- Subfamily: Tetrastichinae
- Genus: Epichrysocharis; Girault, 1913

Type species
- Epichrysocharis fusca (Girault, 1913)

Species
- Epichrysocharis aligherini (Girault, 1922); Epichrysocharis burwelli Schauff, 2000; Epichrysocharis fusca (Girault, 1913); Epichrysocharis nigriventris (Girault, 1913)

Genus of wasps

Epichrysocharis is a genus of hymenopteran insects of the family Eulophidae.
