= Derostenoides =

Scientific classification
- Domain: Eukaryota
- Kingdom: Animalia
- Phylum: Arthropoda
- Class: Insecta
- Order: Hymenoptera
- Family: Eulophidae
- Subfamily: Entedoninae
- Genus: Derostenoides; Girault, 1915

Species
- Derostenoides neglectus Girault, 1915

Genus of wasps

Derostenoides is a genus of hymenopteran insects of the family Eulophidae.
