= Baeoentedon balios =

Scientific classification
- Domain: Eukaryota
- Kingdom: Animalia
- Phylum: Arthropoda
- Class: Insecta
- Order: Hymenoptera
- Family: Eulophidae
- Subfamily: Entedoninae
- Genus: Baeoentedon
- Species: B. balios

Binomial name
- Baeoentedon balios Wang, Huang & Polaszek, 2014

Species of wasp

Baeoentedon balios, the balios wasp, is a species of chalcid wasp which was first described from China in 2014. It is a parasitoid of whiteflies of the family Aleyrodidae.

== Description ==
Baeoentedon balios adults are around 0.9 mm in length, the head and thorax are metallic blue-black in colour, while the abdomen is pale yellow. The antennae have a largely white scape with a pale pedicel and its legs are coloured pale yellow. The hyaline forewing has an apical transverse brown cloud.

== Distribution ==
Baeoentedon balios was described in 2014 from specimens taken from Xiamen in Fujian, in December 2014 it was discovered in Homestead, Florida, the first record of the genus Baeoentedon in the New World. A survey in 2015 recorded balios wasps in four counties of southern Florida, Broward, Miami-Dade, Monroe, and Palm Beach. Within Florida the wasp is likely to be spread by being transported with Ficus trees infested with whiteflies.

== Biology ==
Baeoentedon balios is a parasitoid of whitefly, specifically ficus whiteflies. The type specimen was reared from Pealius spina which had been collected on Ficus religiosa. These wasps develop through six distinct stages from the egg through three larval instars, a pupa like stage and an imago and this takes 19–24 days at room temperature. They are able to parasitise whitefly nymphs in the first, second and third instars but they appear to prefer the second instar. As well as parasitizing the nymphs the wasps can also cause high level of mortality among them when they are probed by or fed on by the adults, 76% of the first instar nymphs which were probed or fed on by adult balios wasps subsequently died. A parasitized nymph has a tiny pinhole on its right side in the middle and turns dark yellow and as it grows the asp larva can be visible. When the adult wasp emerges it creates a neat round hole in the nymph's exoskeleton. Encarsia variegate has been recorded as a hyperparasitoid of B. balios. B. balios has only been recorded as parasitizing two species of host, Pealius spina in China and Singhiella simplex in Florida, both are ficus whiteflies and in Florida most specimens of B. balios were found on Ficus benjamina which is a popular hedging tree in that region. Since its discovery in Florida B balios has been found to be the dominant and most consistent parasitoid to attack ficus whitefly.
