= Emersonella =

Scientific classification
- Kingdom: Animalia
- Phylum: Arthropoda
- Class: Insecta
- Order: Hymenoptera
- Family: Eulophidae
- Subfamily: Entedoninae
- Genus: Emersonella; Girault, 1916

Type species
- Emersonella lemae Girault, 1916

Species
- 56 Species

Genus of wasps

Emersonella is a genus of hymenopteran insects of the family Eulophidae. Several species are known to be phoretic parasitoids of female tortoise beetles, laying their eggs in the eggs of the beetle host.
