= Achrysocharoides =

Scientific classification
- Domain: Eukaryota
- Kingdom: Animalia
- Phylum: Arthropoda
- Class: Insecta
- Order: Hymenoptera
- Family: Eulophidae
- Subfamily: Entedoninae
- Genus: Achrysocharoides; Girault, 1913

Type species
- Achrysocharoides sarcophagus (Girault, 1913)

Species
- 66 species

Synonyms
- Kratoysma Bouček

Genus of wasps

Achrysocharoides is a genus of hymenopteran insects of the family Eulophidae.
