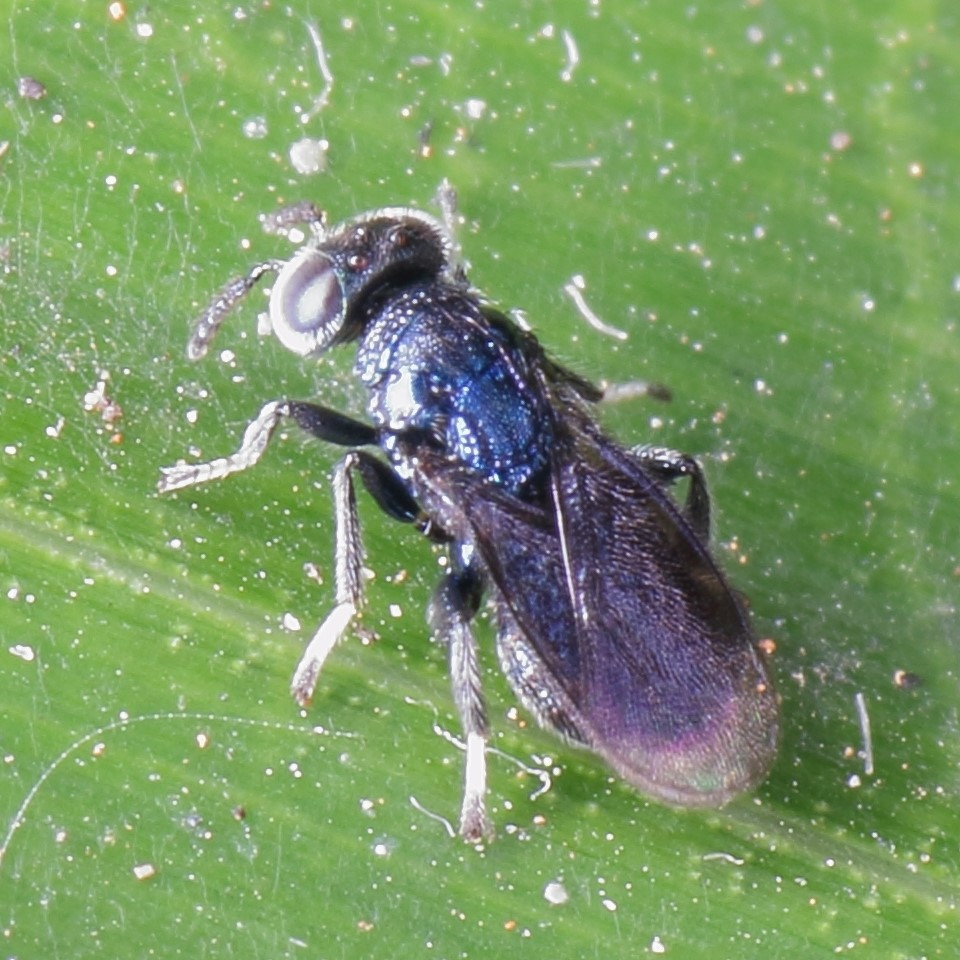
- Pleurotroppopsis podagrica

Scientific classification
- Domain: Eukaryota
- Kingdom: Animalia
- Phylum: Arthropoda
- Class: Insecta
- Order: Hymenoptera
- Family: Eulophidae
- Subfamily: Entedoninae
- Genus: Pleurotroppopsis; Girault, 1913

Type species
- Pleurotroppopsis maculatipennis Girault, 1913

Synonyms
- Atullya Surekha and Narendran, 1988; Cotterellia Waterston, 1925

= Pleurotroppopsis =

Genus of wasps

Pleurotroppopsis is a genus of hymenopteran insects of the family Eulophidae.

== Species ==
The following species are recognised in the genus Pleurotroppopsis:

- Pleurotroppopsis dentate (Surekha and Narendran, 1988)
- Pleurotroppopsis femorata (Surekha and Narendran, 1988)
- Pleurotroppopsis hirta (Kamijo, 1977)
- Pleurotroppopsis japonica (Kamijo, 1977)
- Pleurotroppopsis javana (Boucek, 1976)
- Pleurotroppopsis lankensis (Kerrich, 1974)
- Pleurotroppopsis lunata Kamijo, 1990
- Pleurotroppopsis maculatipennis Girault, 1913
- Pleurotroppopsis nitifrons Boucek, 1976
- Pleurotroppopsis pilosa (Risbec, 1952)
- Pleurotroppopsis podagrica (Waterston, 1925)
- Pleurotroppopsis tischeriae (Kamijo, 1977)
