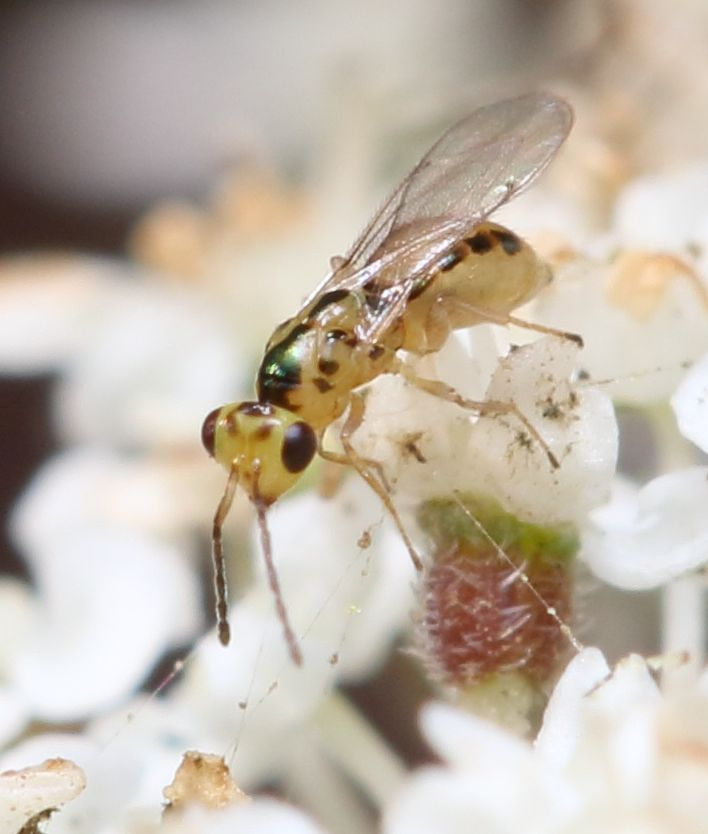

Scientific classification
- Kingdom: Animalia
- Phylum: Arthropoda
- Clade: Pancrustacea
- Class: Insecta
- Order: Hymenoptera
- Family: Eulophidae
- Subfamily: Tetrastichinae
- Genus: Neotrichoporoides; Girault, 1913

Type species
- Neotrichoporoides uniguttatus Girault, 1913

Species
- 71 species

= Neotrichoporoides =

Genus of wasps

Neotrichoporoides is genus Eulophid wasps that belongs to the subfamily Tetrastichinae.

Their bodies usually have a dark color, often with a distinct metallic luster. Their bodies may also be entirely yellow and dull.

== Taxonomy ==
Since the description of genus Neotrichoporoides and its type species Neotrichoporoides uniguttatus in 1913 by American entomologist Alexandre Arsène Girault, this genus has gone through nearly a century of taxonomic revisions.

There have been eight genera that have been synomized under this genus. They are Aprostoceroloides, Tetrastichomorpha, Trichaporoidella, Epiquadrastichus, Paraprostocetus, Burksia, Neogaleopsomyia and Dubiostalon.

=== Species ===
The genus contains approximately 70 species. A list of selected species can be found below;

- Neotrichoporoides aenea (Girault, 1913)
- Neotrichoporoides aeneicorpus xxxx
- Neotrichoporoides algericus Kostjukov, 2004
- Neotrichoporoides arunima Narendran, 2007
- Neotrichoporoides basiflavus Li & Li, 2021
- Neotrichoporoides beonus Narendran, 2006
- Neotrichoporoides beyarslani Doganlar, 1993 - Turkey
- Neotrichoporoides cavigena Graham, 1991
- Neotrichoporoides flavothorax Li & Li, 2021
- Neotrichoporoides mediterraneus Graham, 1986
- Neotrichoporoides nyemitawus (Rohwer, 1921)
- Neotrichoporoides szelenyii (Erdös, 1951)
- Neotrichoporoides uniguttatus Girault, 1913
- Neotrichoporoides viridimaculatus (Fullaway, 1955)
