= Astichomyiia =

Scientific classification
- Domain: Eukaryota
- Kingdom: Animalia
- Phylum: Arthropoda
- Class: Insecta
- Order: Hymenoptera
- Family: Eulophidae
- Subfamily: Entedoninae
- Genus: Astichomyiia; Girault, 1917

Type species
- Astichomyiia latiscapus Girault, 1917

Species
- Astichomyiia cecidicola Hansson, 2002; Astichomyiia crassisteca Hansson, 2002; Astichomyiia hansoni Hansson, 2002; Astichomyiia latiscapus Girault, 1917

Genus of wasps

Astichomyiia is a genus of hymenopteran insects of the family Eulophidae.
