= Apleurotropis =

Scientific classification
- Domain: Eukaryota
- Kingdom: Animalia
- Phylum: Arthropoda
- Class: Insecta
- Order: Hymenoptera
- Family: Eulophidae
- Subfamily: Entedoninae
- Genus: Apleurotropis; Girault, 1913

Type species
- Apleurotropis viridis Girault, 1913

Species
- 24 species

Genus of wasps

Apleurotropis is a genus of hymenopteran insects of the family Eulophidae that is mostly found in Australia, Japan, and in the Americas, a range from Mexico to Brazil. Hosts are primarily leaf-mining Lepidoptera although one species parasitizes Phytomyza horticola.
