= Epichrysocharis burwelli =

Scientific classification
- Kingdom: Animalia
- Phylum: Arthropoda
- Clade: Pancrustacea
- Class: Insecta
- Order: Hymenoptera
- Family: Eulophidae
- Genus: Epichrysocharis
- Species: E. burwelli

Binomial name
- Epichrysocharis burwelli Schauff, 2000

Species of wasp

Epichrysocharis burwelli, the lemon scent eucalyptus gall wasp, is a species of gall wasp from the family Eulophidae which was first described from California in 2000 but which is thought to have originated in Australia, where its host plant is indigenous. It is now found in many areas of the World where its host plant, the lemon-scented eucalyptus Corymbia citriodora is grown.

== Description ==
Epichrysocharis burwelli is a very small wasp, no longer than 5mm, which is mainly brown with yellow markings on the face, eyes and at the base of the antennae. On the females the ovipositor is half the length of the metasoma.

== Distribution and habitat ==
Epichrysocharis burwelli was first recorded from California where specimens emerged from galls on the leaves of Corymbia citriodora collected in the Los Angeles area, it has subsequently been recorded in Brazil and Portugal where its food plant C. citriodora is also grown. It is thought that the species originated in Australia where C. citriodora is native although there are no records of this species from Australia, the other species of Epichrysocharis are found in Australia.

== Biology ==
Epichrysocharis burwelli larvae create small reddish or brownish galls on both sides of the leaves of Corymbia citriodora, showing no preference for any side of the leaf. Each gall produces a "blister" on either side of the leaf. When the adult emerges it creates a round hole in the centre of the gall. The galls can be quite numerous and more than 40 have been counted on a square centimetre of the surface of a leaf, with a mean density of 7 galls per square centimetre of leaf surface. Adults emerge during the morning, peaking around 9 a.m. and the adults live longer when they have access to high energy food such as nectar. The sex ratio is heavily skewed towards females being as high as 165 females for every male in Brazil. The life cycle takes 75 days rom egg laying to the adult emergence and the galls show five stages of morphological changes, which probably reflect changes in the larvae within. In Brazil the wasps are multivoltine with overlapping generations and adults can be seen all year. Infestation has an economic effect as it reduces the production of oil from commercial plantations of the C. citriodora.

In Portugal an unidentified species of Closterocerus, a genus previously unknown in Europe, has been found as a parasitoid of the larvae of E. burwelli in Portugal.
