= Pleurotropopseus =

Scientific classification
- Kingdom: Animalia
- Phylum: Arthropoda
- Class: Insecta
- Order: Hymenoptera
- Family: Eulophidae
- Subfamily: Entedoninae
- Genus: Pleurotropopseus; Girault, 1913

Species
- Pleurotropopseus purpureus Girault, 1913

Genus of wasps

Pleurotropopseus is a genus of hymenopteran insects of the family Eulophidae.
