= Parzaommomyia =

Scientific classification
- Domain: Eukaryota
- Kingdom: Animalia
- Phylum: Arthropoda
- Class: Insecta
- Order: Hymenoptera
- Family: Eulophidae
- Subfamily: Entedoninae
- Genus: Parzaommomyia; Girault, 1915

Type species
- Parzaommomyia tenuicorpus Girault, 1915

Species
- Parzaommomyia achterbergi Gumovsky and Ubaidillah, 2002; Parzaommomyia africana Gumovsky and Ubaidillah, 2002; Parzaommomyia crassicornis Gumovsky and Ubaidillah, 2002; Parzaommomyia incompleta Gumovsky and Ubaidillah, 2002; Parzaommomyia halavarthyensis Parveen and Zeya, 2023; Parzaommomyia haziqi Parveen and Zeya, 2023; Parzaommomyia malabarica Narendran, 2004; Parzaommomyia sulensis Gumovsky and Ubaidillah, 2002; Parzaommomyia tenuicorpus Girault, 1915

Genus of wasps

Parzaommomyia is a genus of hymenopteran insects of the family Eulophidae.
