= Zaommomyiella =

Scientific classification
- Kingdom: Animalia
- Phylum: Arthropoda
- Class: Insecta
- Order: Hymenoptera
- Family: Eulophidae
- Subfamily: Entedoninae
- Genus: Zaommomyiella; Girault, 1913

Type species
- Zaommomyiella oculata Girault, 1913

Species
- Zaommomyiella abnormis Girault, 1913; Zaommomyiella oculata (Girault, 1913); Zaommomyiella persimilis Girault, 1915; Zaommomyiella saintpierrei Girault, 1913; Zaommomyiella sol Girault, 1915; Zaommomyiella tintinnabulum Girault, 1915

Genus of wasps

Zaommomyiella is a genus of hymenopteran insects of the family Eulophidae.
