= Entedononecremnus =

Scientific classification
- Kingdom: Animalia
- Phylum: Arthropoda
- Class: Insecta
- Order: Hymenoptera
- Family: Eulophidae
- Subfamily: Entedoninae
- Genus: Entedononecremnus; Girault, 1915

Type species
- Entedononecremnus unicus Girault, 1915

Species
- 16 Species

Genus of wasps

Entedononecremnus is a genus of hymenopteran insects of the family Eulophidae.
