= Davincia =

Scientific classification
- Domain: Eukaryota
- Kingdom: Animalia
- Phylum: Arthropoda
- Class: Insecta
- Order: Hymenoptera
- Family: Eulophidae
- Subfamily: Entedoninae
- Genus: Davincia; Girault, 1924

Species
- Davincia arboris Girault, 1924

Genus of wasps

Davincia is a genus of hymenopteran insects of the family Eulophidae. It is named after the Italian painter Leonardo da Vinci.

== See also ==
- List of organisms named after famous people (born before 1800)
