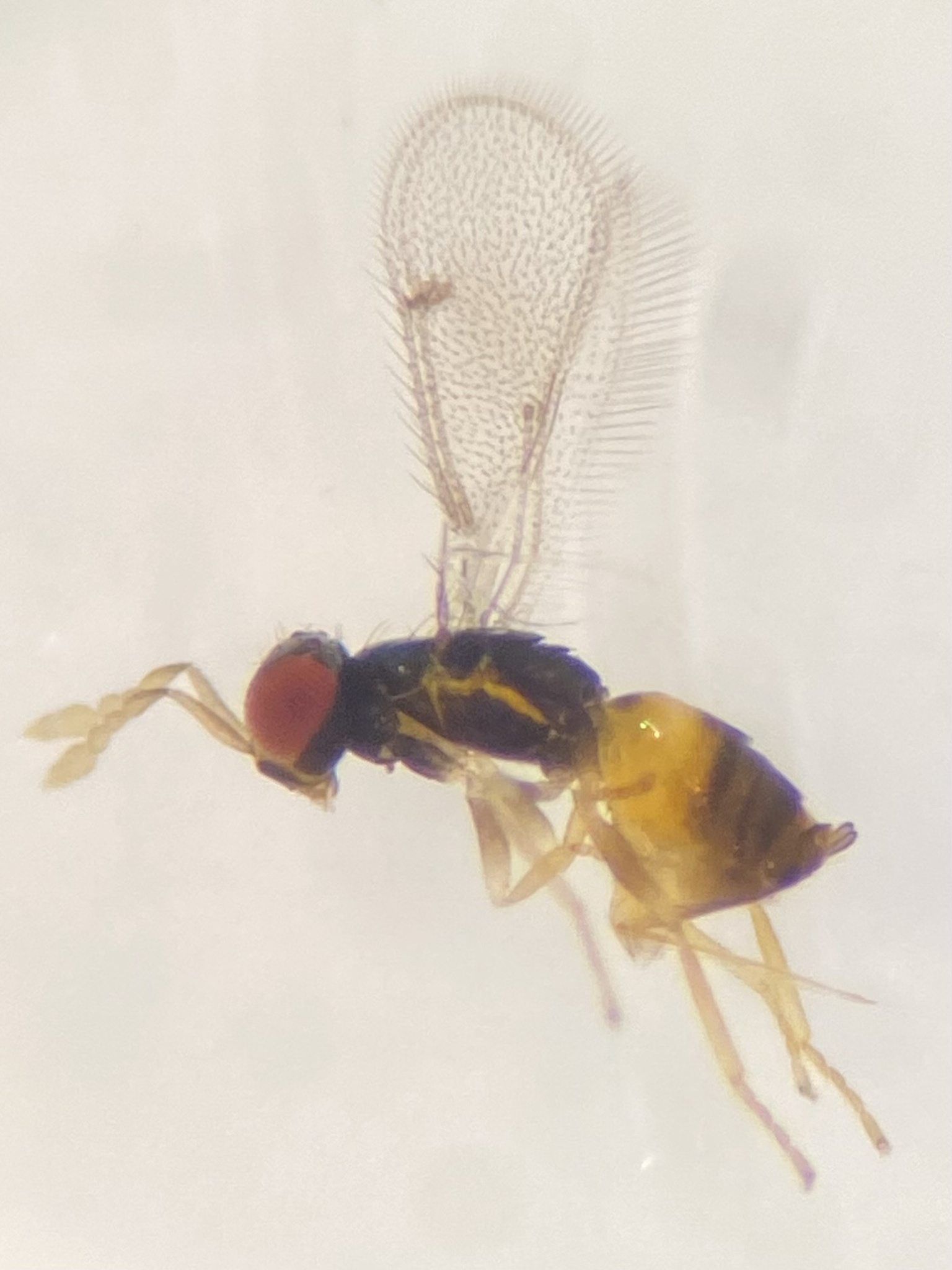
- Ceranisus americensis

Scientific classification
- Kingdom: Animalia
- Phylum: Arthropoda
- Class: Insecta
- Order: Hymenoptera
- Family: Eulophidae
- Subfamily: Entedoninae
- Genus: Ceranisus; Walker, 1842

Type species
- Ceranisus pacuvius (Walker, 1841)

Species
- see Text

Synonyms
- List: Epomphale Girault, 1915; Gaziantepus Doganlar and Doganlar, 2013; Guelsenia Doganlar and Doganlar, 2013; Sergueicus Doganlar and Doganlar, 2013; Thripoctenus Crawford, 1911; Urfacus Doganlar, 2003

= Ceranisus =

Genus of wasps

Ceranisus is a genus of wasps in the family Eulophidae. They are parasitoids of thrips and may be important in their biological control.

== Species ==
The following species are recognised in the genus Ceranisus:

- Ceranisus amanosus Doganlar, Gumovsky and Doganlar, 2009
- Ceranisus americensis (Girault, 1917)
- Ceranisus antalyacus Triapitsyn, 2004
- Ceranisus atcanacus (Doganlar and Doganlar, 2013)
- Ceranisus barsoomensis Triapitsyn, 2005
- Ceranisus bozovaensis (Doganlar, 2003)
- Ceranisus femoratus (Gahan, 1932)
- Ceranisus filizinancae (Doganlar and Doganlar, 2014)
- Ceranisus hirsutus Doganlar and Triapitsyn, 2007
- Ceranisus hoddlei Triapitsyn & Morse, 2005
- Ceranisus jabanitarlensis Doganlar, Gumovsky and Doganlar, 2011
- Ceranisus javae (Girault, 1917)
- Ceranisus karacadagi (Doganlar and Doganlar, 2013)
- Ceranisus karkamisus (Doganlar and Doganlar, 2013)
- Ceranisus kemalae (Doganlar and Doganlar, 2014)
- Ceranisus kirimensis (Doganlar and Doganlar, 2014)
- Ceranisus kocaki (Doganlar and Doganlar, 2014)
- Ceranisus komurcukurus (Doganlar and Doganlar, 2013)
- Ceranisus lepidotus Graham, 1963
- Ceranisus loomansi Triapitsyn and Headrick, 1995
- Ceranisus menes (Walker, 1839)
- Ceranisus nigricornis Motschulsky, 1863
- Ceranisus nigrifemora De Santis, 1961
- Ceranisus nizipus (Doganlar and Doganlar, 2013)
- Ceranisus oezdikmeni (Doganlar and Doganlar, 2014)
- Ceranisus oguzeliensis (Doganlar and Doganlar, 2013)
- Ceranisus onuri Doganlar, 2010
- Ceranisus pacuvius (Walker, 1838)
- Ceranisus planitianus Erdös, 1966
- Ceranisus rubensteina (Girault, 1934)
- Ceranisus russelli (Crawford, 1911)
- Ceranisus sekilinensis (Doganlar and Doganlar, 2013)
- Ceranisus semitestaceus Motschulsky, 1863
- Ceranisus sincanus (Doganlar and Doganlar, 2013)
- Ceranisus udnamtak Triapitsyn, 2005
- Ceranisus ukrainensis Doganlar, Gumovsky and Doganlar, 2011
- Ceranisus votetoda Triapitsyn, 2005
