= Epichrysoatomus =

Scientific classification
- Kingdom: Animalia
- Phylum: Arthropoda
- Class: Insecta
- Order: Hymenoptera
- Family: Eulophidae
- Subfamily: Entedoninae
- Genus: Epichrysoatomus; Girault, 1916

Species
- Epichrysoatomus unfasciatipennis Girault, 1916

Genus of wasps

Epichrysoatomus is a genus of hymenopteran insects of the family Eulophidae.
