= Proacrias =

Scientific classification
- Domain: Eukaryota
- Kingdom: Animalia
- Phylum: Arthropoda
- Class: Insecta
- Order: Hymenoptera
- Family: Eulophidae
- Subfamily: Entedoninae
- Genus: Proacrias; R. von Ihering, 1914

Type species
- Proacrias coffeae Ihering, 1914

Species
- Proacrias coffeae Ihering, 1914; Proacrias lividiceps (Ashmead, 1894); Proacrias testaceipes (Crawford, 1914); Proacrias thysanoides (De Santis, 1972); Proacrias ufens (Walker, 1843); Proacrias xenodice (Walker, 1842)

Synonyms
- Didymotropis De Santis, 1964; Eupleurotropis Girault, 1917

Genus of wasps

Proacrias is a genus of hymenopteran insects of the family Eulophidae.
