= Rhynchentedon =

Scientific classification
- Kingdom: Animalia
- Phylum: Arthropoda
- Class: Insecta
- Order: Hymenoptera
- Family: Eulophidae
- Subfamily: Entedoninae
- Genus: Rhynchentedon; Girault, 1919

Type species
- Rhynchentedon maximus Girault, 1919

Species
- Rhynchentedon achterbergi Gumovsky, 2001; Rhynchentedon maximus Girault, 1919; Rhynchentedon narendrani Gumovsky, 2004

Genus of wasps

Rhynchentedon is a genus of hymenopteran insects of the family Eulophidae.
