= Encyrtomphale =

Scientific classification
- Kingdom: Animalia
- Phylum: Arthropoda
- Class: Insecta
- Order: Hymenoptera
- Family: Eulophidae
- Subfamily: Entedoninae
- Genus: Encyrtomphale; Girault, 1915

Species
- Encyrtomphale parvulicorpus Girault, 1915

Genus of wasps

Encyrtomphale is a genus of hymenopteran insects of the family Eulophidae.
