= Pediobomyia =

Scientific classification
- Kingdom: Animalia
- Phylum: Arthropoda
- Class: Insecta
- Order: Hymenoptera
- Family: Eulophidae
- Subfamily: Entedoninae
- Genus: Pediobomyia; Girault, 1913

Type species
- Pediobomyia darwini Girault, 1913

Species
- Pediobomyia brevicaulis Hansson, 2002; Pediobomyia budaicus Narendran, 2007; Pediobomyia canaliculata Hansson, 2002; Pediobomyia darwini Girault, 1913; Pediobomyia frontus (Narendran, 2004); Pediobomyia lankicus Narendran, 2007

Synonyms
- Bombyiabius Narendran, 2004

Genus of wasps

Pediobomyia is a genus of hymenopteran insects of the family Eulophidae.
