= Parahorismenus =

Scientific classification
- Domain: Eukaryota
- Kingdom: Animalia
- Phylum: Arthropoda
- Class: Insecta
- Order: Hymenoptera
- Family: Eulophidae
- Subfamily: Entedoninae
- Genus: Parahorismenus; Girault, 1915

Type species
- Parahorismenus spissipunctatus Girault, 1915

Species
- Parahorismenus cornelli Kamijo, 1990; Parahorismenus infuscatipennis (Shafee, Fatma, Khan and Shujauddin, 1984); Parahorismenus pondicherryensis (Shafee and Rizvi, 1985); Parahorismenus spissipunctatus Girault, 1915

Genus of wasps

Parahorismenus is a genus of hymenopteran insects of the family Eulophidae.
