= Grahamia =

Grahamia may refer to:

- Grahamia (fly) Theobold, 1909, a genus of flies in the family Culicidae
- Grahamia (wasp) Erdös, 1966, a genus of wasps in the family Eulophidae
- Grahamia (plant), a genus of plants in the family Anacampserotaceae
