= Alachua =

Alachua may refer to:

- Alachua County, Florida, United States
- Alachua, Florida, a city in Alachua County, Florida
- Alachua culture, the archaeological designation of the Native American culture in north-central Florida, c. AD 700 to 1700
- Alachua Formation, a geological formation in Florida
- Alachua, a former genus of wasps in the family Eulophidae, presently a junior synonym of Horismenus
