= Itahipeus =

Scientific classification
- Domain: Eukaryota
- Kingdom: Animalia
- Phylum: Arthropoda
- Class: Insecta
- Order: Hymenoptera
- Family: Eulophidae
- Subfamily: Entedoninae
- Genus: Itahipeus; Hansson & LaSalle, 2003

Type species
- Itahipeus brasilicola Hansson & LaSalle, 2003

Species
- Itahipeus brasilicola Hansson & LaSalle, 2003; Itahipeus euryceps Hansson & LaSalle, 2003

Genus of wasps

Itahipeus is a genus of hymenopteran insects of the family Eulophidae.
