= Xiphentedon =

Scientific classification
- Kingdom: Animalia
- Phylum: Arthropoda
- Class: Insecta
- Order: Hymenoptera
- Family: Eulophidae
- Subfamily: Entedoninae
- Genus: Xiphentedon; Risbec, 1957

Species
- Xiphentedon kayovei Risbec, 1957

Genus of wasps

Xiphentedon is a genus of hymenopteran insects of the family Eulophidae.
