= Dasyomphale =

Scientific classification
- Domain: Eukaryota
- Kingdom: Animalia
- Phylum: Arthropoda
- Class: Insecta
- Order: Hymenoptera
- Family: Eulophidae
- Subfamily: Entedoninae
- Genus: Dasyomphale; LaSalle and Schauff, 1994

Species
- Dasyomphale chilensis LaSalle and Schauff, 1994

Genus of wasps

Dasyomphale is a genus of hymenopteran insects of the family Eulophidae.
