= Obesulus =

Scientific classification
- Kingdom: Animalia
- Phylum: Arthropoda
- Class: Insecta
- Order: Hymenoptera
- Family: Eulophidae
- Subfamily: Entedoninae
- Genus: Obesulus; Boucek, 1988

Type species
- Obesulus ater Boucek, 1988

Species
- Obesulus ater Boucek, 1988; Obesulus indicus Sushil and Khan, 1999; Obesulus keralicus Narendran and Girish Kumar, 2005

Genus of wasps

Obesulus is a genus of hymenopteran insects of the family Eulophidae.
