= Pelorotelus =

Scientific classification
- Kingdom: Animalia
- Phylum: Arthropoda
- Class: Insecta
- Order: Hymenoptera
- Family: Eulophidae
- Subfamily: Entedoninae
- Genus: Pelorotelus; Ashmead, 1904

Type species
- Pelorotelus coerulens Ashmead, 1904

Species
- Pelorotelus coerulens Ashmead, 1904; Pelorotelus macilentus De Santis, 1988

Genus of wasps

Pelorotelus is a genus of hymenopteran insects of the family Eulophidae.
