= Neopediobopsis =

Scientific classification
- Domain: Eukaryota
- Kingdom: Animalia
- Phylum: Arthropoda
- Class: Insecta
- Order: Hymenoptera
- Family: Eulophidae
- Subfamily: Entedoninae
- Genus: Neopediobopsis; Narendran, 1994

Species
- Neopediobopsis setosa Narendran, 1994

Genus of wasps

Neopediobopsis is a genus of hymenopteran insects of the family Eulophidae.
