= Microdonophagus =

Scientific classification
- Domain: Eukaryota
- Kingdom: Animalia
- Phylum: Arthropoda
- Class: Insecta
- Order: Hymenoptera
- Family: Eulophidae
- Subfamily: Entedoninae
- Genus: Microdonophagus; Schauff, 1986

Type species
- Microdonophagus woodleyi Schauff, 1986

Species
- Microdonophagus levis Hansson, 2009; Microdonophagus tertius Hansson, 2011; Microdonophagus woodleyi Schauff, 1986

Genus of wasps

Microdonophagus is a genus of hymenopteran insects of the family Eulophidae.
