= Paracrias =

Scientific classification
- Domain: Eukaryota
- Kingdom: Animalia
- Phylum: Arthropoda
- Class: Insecta
- Order: Hymenoptera
- Family: Eulophidae
- Subfamily: Entedoninae
- Genus: Paracrias; Ashmead, 1904

Type species
- Paracrias laticeps Ashmead, 1904

Species
- 66 species

Genus of wasps

Paracrias is a genus of hymenopteran insects of the family Eulophidae. Larvae are gregarious parasitoids of Curculionoidea, with P. huberi being a parasitoid of H. analis.
