= Sarasvatia =

Scientific classification
- Kingdom: Animalia
- Phylum: Arthropoda
- Class: Insecta
- Order: Hymenoptera
- Family: Eulophidae
- Subfamily: Entedoninae
- Genus: Sarasvatia; Hedqvist, 1976

Species
- Sarasvatia srilankiensis Hedqvist, 1976

Genus of wasps

Sarasvatia is a genus of hymenopteran insects of the family Eulophidae.
