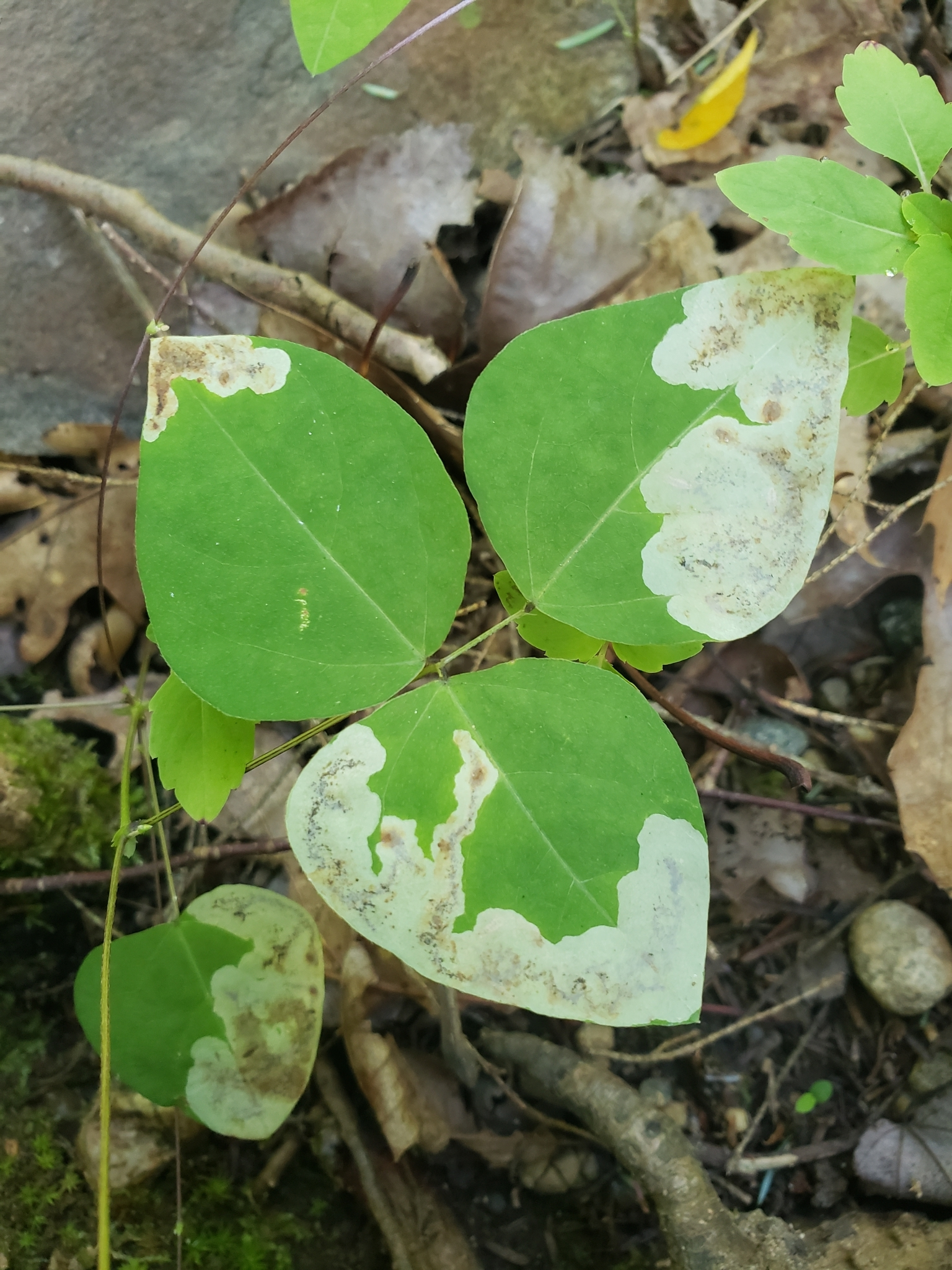
- Damage caused by Leucanthiza amphicarpeaefoliella

Scientific classification
- Kingdom: Animalia
- Phylum: Arthropoda
- Class: Insecta
- Order: Lepidoptera
- Family: Gracillariidae
- Genus: Leucanthiza
- Species: L. amphicarpeaefoliella

Binomial name
- Leucanthiza amphicarpeaefoliella Clemens, 1859

Synonyms
- Leucanthiza amphicarpeifoliella Meyrick, 1912; Leucanthiza saundersella Chambers, 1871

= Leucanthiza amphicarpeaefoliella =

Species of moth

Leucanthiza amphicarpeaefoliella is a species of moth in the family Gracillariidae. It is known from Ontario and Québec in Canada, and Kentucky, Connecticut, Maryland, Pennsylvania, Vermont, and Illinois in the United States.

The wingspan is about 8 mm.

The larvae feed on Amphicarpaea bracteata. They mine the leaves of their host plant.
