= Ametallon =

Scientific classification
- Domain: Eukaryota
- Kingdom: Animalia
- Phylum: Arthropoda
- Class: Insecta
- Order: Hymenoptera
- Family: Eulophidae
- Subfamily: Entedoninae
- Genus: Ametallon; Ashmead, 1904

Type species
- Ametallon chapadae Ashmead, 1904

Species
- 27 species

Genus of wasps

Ametallon is a genus of hymenopteran insects of the family Eulophidae.
