= Myrmokata =

Scientific classification
- Domain: Eukaryota
- Kingdom: Animalia
- Phylum: Arthropoda
- Class: Insecta
- Order: Hymenoptera
- Family: Eulophidae
- Subfamily: Entedoninae
- Genus: Myrmokata; Boucek, 1972

Species
- Myrmokata diparoides Boucek, 1972

Genus of wasps

Myrmokata is a genus of hymenopteran insects of the family Eulophidae.
