= Uroderostenus =

Scientific classification
- Kingdom: Animalia
- Phylum: Arthropoda
- Class: Insecta
- Order: Hymenoptera
- Family: Eulophidae
- Subfamily: Entedoninae
- Genus: Uroderostenus; Ashmead, 1904

Species
- Uroderostenus pleuralis Ashmead, 1904

Genus of wasps

Uroderostenus is a genus of hymenopteran insects of the family Eulophidae.
