= Cabeza (wasp) =

Scientific classification
- Domain: Eukaryota
- Kingdom: Animalia
- Phylum: Arthropoda
- Class: Insecta
- Order: Hymenoptera
- Family: Eulophidae
- Subfamily: Entedoninae
- Genus: Cabeza; Hansson & LaSalle, 2003

Type species
- Cabeza petiolate Hansson & LaSalle, 2003

Species
- Cabeza baeostigma Hansson & LaSalle, 2003; Cabeza canaliculata Hansson & LaSalle, 2003; Cabeza laticeps Hansson & LaSalle, 2003; Cabeza petiolate Hansson & LaSalle, 2003; Cabeza planiscapus Hansson & LaSalle, 2003; Cabeza ugaldei Hansson & LaSalle, 2003

Genus of wasps

Cabeza is a Neotropical genus of hymenopteran insects of the family Eulophidae.
