= Dinopteridion =

Scientific classification
- Domain: Eukaryota
- Kingdom: Animalia
- Phylum: Arthropoda
- Class: Insecta
- Order: Hymenoptera
- Family: Eulophidae
- Subfamily: Entedoninae
- Genus: Dinopteridion; Hansson, 2004

Type species
- Dinopteridion turbinis Hansson, 2004

Species
- Dinopteridion corcovadoense Hansson, 2004; Dinopteridion gigas Hansson, 2004; Dinopteridion gouleti Hansson, 2004; Dinopteridion languidiceps Hansson, 2004; Dinopteridion turbinis Hansson, 2004

Genus of wasps

Dinopteridion is a genus of hymenopteran insects of the family Eulophidae.
