= Tanava =

Scientific classification
- Domain: Eukaryota
- Kingdom: Animalia
- Phylum: Arthropoda
- Class: Insecta
- Order: Hymenoptera
- Family: Eulophidae
- Subfamily: Entedoninae
- Genus: Tanava; Brèthes, 1918

Species
- Tanava rospigliosii Brèthes, 1918

Genus of wasps

Tanava is a genus of hymenopteran insects of the family Eulophidae.
