= Tropicharis =

Scientific classification
- Domain: Eukaryota
- Kingdom: Animalia
- Phylum: Arthropoda
- Class: Insecta
- Order: Hymenoptera
- Family: Eulophidae
- Subfamily: Entedoninae
- Genus: Tropicharis; Hansson, 1998

Species
- Tropicharis cecivora Hansson, 1998

Genus of wasps

Tropicharis is a genus of hymenopteran insects of the family Eulophidae.
