= Leucanthiza =

Scientific classification
- Kingdom: Animalia
- Phylum: Arthropoda
- Clade: Pancrustacea
- Class: Insecta
- Order: Lepidoptera
- Family: Gracillariidae
- Subfamily: Lithocolletinae
- Genus: Leucanthiza; Clemens, 1859

Species
- See text

Genus of moths

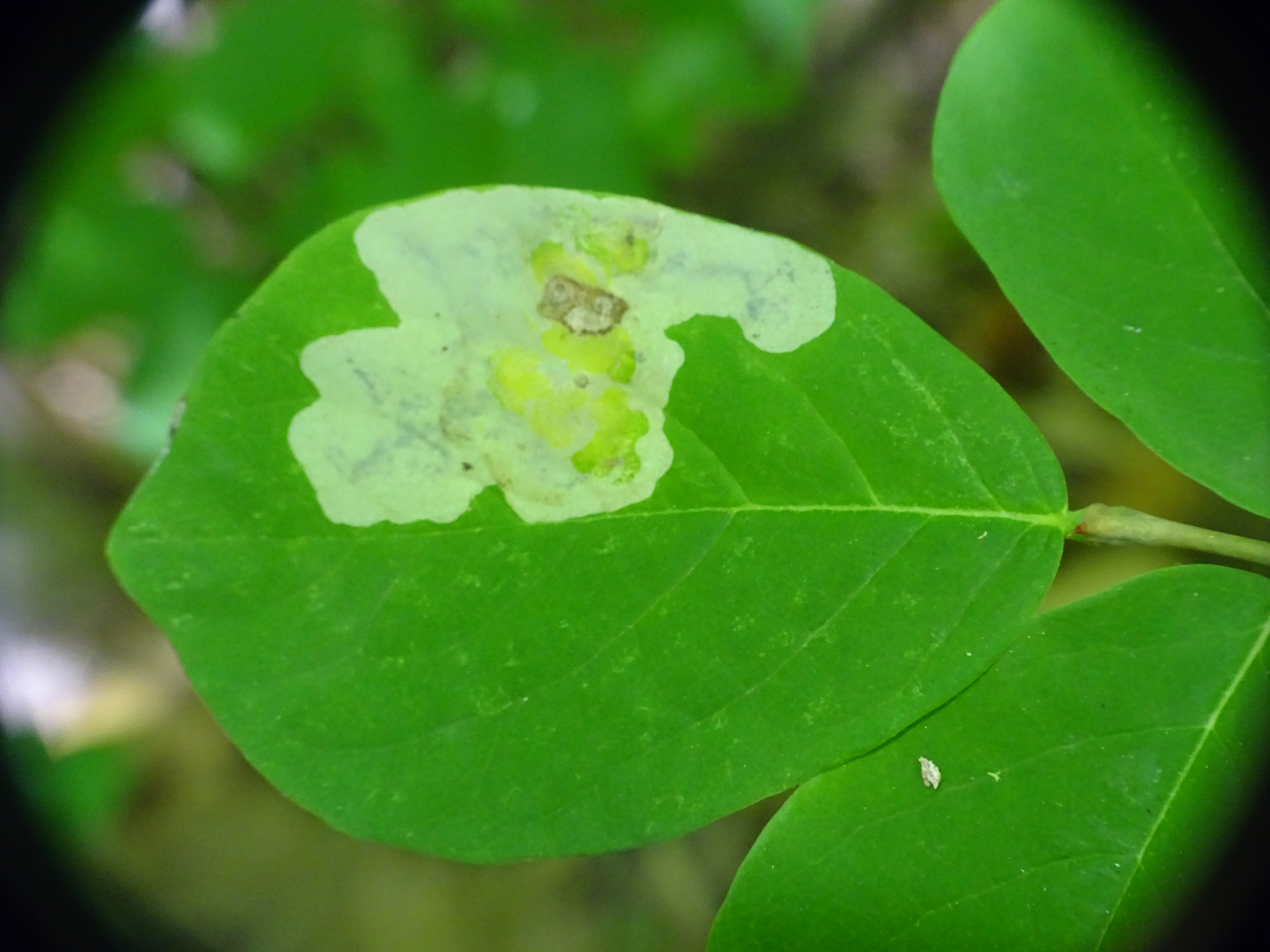
Leafmine of Leucanthiza dircella in Dirca palustris

Leucanthiza is a genus of moths in the family Gracillariidae.

== Species ==
- Leucanthiza amphicarpeaefoliella Clemens, 1859
- Leucanthiza dircella Braun, 1914
- Leucanthiza forbesi Bourquin, 1962
