= Shardiella =

Scientific classification
- Kingdom: Animalia
- Phylum: Arthropoda
- Class: Insecta
- Order: Hymenoptera
- Family: Eulophidae
- Subfamily: Entedoninae
- Genus: Shardiella; Sushil and Khan, 1997

Species
- Shardiella savitri Sushil and Khan, 1997

Genus of wasps

Shardiella is a genus of hymenopteran insects of the family Eulophidae.
