= Kokandia =

Scientific classification
- Domain: Eukaryota
- Kingdom: Animalia
- Phylum: Arthropoda
- Class: Insecta
- Order: Hymenoptera
- Family: Eulophidae
- Subfamily: Entedoninae
- Genus: Kokandia; Yefremova & Kriskovich, 1995

Species
- Kokandia salsolicola Efremova & Kriskovich, 1995

Genus of wasps

Kokandia is a monotypic genus of hymenopteran insects of the family Eulophidae. The only known species Kokandia salsolicola is a parasitoid of gall midges belonging to the family Cecidomyiidae which use plants of the goosefoot genus Salsola as hosts.
