= Dentalion =

Scientific classification
- Domain: Eukaryota
- Kingdom: Animalia
- Phylum: Arthropoda
- Class: Insecta
- Order: Hymenoptera
- Family: Eulophidae
- Subfamily: Entedoninae
- Genus: Dentalion; Hansson, 2011

Type species
- Dentalion pinguicornis Hansson, 2011

Species
- See text

Genus of wasps

Dentalion is a genus of Neotropical hymenopteran insects of the family Eulophidae.

== Species ==
- Dentalion alveum Hansson, 2011
- Dentalion ambonatum Hansson, 2011
- Dentalion apertum Hansson, 2011
- Dentalion apon Hansson, 2011
- Dentalion crassicornis Hansson, 2011
- Dentalion jimenezi Hansson, 2011
- Dentalion mischum Hansson, 2011
- Dentalion noyesi Hansson, 2011
- Dentalion pinguicornis Hansson, 2011
- Dentalion pnigaliae Hansson, 2011
- Dentalion quadrifer Hansson, 2011
