= Perditorulus =

Scientific classification
- Kingdom: Animalia
- Phylum: Arthropoda
- Class: Insecta
- Order: Hymenoptera
- Family: Eulophidae
- Subfamily: Entedoninae
- Genus: Perditorulus; Hansson, 1986

Type species
- Perditorulus penicillatus Hansson, 1986

Species
- 85 species

Genus of wasps

Perditorulus is a genus of hymenopteran insects of the family Eulophidae.
