= Chrysocharodes =

Scientific classification
- Domain: Eukaryota
- Kingdom: Animalia
- Phylum: Arthropoda
- Class: Insecta
- Order: Hymenoptera
- Family: Eulophidae
- Subfamily: Entedoninae
- Genus: Chrysocharodes; Ashmead, 1894

Type species
- Chrysocharodes petiolate Ashmead, 1894

Species
- Chrysocharodes lasallei Schauff, 1998; Chrysocharodes petiolate Ashmead, 1894; Chrysocharodes rotundiventris De Santis, 1990

Genus of wasps

Chrysocharodes is a genus of hymenopteran insects of the family Eulophidae.
