= Clypecharis =

Scientific classification
- Domain: Eukaryota
- Kingdom: Animalia
- Phylum: Arthropoda
- Class: Insecta
- Order: Hymenoptera
- Family: Eulophidae
- Subfamily: Entedoninae
- Genus: Clypecharis; Gumovsky, 2003

Species
- Clypecharis rostrifera Gumovsky, 2003

Genus of wasps

Clypecharis is a genus of hymenopteran insects of the family Eulophidae.
