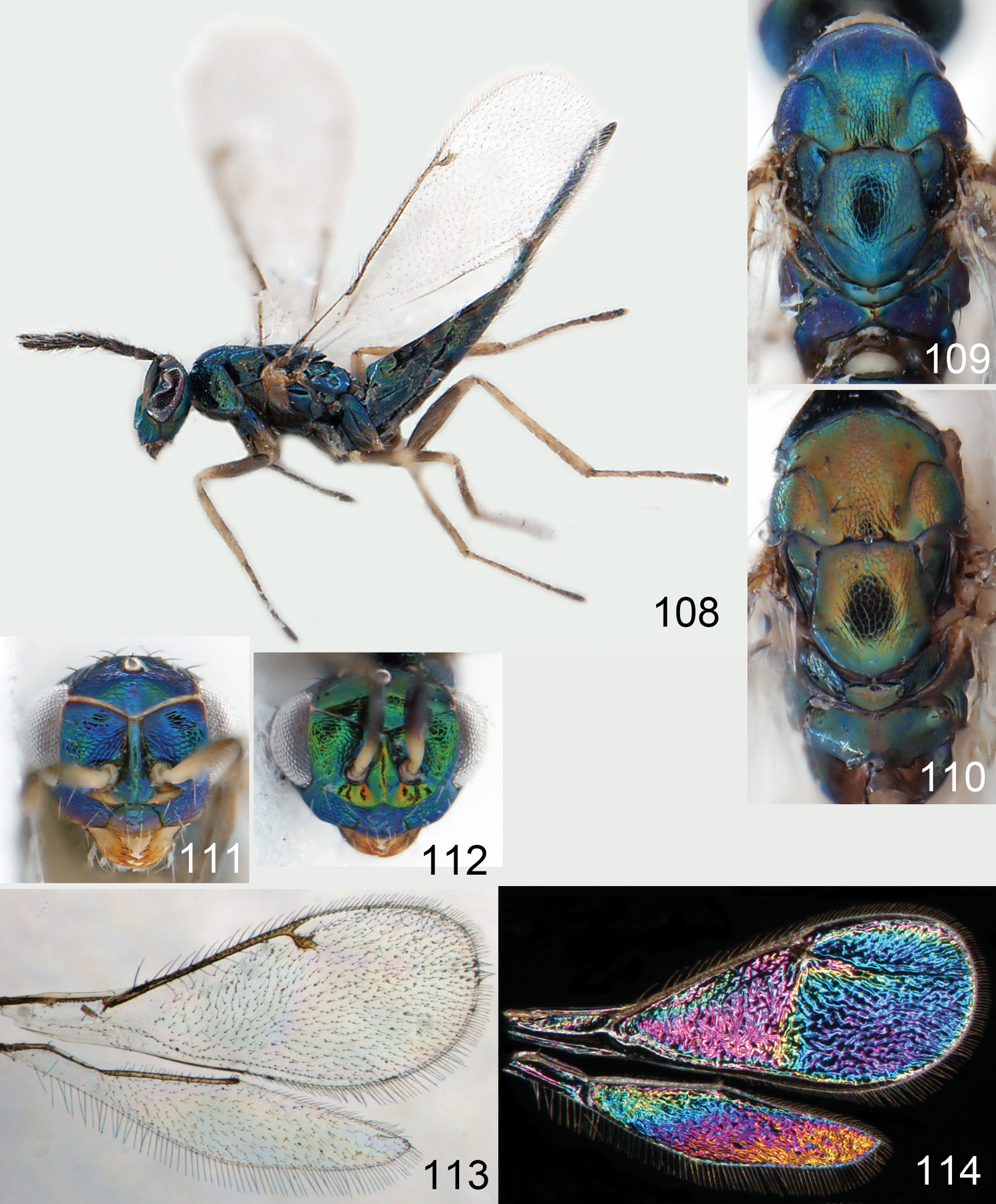

Scientific classification
- Domain: Eukaryota
- Kingdom: Animalia
- Phylum: Arthropoda
- Class: Insecta
- Order: Hymenoptera
- Family: Eulophidae
- Genus: Omphale
- Species: O. salicis

Binomial name
- Omphale salicis (Haliday, 1833)

Synonyms
- Entedon (Omphale) salicis Haliday, 1833; Derostenus (Omphale) salici (Haliday, 1833); Entedon salicis (Haliday, 1833); Eulophus subulatus Nees, 1834; Eulophus terebrator Förster, 1841

= Omphale salicis =

Species of wasp

Omphale salicis is a species of wasp in the family Eulophidae. It is known from Europe and Canada.

The body length is 1–1.7 mm (0.039–0.067 in) in males and 1.4–3.1 mm (0.055–0.122 in) in females. It is a parasitoid of gall midges (Cecidomyiidae) of the genus Contarinia: Contarinia loti, Contarinia vincetoxici, and probably Contarinia lentis.
