= Colpixys =

Scientific classification
- Kingdom: Animalia
- Phylum: Arthropoda
- Clade: Pancrustacea
- Class: Insecta
- Order: Hymenoptera
- Family: Eulophidae
- Subfamily: Entedoninae
- Genus: Colpixys; Waterston, 1916

Type species
- Colpixys necator Waterston, 1916

Species
- Colpixys gigas Boucek, 1972; Colpixys eburnus; Colpixys necator Waterston, 1916; Colpixys robusta Ishii, 1942

Genus of wasps

Colpixys is a genus of hymenopteran insects of the family Eulophidae.
