= Aulogymnus arsames =

Scientific classification
- Kingdom: Animalia
- Phylum: Arthropoda
- Clade: Pancrustacea
- Class: Insecta
- Order: Hymenoptera
- Family: Eulophidae
- Genus: Aulogymnus
- Species: A. arsames

Binomial name
- Aulogymnus arsames Walker, 1838

Synonyms
- Cirrospilus arsames Walker, 1838; Olynx arsames Walker, 1838; Aulogymnus lineaticeps Mayr, 1877; Olinx lineaticeps Mayr, 1877; Olynx lineaticeps Mayr, 1877

Species of insect

Aulogymnus arsames is a species of insect from the Eulophidae family. It was originally described as Cirrospilus arsames by Francis Walker in 1838.

== Etymology ==
A. arsames derived its specific epithet from the name "Arsames", a Persian name shared by multiple rulers (including Arsames, Arsames I, and Arsames (satrap of Egypt).) This name and the etymology behind it have no relation to the wasp itself, and is likely a result of Walker's general carelessness when it came to his profession.

== Distribution ==
The species is found in Finland, The United Kingdom, Sweden, Spain, The Aland Islands, and Norway.
