= Bridarolliella =

Scientific classification
- Domain: Eukaryota
- Kingdom: Animalia
- Phylum: Arthropoda
- Class: Insecta
- Order: Hymenoptera
- Family: Eulophidae
- Subfamily: Entedoninae
- Genus: Bridarolliella de Santis, 1949

Species
- Bridarolliella bifasciata De Santis, 1949

Genus of wasps

Bridarolliella is a genus of hymenopteran insects of the family Eulophidae.
