= Monteithius =

Scientific classification
- Domain: Eukaryota
- Kingdom: Animalia
- Phylum: Arthropoda
- Class: Insecta
- Order: Hymenoptera
- Family: Eulophidae
- Subfamily: Entedoninae
- Genus: Monteithius; Boucek, 1988

Species
- Monteithius varius Boucek, 1988

Genus of wasps

Monteithius is a genus of hymenopteran insects of the family Eulophidae.
