= Omphale (wasp) =

- Omphale matrana

Scientific classification
- Kingdom: Animalia
- Phylum: Arthropoda
- Class: Insecta
- Order: Hymenoptera
- Family: Eulophidae
- Subfamily: Entedoninae
- Genus: Omphale; Haliday, 1833

Type species
- Omphale salicis (Haliday, 1833)

Species
- At least 271 species

Genus of wasps

Omphale is a genus of hymenopteran insects of the family Eulophidae. It has cosmopolitan distribution. They are parasitoids of gall midges (Cecidomyiidae).

== Species ==
There are at least 271 species, including:

- Omphale cornula Hansson & Shevtsova, 2012
- Omphale salicis (Haliday, 1833)
