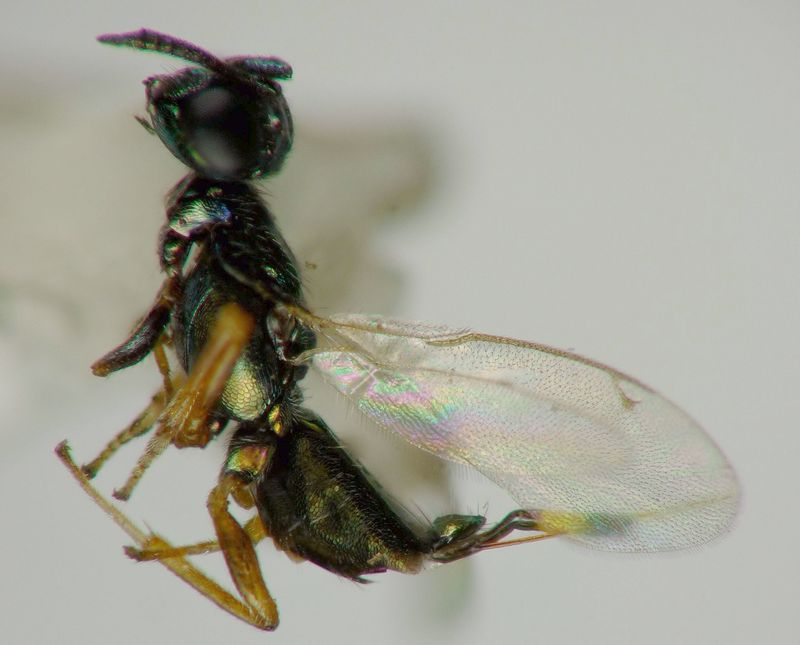

Scientific classification
- Kingdom: Animalia
- Phylum: Arthropoda
- Class: Insecta
- Order: Hymenoptera
- Family: Eulophidae
- Subfamily: Entedoninae
- Genus: Neochrysocharis; Kurdjumov, 1912

Type species
- Neochrysocharis pictipes (Crawford, 1912)

Species
- 51 species

= Neochrysocharis =

Genus of wasps

Neochrysocharis is a genus of hymenopteran insects of the family Eulophidae. They are endoparasitoids of leafminers.
