= Grassator =

Scientific classification
- Domain: Eukaryota
- Kingdom: Animalia
- Phylum: Arthropoda
- Class: Insecta
- Order: Hymenoptera
- Family: Eulophidae
- Subfamily: Entedoninae
- Genus: Grassator; De Santis, 1948

Species
- Grassator viator De Santis, 1948

Genus of wasps

Grassator is a genus of hymenopteran insects of the family Eulophidae.
