= Neotrichoporoides beyarslani =

Scientific classification
- Kingdom: Animalia
- Phylum: Arthropoda
- Class: Insecta
- Order: Hymenoptera
- Family: Eulophidae
- Genus: Neotrichoporoides
- Species: N. beyarslani

Binomial name
- Neotrichoporoides beyarslani Doganlar, 1993

Species of wasp

Neotrichoporoides beyarslani is a species of wasp in the Eulophidae family, native to Turkey. The scientific name of this species was first published by Doganlar in 1993.
