= Schizocharis =

Scientific classification
- Kingdom: Animalia
- Phylum: Arthropoda
- Class: Insecta
- Order: Hymenoptera
- Family: Eulophidae
- Subfamily: Entedoninae
- Genus: Schizocharis; Kerrich, 1969

Type species
- Schizocharis combretae (Risbec, 1951)

Species
- Schizocharis amanuensis Kerrich, 1969; Schizocharis combretae (Risbec, 1951)

Genus of wasps

Schizocharis is a genus of hymenopteran insects of the family Eulophidae.
