= Leucanthiza forbesi =

Scientific classification
- Kingdom: Animalia
- Phylum: Arthropoda
- Class: Insecta
- Order: Lepidoptera
- Family: Gracillariidae
- Genus: Leucanthiza
- Species: L. forbesi

Binomial name
- Leucanthiza forbesi Bourquin, 1962

Species of moth

Leucanthiza forbesi is a moth of the family Gracillariidae. It is known from Argentina.

The larvae feed on Dichondra repens. They are thought to mine the leaves of their host plant.
