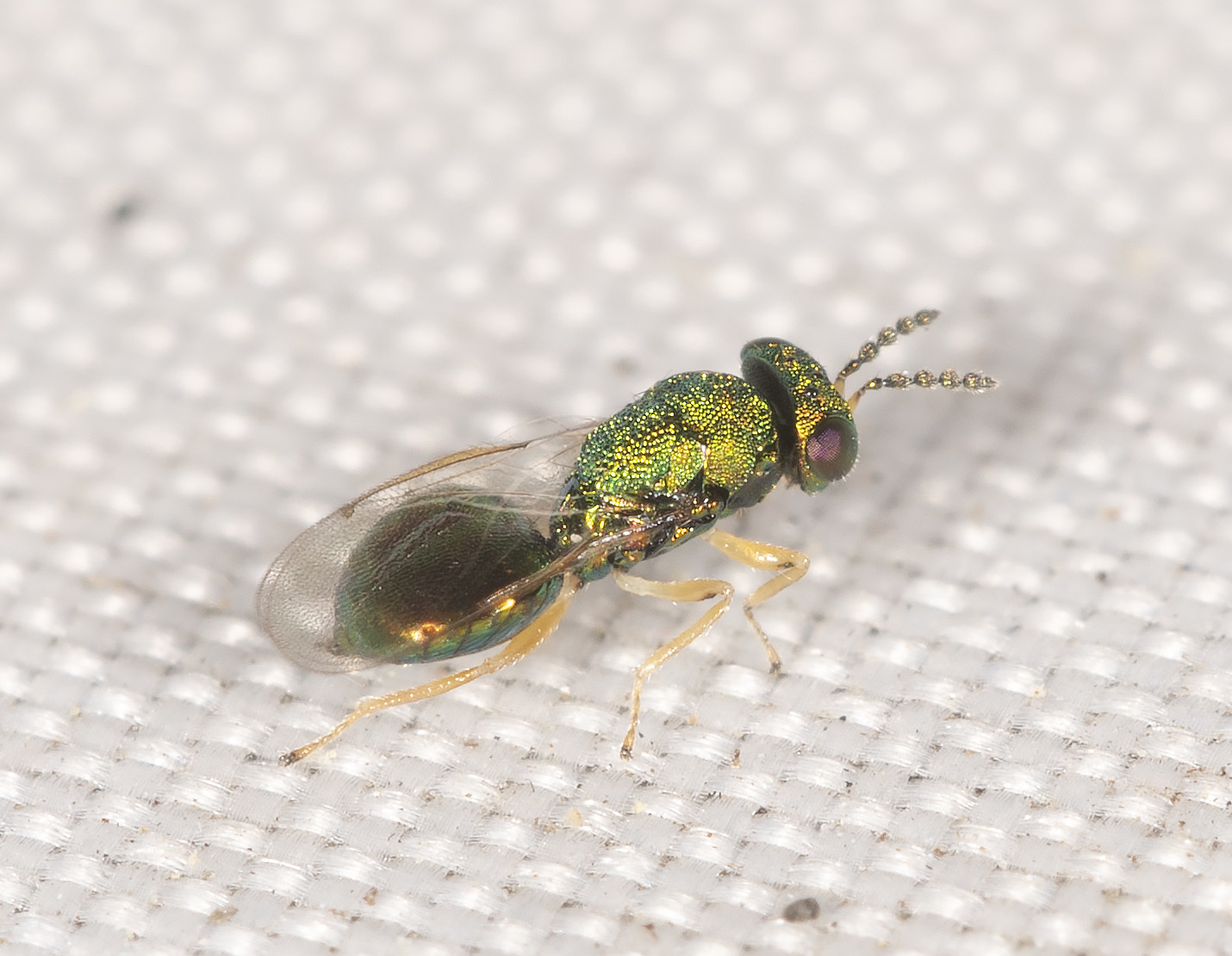
- Entedon magnificus

Scientific classification
- Kingdom: Animalia
- Phylum: Arthropoda
- Class: Insecta
- Order: Hymenoptera
- Family: Eulophidae
- Subfamily: Entedoninae
- Genus: Entedon; Dalman, 1820

Type species
- Entedon cyanellus Dalman, 1820

Species
- 159 species

= Entedon =

Genus of wasps

Entedon is a genus of hymenopteran insects of the family Eulophidae.
