= Monterrondo =

Scientific classification
- Kingdom: Animalia
- Phylum: Arthropoda
- Clade: Pancrustacea
- Class: Insecta
- Order: Hymenoptera
- Family: Eulophidae
- Subfamily: Entedoninae
- Genus: Monterrondo; Hansson and LaSalle, 2003

Species
- Monterrondo aphelosoma Hansson and LaSalle, 2003

Genus of wasps

Monterrondo is a genus of hymenopteran insects of the family Eulophidae.
