= Dubeyiella =

Scientific classification
- Domain: Eukaryota
- Kingdom: Animalia
- Phylum: Arthropoda
- Class: Insecta
- Order: Hymenoptera
- Family: Eulophidae
- Subfamily: Entedoninae
- Genus: Dubeyiella; Khan, Agnohitri and Sushil, 2005

Species
- Dubeyiella indica Khan, Agnohitri and Sushil, 2005

Genus of wasps

Dubeyiella is a genus of hymenopteran insects of the family Eulophidae.
