= Paphagus =

Scientific classification
- Kingdom: Animalia
- Phylum: Arthropoda
- Class: Insecta
- Order: Hymenoptera
- Family: Eulophidae
- Subfamily: Entedoninae
- Genus: Paphagus; Walker, 1843

Type species
- Paphagus sidero Walker, 1843

Species
- Paphagus rugosus Provancher, 1881 (unavailable name in current taxon); Paphagus sidero Walker, 1843

Genus of wasps

Paphagus is a genus of hymenopteran insects of the family Eulophidae.
