= Derostenus =

Scientific classification
- Domain: Eukaryota
- Kingdom: Animalia
- Phylum: Arthropoda
- Class: Insecta
- Order: Hymenoptera
- Family: Eulophidae
- Subfamily: Entedoninae
- Genus: Derostenus; Westwood, 1833

Type species
- Derostenus gemmeus Westwood, 1833

Species
- Derostenus albipes Zehntner, 1898; Derostenus alcetas Walker, 1843; Derostenus antiopae (Packard, 1881); Derostenus freemani Yoshimoto, 1973; Derostenus gemmeus Westwood, 1833; Derostenus japonicus Hansson, 1986; Derostenus leucopus Ashmead, 1888; Derostenus persicus Gumovsky, 2003; Derostenus punctiscuta Thomson, 1878; Derostenus sulciscuta Hansson, 1986; Derostenus trjapitzini Gumovsky, 2003

Genus of wasps

Derostenus is a genus of hymenopteran insects of the family Eulophidae.
