= Pomphale =

Scientific classification
- Domain: Eukaryota
- Kingdom: Animalia
- Phylum: Arthropoda
- Class: Insecta
- Order: Hymenoptera
- Family: Eulophidae
- Subfamily: Entedoninae
- Genus: Pomphale; Husain, Rauf and Kudeshia, 1983

Type species
- Pomphale striptipennis Husain, Rauf and Kudeshia, 1983

Species
- Pomphale setosipennis Hayat and Zeya, 1992; Pomphale striptipennis Husain, Rauf and Kudeshia, 1983

Genus of wasps

Pomphale is a genus of hymenopteran insects of the family Eulophidae.
