= Myrmobomyia =

Scientific classification
- Domain: Eukaryota
- Kingdom: Animalia
- Phylum: Arthropoda
- Class: Insecta
- Order: Hymenoptera
- Family: Eulophidae
- Subfamily: Entedoninae
- Genus: Myrmobomyia; Gumovsky and Boucek, 2005

Species
- Myrmobomyia malayana Gumovsky and Boucek, 2005

Genus of wasps

Myrmobomyia is a genus of hymenopteran insects of the family Eulophidae.
