= Driopteron =

Scientific classification
- Domain: Eukaryota
- Kingdom: Animalia
- Phylum: Arthropoda
- Class: Insecta
- Order: Hymenoptera
- Family: Eulophidae
- Subfamily: Entedoninae
- Genus: Driopteron; Hansson, 2004

Type species
- Driopteron cristatum Hansson, 2004

Species
- Driopteron azofeifai Hansson, 2004; Driopteron callainum Hansson, 2004; Driopteron cristatum Hansson, 2004; Driopteron exilicornis Hansson, 2004; Driopteron folioides Hansson, 2004; Driopteron limonense Hansson, 2004

Genus of wasps

Driopteron is a genus of hymenopteran insects of the family Eulophidae.
