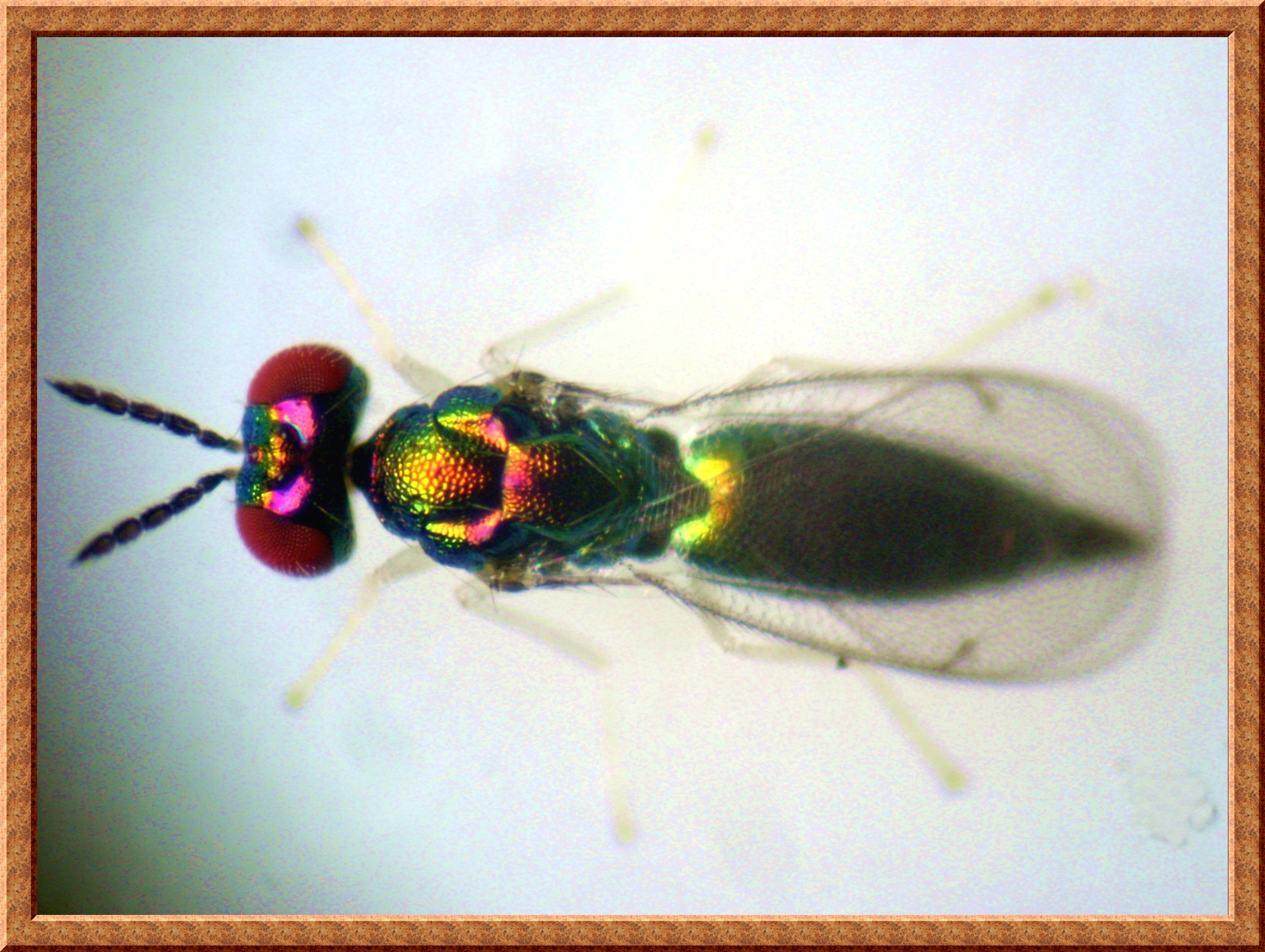

Scientific classification
- Domain: Eukaryota
- Kingdom: Animalia
- Phylum: Arthropoda
- Class: Insecta
- Order: Hymenoptera
- Family: Eulophidae
- Subfamily: Entedoninae
- Genus: Chrysocharis; Förster, 1856

Type species
- Chrysocharis pubicornis (Zetterstedt, 1838)

Species
- 130+ species

= Chrysocharis =

Genus of wasps

Chrysocharis is a genus of hymenopteran insects of the family Eulophidae. Species in this genus are parasitoids as larvae, with hosts of multiple species being Agromyzidae flies.
