= Aulogymnus albipes =

Scientific classification
- Kingdom: Animalia
- Phylum: Arthropoda
- Clade: Pancrustacea
- Class: Insecta
- Order: Hymenoptera
- Family: Eulophidae
- Genus: Aulogymnus
- Species: A. albipes

Binomial name
- Aulogymnus albipes Askew, 1959

Synonyms
- Olynx albipes Askew, 1959

Species of insect

Aulogymnus albipes is a species of insect from the Eulophidae family. It was described by Askew in 1959, and has been found in Kiryat Tiv'on, Israel. It has bronze-green coloration on its head and thorax, and its body length ranges from 2.8–3.6 mm.

== Etymology ==
The name albipes comes from Latin, and translates to white-legged. This directly refers to A. albipes' white tibiae.
