= Aulogymnus balani =

Scientific classification
- Kingdom: Animalia
- Phylum: Arthropoda
- Clade: Pancrustacea
- Class: Insecta
- Order: Hymenoptera
- Family: Eulophidae
- Genus: Aulogymnus
- Species: A. balani

Binomial name
- Aulogymnus balani Pujade-Villar, 1991

Synonyms
- Olynx balani Pujade-Villar, 1991

Species of insect

Aulogymnus balani is a species of insect from the Eulophidae family. It was described by the Spanish entomologist Juli Pujade-Villar in 1991. It is known to host on acorn galls of cynipid wasps such as Pseudoneuroterus saliens, Dryocosmus kuriphilus and Synophrus olivieri.

== Etymology ==
The species derives its name from the Catalan term bálan, which means "acorn".

== Distribution ==
The species has been found in Spain (Catalonia and Málaga) and Tunisia.
