= Oradis =

Scientific classification
- Domain: Eukaryota
- Kingdom: Animalia
- Phylum: Arthropoda
- Class: Insecta
- Order: Hymenoptera
- Family: Eulophidae
- Subfamily: Entedoninae
- Genus: Oradis; Hansson, 2002

Type species
- Oradis phaeomeles Hansson, 2002

Species
- Oradis phaeomeles Hansson, 2002; Oradis selva Hansson, 2002

Genus of wasps

Oradis is a genus of hymenopteran insects of the family Eulophidae.
