= Janicharis =

Scientific classification
- Domain: Eukaryota
- Kingdom: Animalia
- Phylum: Arthropoda
- Class: Insecta
- Order: Hymenoptera
- Family: Eulophidae
- Subfamily: Entedoninae
- Genus: Janicharis; Gumovsky and Delvare, 2006

Species
- Janicharis africana Gumovsky and Delvare, 2006

Genus of wasps

Janicharis is a genus of hymenopteran insects of the family Eulophidae.
