= Euderomphale =

Scientific classification
- Domain: Eukaryota
- Kingdom: Animalia
- Phylum: Arthropoda
- Class: Insecta
- Order: Hymenoptera
- Family: Eulophidae
- Subfamily: Euderinae
- Genus: Euderomphale; Girault, 1916

Type species
- Euderomphale flavimedia (Howard, 1881)

Species
- 21 Species

Genus of wasps

Euderomphale is a genus of hymenopteran insects of the family Eulophidae.
