= Horismenus floridensis =

Scientific classification
- Kingdom: Animalia
- Phylum: Arthropoda
- Clade: Pancrustacea
- Class: Insecta
- Order: Hymenoptera
- Family: Eulophidae
- Genus: Horismenus
- Species: H. floridensis

Binomial name
- Horismenus floridensis (Schauff & Boucek, 1987)

Synonyms
- Alachua floridensis Schauff & Boucek, 1987

Species of wasp parasitic on ants

Horismenus floridensis is a species of hymenopteran insect of the family Eulophidae. It is parasitic on the pupae of Camponotus floridanus, the Florida carpenter ant. Up to 21 H. floridensis wasps may develop on one C. floridanus pupa. H. floridensis was described by Schauff and Boucek in 1987 as Alachua floridensis and reassigned to Horismenus by Christer Hansson in 2009.

H. floridensis has been reported in Campeche, Mexico, where it is parasitic on the pupae of Camponotus atriceps, the American carpenter ant.
