= Xenopomphale =

Scientific classification
- Kingdom: Animalia
- Phylum: Arthropoda
- Class: Insecta
- Order: Hymenoptera
- Family: Eulophidae
- Subfamily: Entedoninae
- Genus: Xenopomphale; Hansson and LaSalle, 2003

Species
- Xenopomphale sulcata Hansson and LaSalle, 2003

Genus of wasps

Xenopomphale is a genus of hymenopteran insects of the family Eulophidae.
