= Sporrongia =

Scientific classification
- Domain: Eukaryota
- Kingdom: Animalia
- Phylum: Arthropoda
- Class: Insecta
- Order: Hymenoptera
- Family: Eulophidae
- Subfamily: Entedoninae
- Genus: Sporrongia; Gumovsky, 1998

Species
- Sporrongia tobagoiensis Gumovsky, 1998

Genus of wasps

Sporrongia is a genus of hymenopteran insects of the family Eulophidae.
