= Platocharis =

Scientific classification
- Domain: Eukaryota
- Kingdom: Animalia
- Phylum: Arthropoda
- Class: Insecta
- Order: Hymenoptera
- Family: Eulophidae
- Subfamily: Entedoninae
- Genus: Platocharis; Kerrich, 1969

Species
- Platocharis coffeae (Ferrière, 1936)

Genus of wasps

Platocharis is a genus of hymenopteran insects of the family Eulophidae.
