= Pediocharis =

Scientific classification
- Kingdom: Animalia
- Phylum: Arthropoda
- Class: Insecta
- Order: Hymenoptera
- Family: Eulophidae
- Subfamily: Entedoninae
- Genus: Pediocharis; Boucek, 1988

Type species
- Pediocharis albipes Boucek, 1988

Species
- Pediocharis albipes Boucek, 1988; Pediocharis malaris Boucek, 1988

Genus of wasps

Pediocharis is a genus of hymenopteran insects of the family Eulophidae.
