= Sifraneurus =

Scientific classification
- Domain: Eukaryota
- Kingdom: Animalia
- Phylum: Arthropoda
- Class: Insecta
- Order: Hymenoptera
- Family: Eulophidae
- Subfamily: Entedoninae
- Genus: Sifraneurus; Hansson and LaSalle, 2003

Species
- Sifraneurus strigifer Hansson and LaSalle, 2003

Genus of wasps

Sifraneurus is a genus of hymenopteran insects of the family Eulophidae.
