= Sanyangia =

Scientific classification
- Domain: Eukaryota
- Kingdom: Animalia
- Phylum: Arthropoda
- Class: Insecta
- Order: Hymenoptera
- Family: Eulophidae
- Subfamily: Entedoninae
- Genus: Sanyangia; Yang, 1996

Species
- Sanyangia propinquae Yang, 1996

Genus of wasps

Sanyangia is a genus of hymenopteran insects of the family Eulophidae.
