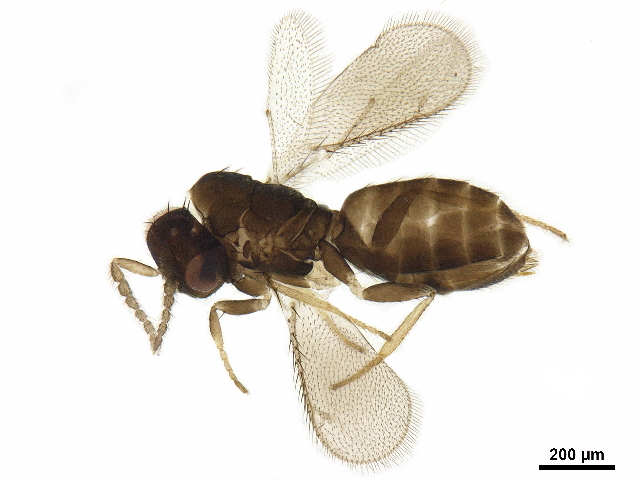
- Acanthala species from Costa Rica

Scientific classification
- Domain: Eukaryota
- Kingdom: Animalia
- Phylum: Arthropoda
- Class: Insecta
- Order: Hymenoptera
- Family: Eulophidae
- Subfamily: Entedoninae
- Genus: Acanthala; Hansson, 2000

Type species
- Acanthala pubipennis Hansson, 2000

Species
- Acanthala albiclava Hansson, 2000; Acanthala plaumanni Hansson, 2000; Acanthala pubipennis Hansson, 2000

= Acanthala =

Genus of wasps

Acanthala is a genus of generally dull-colored parasitoid wasps in the family Eulophidae, with three described species. The name Acanthala is a combination of the Greek root acantha, meaning "spiny" and Latin ala, meaning "wing". This refers to the diagnostic row of strong spinelike hairs on the upper surface of the marginal vein. The genus is only known from the Neotropics, with two species known from Brazil and a third from Belize and Costa Rica. The biology of the genus is unknown.

Species in the genus Acanthala can be recognized by the following combination of characteristics: dorsal surface of the marginal vein with a row of strong setae, eyes hairy, mandibles with a single tooth, pedicel conspicuously hairy dorsally, and the mesoscutum and scutellum with small-meshed and strong reticulation.
