= Neopomphale =

Scientific classification
- Domain: Eukaryota
- Kingdom: Animalia
- Phylum: Arthropoda
- Class: Insecta
- Order: Hymenoptera
- Family: Eulophidae
- Subfamily: Entedoninae
- Genus: Neopomphale; LaSalle and Schauff, 1994

Type species
- Neopomphale aleurothrixi (Dozier, 1932)

Species
- 21 species

Genus of wasps

Neopomphale is a genus of hymenopteran insects of the family Eulophidae.
