= Piekna =

Scientific classification
- Kingdom: Animalia
- Phylum: Arthropoda
- Class: Insecta
- Order: Hymenoptera
- Family: Eulophidae
- Subfamily: Entedoninae
- Genus: Piekna; Boucek, 1988

Species
- Piekna nitens Boucek, 1988

Genus of insects

Piekna is a genus of hymenopteran insects of the family Eulophidae.
