= Aulogymnus arifaokhani =

Scientific classification
- Kingdom: Animalia
- Phylum: Arthropoda
- Clade: Pancrustacea
- Class: Insecta
- Order: Hymenoptera
- Family: Eulophidae
- Genus: Aulogymnus
- Species: A. arifaokhani

Binomial name
- Aulogymnus arifaokhani Özdikmen, 2011

Synonyms
- Aulogymnus indicus Agnihotri & Sushil, 2005

Species of insect

Aulogymnus arifaokhani is a species of insect from the Eulophidae family. It was described by Turkish entomologist Hüseyin Özdikmen in 2011, and is found in Uttar Pradesh and Uttaranchal, India. The species was originally described as Aulogymnus indicus by Agnihotri and Sushil, but since the name A. indicus was already assigned to a different taxon, A. arifaokhani was renamed by Özdikmen per the principle of homonymy.

== Etymology ==
A. arifaokhani is named after Nikhat Arifa and M. A. Khan, who described the separate species A. indicus in 1992.
