= Klyngon =

Scientific classification
- Domain: Eukaryota
- Kingdom: Animalia
- Phylum: Arthropoda
- Class: Insecta
- Order: Hymenoptera
- Family: Eulophidae
- Subfamily: Entedoninae
- Genus: Klyngon; Hansson, 2005

Type species
- Klyngon jimenezi Hansson, 2005

Species
- 13 species

Genus of wasps

Klyngon is a genus of hymenopteran insects of the family Eulophidae.
