= Aleuroctonus =

Scientific classification
- Kingdom: Animalia
- Phylum: Arthropoda
- Clade: Pancrustacea
- Class: Insecta
- Order: Hymenoptera
- Family: Eulophidae
- Subfamily: Entedoninae
- Genus: Aleuroctonus; Lasalle & Schauff, 1994

Type species
- Aleuroctonus vittatus (Dozier, 1933)

Species
- Aleuroctonus latiscapus Hansson & LaSalle, 2003; Aleuroctonus marki Hansson & LaSalle, 2003; Aleuroctonus metallicus Hansson & LaSalle, 2003; Aleuroctonus vittatus (Dozier, 1933)

Genus of wasps

Aleuroctonus is a genus of hymenopteran insects of the family Eulophidae.
