= Ambocybe =

Scientific classification
- Kingdom: Animalia
- Phylum: Arthropoda
- Clade: Pancrustacea
- Class: Insecta
- Order: Hymenoptera
- Family: Eulophidae
- Subfamily: Entedoninae
- Genus: Ambocybe; Ubaidillah & Lasalle, 2000

Species
- Ambocybe petiolata Ubaidillah & Lasalle, 2000

Genus of wasps

Ambocybe is a monotypic genus of hymenopteran insects of the family Eulophidae, from the Indomalayan and Australasian Regions.
