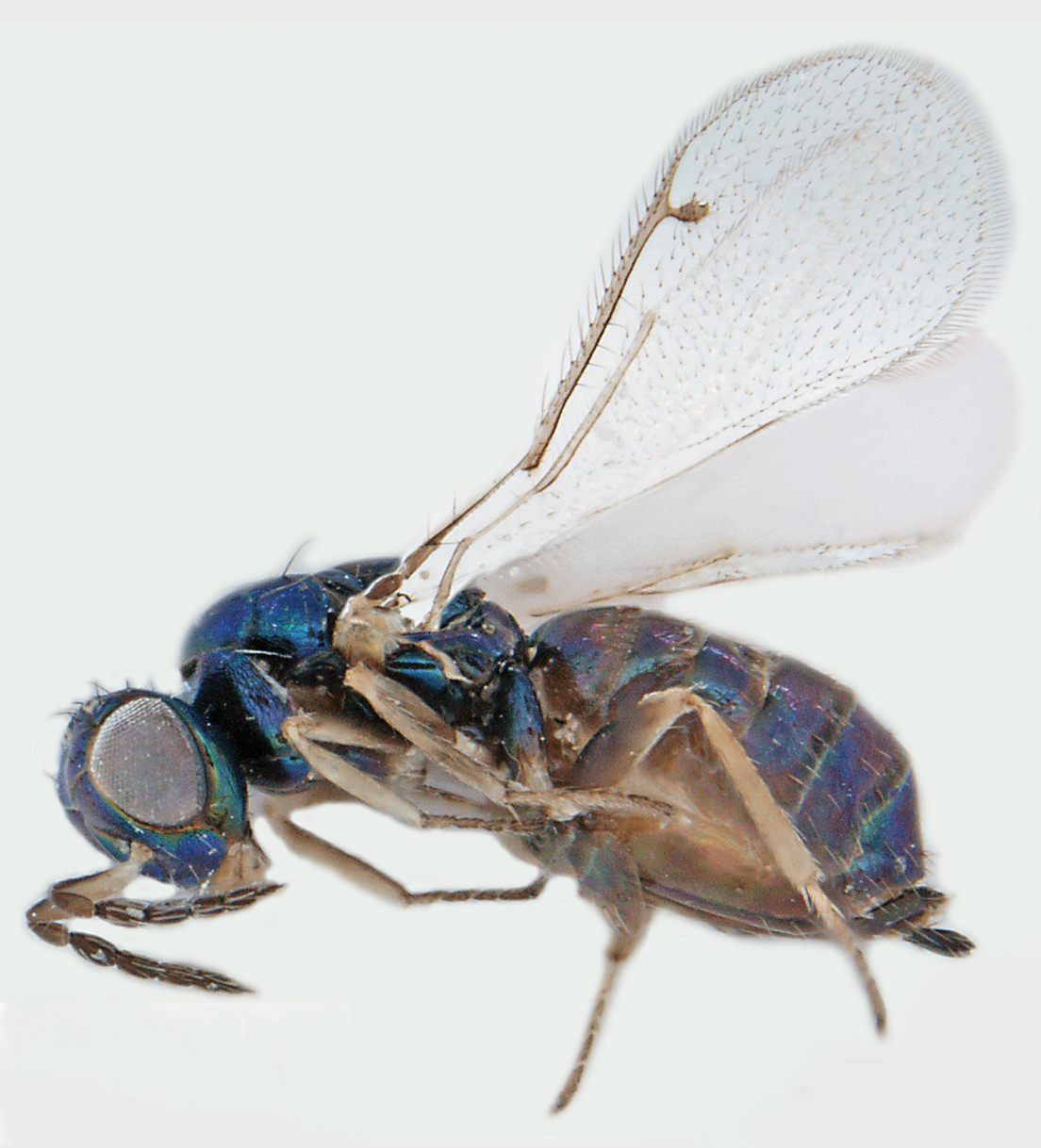
- Female Omphale cornula (1.5 mm)

Scientific classification
- Kingdom: Animalia
- Phylum: Arthropoda
- Class: Insecta
- Order: Hymenoptera
- Family: Eulophidae
- Genus: Omphale
- Species: O. cornula

Binomial name
- Omphale cornula Hansson & Shevtsova, 2012

= Omphale cornula =

Species of wasp

Omphale cornula is a species of wasp in the family Eulophidae. It is known from western Europe (France, Netherlands, United Kingdom, Denmark, and Sweden).

The body length is 1–1.2 mm (0.039–0.047 in) in males and 1.2–1.5 mm (0.047–0.059 in) in females. The host is unknown but other Omphale are parasitoids of gall midges (Cecidomyiidae).
