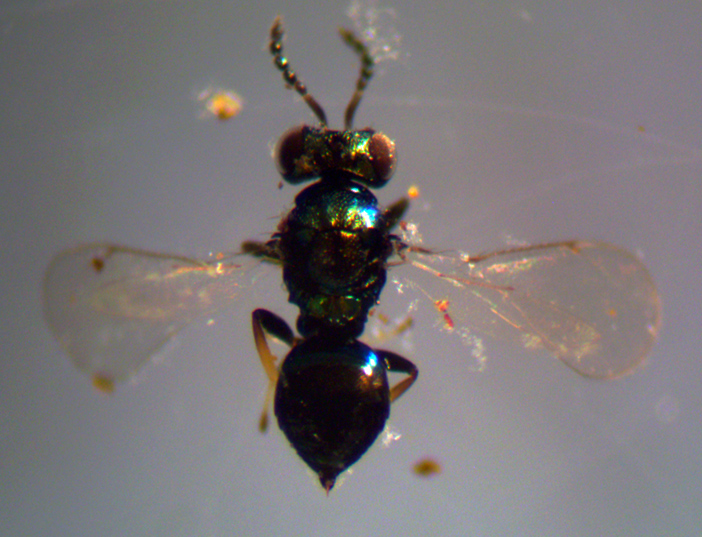
- Horismenus sp

Scientific classification
- Kingdom: Animalia
- Phylum: Arthropoda
- Class: Insecta
- Order: Hymenoptera
- Family: Eulophidae
- Subfamily: Entedoninae
- Genus: Horismenus; Walker, 1843

Type species
- Horismenus cleodora Walker, 1843

Species
- Horismenus floridensis 400 other species

Synonyms
- Akonda Cameron, 1913; Alachua Schauff and Boucek, 1987; Dirphiphagus Brèthes, 1917; Edovum Grissell, 1981; Holcopeltoideus Ashmead, 1904; Holcopeltomorpha Blanchard, 1942; Perhymenes Brèthes, 1916; Podkova Gumovsky and Boucek, 2003; Psephenivorus Burks, 1968; Pseudomphale Schrottky, 1909; Triolynx Cameron, 1913

= Horismenus =

Genus of wasps

Horismenus is a genus of hymenopteran insects of the family Eulophidae occurring primarily in the Americas. As of 2015 over 400 species in the genus have been described. Horismenus species are often described as parasitizing other insects.
