= Gordon Gordh =

American entomologist

- Born: 1945 (age 80–81)
- Education: University of Colorado
- Scientific career
- Fields: Entomology
- Workplaces: United States Department of Agriculture; Systematic Entomology Laboratory; National Museum of Natural History

Gordon Gordh (born 1945) is an American entomologist.

== Biography ==
Gordh was born in 1945. In 1967, he received a bachelor's degree from the University of Colorado, and in 1972 his master's degree at the University of Kansas. Later on he got his Ph.D. from the University of California, Riverside in 1974. During the same year he accepted a position as a research entomologist at the United States Department of Agriculture. There he was working in Systematic Entomology Laboratory that was located at National Museum of Natural History in Washington, D.C., a work that he was doing till 1977. He studied parasitoid wasps from the Hymenopteran superfamily Chalcidoidea.

== Works ==
According to the Library of Congress, he wrote the following works:

- Gordh, Gordon (1975), The comparative external morphology and systematics of the neotropical parasitic fig wasp genus Idarnes, (Hymenoptera, Torymidae), University of Kansas
- Gordh, Gordon; Triapitsyn, V. A. (1981), Taxonomic studies of the Encyrtidae with the descriptions of new species and a new genus, University of California Press, ISBN 0520096290
- Dahms, Edward; Gordh, Gordon (1997), A review of the genera of Australian Encyrtidae (Hymenoptera: Chalcidoidea) described from Australia by A.A. Girault with a checklist of included species, Associated Publishers, ISBN 1566650658
- Gordh, Gordon; Headrick, David (2001), A Dictionary of Entomology, CAB International, ISBN 0851992919
- Gordh, Gordon; Headrick, David (2011), A Dictionary of Entomology, CAB International, ISBN 9781845935429
