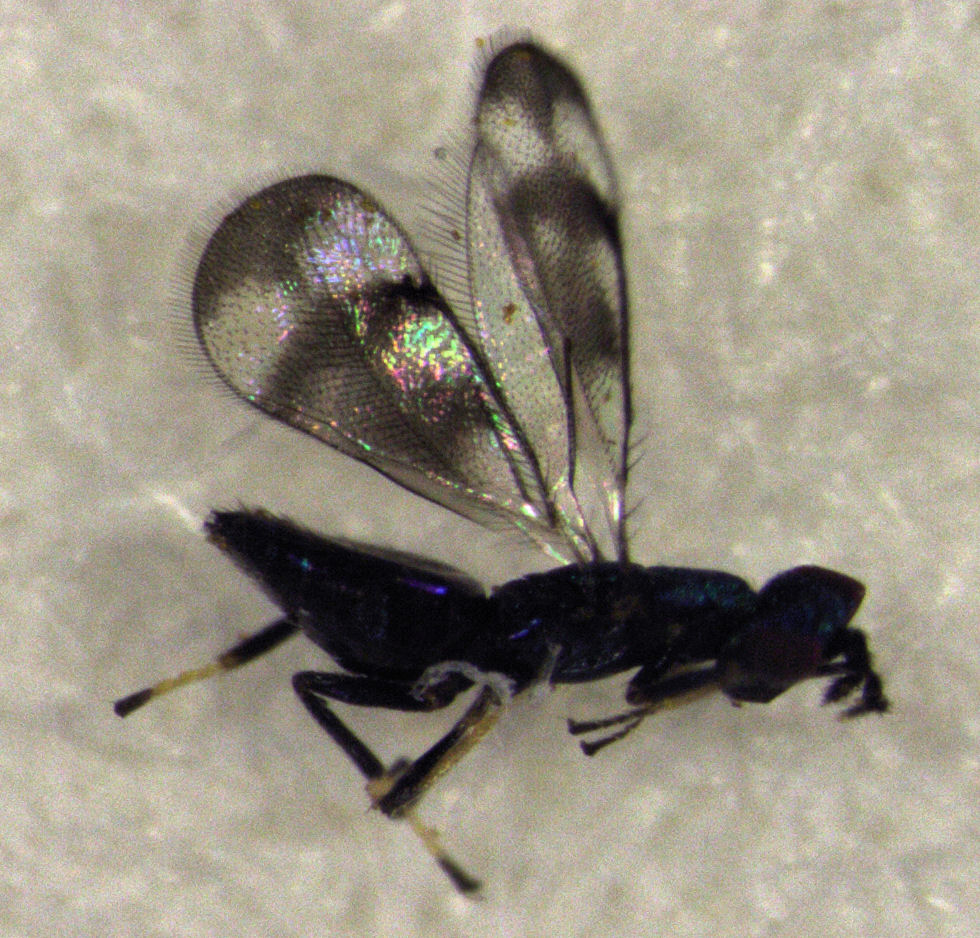
- Closterocerus cruy female

Scientific classification
- Domain: Eukaryota
- Kingdom: Animalia
- Phylum: Arthropoda
- Class: Insecta
- Order: Hymenoptera
- Family: Eulophidae
- Subfamily: Entedoninae
- Genus: Closterocerus; Westwood, 1833

Type species
- Closterocerus dubius (Girault, 1913)

Species
- 74 Species

= Closterocerus =

Genus of wasps

Closterocerus is a genus of hymenopteran insects of the family Eulophidae.
