= Holarcticesa =

Scientific classification
- Kingdom: Animalia
- Phylum: Arthropoda
- Clade: Pancrustacea
- Class: Insecta
- Order: Hymenoptera
- Family: Eulophidae
- Subfamily: Entedoninae
- Genus: Holarcticesa; Koçak and Kemal, 2010

Type species
- Holarcticesa tatrica (Erdos, 1966)

Species
- Holarcticesa clinius (Walker, 1839); Holarcticesa tatrica (Erdos, 1966)

Synonyms
- Grahamia Erdos, 1966

Genus of wasps

Holarcticesa is a genus of hymenopteran insects of the family Eulophidae. Species of Holarcticesa are known from Europe and the Nearctic region.
