= Inti levis =

Scientific classification
- Domain: Eukaryota
- Kingdom: Animalia
- Phylum: Arthropoda
- Class: Insecta
- Order: Hymenoptera
- Family: Eulophidae
- Genus: Inti; Hansson, 2010
- Species: I. levis

Binomial name
- Inti levis Hansson, 2010

Species of wasp

Inti levis is a species of insect in a monotypic genus in the family Eulophidae. It was discovered in Costa Rica and the Dominican Republic in 2010 by Christer Hansson.
