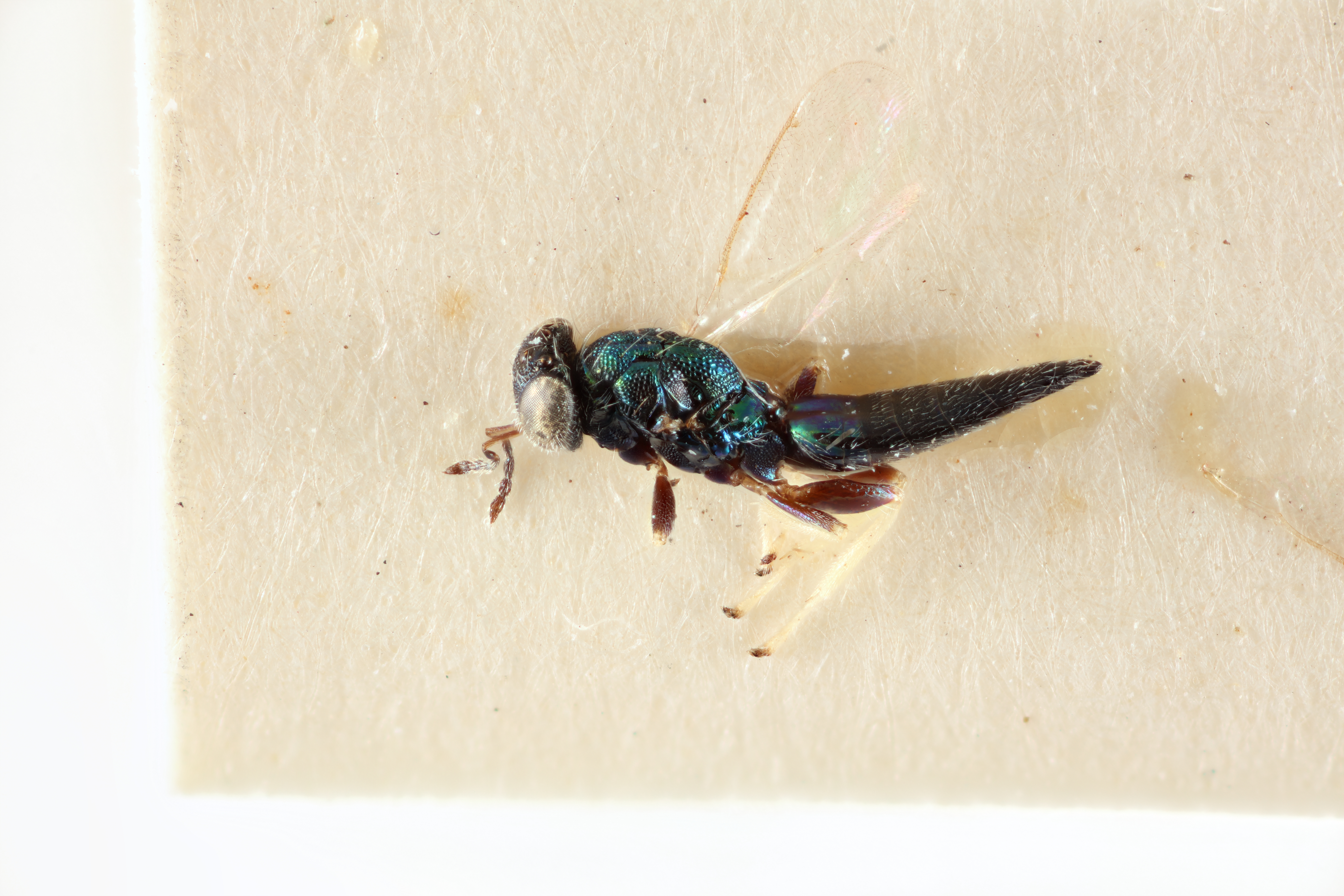

Scientific classification
- Kingdom: Animalia
- Phylum: Arthropoda
- Clade: Pancrustacea
- Class: Insecta
- Order: Hymenoptera
- Family: Eulophidae
- Genus: Afrotroppopsis
- Species: A. risbeci

Binomial name
- Afrotroppopsis risbeci Gumovsky, 2007

= Afrotroppopsis =

Genus of wasps

Afrotroppopsis risbeci is a species of wasp in the family Eulophidae, found in Africa. It is the only member of the monotypic genus Afrotroppopsis.
