= Arnold Förster =

German entomologist (1810–1884)

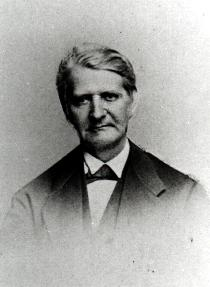
Arnold Förster

Arnold Förster (20 January 1810 – 13 August 1884) was a German entomologist, who worked mainly on Coleoptera and Hymenoptera.

== Life ==
Arnold Förster was born on 20 January 1810 in Aachen, Germany, where he died on 12 August 1884. He was Oberlehrer, or an upper teacher, in Aachen for his entire adult life. He worked ceaselessly on entomology, paying particular attention to Coleoptera and Hymenoptera. He was a pioneering author on Hymenoptera.

== Work ==
Selection

- Hymenopterologische Studien I . Formicariae: 74 pp. Aachen. (1850)
- Hymenopterologische Studien. II . Chalcidiae und Prototrupii. Aachen: Ernst ter Meer 152 pp.(1856)
- Synopsis der Familien und Gattungen der Braconen Verhandlungen des Naturhistorischen Vereins der Preussischen Rheinlande und Westfalens. 19: 225–228 (1862)
- Synopsis der Familien und Gattungen der Ichneumonen. Verhandlungen des Naturhistorischen Vereins der Preussischen Rheinlande und Westfalens. 25(1868):135-221.(1869)

== Collections ==
Förster’s Coleoptera and Hemiptera and some of his Hymenoptera - Cynipidae, Ichneumonidae (Cryptinae excl. Pezomachini and Stilpnini, Pimplinae, and Ophioninae excl. Plectiscini and Campoplex), Braconidae, Chrysididae, Formicidae and Vespidae - are in the Natural History Museum of Berlin; his Tenthredinidae, Ichneumonidae (Pezomachini, Stilpnini, Tryphonini, Plectiscini and Campoplex) and Apidae are in Munich State Museum; Proctotrupoidea and Chalcidoidea and the rest of the Ichneumonidae are in the Natural History Museum, Vienna. The rest of Förster’s insects (e.g. Sphecidae, Diptera - incl. many types of species described by Johann Wilhelm Meigen) are in the Zoological Museum of Halle.

Förster’s notebooks contain keys and descriptions, mostly of genera of Hymenoptera (almost the entirety of the Ichneumonidae), are in the Smithsonian Institution. They are written in German, Greek, and Latin and contain unpublished information. Some refer to the Irish entomologist Alexander Henry Haliday.
