= Alexandre Arsène Girault =

American entomologist

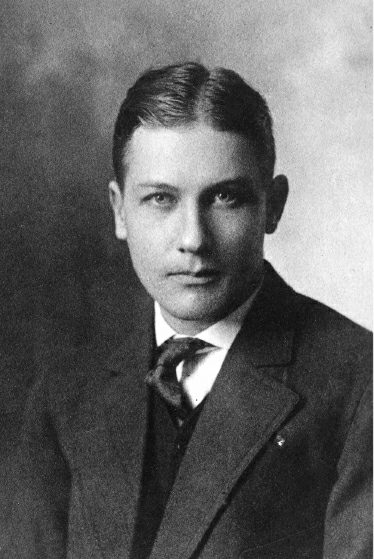
- Alexandre Arsène Girault at age 20 (c. 1904)
- Born: January 9, 1884; Annapolis, Maryland
- Died: May 2, 1941 (aged 57); Dunwich Benevolent Asylum, North Stradbroke Island, Australia
- Education: Virginia Polytechnic Institute and State University
- Known for: Chalcidoidea systematics
- Spouse: Elizabeth Jeannette Girault
- Scientific career
- Fields: Entomology
- Author abbrev. (zoology): Girault

Alexandre Arsène Girault (/ʒɪəˈroʊ/ zhee-ROH; 9 January 1884 – 2 May 1941) was an American entomologist specializing in the study of chalcid wasps. An eccentric and controversial figure, Girault was also a prolific and dedicated entomologist. He published more than 325 papers and described over 3000 new taxa from Australia.

== Biography ==
Alexandre Arsène Girault was born in Annapolis, Maryland, on January 9, 1884, to Joseph Bonaparte Girault and Elizabeth Frances Girault (née Goodwin). He is named after his grandfather, Arsène Napoleon Alexandre Girault de Saint Fargeau, one of the founding faculty of the US Naval Academy.

Girault earned his Bachelor of Science degree from the Virginia Polytechnic Institute and State University in 1903. From 1904 to 1907 he was employed as a field assistant for the United States Bureau of Entomology. During this time, he was involved in research on plum curculios (Conotrachelus nenuphar), Colorado potato beetles (Leptinotarsa decemlineata), and American plum borers (Euzophera semifuneralis). In 1908, he moved to Urbana, Illinois, where he worked as a laboratory assistant of the Illinois State Entomologist. From 1909 to 1911 (still in the employ of the Illinois State Entomologist), he worked as an assistant in entomology at the University of Illinois, studying bedbugs (Cimex spp.) and Colorado potato beetles.

In a paper published in 1908, Girault vividly described an encounter with bedbugs in 1907 in a hotel room in Cincinnati, Ohio. He was reluctant to sleep on the bed after discovering the bedbugs as he entered the room a little after midnight. He eventually decided to keep the lights on and to lie across the bed without getting under the covers. He slept fitfully, constantly waking up to find bedbugs scurrying away after feeding on him. At 3:30 AM, he eventually gave up and slept on a rocking chair. Despite the discomfort, he systematically described the behaviour and stages of maturity of the bedbugs, the general conditions of the room, and attempted to search for eggs and moultings of the insects.

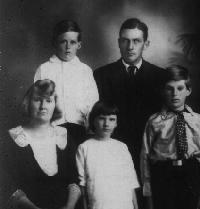
Alexandre Arsène Girault and family (left to right: Elizabeth, Lawrence, Helen, Alexandre, and Ernest). Taken at Stanthorpe, Queensland on April 25, 1924. Frank and Daisy Girault have yet to be born at this time.

Shortly before the outbreak of World War I, the Government of Queensland requested the services of an entomologist from the US Department of Agriculture (USDA), hoping to discover the reason for the failure of the sugarcane crops in Queensland. Highly recommended by his superiors, Girault moved to Australia in 1911. He worked for the Bureau of Sugar Experiment Stations (BSES) in Nelson (now Gordonvale, Queensland) at an annual salary of £400. His main area of study while in BSES was the cane beetle (Dermolepida albohirtum), a pest of sugarcanes; but he also studied parasitoid wasps (his area of expertise and personal interest), as well as some true bugs and thrips. Here, he met and married Elizabeth Jeannette Pilcher in 1911. Their first child, Ernest Alexandre Girault, was born on November 3, 1913.

In 1914, Girault moved back to the United States to resume working for the USDA. He worked in Washington, D.C., on Chalcidoidea systematics. During this time, his wife gave birth to their second son and first daughter, Lawrence Joseph Girault on August 27, 1915, and Helen Joan Girault on August 10, 1917. He strongly disliked the city, describing it as a "bedlam" and "a place unfit for scholarship." Yet during this time, he also finished his major work, a 900-page monograph on chalcid wasps.

Girault returned to Australia in 1917 to work as assistant entomologist in the Queensland Department of Agriculture and Stock. He and his family lived in Indooroopilly, Brisbane, where his second daughter and third son were born (Daisy Lydia Girault on July 19, 1925, and Frank Stephen Girault on May 23, 1928). He never returned to the United States, though he retained his American citizenship.

Girault's work was irregular in Australia, including periods of unemployment. This was exacerbated by bad economic conditions in Australia as a result of World War I. His work at the Department of Agriculture and Stock ceased in 1919, but resumed again from 1923 to 1930. At times, Girault was forced to work in jobs unrelated to his field of expertise out of necessity (including working as a shopkeeper and as a rock-breaker in a stone quarry). He also increasingly became disillusioned with economic entomology (which also prompted his departure from the United States). He began to include acerbic criticisms, poems, and essays in his papers, resulting in publishers turning his work away and frequent clashes with superiors and colleagues. His love for pure taxonomy, however, led him to publish numerous papers privately. Most of these were short notes and often printed poorly.

His wife contracted tuberculosis while in Australia, leaving her bedridden for years until her death on September 9, 1931. Devastated, Girault's behaviour increasingly became erratic and paranoid. One afternoon, around 1936, Girault started shouting at their neighbours for hours for no apparent reason. This continued on into the night until someone finally called the police who took him away. Two days later, his sons, Ernest and Frank, drove him to Goodna Mental Hospital. He was admitted several more times into the asylum. He was on leave from the Goodna asylum in the care of his son until 9 May 1940 when he was admitted to Dunwich Benevolent Asylum on North Stradbroke Island on 16 July 1940 where he died on 2 May 1941 at the age of 57. His cause of death was officially listed as paraphrenia and exhaustion. He was buried at Dunwich Cemetery and now lies in an unmarked grave.

== Legacy ==
Girault was a controversial and eccentric figure. Even though most of his career was spent in economic entomology, he deeply loathed the economic aspects of his work and was obsessed with the importance of science for its own sake. He described the use of entomology for economic gains as a "prostitution of science and learning." He gained notoriety for his scathing criticism of scientists who worked for such purposes (including those he worked with and worked for such as L.O. Howard). His earlier remarks were mostly aimed at his American superiors and colleagues in Washington. Most of these were in the form of essays or poetry (Girault's other great passion). At times, it consisted of a single sentence inserted in the most unlikely places. Among a list of synonyms in Descriptiones hymenopterorum chalcidoidicarum variorum cum observationibus (1917), is the completely out of place "Liberty is Soul". One of his most famous poems was aimed at his USDA superior and the then president of the Entomological Society of Washington, Altus Lacy Quaintance. It was entitled A Song after the manner of 'Auld Lang Syne':

Should A. L. Quaintance be forgot
And other childish men?
Who their first love let go to pot
that they might fatten.

His Australian colleagues and superiors became the target of his criticism after he moved permanently to Australia. This was most likely the reason for his later difficulties in finding employment. A more eloquent essay of his position can be found in a 1920 paper:

Research is a labour of love. Strange then to find it all done nowadays as a labour of wages! Must love, too, be a matter of cash? Does the lover demand a wage before espousing the maiden of his choice? By Heaven! it has come to that. Is not such a one now before us, a lover of insects at Cairns demanding and getting his cold thousand, with perquisites, before he will so much as embrace a single gnat? Do not I see other lovers doing the like, bargaining for their loves, all over the habitable globe? 'Tis ruinous. Will not offspring be scarcer and scarcer, bastardy at that, the mothers prostitutes? What a spectacle! In the meanwhile, all true loves may go to the Devil; incidentally, also all men and all things whatsoever without cash.

But who cannot see that these copper-hunting men are not true lovers, but only poachers, snarers, and cunning trappers (not likely to become good fathers!)? Courage, Huntsmen!

Nature is to be explored and known by mankind, not only because she holds so much food and means for living, but also, and mostly, because she is the expression of the majesty of the mystical All. Are these chalcid-flies below but so many more parasites with which it is hoped to increase our already superfluous wealth? Far other I see them.

— Alexandre Arsène Girault, Some Insects never before seen by Mankind (1920). Brisbane, Australia

In the same paper, he also described a parody genus and species of a mymarid wasp, Shillingsworthia shillingsworthi from the planet Jupiter. It was a sarcastic insult meant for his then superior, Johann Francis Illingworth:

Shillingsworthia: Like Polynema but petiole, head, abdomen, mandibles absent. S. shillingsworthii, blank, vacant, inaneness perfect. Nulliebiety remarkable, visible only from certain points of view. Shadowless. An airy species whose flight cannot be followed except by the winged mind. From a naked chasm on Jupiter, August 5th, 1919.

This so thin genus is consecrated to Doctor Johann Francis Illingworth, in these days remarkable for his selfless devotion to entomology, not only sacrificing all of the comforts of life, but as well his health and reputation to the uncompromising search for truth and for love of "those filmy people of the air." Honour him!

— Alexandre Arsène Girault, Some Insects never before seen by Mankind (1920). Brisbane, Australia

In one instance, the director of the Queensland Department of Agriculture and Stock actually prohibited him from publishing several new genera and species. He published it anyway, under the cheekily titled Some new hexapods stolen from authority (1928).

Despite this, Girault was a dedicated and prolific taxonomist. He wrote over 325 papers, describing more than 3000 taxa (mostly of chalcid wasps). His great love for pure taxonomy is obvious in his writings. Besides criticism of his "traitorous" colleagues, he also used poetry at times to describe newly discovered species. Like other taxonomists, he also frequently dedicated the names of the wasps he described to people and causes he admired. This included many genus names including Davincia, Shakespearia, Beethovena, Mozartella, Elijahia, Emersonia, Emersonella, Emersonopsis, Raffaellia, Raphaelana, Raphaelonia, Ovidia, Goetheana, Goethella, Lutheria, Marxella, Marxiana, Thoreauella, Thoreauia, Tennysoniana, Lincolna, Lincolnanna, Bachiana, Keatsia, Whittieria, Plutarchia, Haeckeliania, Schilleria, Aeschylia, Aligheria, Aligherinia, Anselmella, Rubensteina, Carlyleia, Grotiusomyia, Grotiusella, Borrowella, Finlayia, Boudiennyia, Richteria, Ratzeburgalla, Buonapartea, Zamenhofella, Gounodia, Herodotia, Anthemiella, Delisleia, Cowperella, Cowperia, Hannibalia, Magellanana, Lamennaisia, Lomonosoffiella, Angeliconana, Giorgionia, and Froudeana, plus numerous epithets such as longfellowi, shakespearei, goethei, etc., as well as names honoring the Jewish people, and his children.

Even financial and publishing problems didn't stop him from continuing his work. About a third of the taxa he described were published with his own meagre funds. They were often very brief, very poorly printed, and were given away free to a very few institutions and fellow specialists working with Hymenoptera. Despite this, Girault's work is still considered valid by current taxonomists because of his careful preparation of the type specimens. Most of these were later donated to the Queensland Museum, from whence they can still be observed to this day. However, Girault died before he could complete his final great work, a monograph on Australian chalcid wasps started in 1917. The bulk of his work and his type specimens were later reexamined by the Queensland Museum Curator of Entomology Edward "Ted" J. Dahms in the 1970s. For this, Dahms was awarded a Doctor of Science degree by the University of Queensland. Dahms later collaborated with the entomologist Gordon Gordh in finishing the checklist of Australian chalcid wasps that Girault had started, an area of entomology that was largely ignored after Girault's death.

Taxa named after him include Plutarchia giraulti, which B. R. Subba Rao named in a 1974 paper.

== See also ==
- Fairyfly
- Encyrtidae
- Alexander Henry Haliday
- Francis Walker
- John Curtis
