= List of Eurytoma species =

This is a list of 621 species in the genus Eurytoma.

== Eurytoma species ==
- Eurytoma abalosi De Santis, 1964
- Eurytoma abatos Walker, 1843
- Eurytoma abdita Zerova, 1995
- Eurytoma abieticola Ratzeburg, 1844
- Eurytoma abnormiclava Girault, 1915
- Eurytoma abnormicornis Walsh, 1870
- Eurytoma abrotani (Panzer, 1801)
- Eurytoma acaciacola Hedqvist, 1967
- Eurytoma acaciae Risbec, 1951
- Eurytoma acericola Zerova, 1975
- Eurytoma aciculata Ratzeburg, 1848
- Eurytoma acroptilae Zerova, 1986
- Eurytoma acuminata Masi, 1940
- Eurytoma acus Bugbee, 1941
- Eurytoma acuta Bugbee, 1951
- Eurytoma adenophorae Zerova, 1993
- Eurytoma adiacrita Grissell, 1974
- Eurytoma adleriae Zerova, 1995
- Eurytoma aequabilis Bugbee, 1973
- Eurytoma aerflora Bugbee, 1975
- Eurytoma aethiops Boheman, 1836
- Eurytoma afra Boheman, 1836
- Eurytoma agalica Narendran, 1994
- Eurytoma albinervis Lindeman, 1881
- Eurytoma albotibialis Ashmead, 1905
- Eurytoma alhagicola Zerova, 1981
- Eurytoma almorensis Narendran, 1994
- Eurytoma aloineae (Burks, 1958)
- Eurytoma aloisifilippoi (Russo, 1938)
- Eurytoma altifossa Bugbee, 1967
- Eurytoma altiventris Masi, 1940
- Eurytoma amaranthusa Narendran, 1994
- Eurytoma amborasahae Risbec, 1952
- Eurytoma ampelodesmae (Viggiani, 1967)
- Eurytoma amplicoxa Bugbee, 1973
- Eurytoma amurensis Zerova, 1995
- Eurytoma amygdali Enderlein, 1907
- Eurytoma annilai Hedqvist, 1974
- Eurytoma annulipes Walker, 1832
- Eurytoma antica Walker, 1874
- Eurytoma antistrophi Bugbee, 1982
- Eurytoma anupama Narendran, 1994
- Eurytoma apantelesi Narendran, 1994
- Eurytoma apara Narendran, 1994
- Eurytoma aphloiae Risbec, 1952
- Eurytoma apicalis Walker, 1832
- Eurytoma apiculae Bugbee, 1966
- Eurytoma apionidis Risbec, 1951
- Eurytoma appendigaster (Swederus, 1795)
- Eurytoma arabica Risbec, 1951
- Eurytoma arachnophaga (Girault, 1925)
- Eurytoma arachnovora Hesse, 1942
- Eurytoma arctica Thomson, 1876
- Eurytoma aretheas Walker, 1839
- Eurytoma argentata Cameron, 1884
- Eurytoma argentifrons Askew, 2003
- Eurytoma arguta Zerova, 1995
- Eurytoma armenica Zerova & Fursov, 1991
- Eurytoma arnoldi Waterston, 1926
- Eurytoma aroueti Girault, 1929
- Eurytoma artemisiae Zerova, 1977
- Eurytoma ascendens Graham, 1984
- Eurytoma asiatica Zerova & Seryogina, 1999
- Eurytoma asphodeli Hedqvist, 1976
- Eurytoma asphondyliae Narendran, 1994
- Eurytoma aspila (Walker, 1836)
- Eurytoma asyneumae Zerova, 1993
- Eurytoma aterrima (Schrank, 1781)
- Eurytoma atra (Walker, 1832)
- Eurytoma atrateges Bugbee, 1941
- Eurytoma atripes Gahan, 1933
- Eurytoma attiva Burks, 1958
- Eurytoma augasmae Zerova, 1977
- Eurytoma aureata Bugbee, 1945
- Eurytoma aurifrons Cameron, 1884
- Eurytoma australiensis Ashmead, 1900
- Eurytoma baccae Bugbee, 1967
- Eurytoma bambeyi Risbec, 1951
- Eurytoma bangalorica Narendran, 1994
- Eurytoma banksi Ashmead, 1905
- Eurytoma bararakae Risbec, 1952
- Eurytoma basilewskyi Risbec, 1957
- Eurytoma bicolor Walsh, 1870
- Eurytoma bicolorata Zerova, 1978
- Eurytoma bicoloriventris Girault, 1915
- Eurytoma bigeloviae Ashmead, 1890
- Eurytoma biumbae Risbec, 1957
- Eurytoma blanci Kieffer, 1902
- Eurytoma blastophagi Hedqvist, 1963
- Eurytoma bolteri Riley, 1869
- Eurytoma borneana Cameron, 1911
- Eurytoma bouceki Zerova, 2005
- Eurytoma brevicoxa Zerova & Cam, 2003
- Eurytoma breviscaposa Narendran, 1994
- Eurytoma brevitergis Bugbee, 1975
- Eurytoma breviura Bugbee, 1945
- Eurytoma brevivena Bugbee, 1958
- Eurytoma bromi (Howard, 1896)
- Eurytoma browni Crawford, 1910
- Eurytoma brunneipennis Crawford, 1910
- Eurytoma brunniventris Ratzeburg, 1852
- Eurytoma bugbeei Grissell, 1974
- Eurytoma butcheri (Burks, 1969)
- Eurytoma calcarea Bugbee, 1951
- Eurytoma calicotomae Zerova, 2005
- Eurytoma californica Ashmead, 1887
- Eurytoma calycis Bugbee, 1961
- Eurytoma camaromyiae Blanchard, 1936
- Eurytoma campanulae Zerova, 1978
- Eurytoma camposa Narendran, 1994
- Eurytoma caraganae Nikol'skaya, 1952
- Eurytoma carinatifrons Crawford, 1910
- Eurytoma carlylei Girault, 1915
- Eurytoma carpini Decaux, 1893
- Eurytoma caryedocida Rasplus, 1988
- Eurytoma castor Claridge, 1959
- Eurytoma casuarinae Girault, 1917
- Eurytoma caudata Narendran, 1994
- Eurytoma caulicola Zerova, 1971
- Eurytoma ceanothi Bugbee, 1971
- Eurytoma cebennica Graham, 1984
- Eurytoma cedrus Bugbee, 1973
- Eurytoma celsa Bugbee, 1945
- Eurytoma celtigalla Bugbee, 1957
- Eurytoma centaureae Claridge, 1960
- Eurytoma ceratinae Narendran, 1994
- Eurytoma chacoana Blanchard, 1942
- Eurytoma chaitra Narendran, 1994
- Eurytoma chrysothamni Bugbee, 1975
- Eurytoma chrysothrix Waterston, 1924
- Eurytoma clarissae Zerova, 2006
- Eurytoma cleri Ashmead, 1894
- Eurytoma coleophorae Zerova, 1977
- Eurytoma coleopterae Zerova, 1978
- Eurytoma collaris Walker, 1832
- Eurytoma collina Zerova, 1984
- Eurytoma compressa Bugbee, 1939
- Eurytoma conapionis Rasplus, 1988
- Eurytoma condaliae Kieffer, 1910
- Eurytoma congolense Delucchi, 1956
- Eurytoma conica Provancher, 1887
- Eurytoma contractura Bugbee, 1967
- Eurytoma contraria Walker, 1860
- Eurytoma cordoi De Santis, 1983
- Eurytoma corpulenta Bugbee, 1945
- Eurytoma couridae Cameron, 1913
- Eurytoma cousiniae Zerova, 1995
- Eurytoma crambeae Zerova, 1978
- Eurytoma crambicola Zerova, 1981
- Eurytoma crassa Bugbee, 1967
- Eurytoma crassinervis Thomson, 1876
- Eurytoma cressoni Howard, 1897
- Eurytoma cretheis Walker, 1843
- Eurytoma crotolariae Risbec, 1951
- Eurytoma ctenodactylomyii Girault, 1917
- Eurytoma cuneiforma Bugbee, 1982
- Eurytoma curculionum Mayr, 1878
- Eurytoma curta Walker, 1832
- Eurytoma cylindrica Thomson, 1876
- Eurytoma cynipicola Zerova, 1976
- Eurytoma cynipsea Boheman, 1836
- Eurytoma cypriaca Masi, 1934
- Eurytoma daileyi Grissell, 1974
- Eurytoma danilovi Zerova, 1985
- Eurytoma densa Bugbee, 1945
- Eurytoma dentata Mayr, 1878
- Eurytoma descartesi Girault, 1925
- Eurytoma deserticola Zerova, 2004
- Eurytoma diastrophi Walsh, 1870
- Eurytoma differta Zerova, 1977
- Eurytoma diopsisi Risbec, 1956
- Eurytoma diorictriae Narendran, 1994
- Eurytoma discordans Bugbee, 1951
- Eurytoma dorcaschemae Ashmead, 1888
- Eurytoma dubiella Girault, 1915
- Eurytoma dumasi Girault, 1915
- Eurytoma duvanae Kieffer, 1910
- Eurytoma eccoptogastri Ratzeburg, 1844
- Eurytoma electa Crosby, 1909
- Eurytoma elistae Zerova, 1995
- Eurytoma ellenbergeri (Risbec, 1955)
- Eurytoma elongatula Silvestri, 1915
- Eurytoma elymi Zerova, 1978
- Eurytoma emarginata Narendran, 1994
- Eurytoma enicospilusi Risbec, 1952
- Eurytoma ephedrae Narendran & Prabha Sharma, 2006
- Eurytoma epicephalae Girault, 1915
- Eurytoma ermolenkoi Zerova, 1984
- Eurytoma erythroaspis Cameron, 1905
- Eurytoma esuriensi Yang, 1996
- Eurytoma eucalyptorum Girault, 1935
- Eurytoma euclus Walker, 1839
- Eurytoma eugeniae Risbec, 1952
- Eurytoma euphorbicola Zerova, 1994
- Eurytoma excellens Bugbee, 1945
- Eurytoma exempta Walker, 1871
- Eurytoma extincta Ratzeburg, 1852
- Eurytoma extremitatis Bugbee, 1968
- Eurytoma eylandti Girault, 1927
- Eurytoma festucae Zerova, 1977
- Eurytoma ficusgallae Boucek, 1981
- Eurytoma flaveola (Zerova, 1976)
- Eurytoma flavicornis Walker, 1836
- Eurytoma flavicrurensa Bugbee, 1951
- Eurytoma flavicrus Bugbee, 1967
- Eurytoma flavifacies Bugbee, 1969
- Eurytoma flavimana Boheman, 1836
- Eurytoma flavitegula Girault, 1915
- Eurytoma flaviventris Zerova, 1977
- Eurytoma flavocoxa Bugbee, 1941
- Eurytoma flavoscapularis Ratzeburg, 1844
- Eurytoma flavovaria (Ratzeburg, 1844)
- Eurytoma flavovultus Bugbee, 1957
- Eurytoma floridana (Ashmead, 1887)
- Eurytoma foligalla Bugbee, 1969
- Eurytoma fossae Bugbee, 1967
- Eurytoma fulva Bugbee, 1941
- Eurytoma fulviscapus (Girault, 1913)
- Eurytoma fulvivena Girault, 1928
- Eurytoma fumipennis Walker, 1836
- Eurytoma furva Bugbee, 1958
- Eurytoma fusca Bugbee, 1967
- Eurytoma fuscipennis (Girault, 1913)
- Eurytoma gahani Noble, 1939
- Eurytoma galeati Girault, 1916
- Eurytoma gallephedrae Askew, 1998
- Eurytoma gastra Narendran, 1994
- Eurytoma generalis Walker, 1874
- Eurytoma ghazvini Zerova, 2004
- Eurytoma ghilarovi Zerova, 1988
- Eurytoma gibsoni Narendran, 1994
- Eurytoma gigantea Walsh, 1870
- Eurytoma giraulti Grissell & Schauff, 1990
- Eurytoma globiventris Thomson, 1876
- Eurytoma goidanichi Boucek, 1970
- Eurytoma gracilior Dalla Torre, 1898
- Eurytoma gracilis Walker, 1832
- Eurytoma graminicola Zerova, 1981
- Eurytoma grata Zerova, 1995
- Eurytoma gregi Girault, 1915
- Eurytoma guianaensis Cameron, 1913
- Eurytoma haeckeli Girault, 1913
- Eurytoma hakonensis Ashmead, 1904
- Eurytoma hallami Girault, 1920
- Eurytoma harmoliticola Zerova, 1977
- Eurytoma hawthornei Girault, 1915
- Eurytoma hebes Bugbee, 1973
- Eurytoma hecale Walker, 1843
- Eurytoma helena Girault, 1933
- Eurytoma herbaria Zerova, 1994
- Eurytoma herbertonensis Girault, 1935
- Eurytoma heriadi Zerova, 1984
- Eurytoma hermonica Zerova, 2005
- Eurytoma herrerae (Ashmead, 1902)
- Eurytoma hiems Bugbee, 1945
- Eurytoma hindupurensis Gahan, 1919
- Eurytoma hirsuta Bugbee, 1941
- Eurytoma howardii Dalla Torre, 1898
- Eurytoma hybrida Zerova, 1978
- Eurytoma hypochoeridis Claridge, 1960
- Eurytoma ibaraca Zerova, 2006
- Eurytoma illinoisensis Girault, 1920
- Eurytoma imago Bugbee, 1945
- Eurytoma imminuta Bugbee, 1951
- Eurytoma incerta Fullaway, 1912
- Eurytoma inconspicua Girault, 1915
- Eurytoma indi Ayyar, 1920
- Eurytoma infracta Mayr, 1904
- Eurytoma ingens Bugbee, 1944
- Eurytoma iniqua Bugbee, 1951
- Eurytoma inornata Bugbee, 1962
- Eurytoma insignis Walker, 1871
- Eurytoma insularis Ashmead, 1894
- Eurytoma inulae Domenichini, 2002
- Eurytoma irakensis Abdul-Rassoul, 1990
- Eurytoma iranica Narendran & Lotfalizadeh, 1999
- Eurytoma istriana Schmidt, 1851
- Eurytoma ivohibei Risbec, 1957
- Eurytoma jaceae Mayr, 1878
- Eurytoma jaltica Zerova, 1994
- Eurytoma japonica Ashmead, 1904
- Eurytoma joanna Girault, 1935
- Eurytoma johnsoni Girault, 1925
- Eurytoma jozsefi Zerova, 1977
- Eurytoma juglansi Yang, 1996
- Eurytoma juncea Rondani, 1877
- Eurytoma juniperina Marcovitch, 1915
- Eurytoma kangasi Hedqvist, 1966
- Eurytoma karnatakensis Mukerjee, 1981
- Eurytoma kasaragodensis Mukerjee, 1981
- Eurytoma kashiensis Liao, 1979
- Eurytoma kemalpasensis Narendran, Tezcan & Civelek, 1995
- Eurytoma kondarica Zerova, 1994
- Eurytoma korneyevi Zerova, 1995
- Eurytoma krishtali Zerova, 1978
- Eurytoma kulamensis Narendran, 1994
- Eurytoma lactucae Bugbee, 1973
- Eurytoma lacunae Bugbee, 1967
- Eurytoma lamtoensis Rasplus, 1988
- Eurytoma laricis Yano, 1918
- Eurytoma larvicola Girault, 1925
- Eurytoma laserpitii Mayr, 1878
- Eurytoma lata Bugbee, 1945
- Eurytoma lathyri Zerova, 1979
- Eurytoma latrodecti Fullaway, 1953
- Eurytoma laxitas Bugbee, 1941
- Eurytoma leeuwenhoeki Girault, 1929
- Eurytoma leleyi Zerova, 1987
- Eurytoma lepidopterae Risbec, 1951
- Eurytoma leptovena Bugbee, 1941
- Eurytoma leuconeura Cameron, 1913
- Eurytoma leucoptera Walker, 1874
- Eurytoma levidensis Bugbee, 1945
- Eurytoma levivultus Bugbee, 1957
- Eurytoma levo Bugbee, 1967
- Eurytoma linariae Zerova, 1987
- Eurytoma lincolni Girault, 1913
- Eurytoma linearis Bugbee, 1945
- Eurytoma longavena Bugbee, 1951
- Eurytoma longicauda Yang, 1996
- Eurytoma longicornis Walker, 1874
- Eurytoma longipennis Walker, 1832
- Eurytoma longipetiolata Girault, 1915
- Eurytoma lucidula Zerova, 1995
- Eurytoma lutea Bugbee, 1967
- Eurytoma lycti Ashmead, 1894
- Eurytoma lyubae Zerova, 1995
- Eurytoma maculipes Motschulsky, 1863
- Eurytoma maculiventris Ashmead, 1894
- Eurytoma magdalidis Ashmead, 1894
- Eurytoma mali Bugbee, 1967
- Eurytoma mammae Bugbee, 1967
- Eurytoma mandrakae Risbec, 1952
- Eurytoma manilensis Ashmead, 1904
- Eurytoma manpurensis Mukerjee, 1981
- Eurytoma martellii Domenichini, 1960
- Eurytoma maslovskii Nikol'skaya, 1945
- Eurytoma mateui Hedqvist, 1967
- Eurytoma mayri Ashmead, 1887
- Eurytoma mazzinii Girault, 1913
- Eurytoma melanagromyzae Narendran, 1994
- Eurytoma melikai
- Eurytoma menon Walker, 1839
- Eurytoma microneura Ratzeburg, 1852
- Eurytoma mimosarum Rasplus, 1988
- Eurytoma minasensis De Santis & Fernandes, 1989
- Eurytoma minnesota Girault, 1916
- Eurytoma minutivespa Girault, 1929
- Eurytoma minutula Dalla Torre, 1898
- Eurytoma mitsukurii Ashmead, 1904
- Eurytoma monemae Ruschka, 1918
- Eurytoma mongolica Zerova, 1977
- Eurytoma monticola Zerova, 2005
- Eurytoma mordax Girault, 1915
- Eurytoma morio Boheman, 1836
- Eurytoma motleyi Girault, 1935
- Eurytoma mucronura Bugbee, 1941
- Eurytoma multipunctum Girault, 1915
- Eurytoma myartsevi Zerova, 1995
- Eurytoma nalanda Narendran, 1994
- Eurytoma nartshukae Zerova, 1977
- Eurytoma natalensis Cameron, 1907
- Eurytoma neesii Walker, 1852
- Eurytoma nelsonia Girault, 1915
- Eurytoma neocaraganae Liao, 1979
- Eurytoma neomexicana Girault, 1920
- Eurytoma neoverticillata Narendran, 1994
- Eurytoma nevadensis (Ashmead, 1894)
- Eurytoma nigra (Girault, 1914)
- Eurytoma nigricoxa Provancher, 1887
- Eurytoma nigripedicel Girault, 1925
- Eurytoma nigripes Girault, 1915
- Eurytoma nigrita Dalman, 1820
- Eurytoma nigroculex Girault, 1929
- Eurytoma nikkoensis Ashmead, 1904
- Eurytoma nikolskayae Zerova, 1989
- Eurytoma nippon Girault, 1916
- Eurytoma nochurae Zerova, 1995
- Eurytoma nodularis Boheman, 1836
- Eurytoma nodulosa Ratzeburg, 1848
- Eurytoma nova Zerova, 2001
- Eurytoma novalis Zerova, 1978
- Eurytoma nox Girault, 1928
- Eurytoma noxialis (Portschinsky, 1881)
- Eurytoma nympha (Girault, 1913)
- Eurytoma obesa Risbec, 1957
- Eurytoma obocki Risbec, 1955
- Eurytoma obscura Boheman, 1836
- Eurytoma obtusa Bugbee, 1967
- Eurytoma obtusilobae Ashmead, 1885
- Eurytoma obtusiventris Gahan, 1934
- Eurytoma ochraceipes Kalina, 1970
- Eurytoma olbus Walker, 1839
- Eurytoma oleae Silvestri, 1915
- Eurytoma oliphantis Hedqvist, 1976
- Eurytoma omnirubricornis (Girault, 1922)
- Eurytoma onobrychidis Nikol'skaya, 1933
- Eurytoma onobrycola Zerova, 1994
- Eurytoma oophaga Silvestri, 1920
- Eurytoma orbicaulis Bugbee, 1982
- Eurytoma orbiculata Say, 1836
- Eurytoma orchidearum (Westwood, 1869)
- Eurytoma orientalis Zerova, 1995
- Eurytoma orseoliphaga Delvare, 1988
- Eurytoma oryzivora Delvare, 1988
- Eurytoma pachyneuron Girault, 1916
- Eurytoma padi Vereshchagin, 1953
- Eurytoma palanichamyi (Narendran, 1984)
- Eurytoma pallidiceps Spinola, 1851
- Eurytoma palliditarsis Cameron, 1911
- Eurytoma pallustris Bugbee, 1982
- Eurytoma paracynipsea Zerova, 1998
- Eurytoma paraguayensis Girault, 1911
- Eurytoma paraliae Graham, 1984
- Eurytoma paramygdali Zerova & Fursov, 1991
- Eurytoma pareuphorbiae Zerova, 1994
- Eurytoma parva Phillips, 1918
- Eurytoma parvula Thomson, 1876
- Eurytoma pauliani Risbec, 1952
- Eurytoma pax Girault, 1913
- Eurytoma pediaspisi Pujade i Villar, 1994
- Eurytoma pedicellata Yang, 1996
- Eurytoma peethapada Narendran, 1994
- Eurytoma pentaspina Narendran, 1994
- Eurytoma penuria Bugbee, 1973
- Eurytoma peraffinis Ashmead, 1894
- Eurytoma perineti Risbec, 1952
- Eurytoma petioliventris Cameron, 1884
- Eurytoma petrosa Zerova, 1994
- Eurytoma phalaridis Graham, 1974
- Eurytoma philager (Walker, 1839)
- Eurytoma philorobinae Liao, 1979
- Eurytoma phloeotribi Ashmead, 1894
- Eurytoma phlomidis Zerova, 1978
- Eurytoma phragmiticola Zerova, 1978
- Eurytoma phytophaga Girault, 1919
- Eurytoma picea Bugbee, 1967
- Eurytoma picus Girault, 1914
- Eurytoma piezotracheli Rasplus, 1988
- Eurytoma pigra Burks, 1958
- Eurytoma pilicornis Cameron, 1905
- Eurytoma pineticola Zerova, 1981
- Eurytoma pinetorum Ratzeburg, 1852
- Eurytoma pini Bugbee, 1958
- Eurytoma pinisilvae Bugbee, 1981
- Eurytoma pissodis Girault, 1917
- Eurytoma pistaciae Rondani, 1877
- Eurytoma piurae Crawford, 1912
- Eurytoma plana Bugbee, 1944
- Eurytoma plectroniae Risbec, 1952
- Eurytoma pletiodropa Delvare, 1988
- Eurytoma plotnikovi Nikol'skaya, 1934
- Eurytoma poincarei Girault, 1913
- Eurytoma pollux Claridge, 1959
- Eurytoma poloni Girault, 1920
- Eurytoma polygraphi (Ashmead, 1894)
- Eurytoma poredipleta Delvare, 1988
- Eurytoma poroensis Mukerjee, 1981
- Eurytoma potentillae Zerova, 1995
- Eurytoma profunda Bugbee, 1967
- Eurytoma pruni Yang, 1996
- Eurytoma prunicola Walsh, 1870
- Eurytoma pseudocynipsea Zerova, 2003
- Eurytoma pseudononis Liao, 1979
- Eurytoma puella Girault, 1915
- Eurytoma punctatella Zerova, 1978
- Eurytoma punctatifossa Girault, 1925
- Eurytoma punctifronta Narendran, 1994
- Eurytoma punctigastra Narendran, 1994
- Eurytoma pusilla Bugbee, 1945
- Eurytoma pyrrhocera Crawford, 1911
- Eurytoma quadrata Bugbee, 1945
- Eurytoma quadrispina Narendran, 1994
- Eurytoma querceticola Zerova, 1995
- Eurytoma querciglobuli (Fitch, 1859)
- Eurytoma quercipisi (Fitch, 1859)
- Eurytoma quinquenotata Girault, 1915
- Eurytoma radhakrishnani Narendran, 1994
- Eurytoma radicicola Risbec, 1952
- Eurytoma rajeevi Narendran, 1994
- Eurytoma ramdasi Narendran, 1994
- Eurytoma ranjithi Narendran, 1994
- Eurytoma raoi Narendran, 1994
- Eurytoma regiae Yang, 1996
- Eurytoma reunionensis Risbec, 1957
- Eurytoma rhois Crosby, 1909
- Eurytoma risa Narendran, 1994
- Eurytoma risbecomaphaga Rasplus, 1988
- Eurytoma robusta Mayr, 1878
- Eurytoma rosae Nees, 1834
- Eurytoma roseni Claridge, 1959
- Eurytoma rubribacca Bugbee, 1968
- Eurytoma rubrigalla Bugbee, 1968
- Eurytoma rubriventris Girault & Dodd, 1915
- Eurytoma rufa Zerova, 1970
- Eurytoma ruficornis Yang, 1996
- Eurytoma rufipes Walker, 1832
- Eurytoma rufitarsus Walker, 1834
- Eurytoma sabiae Mani, 1969
- Eurytoma saccharicola (Mani, 1941)
- Eurytoma saharensis Hedqvist, 1967
- Eurytoma salicigalla Bugbee, 1970
- Eurytoma salicis Walker, 1834
- Eurytoma salicisaquatica Bugbee, 1970
- Eurytoma salsa Zerova, 1995
- Eurytoma saltinata Girault, 1927
- Eurytoma salvicola Zerova, 2003
- Eurytoma samsonowi Vassiliev, 1915
- Eurytoma sarcophaga Girault, 1915
- Eurytoma saussureae Zerova, 1995
- Eurytoma scabritigera Bugbee, 1982
- Eurytoma scalaris Graham, 1984
- Eurytoma scaposa Narendran, 1994
- Eurytoma schaeferi Yasumatsu & Kamijo, 1979
- Eurytoma schreineri Schreiner, 1908
- Eurytoma sciromatis Bugbee, 1962
- Eurytoma scolyti Yang, 1996
- Eurytoma scrobata Narendran, 1994
- Eurytoma scrophulariae Zerova, 1981
- Eurytoma sculptura Girault, 1915
- Eurytoma semicircula Bugbee, 1967
- Eurytoma semifuscicornis Girault, 1915
- Eurytoma seminigrifemur Girault, 1935
- Eurytoma seminis Bugbee, 1941
- Eurytoma semivenae Bugbee, 1957
- Eurytoma senegalensis Risbec, 1951
- Eurytoma sepulta Brues, 1910
- Eurytoma sequax Brues, 1910
- Eurytoma serratulae (Fabricius, 1798)
- Eurytoma setitibia Gahan, 1919
- Eurytoma sheelae Narendran, 1994
- Eurytoma shyamagatra Narendran, 1994
- Eurytoma siamense Zerova, 1995
- Eurytoma silvae Girault, 1915
- Eurytoma silvipuer Girault, 1927
- Eurytoma similis Narendran, 1994
- Eurytoma sivinskii Gates & Grissell, 2004
- Eurytoma solenozopheriae Ashmead, 1887
- Eurytoma spadix Bugbee, 1945
- Eurytoma speciosa Girault, 1915
- Eurytoma spermophaga Silvestri, 1915
- Eurytoma spes Girault, 1915
- Eurytoma sphaera Bugbee, 1967
- Eurytoma sphegum (Fabricius, 1787)
- Eurytoma spicula Zerova, 2005
- Eurytoma spina Bugbee, 1951
- Eurytoma spinipes Kalina, 1970
- Eurytoma spongiosa Bugbee, 1951
- Eurytoma squamea Walker, 1834
- Eurytoma squamosa Bugbee, 1967
- Eurytoma steffani Claridge, 1959
- Eurytoma stegmaieri Bugbee, 1975
- Eurytoma stenostigma Thomson, 1876
- Eurytoma stepicola Zerova, 1978
- Eurytoma stepposa Zerova, 1980
- Eurytoma stigmi Ashmead, 1895
- Eurytoma striatifacies Girault, 1925
- Eurytoma striatigena Kieffer, 1910
- Eurytoma striatula Cameron, 1905
- Eurytoma strigifrons Thomson, 1876
- Eurytoma strigosa Bugbee, 1982
- Eurytoma striolata Ratzeburg, 1848
- Eurytoma studiosa Say, 1836
- Eurytoma subfusca Bugbee, 1945
- Eurytoma subsanguinea Girault, 1926
- Eurytoma sulcata Kieffer, 1905
- Eurytoma swezeyi Fullaway, 1953
- Eurytoma systoloides Crawford, 1910
- Eurytoma tanjorensis Narendran, 1994
- Eurytoma tapio Claridge, 1959
- Eurytoma tatipakensis Chandy Kurian, 1954
- Eurytoma tavolae Risbec, 1952
- Eurytoma tellis Walker, 1839
- Eurytoma tenebrica Crosby, 1909
- Eurytoma tenuis Bugbee, 1941
- Eurytoma tephritidis Fullaway, 1953
- Eurytoma tepicensis Ashmead, 1895
- Eurytoma terebinthi Rondani, 1877
- Eurytoma terrea Bugbee, 1951
- Eurytoma tessariae Kieffer, 1910
- Eurytoma tilicola Hedqvist, 1966
- Eurytoma tinctipennis Cameron, 1911
- Eurytoma toddaliae Risbec, 1952
- Eurytoma tolidepepra Delvare, 1988
- Eurytoma tomici Ashmead, 1894
- Eurytoma transvaalensis Cameron, 1911
- Eurytoma transversa Zerova, 2005
- Eurytoma tricoloripes Girault, 1915
- Eurytoma trogocarpi (De Stefani, 1908)
- Eurytoma tropicana Risbec, 1953
- Eurytoma truncata Boheman, 1836
- Eurytoma truncatella Zerova, 1978
- Eurytoma trypeticola Zerova, 1978
- Eurytoma tumida Walker, 1844
- Eurytoma tumoris Bugbee, 1962
- Eurytoma tuomurensis Liao, 1985
- Eurytoma turkestanica Zerova & Fursov, 1991
- Eurytoma turkezia Zerova & Cam, 2003
- Eurytoma turkomanica Zerova, 1995
- Eurytoma tylodermatis Ashmead, 1896
- Eurytoma udara Narendran, 1994
- Eurytoma undata Bugbee, 1941
- Eurytoma unicolor Zerova, 1978
- Eurytoma ussuriensis Zerova, 1995
- Eurytoma vadosa Bugbee, 1945
- Eurytoma varicolor Silvestri, 1915
- Eurytoma varivena Girault, 1929
- Eurytoma venula Bugbee, 1945
- Eurytoma vernonia Bugbee, 1967
- Eurytoma verticillata (Fabricius, 1798)
- Eurytoma vitis (Saunders, 1869)
- Eurytoma volkovi Zerova, 1994
- Eurytoma wachtli Mayr, 1878
- Eurytoma walshi Howard, 1897
- Eurytoma werauhia Gates, 2004
- Eurytoma xantherella Girault, 1915
- Eurytoma xanthopus Cameron, 1905
- Eurytoma xinganensis Yang, 1996
- Eurytoma xylophaga Yang, 1996
- Eurytoma yagii Ishii, 1938
- Eurytoma yunnanensis Yang, 1996
- Eurytoma zykovi Zerova, 1995
