= Plutarchia =

Plutarchia may refer to:

- Plutarchia (wasp), a genus of wasps in the family Eurytomidae
- Plutarchia (plant), a genus of plants in the family Ericaceae
- Plutarchia, a genus of mites in the family Syringobiidae, synonym of Plutarchusia
