= Tetramesa romana =

Scientific classification
- Kingdom: Animalia
- Phylum: Arthropoda
- Clade: Pancrustacea
- Class: Insecta
- Order: Hymenoptera
- Family: Eurytomidae
- Genus: Tetramesa
- Species: T. romana

Binomial name
- Tetramesa romana Walker 1873

Species of wasp

Tetramesa romana, commonly known as the arundo wasp, is a species of wasp native to France and Spain. As its common name implies, the species feeds on Arundo grass. These wasps have been imported to North America in biological control efforts surrounding Arundo donax, but their efficacy has been disputed. The species reproduces parthenogenically, with females laying eggs into the stems, resulting in developing larvae forming stem galls.
