= Arundo donax =

Conservation status
- Least Concern (IUCN 3.1)

Scientific classification
- Kingdom: Plantae
- Clade: Tracheophytes
- Clade: Angiosperms
- Clade: Monocots
- Clade: Commelinids
- Order: Poales
- Family: Poaceae
- Genus: Arundo
- Species: A. donax

Binomial name
- Arundo donax L.

Synonyms
- List: Aira bengalensis (Retz.) J.F.Gmel.; Arundo aegyptia Delile; Arundo aegyptiaca E.Vilm.; Arundo bambusifolia Hook.f.; Arundo bengalensis Retz.; Arundo bifaria Retz.; Arundo coleotricha (Hack.) Honda; Arundo donax var. angustifolia Döll; Arundo donax var. lanceolata Döll; Arundo donax var. versicolor (Mill.) Stokes; Arundo donax f. versicolor (Mill.) Beetle; Arundo glauca Bubani; Arundo latifolia Salisb.; Arundo sativa Lam.; Arundo scriptoria L.; Arundo triflora Roxb.; Arundo versicolor Mill.; Cynodon donax (L.) Raspail; Donax arundinaceus P.Beauv.; Donax bengalensis (Retz.) P.Beauv.; Donax donax (L.) Asch. & Graebn.; Donax sativus C.Presl; Donax versicolor (Mill.) P.Beauv.; Scolochloa arundinacea (P.Beauv.) Mert. & W.D.J.Koch; Scolochloa donax (L.) Gaudin

Species of plant

Arundo donax, the giant reed, is a tall perennial reed or cane species. Other vernacular names include giant cane, Spanish cane, wild cane, and in Spanish, carrizo. The scientific name Arundo and donax are respectively the old Latin and Greek names for reed.

Arundo donax grows in damp soils, either fresh or moderately saline, and is native to the eastern Mediterranean region and across southern Asia to Japan. It has been widely planted and naturalised in the mild temperate, subtropical and tropical regions of both hemispheres, especially in the Mediterranean, California, the western Pacific and the Caribbean and is considered invasive in North America and Oceania. It forms dense stands on disturbed sites, sand dunes, in wetlands and riparian habitats.

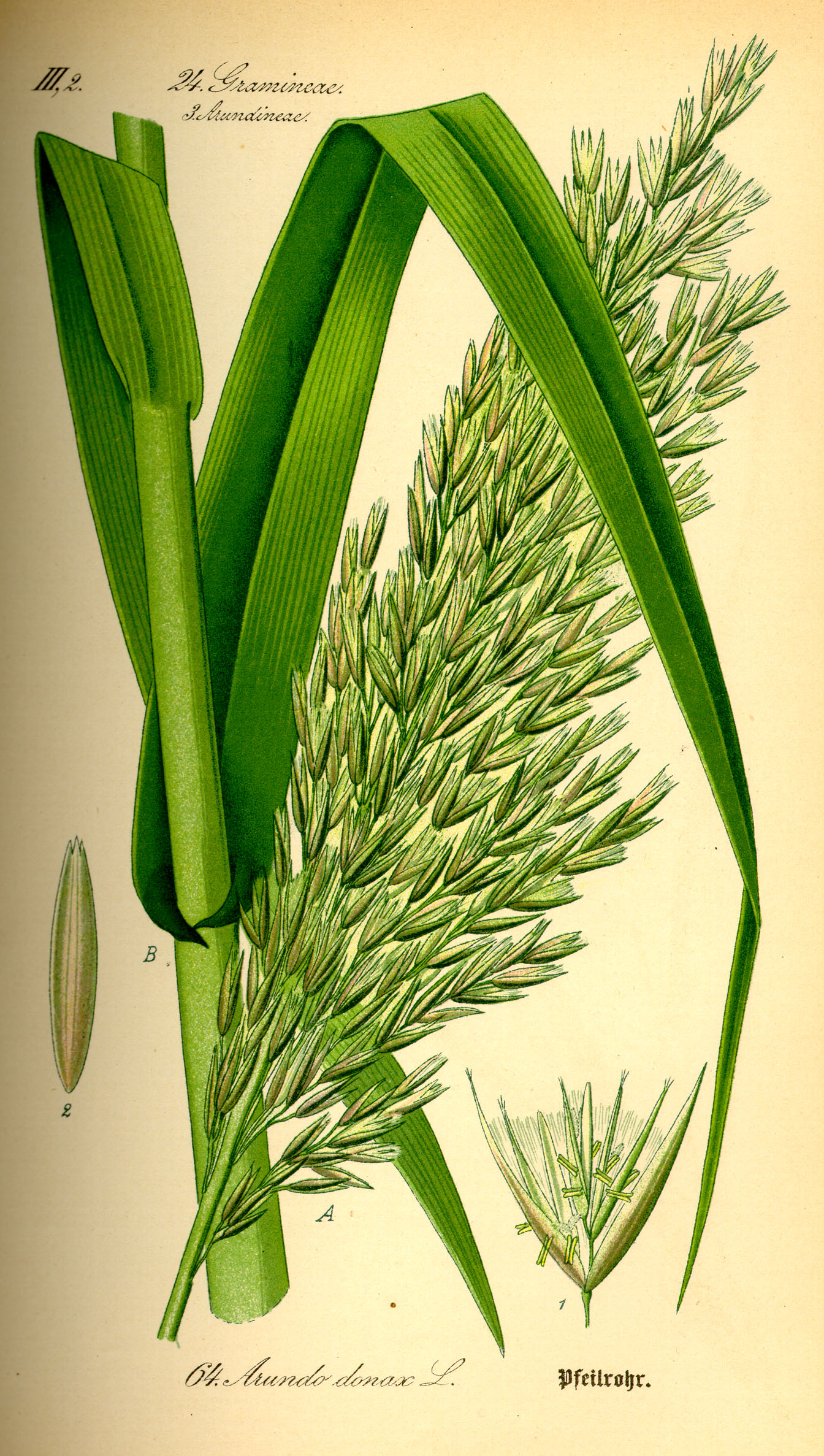
Arundo donax

== Description ==
Arundo donax generally grows to 6 metres (20 ft) in height (in ideal conditions can exceed 10 metres (33 ft)). The hollow stems are 1 to 3 centimetres (0.39 to 1.18 in) in diameter, either unbranched or with small bamboo-like side shoots. The grey-green swordlike leaves are alternate, 30 to 60 centimetres (12 to 24 in) long and 2 to 6 centimetres (0.79 to 2.36 in) wide with a tapered tip, and have a hairy tuft at the base. Overall, the plant resembles an outsize common reed (Phragmites australis) or a bamboo (Poaceae subfamily Bambusoideae).

It flowers in late summer, bearing upright, white feathery plumes 30 to 60 centimetres (12 to 24 in) long, that are usually seedless or with seeds that are rarely fertile. Instead, it mostly reproduces vegetatively by tough, fibrous underground rhizomes that form knotty, spreading mats which penetrate deep into the soil, up to 1 metre (3.3 ft) deep. Stem and rhizome pieces less than 5 centimetres (2.0 in) long and containing a single node could sprout readily under a variety of conditions. This vegetative propagation appears well adapted to floods, which may break up individual A. donax clumps, spreading the pieces, which may sprout and colonise downstream.

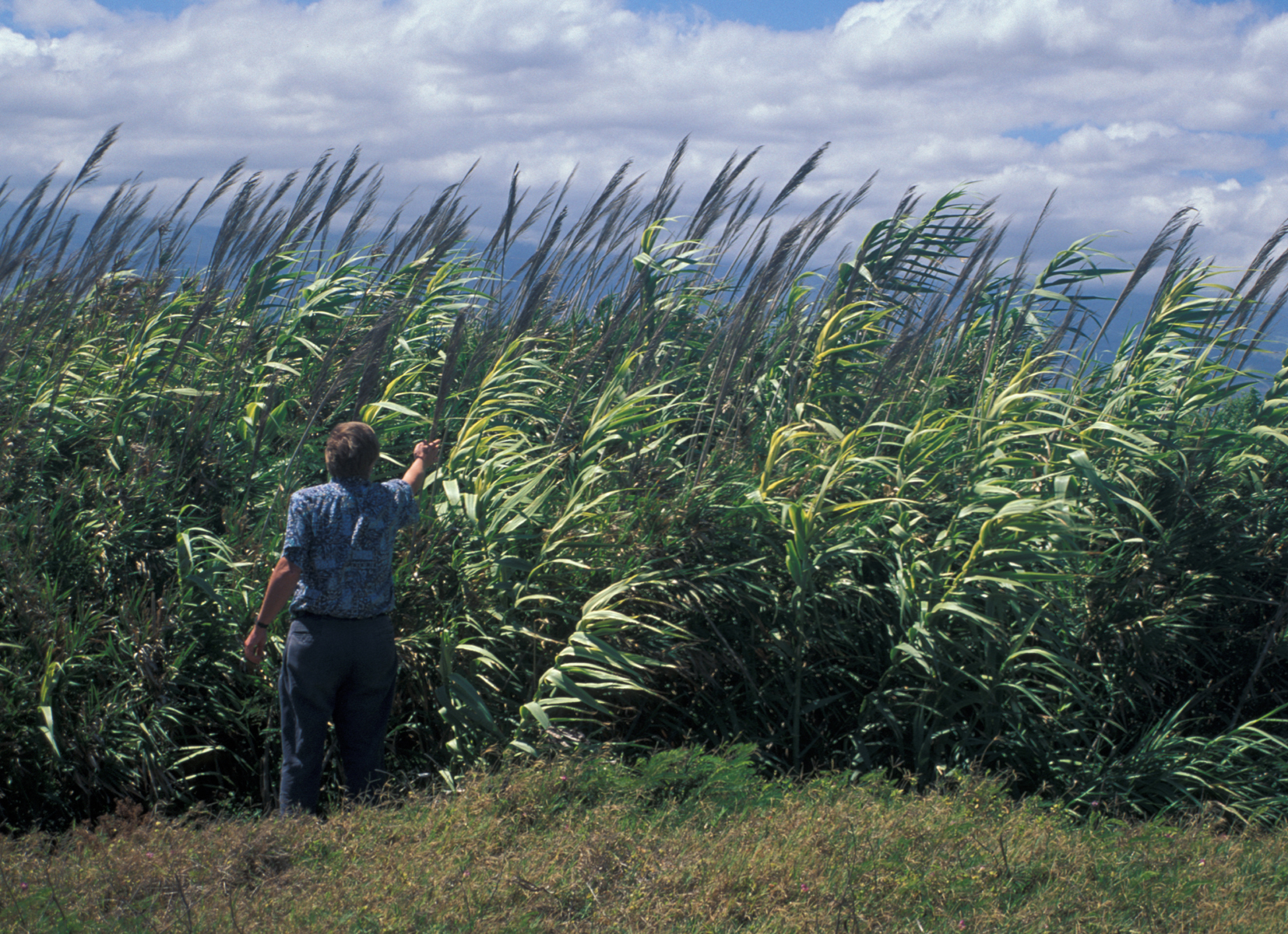

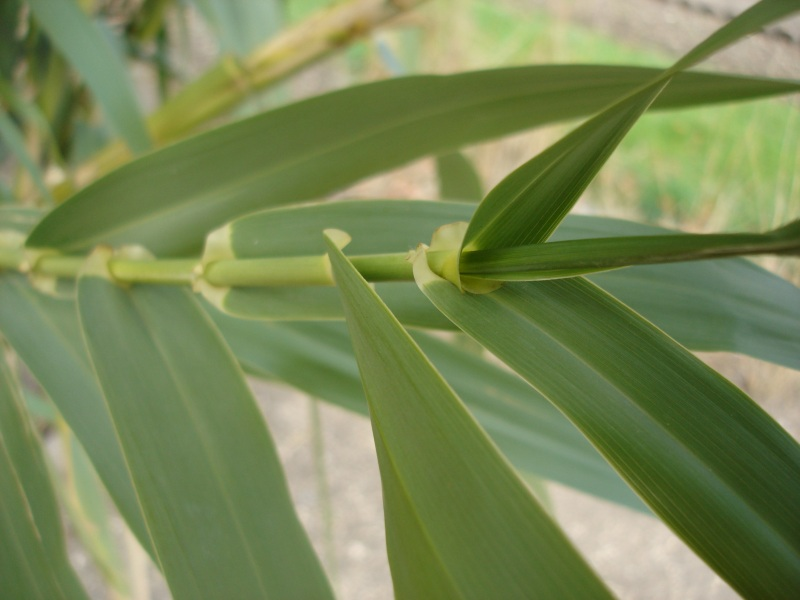

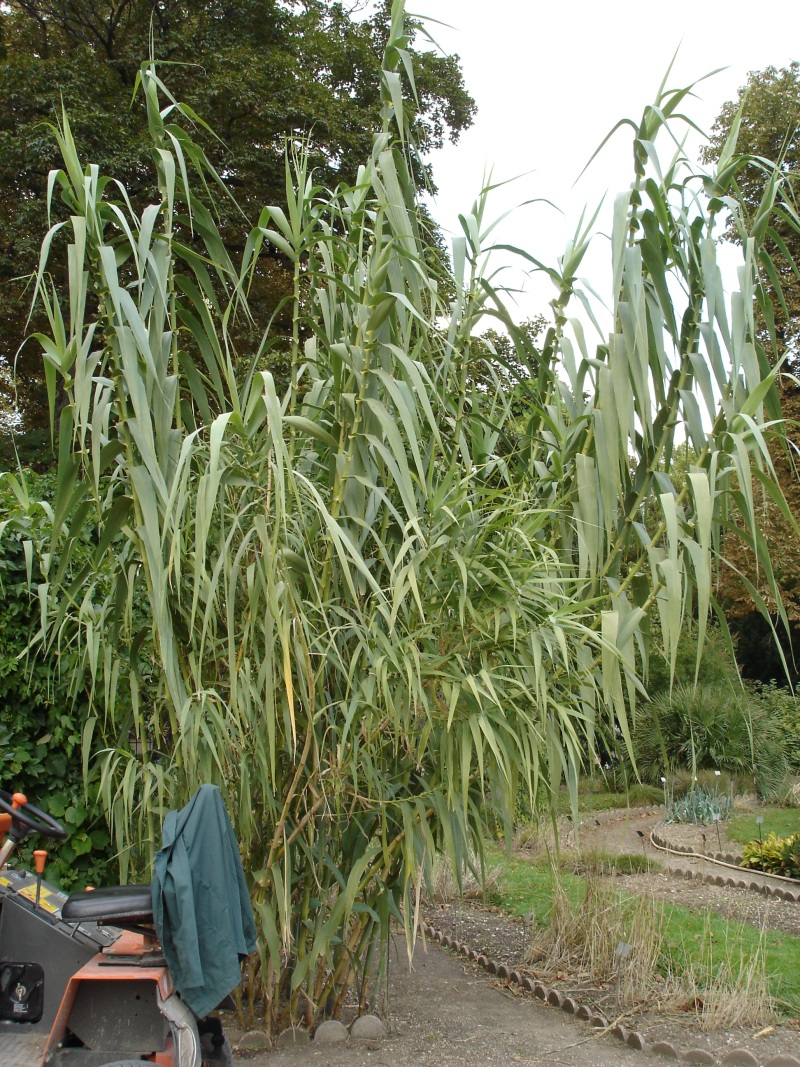

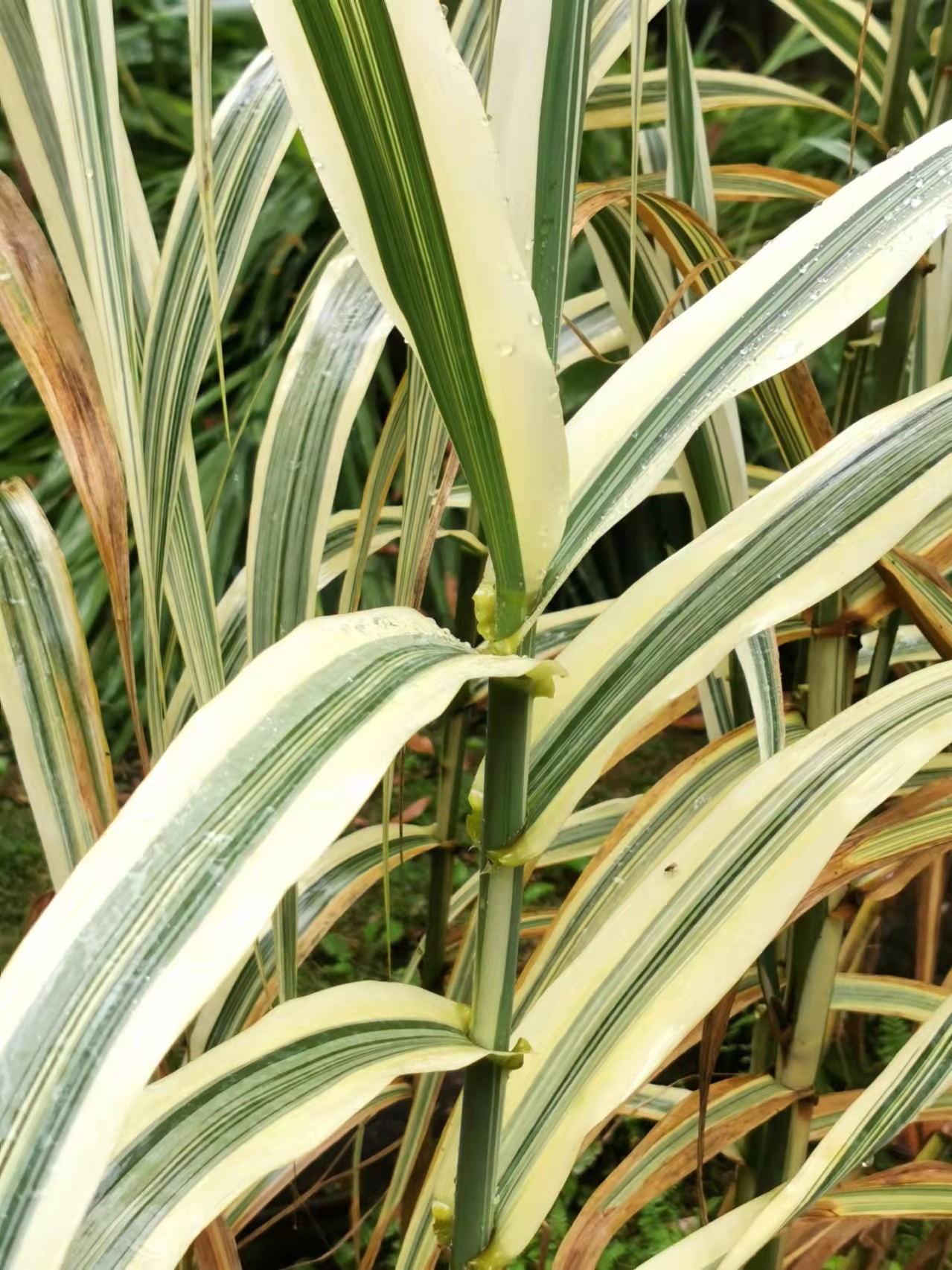
The variegated cultivar A. donax 'Versicolor'

== Biology ==
Arundo donax is a tall, perennial grass in the subfamily Arundinoideae, characterised by C3 photosynthesis. The stems produced during the first growing season are unbranched and photosynthetic. In the Mediterranean, where a temperate climate is characterised by warm and dry summer and mild winter, new shoots of giant reed emerge around March, growing rapidly in June and July and producing stems and leaves. From late July the lower leaves start to dry, depending on seasonal temperature patterns. Drying accelerates during autumn when anthesis occurs from the beginning of October to the end of November. In this phenological stage moisture content falls significantly. In the low temperatures of winter giant reed stops its growth; regrowth occurs in springtime. Giant reed behaves as an annual in Central Europe where soil temperatures are low, due to poor freeze tolerance of the rhizomes.

The minimum growth temperature reported for giant reed is 7 °C (45 °F), with a maximum temperature of 30 °C (86 °F). It has a high photosynthetic capacity, associated with absence of light saturation. Carbon dioxide exchange rates are high compared to other C_{3} and C_{4} species; maximum CO_{2} uptake ranged from 19.8 to 36.7 μmol/s·m^{2} under natural conditions, depending on irradiance and leaf age. Carbon dioxide exchange is regulated by leaf conductance.

Studies have found this plant to be rich in active tryptamine compounds, but there are more indications of the plants in India having these compounds than in the United States. Toxins such as bufotenidine and gramine have also been found.

The dried rhizome with the stem removed has been found to contain 0.0057% DMT, 0.026% bufotenine, 0.0023% 5-MeO-MMT. The flowers are also known to have DMT and the 5-methoxylated N-demethylated analogue, also 5-MeO-NMT. The quite toxic quaternary methylated salt of DMT, bufotenidine, has been found in the flowers, and the cyclic dehydrobufotenidine has been found in the roots. A. donax is also known to release volatile organic compounds (VOCs), mainly isoprene.

== Genetic background ==
In some areas where giant reed grows (including the Mediterranean area and the United States), viable seeds are not produced. It is reported that sterility of giant reed results from failure of the megaspore mother cell to divide. This sterility, which drastically limits genetic variability, is an obstacle for breeding programs which aim to increase the productivity and biomass quality for energy conversion. A total of 185 clones of A. donax were collected from California to South Carolina and genetically fingerprinted with the SRAP and TE-based markers. Giant reed exhibited no molecular genetic variation despite the wide genomic coverage of the markers used in this study. The molecular data strongly point to a single genetic clone of A. donax in the United States, although multiple introductions of this plant into the United States have been documented. Another study conducted in the Mediterranean area sampled giant reed from 80 different sites, and demonstrated low gene diversity in this region as well. Results indicate the occurrence of post-meiotic alterations in the ovule and pollen developmental pathway. AFLP data support a monophyletic origin of giant reed and suggest that it originated in Asia, spreading from there into the Mediterranean Basin.

== Ecology ==
Giant reed is adapted to a wide variety of ecological conditions, but is generally associated with riparian and wetland systems. It is distributed across the southern United States from Maryland to California. Plants can grow in a variety of soils, from heavy clays to loose sands and gravelly soils, but prefer wet drained soils, where they produce dense monotypic stands.

=== Invasiveness and management ===
Arundo is a highly invasive plant in southwestern North American rivers, and its promotion as a biofuel in other regions is of great concern to environmental scientists and land managers. Arundo donax was introduced from the Mediterranean to California in the 1820s for roofing material and erosion control in drainage canals in the Los Angeles area. Through spread and subsequent plantings as an ornamental plant, and for use as reeds in woodwind instruments, it has become naturalised throughout warm coastal freshwaters of North America, and its range continues to spread.

It has also been planted widely through South America and Australasia and in New Zealand it is listed under the National Pest Plant Accord as an "unwanted organism". Despite its invasive characteristics in regions around the world where it is not native, Arundo is being promoted by the energy industry as a bio-fuel crop. Some of the regions, such as the southeastern United States have natural disturbances, such as hurricanes and floods, that could widely disperse this plant.

It is among the fastest-growing terrestrial plants in the world (nearly 10 centimetres (3.9 in) per day). To present knowledge, Arundo does not provide any food sources or nesting habitats for wildlife. Replacement of native plant communities by Arundo results in low-quality habitat and altered ecosystem functioning. For example, it damages California's riparian ecosystems by outcompeting native species, such as willows, for water. A. donax stems and leaves contain a variety of harmful chemicals, including silica and various alkaloids, which protect it from most insect herbivores and deter wildlife from feeding on it. Grazing animals such as cattle, sheep, and goats may have some effect on it, but are unlikely to be useful in keeping it under control.

Arundo donax appears to be highly adapted to fires. It is highly flammable throughout the year, and during the drier months of the year (July to October), it can increase the probability, intensity, and spread of wildfires through the riparian environment, changing the communities from flood-defined to fire-defined communities. After fires, A. donax rhizomes can resprout quickly, outgrowing native plants, which can result in large stands of A. donax along riparian corridors. Fire events thus push the system further toward mono-specific stands of A. donax.

A waterside plant community dominated by A. donax may also have reduced canopy shading of the in-stream habitat, which may result in increased water temperatures. This may lead to decreased oxygen concentrations and lower diversity of aquatic animals.

As the impact of Arundo donax increased in the environment and native species various efforts have been taken to reduce its population. It has few natural enemies in its introduced range. Several Mediterranean insects have been imported into the United States as biological control agents. The Arundo wasp, Tetramesa romana, the Arundo scale insect, Rhizaspidiotus donacis, and the Arundo fly, Cryptonevra are known to have some effect in damaging the plant. Tetramesa romana and more recently Rhizaspidiotus donacisis were registered in the US as biological control agents.

Other remedies like using mechanical force have also been employed, since outside its native range Arundo donax does not reproduce by seeds, so removing its root structure can be effective at controlling it. Preventing it from getting sunlight will deplete the plant of its resources and eventually kill it. Systemic herbicides and glyphosate are also used as chemical remedies.

The US Department of Homeland Security considers this plant invasive and in 2007 began researching biological controls. In 2015, Texas Senator Carlos Uresti passed legislation to create a program to eradicate Arundo donax using herbicides and the Arundo wasp.

In New Zealand's northernmost region, Arundo donax crowds out native plants, reduces wildlife habitat, contributes to higher fire frequency and intensity, and modifies river hydrology.

== Uses ==
=== Energy crop ===
Energy crops are plants which are produced with the express purpose of using their biomass energetically and at the same time reduce carbon dioxide emission. Biofuels derived from lignocellulosic plant material represent an important renewable energy alternative to transportation fossil fuels. Perennial rhizomatous grasses display several positive attributes as energy crops because of their high productivity, low (no) demand for nutrient inputs consequent to the recycling of nutrients by their rhizomes, exceptional soil carbon sequestration (4 times more than switchgrass), multiple products, adaptation to saline soils and saline water, and resistance to biotic and abiotic stresses.

Giant reed is one of the most promising crops for energy production in the Mediterranean climate of Europe and Africa, where it has shown advantages as an indigenous crop (already adapted to the environment), durable yields, and resistant to long drought periods. Several field studies have highlighted the beneficial effect of giant reed crop on the environment due to its minimal soil tillage, fertiliser and pesticide needs. Furthermore, it offers protection against soil erosion, one of the most important land degradation processes in Mediterranean and US environments. A. donax bioenergy feedstock has an impressive potential for several conversion processes. Dried biomass has a direct combustion high heating value of 19,000 kJ/kg (8,000 BTU/lb). In Italy, Arundo donax was used in one instance from 1937 to 1962 on a large-scale industrial basis for paper and dissolving pulp. This interest was stimulated primarily by the desire of the Mussolini dictatorship, just before World War II, to be independent of foreign sources of textile fibres and the desire for an export product. According to historical records made by Snia Viscosa, giant reed was established on 6,300 ha in Torviscosa (Udine), reaching the average annual production of 35 t/ha. Today several screening studies on energy crops have been carried out by several universities in the US as well as in EU to evaluate and identify best management practices for maximising biomass yields and assess environmental impacts.

=== Cultivation ===
Establishment is a critical point of cultivation. The Stem and rhizome have a great ability to sprout after removal from mother plant and both can be used for clonal propagation. The use of rhizomes was found to be the better propagation method for this species, achieving better survival rate. In this field study, it was noticed how the lowest density (12,500 rhizomes/ha) resulted in taller and thicker plants compared to denser plantation (25,000 rhizomes/ha). Seedbed preparation is conducted in the spring, immediately before planting, by a pass with a double-disk harrowing and a pass with a field cultivator. Giant reed has the possibility of adopting low plant density. The rhizomes were planted at 10–20 centimetres (3.9–7.9 in) of soil depth, with a minimum plant density of 10,000 plants per ha), while mature stems, with two or more nodes, can be planted 10–15 centimetres (3.9–5.9 in) deep. In order to ensure good root stand and adequate contact with the soil, sufficient moisture is needed immediately after planting. Pre-plant fertiliser is distributed according to the initial soil fertility, but usually an application of P at a rate of 80–100 kilograms (180–220 lb)/ha is applied.

A. donax maintains a high productive aptitude without irrigation under semi-arid climate conditions. In Southern Italy, a trial was carried out testing the yields performance of 39 genotypes, and an average yields of 22.1 t/ha dry matter in the second year were reached, a comparable result with others results obtained in Spain (22.5 t/ha) as well as in South Greece (19.0 t/ha). Several reports underlined that it is more economical to grow giant reed under moderate irrigation.

In order to evaluate different management practices, nitrogen fertiliser and input demand was evaluated in a 6-year field study conducted at the University of Pisa. Fertiliser enhanced the productive capacity in the initial years, but as the years go by and as the radical apparatus progressively deepens, the differences due to fertiliser decrease until disappearing. Harvest time and plant density were found to not affect the biomass yields.

Due to its high growth rate and superior resource-capture capacity (light, water and nutrients), A. donax is not affected by weed competition from the second year. An application of post-emergence treatment is usually recommended. Giant reed has few known diseases or insect pests, but in intensive cultivation, no pesticides are used.

To remove giant reed at the end of the crop cycle, there are mainly two methods: mechanical or chemical. An excavator can be useful to dig out the rhizomes or alternatively a single late-season application of 3% glyphosate onto the foliar mass is efficient and effective with least hazard to other biota. Glyphosate was selected as the most appropriate product for specific considerations on efficacy, environmental safety, soil residual activity, operator safety, application timing, and cost-effectiveness. However, glyphosate is only effective in autumn when plants are actively transporting nutrients to the root zone, and multiple retreatments are usually needed. Other herbicides registered for aquatic use can be very effective in controlling Arundo at other times of the year.

=== Biofuel ===
Arundo donax is a strong candidate for use as a renewable biofuel source because of its fast growth rate and its ability to grow in different soil types and climatic conditions. A. donax will produce an average of three kilograms of biomass per square metre (12 tons per acre/year) once established. The total energy input needed for the growing of one ha increases from not fertilised (4 GJ ha−1) to fertilised (18 GJ ha−1) crops, while the maximum energy yield output was 496 GJ ha−1, obtained with 20,000 plants per ha and fertilisation; fertilisation brought a 15% increase in biomass. The biomass calorific mean value (technically, the calorific value obtained from combustion of biomass sample in an adiabatic system) of Giant reed is about 17 MJ kg−1 dry matter regardless of fertiliser usage.

Studies in the European Union have identified A. donax as the most productive and lowest impact of all energy biomass crops (see FAIR REPORT E.U. 2004). Its ability to grow for 20 to 25 years without replanting is also significant. In the UK it is considered suitable for planting in and around water areas.

Arundo donax grown in Australia was demonstrated as potential feedstock for producing advanced biofuels through hydrothermal liquefaction.

Outside its native range, the interest as a biofuel crop needs to be balanced against its major invasive potential.

=== Carbon sequestration ===
An increased environmental concern is the health of soil system as one of the main factors affecting quality and productivity of agroecosystems. Around the world, several regions are subjected to a decline of fertility due to an increasing degradation of soils, loss of organic matter and increasing desertification. Recently research was carried out to evaluate, in the same pedological and climatic conditions, the impact of three long-term (14 years) agricultural systems, continuous giant reed, natural grassland, and cropping sequence, on the organic-matter characteristics and microbial biomass size in soil. The study pointed out that a long term Giant reed cropping system, characterised by low tillage intensity, positively affect the amount and quality of soil organic matter. Arundo donax showed greater values than tilled management system for total soil organic carbon, light fraction carbon, dissolved organic carbon, and microbial biomass carbon. Regarding the humification parameters, there were noticed any statistically differences between giant reed and a cropping sequence (cereals-legumes cultivated conventionally).

=== Ethnobotany ===
Arundo donax has been cultivated throughout Asia, southern Europe, northern Africa, and the Middle East for thousands of years. Ancient Egyptians wrapped their dead in the leaves. The canes contain silica, perhaps the reason for their durability, and have been used to make fishing rods and walking sticks. In Mauritius, where Arundo is called "fatax", the stems are traditionally used to make brooms. Its stiff stems are also used as support for climbing plants or for vines.

This plant may have been used in combination with harmal (Peganum harmala) to create a brew similar to the South American ayahuasca, and may trace its roots to the Soma of lore.

=== Construction ===
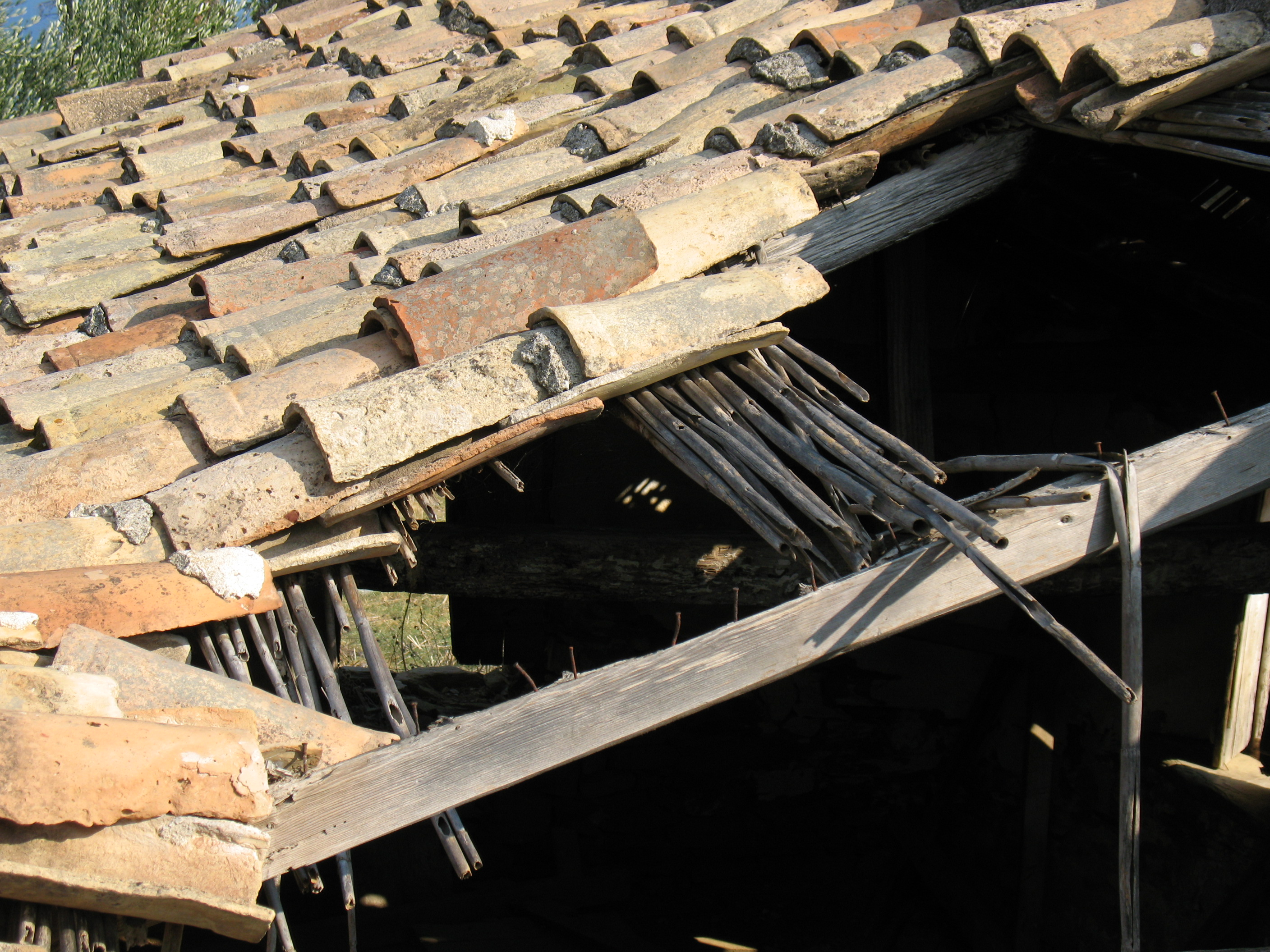
Construction of a roof using reeds

Mature reeds are used in construction as raw material, given their excellent properties and tubular shape. Its resemblance to bamboo permits their combination in buildings, though Arundo is more flexible.

In rural regions of Spain, for centuries there has existed a technique named cañizo, consisting of rectangles of approximately 2 by 1 metres of woven reeds to which clay or plaster could be applied. A properly insulated cañizo in a roof could keep its mechanical properties for over 60 years. Its high silicon content allows the cane to keep its qualities through time. Its low weight, flexibility, good adherence of the cañizo fabric and low price of the raw material have been the main reasons that this technique has been used. However, in the last decades, the rural migration from the countryside to urban centres and the extensive exploitation of land has reduced its use.

Recently, initiatives are being taken to recover the use of this material, combining ancient techniques from southern Iraq mudhif (reed houses) with new materials.

Diverse associations and collectives, such as CanyaViva, are pioneering in the research in combination with Spanish universities.

=== Musical instruments ===
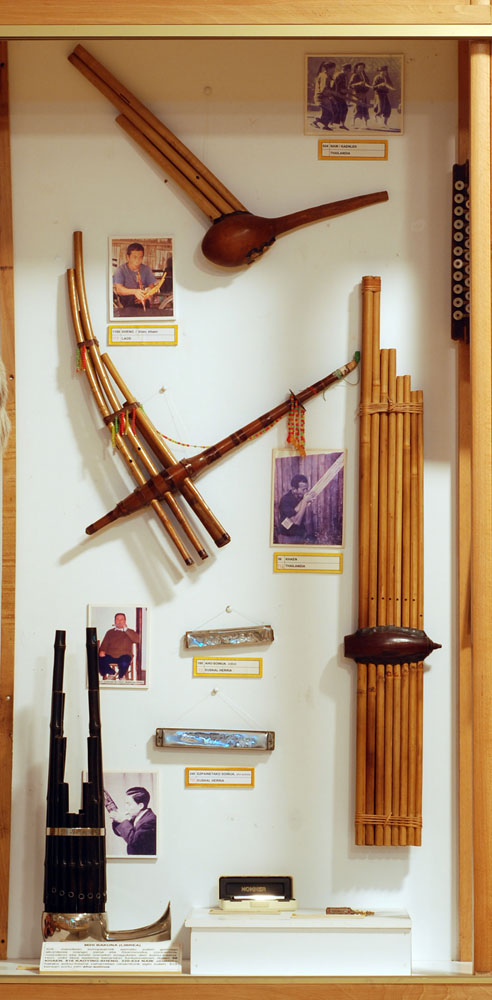
Sets of free reed aerophones

Ancient Greeks used cane to make flutes, known as kalamaulos, from kalamos ("cane") + aulos ("flute"). At the time, the best cane for flutes came from the banks of river Cephissus, in Attica, Greece. Several kalamauloi tuned differently and tied together, made a syrinx. Giant reed has been used to make flutes for over 5,000 years. The pan pipes consist of ten or more pipes made from the cane. The ancient end-blown flute ney is made from the same reeds.

A. donax is still the principal source material of reed makers for clarinets, saxophones, oboes, bassoons, bagpipes, and other woodwind instruments. The Var country in southern France contains the best-known supply of instrument reeds.

=== Other uses ===
When young, A. donax is readily browsed by ruminants, but it becomes unpalatable when maturing. A. donax has also been used in constructed wetlands for wastewater treatment.
