= Eurytoma tylodermatis =

Scientific classification
- Domain: Eukaryota
- Kingdom: Animalia
- Phylum: Arthropoda
- Class: Insecta
- Order: Hymenoptera
- Family: Eurytomidae
- Genus: Eurytoma
- Species: E. tylodermatis

Binomial name
- Eurytoma tylodermatis Ashmead, 1896

Species of wasp

Eurytoma tylodermatis is a species of chalcid wasp in the family Eurytomidae. It is a generalist parasite with over 56 host species.
