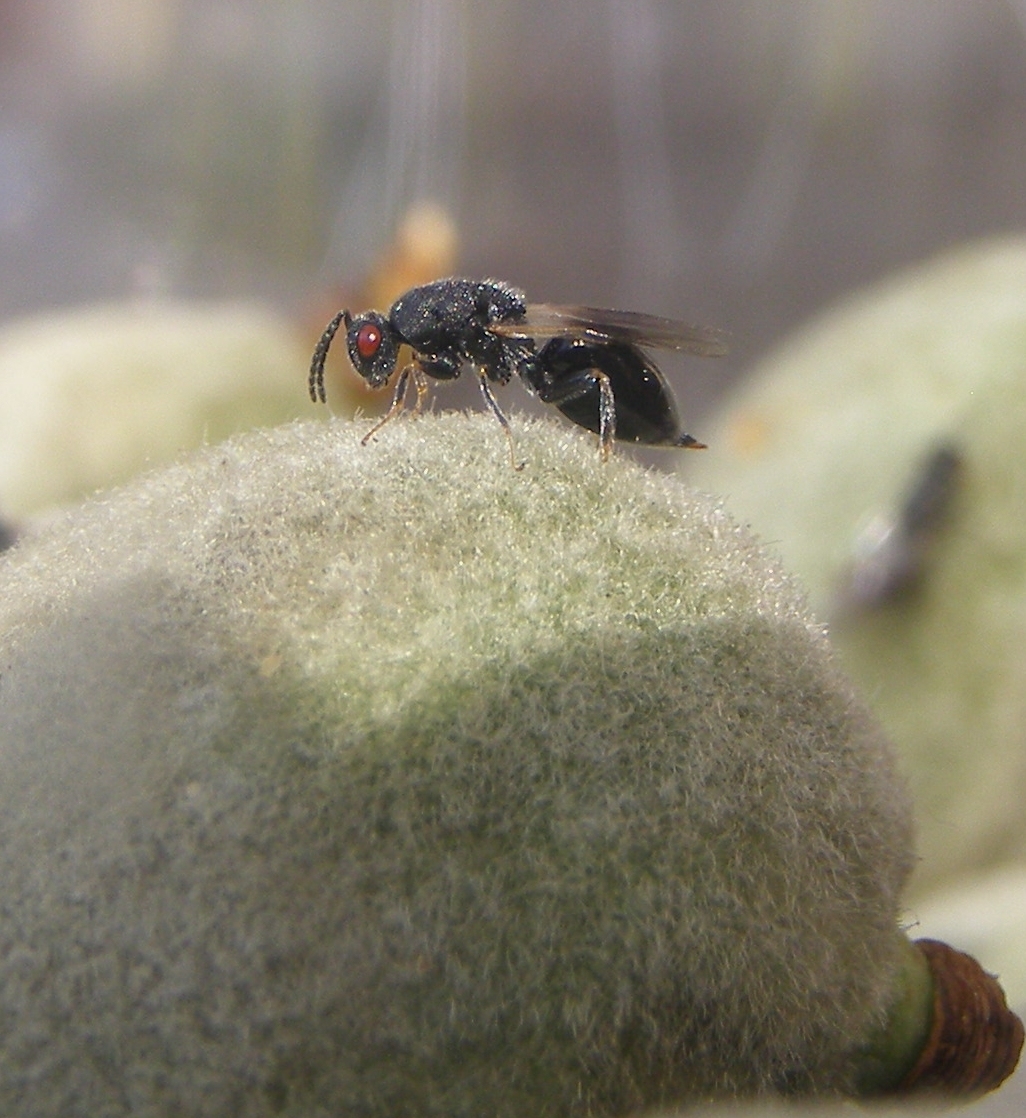

Scientific classification
- Kingdom: Animalia
- Phylum: Arthropoda
- Clade: Pancrustacea
- Class: Insecta
- Order: Hymenoptera
- Family: Eurytomidae
- Genus: Eurytoma
- Species: E. amygdali

Binomial name
- Eurytoma amygdali Enderlein, 1907

= Eurytoma amygdali =

Species of insect

Eurytoma amygdali, or the almond seed wasp, is a species of wasp in the family Eurytomidae which is native to Mediterranean areas, and parts of former Soviet Union.

== Diet and ecology ==
E. amygdali is considered a pest in most of its range, especially in northern Greek districts Thessaloniki and Chalkidiki because they insert their ovaries into almond seeds.

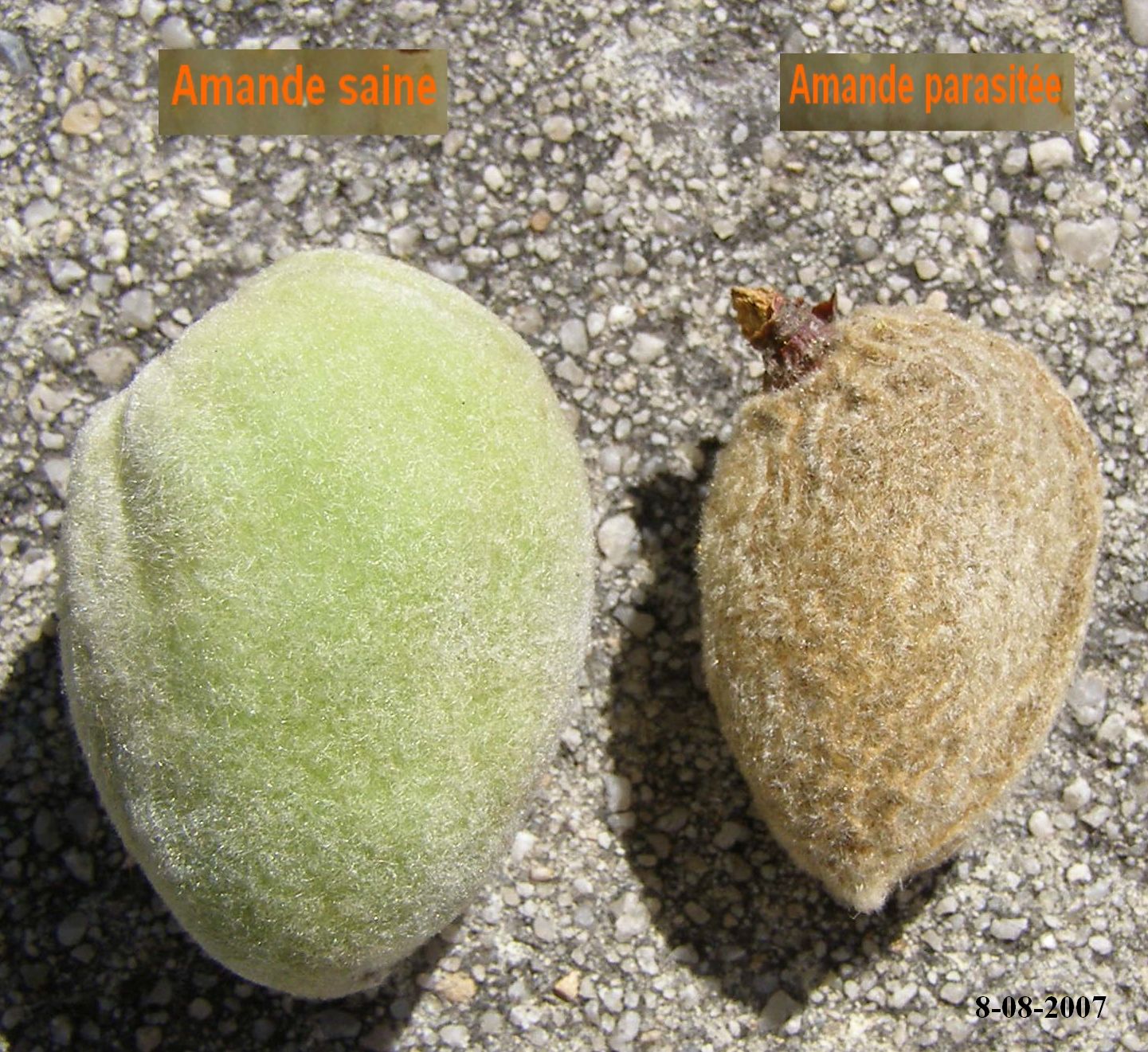
Uninfected and infected almond

The wasp larvae overwinter within the blackened almond seeds.

== Adult ==
The adult male has a length of 4–6 mm and the female 6–8 mm. Its body is glossy/shiny black and its legs have a lighter colour.
