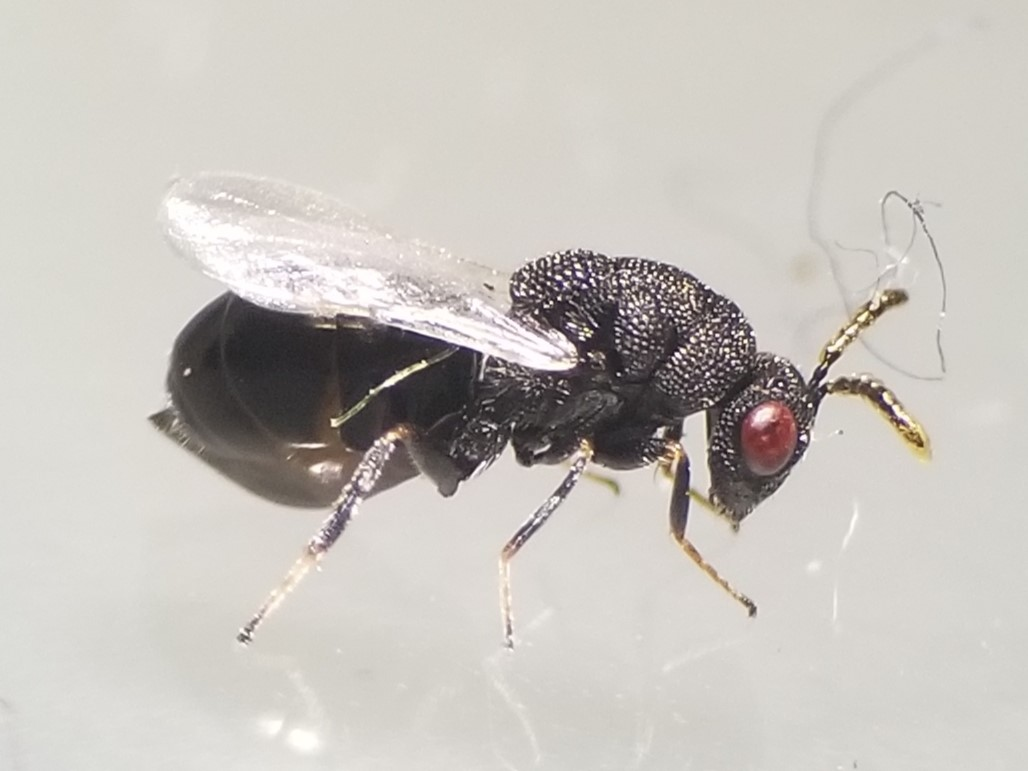

Scientific classification
- Kingdom: Animalia
- Phylum: Arthropoda
- Class: Insecta
- Order: Hymenoptera
- Family: Eurytomidae
- Genus: Eurytoma
- Species: E. obtusiventris

Binomial name
- Eurytoma obtusiventris Gahan 1934

= Eurytoma obtusiventris =

Species of insect

Eurytoma obtusiventris is a species of chalcid wasp in the family Eurytomidae. It is found in North America and is a parasitoid of Eurosta solidaginis. The wasp attacks after oviposition but prior to the formation of a gall. Eurytoma obtusiventris prompts the Eurosta solidaginis larvae to create a pupa, which the wasp will use after consuming its host. They typically consume the host in autumn and overwinter within the gall, emerging during the summer.
