= Sequence-related amplified polymorphism =

A sequence related amplified polymorphism (SRAP) is a molecular technique, developed by G. Li and C. F. Quiros in 2001, for detecting genetic variation in the open reading frames (ORFs) of genomes of plants and related organisms.

== See also ==
- Inclusive composite interval mapping
- Microsatellite (genetics)
- Molecular computational identification
- Molecular marker
- RAPD
- Sequence profiling tool
