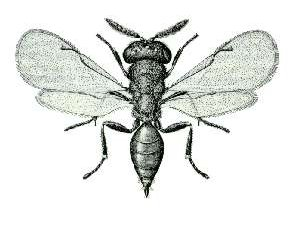
- Bruchophagus roddi

Scientific classification
- Kingdom: Animalia
- Phylum: Arthropoda
- Clade: Pancrustacea
- Class: Insecta
- Order: Hymenoptera
- Family: Eurytomidae
- Subfamily: Eurytominae
- Genus: Bruchophagus

= Bruchophagus =

Genus of wasps

Bruchophagus is a genus of wasps belonging to the family Eurytomidae. Recent phylogenomic study have shown that the genus is paraphyletic.

The genus has cosmopolitan distribution. Bruchophagus is known to feed on the seeds of plants in the Fabaceae family.

== Species ==
Species:

- Bruchophagus abnormis Zerova, 1984
- Bruchophagus abscedus Askew, 2019
- Bruchophagus acaciae (Cameron, 1910)
- Bruchophagus fellis (Girault, 1928)
