= Molecular computational identification =

Molecular computational identification (MCID) is a technique in which molecules are used as means for identifying individual cells or nanodevices.

== See also ==
- RFID
