= Plutarchia (wasp) =

Scientific classification
- Kingdom: Animalia
- Phylum: Arthropoda
- Class: Insecta
- Order: Hymenoptera
- Family: Eurytomidae
- Subfamily: Eurytominae
- Genus: Plutarchia; Girault, 1925

Type species
- Plutarchia bicarinativentris Girault, 1925

Genus of wasps

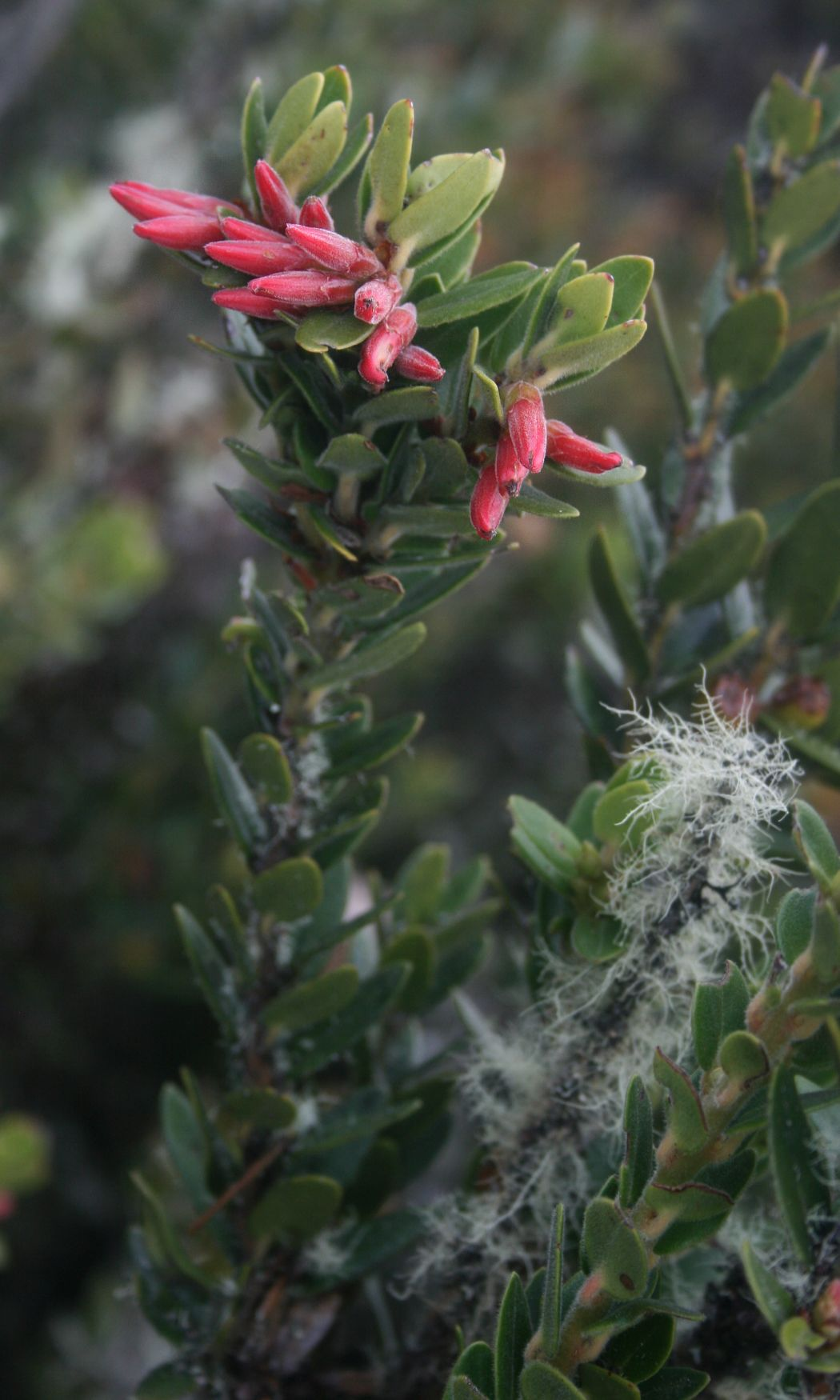
Plutarchia guascensis, heath family (Ericaceae), Colombia

Plutarchia is a genus of chalcid wasp in the subfamily Eurytominae. Alexandre Arsène Girault first circumscribed the genus in 1925; its name honors Plutarch. The genus initially only comprised its type species, P. bicarinativentris, found in Australia. Subsequent species from South Asia and Nigeria have been described and transferred to Plutarchia.

== Biology ==
Species in the genus Plutarchia are parasitoids of the puparia of leaf-miner flies.

== Distribution ==
Species in the genus Plutarchia have been found in Africa, South Asia, and Australasia. Of the described species, one is from Africa, one is from Australia, and 11 are from South Asia.

== Species ==
As of 2021, the Universal Chalcidoidea Database recognizes the following 13 species:

- Plutarchia bengalensis Narendran & Padmasenan, 1990
- Plutarchia bicarinativentris Girault, 1925
- Plutarchia carinata Narendran & Padmasenan, 1990
- Plutarchia fronta Narendran, 1994
- Plutarchia gastris Narendran, 1994
- Plutarchia giraulti Subba Rao, 1974
- Plutarchia gracillima (Dalla Torre, 1898)
- Plutarchia hayati Narendran & Padmasenan, 1990
- Plutarchia indefensa (Walker, 1860)
- Plutarchia keralensis Narendran & Padmasenan, 1990
- Plutarchia malabarica Narendran & Padmasenan, 1990
- Plutarchia marginata Narendran & Padmasenan, 1990
- Plutarchia neepalica Narendran, 1994

There are at least three additional undescribed species.

== See also ==
- List of organisms named after famous people
