= Tetramesa =

Scientific classification
- Kingdom: Animalia
- Phylum: Arthropoda
- Class: Insecta
- Order: Hymenoptera
- Family: Eurytomidae
- Subfamily: Eurytominae
- Genus: Tetramesa; Walker, 1848

Synonyms
- Gahaniola; Exanthosoma Girault, 1915; Gahaniola Erdos, 1952; Harmolita Motschulsky, 1863; Harmolyta Dalla Torre, 1898; Isosoma Walker, 1832; Isosomochares Dalla Torre, 1898; Isosomocharis Ashmead, 1888; Isthmosoma Hedicke, 1921; Philachyra Walker, 1871; Urios Girault, 1911; Xanthosoma Ashmead, 1888

Genus of wasps

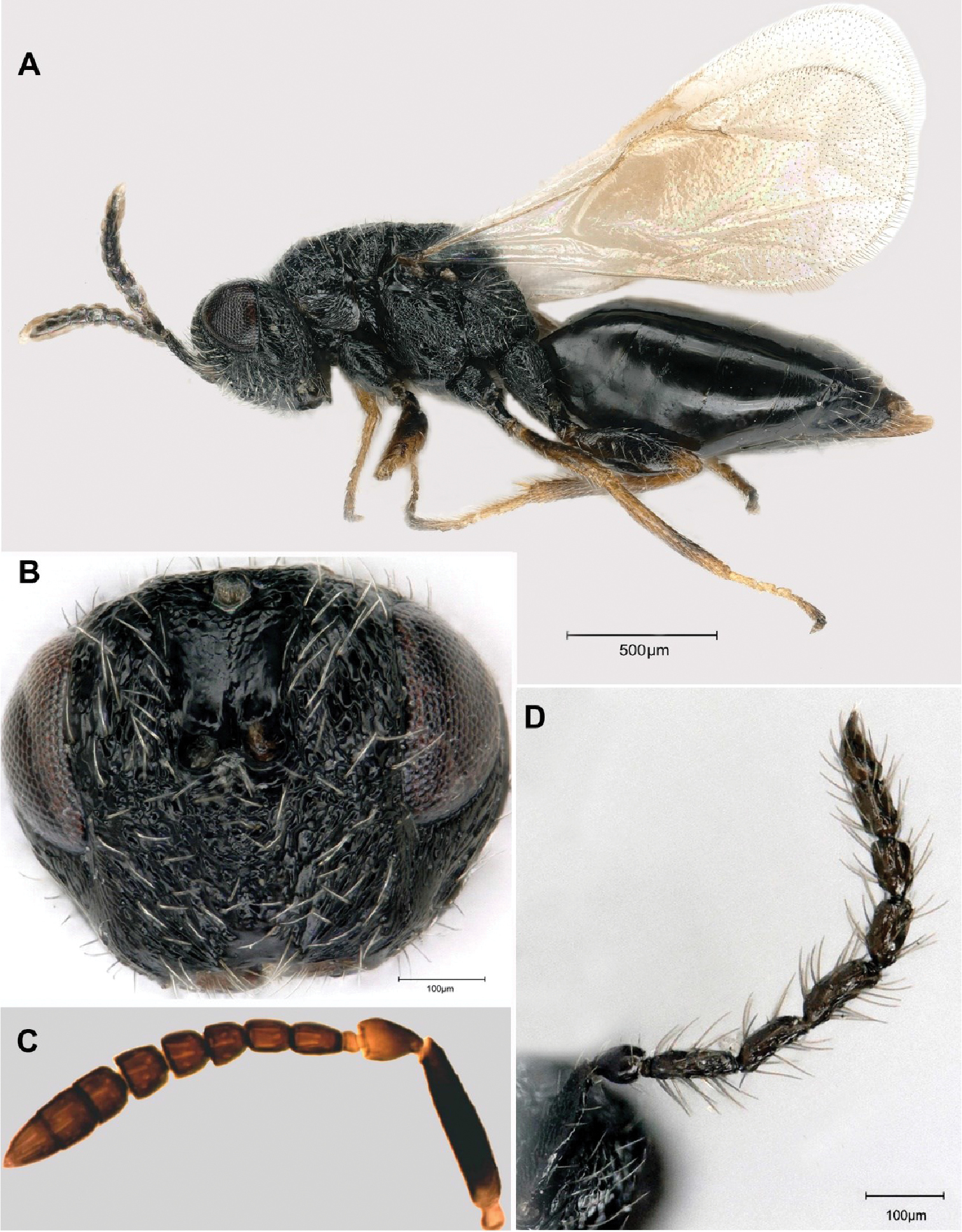
Figure 1. Tetramesa amica Lotfalizadeh, sp. nov. A female habitus in lateral view B head of female in frontal view C female antenna D male antenna.

Tetramesa is a genus of phytophagous wasps. The genus has over 200 described species, and recently the genera Aiolomorphus and Cathilaria have also been synonymized within Tetramesa in light of phylogenomic evidence. They are generally species-specific gall inducers and can be used as biological control for invasive grasses. Adults feed on nectar.
