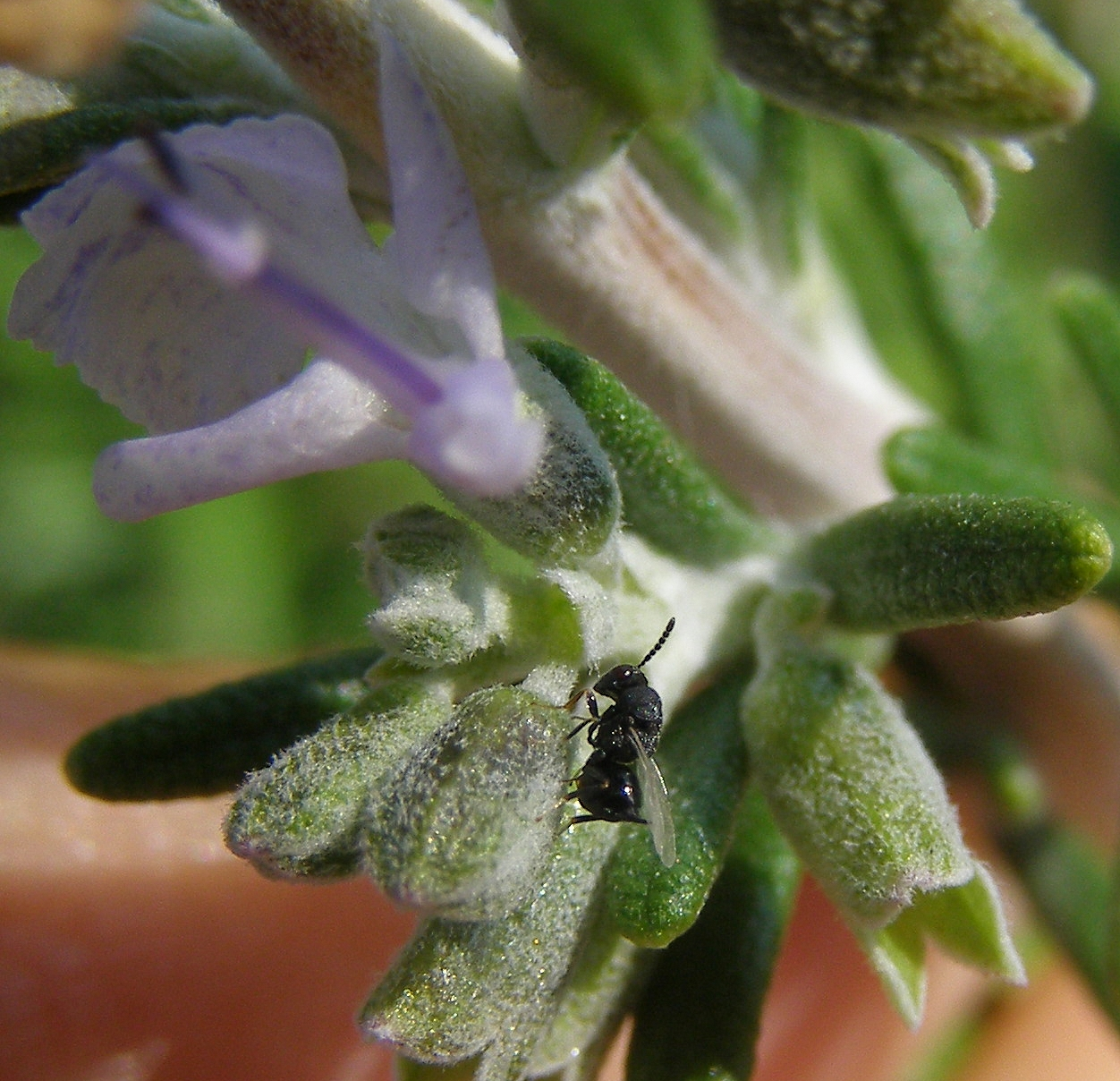

Scientific classification
- Kingdom: Animalia
- Phylum: Arthropoda
- Class: Insecta
- Order: Hymenoptera
- Family: Eurytomidae
- Subfamily: Eurytominae
- Genus: Eurytoma; Illiger, 1807

= Eurytoma =

Genus of wasps

Eurytoma is a genus of parasitoid chalcid wasps in the family Eurytomidae. There are at least 620 described species in Eurytoma. However, both morphological and phylogenomic studies have shown that Eurytoma is a polyphyletic lineage, and extensive taxonomic rearrangements are needed in order to resolve this genus.

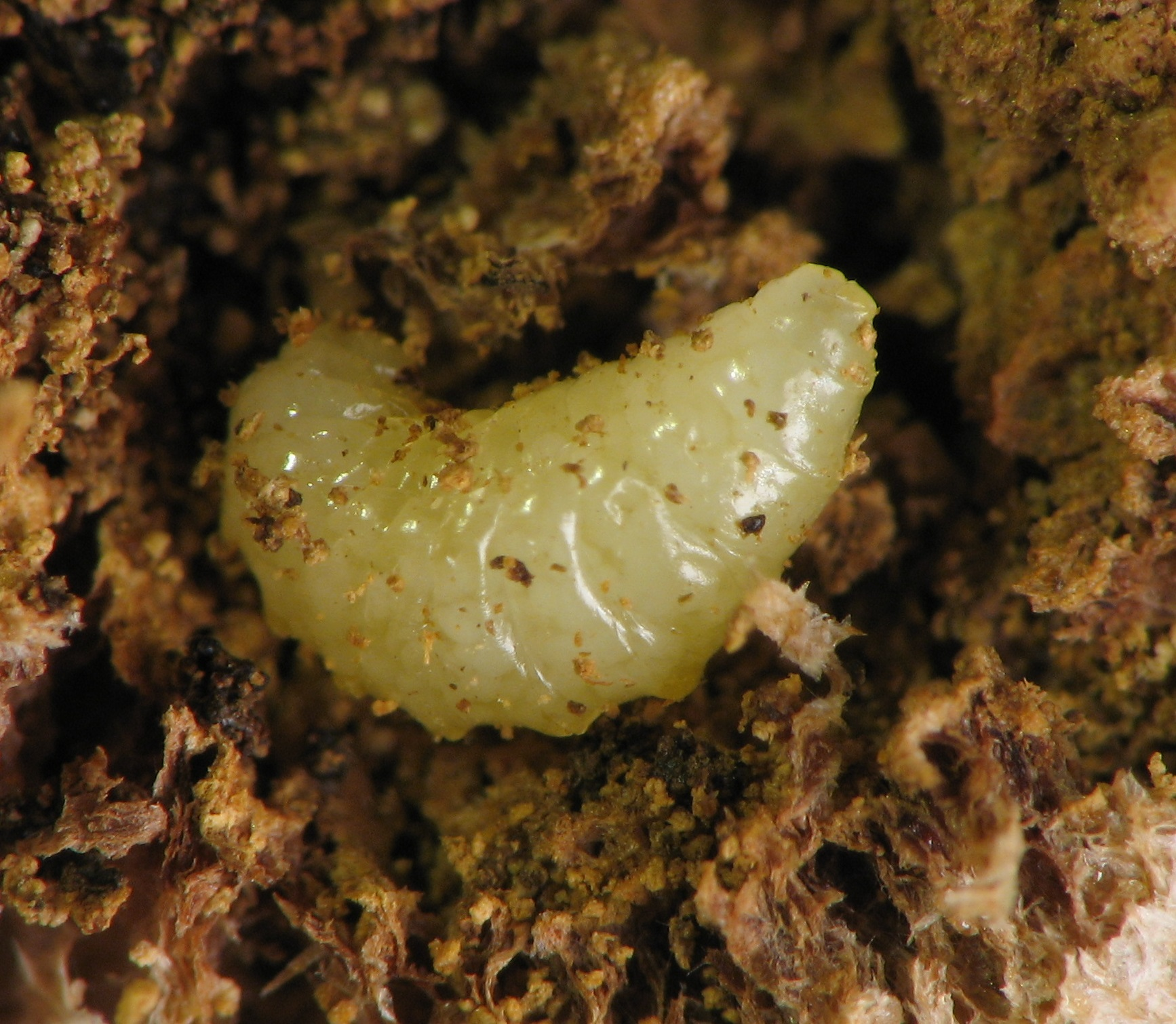
E. gigantea larva

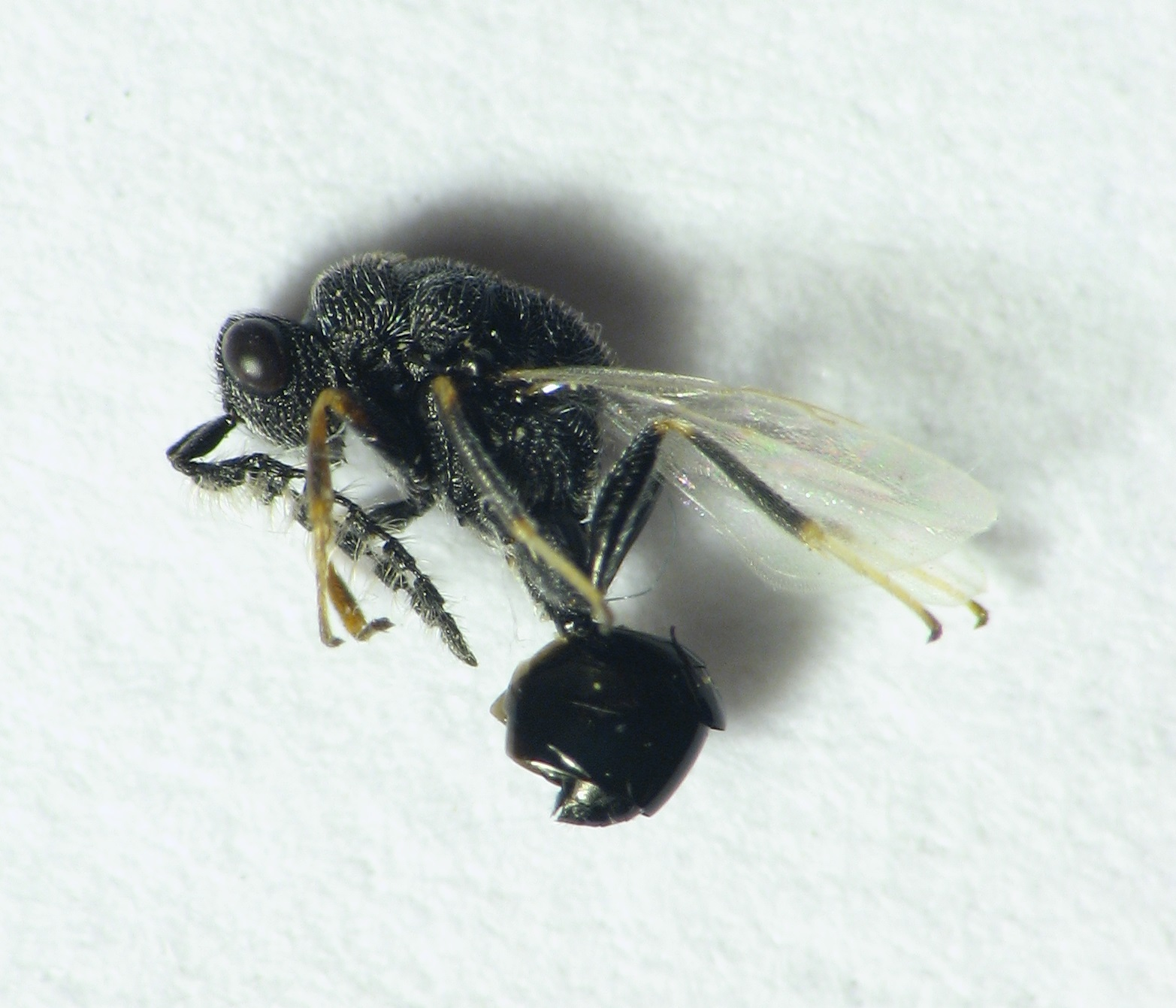
Eurytoma sp. adult male

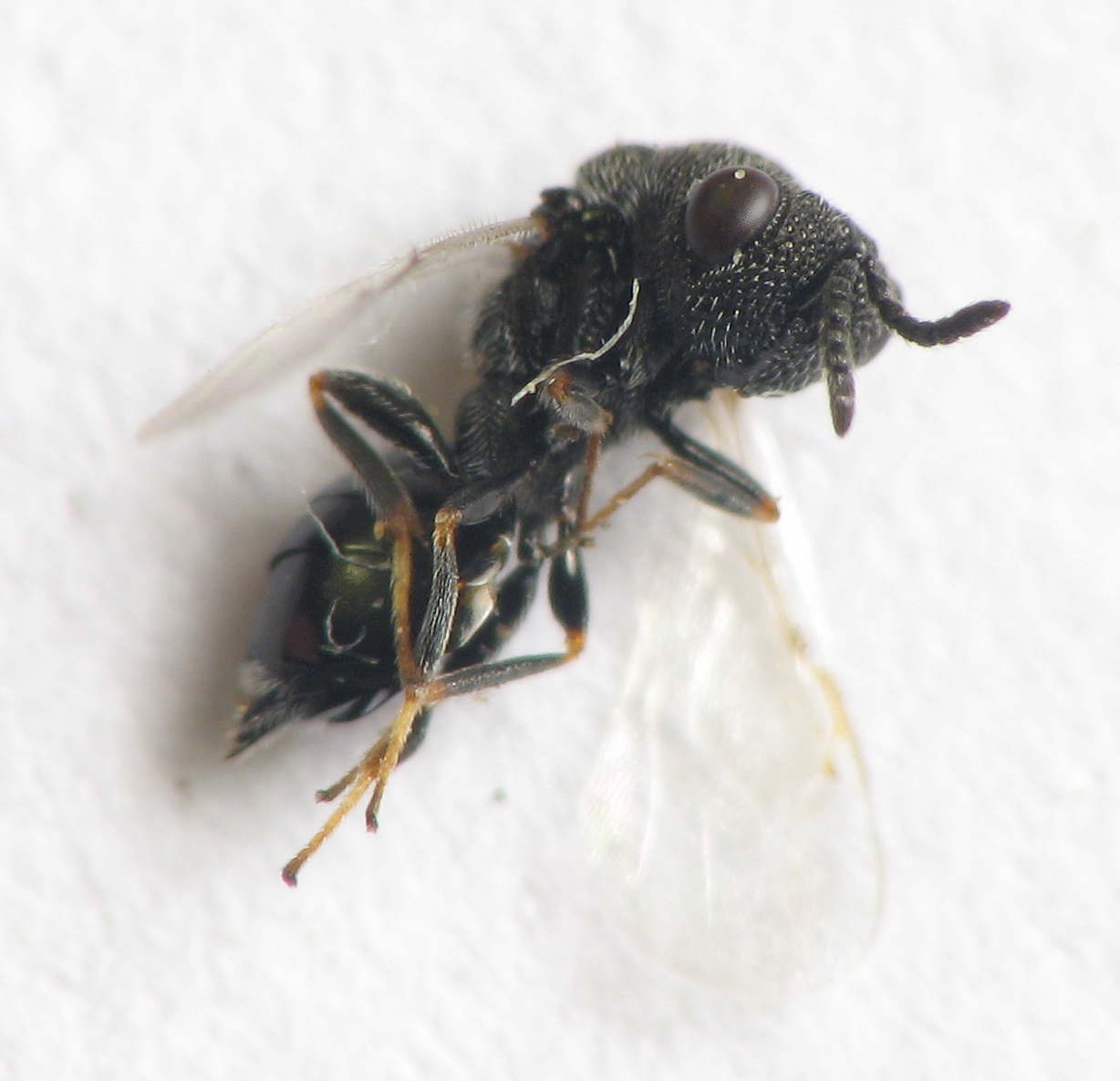
E. gigantea, adult female

== See also ==
- List of Eurytoma species
