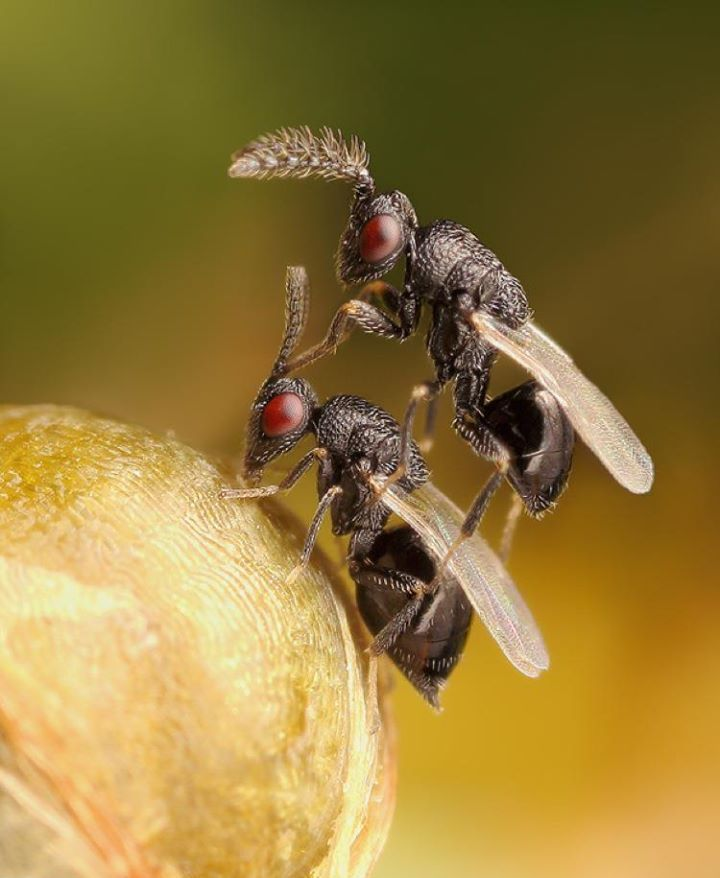

Scientific classification
- Kingdom: Animalia
- Phylum: Arthropoda
- Class: Insecta
- Order: Hymenoptera
- Superfamily: Chalcidoidea
- Family: Eurytomidae; Walker, 1832

Subfamilies
- Buresiinae; Eurytominae; Heimbrinae; Rileyinae

Diversity
- Four subfamilies c.85 genera c.1420 species

= Eurytomidae =

Family of wasps

The Eurytomidae are a family within the superfamily Chalcidoidea.

The larvae of many eurytomids are endophytic, living inside plant tissues (stems, seeds, or galls), either as phytophagous, parasitoids, or a combination of both.

They are found throughout the world in virtually all habitats, a few species are considered pests while others are used as biocontrol agents.

They tend to be dull and not metallic, and heavily punctured, with very thick, collar-like pronota.

Recent phylogenomic work have confirmed the monophyly of the four subfamilies, but many large genera within the speciose Eurytominae remains para- or polyphyletic, such as Eurytoma, Aximopsis, and Bruchophagus.

== Taxa ==
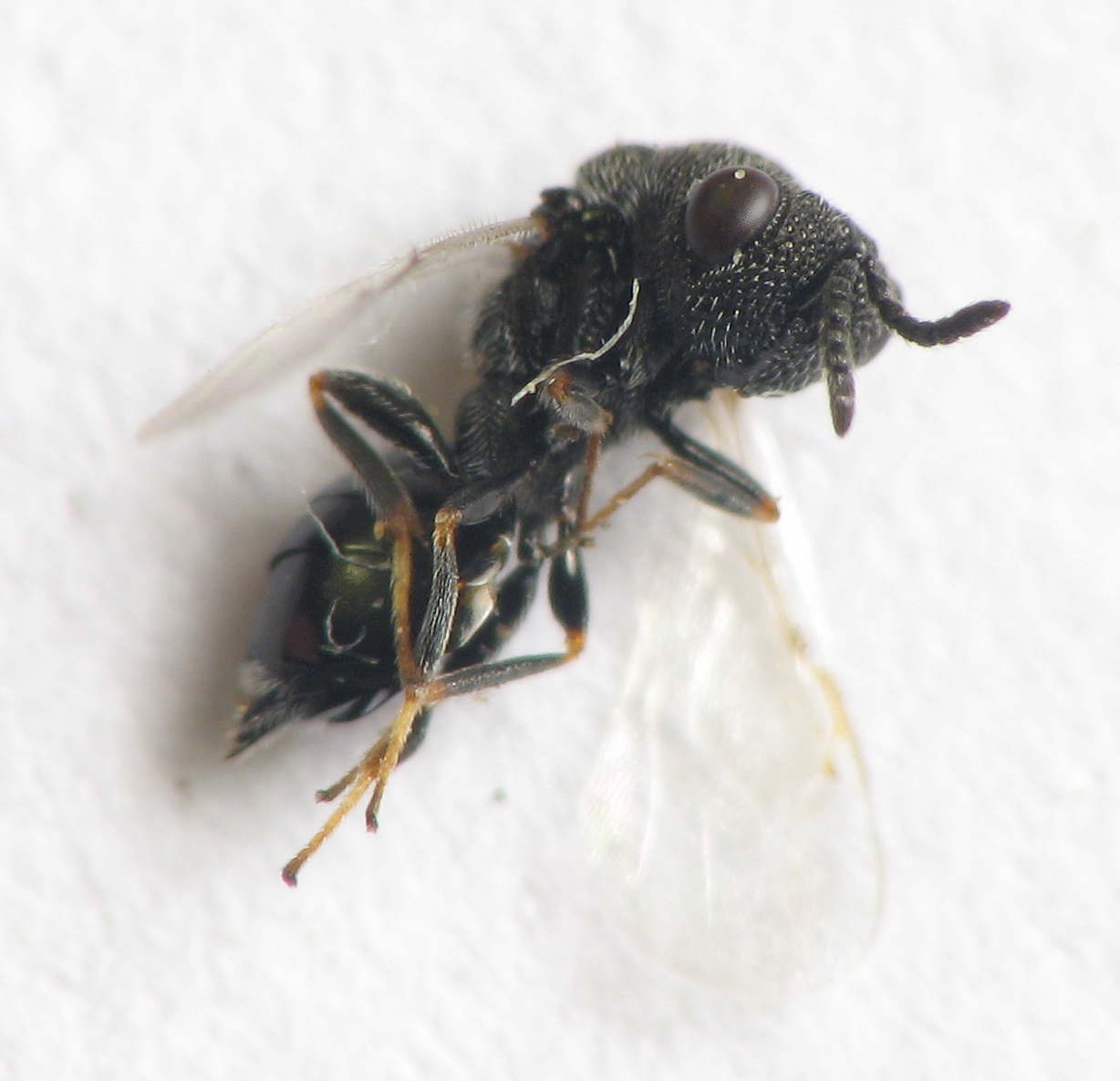
Eurytoma gigantea, adult female

As of 2025, Eurytomid genera include:

Buresiinae Lotfalizadeh et al., 2007

- Buresium Boucek, 1969
- Macrorileya Ashmead, 1900

Eurytominae Walker, 1832

- Aranedra Burks, 1971
- Austrodecatoma Girault, 1925
- Ausystole Boucek, 1988
- Axanthosoma Girault, 1913
- Axanthosomella Narendran, 2001
- Axima Walker, 1862
- Aximopsis Ashmead, 1904
- Banyoma Burks, 1971
- Bephrata Cameron, 1884
- Bephratelloides Girault, 1913
- Bephratoides Brues, 1909
- Bruchodape Burks, 1971
- Bruchophagus Ashmead, 1888
- Burksoma Subba Rao, 1978
- Camponotophilus Gates, 2012
- Cathilaria Burks, 1971
- Chryseida Spinola, 1840
- Chryseurytoma Chen & Huang, 2004
- Endobia Erdos, 1964
- Eudoxinna Walker, 1864
- Eurytoma Illiger, 1807
- Eurytomocharis Ashmead, 1888
- Ficomila Boucek, 1981
- Foutsia Burks, 1971
- Fronsoma Narendran, 1994
- Gibsonoma Narendran, 1994
- Giraultoma Boucek, 1988
- Heimbrella Subba Rao, 1978
- Hexeurytoma Dodd, 1917
- Homodecatoma Liao, 1979
- Houstonia Boucek, 1988
- Isosomodes Ashmead, 1888
- Kavayva Zhang, Gates, & Silvestre 2021
- Khamul Gates, 2008
- Mangoma SubbaRao, 1986
- Masneroma Boucek, 1983
- Neobephrata Narendran & Padmasenan, 1989
- Paradecatoma Masi, 1943
- Philippinoma Narendran, 1994
- Philolema Cameron, 1908
- Phleudecatoma Yang, 1996
- Phylloxeroxenus Ashmead, 1888
- Plutarchia Girault, 1925
- Prodecatoma Ashmead, 1904
- Prodecatomidea Risbec, 1952
- Proseurytoma Kieffer, 1910
- Pseudotetramesa Kalina, 1970
- Ramanuja Narendran, 1989
- Ramdasoma Narendran, 1994
- Risbecoma SubbaRao, 1978
- Stigmeurytoma Boucek, 1988
- Syceurytoma Boucek, 1981
- Sycophila Walker, 1871
- Systole Walker, 1832
- Systolema Narendran, 1994
- Tenuipetiolus Bugbee, 1951
- Tetramesa Walker, 1848
- Tetramesella Zerova, 1974
- Townesoma Narendran, 1994
- Zerovella Narendran & Sheela, 1994

Heimbrinae Burks, 1971

- Heimbra Cameron, 1909
- Symbra Stage & Snelling, 1986

Rileyinae Ashmead, 1904

- Austrophotismus Girault, 1938
- Boucekiana De Santis, 1975
- Dougiola Boucek, 1988
- Gatesina Pujade-Villar et al., 2018
- Neorileya Ashmead, 1904
- Platyrileya Burks, 1971
- Rileya Ashmead, 1888
