= List of eulophid genera =

This is a list of the currently recognized genera in the family Eulophidae (Chalcidoidea).

Acanthala
Aceratoneura
Aceratoneuromyia
Achrysocharoides
Acrias
Afrotroppopsis
Agmostigma
Aleuroctonus
Alibertia
Allocerastichus
Alophomyia
Alveoplectrus
Ambocybe
Ametallon
Anaprostocetus
Anselmella
Anumanniola
Aoridus
Apleurotropis
Apotetrastichus
Aprostocetus
Aprostoporoides
Apterastichus
Arachnolophus
Arachnoobius
Aranobroter
Aroplectrus
Arunus
Ascotolinx
Asecodes
Astichomyiia
Astichus
Atullya
Aulogymnus
Austeulophus
Australsecodes
Awara
Baeoentedon
Baryscapus
Bellerus
Benoitius
Beornia
Boucekastichus
Bridarolliella
Bryopezus
Cabeza
Caccophagus
Callifrons
Careostrix
Carlyeia
Ceranisus
Ceratoneura
Ceratoneuronella
Ceratoneuropsis
Chaenotetrastichus
Chouiola
Chrysocharis
Chrysocharodes
Chrysonotomyia
Chytrolestes
Cirrospiloidelleus
Cirrospilopsis

Cirrospilus
Citrostichus
Cleolophus
Closterocerus
Clotildiella
Clypecharis
Clypomphale
Cobarus
Colpixys
Colpoclypeus
Comastichus
Crataepus
Cristelacher
Cucarastichus
Dahlbominus
Danuviella
Dapsilothrix
Dasyeulophus
Dasyomphale
Davincia
Dentalion
Dermatopelte
Derostenoides
Derostenus
Deuterolophus
Diaulinopsis
Diaulomorpha
Dichatomus
Dicladocerus
Diglyphomorpha
Diglyphomorphomyia
Diglyphus
Dimmockia
Dineulophus
Dinopteridion
Driopteron
Dubeyiella
Dubiostalon
Dzhanokmenia
Elachertomorpha
Elachertus
Elasmus
Emersonella
Encyrtomphale
Enneastichus
Entedon
Entedonastichus
Entedononecremnus
Epichrysoatomus
Epichrysocharis
Eprhopalotus
Eriastichus
Euceratoneura
Euderomphale
Euderus
Eulophinusia
Eulophomorpha
Eulophomyia
Eulophoscotolinx
Eulophus
Euplectromorpha
Euplectrophelinus
Euplectrus

Eupronotius
Eurycephaloplectrus
Exalarius
Exastichus
Galeopsomyia
Gallowayia
Gasterichus
Gattonia
Gautamiella
Ginsiella
Goetheana
Goethella
Grassator
Grotiusomyia
Guptaiella
Gyrolasomyia
Hadranellus
Hadrotrichodes
Hamonia
Hemiptarsenus
Henryana
Holarcticesa
Holcopelte
Holcotetrastichus
Hoplocrepis
Horismenoides
Horismenus
Hubbardiella
Hyssopus
Iniostichus
Inti
Ionympha
Itahipeus
Kiggaella
Kocaagizus
Kocourekia
Kokandia
Kolopterna
Kostjukovius
Kratoysma
Lasalleola
Leptocybe
Lisseurytomella
Makarora
Megaceratoneura
Melittobia
Melittobiopsis
Meruana
Mesofrons
Mestocharella
Mestocharis
Metaplectrus
Microdonophagus
Microlycus
Minotetrastichus
Miotropis
Mischotetrastichus
Mohaniella
Monteithius
Monterrondo
Myrmokata
Narendrania
Naumanniola
Necremnoides
Necremnus

Neoaceratoneura
Neochrysocharis
Neogasterichus
Neohyperteles
Neomestocharella
Neopediobopsis
Neopomphale
Neotrichoporoides
Nesolynx
Nesympiesis
Notanisomorphella
Noyesius
Obesulus
Ogmoelachertus
Omphale
Omphalentedon
Oncastichus
Oomyzus
Opeuderus
Ophelimus
Oradis
Oxycantha
Oxypracetus
Palmistichus
Paphagus
Parachrysocharis
Paracrias
Paragaleopsomyia
Parahorismenus
Paraolinx
Parasecodella
Parasecodes
Paraspalangia
Parasympiesis
Paratetrastichus
Parpholema
Parzaommomyia
Pasohstichus
Pauahiana
Peckelachertus
Pediobius
Pediobomyia
Pediobopsis
Pediocharis
Pelorotelus
Pentastichodes
Pentastichus
Perditorulus
Perinetia
Perthiola
Petalidion
Petiolacus
Phymastichus
Piekna
Planotetrastichus
Platocharis
Platyplectrus
Platytetracampe
Pleurotropopseus
Pleurotroppopsis
Pnigalio
Pomphale

Pracetus
Proacrias
Pronotalia
Pseudiglyphus
Pseudosecodes
Puklina
Quadrastichodella
Quadrastichus
Ratzeburgiola
Renaniana
Rhicnopelte
Rhynchentedon
Ryhonos
Sanyangia
Sarasvatia
Schizocharis
Semielacher
Setelacher
Shardiella
Sifraneurus
Sigmoepilachna
Sigmophora
Skoka
Sphenolepis
Sporrongia
Stenomesius
Stenopetius
Stepanovia
Stipecarinata
Styotrichia
Sympiesis
Sympiesomorpha
Tachinobia
Tamarixia
Tanava
Tetrasta
Tetrastichomphale
Tetrastichomyia
Tetrastichus
Thripastichus
Thripobius
Thymus
Tooloomius
Trichospilus
Trielacher
Trisecodes
Tropicharis
Tropimius
Tylomischus
Urfachus
Uroderostenus
Uroentedon
Wichmannia
Xanthellum
Xenaprostocetus
Xenopomphale
Xiphentedon
Zagrammosoma
Zaommomentedon
Zaommomyiella
Zasympiesis
Zealachertus
Zeastichus
