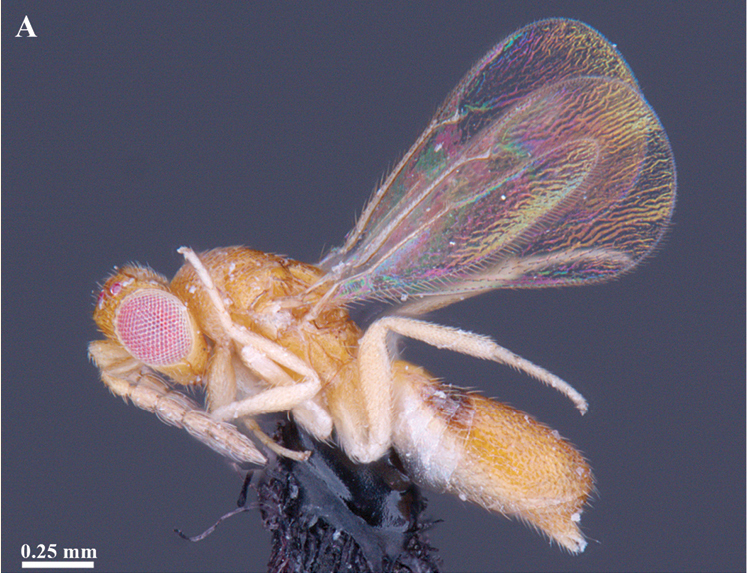

Scientific classification
- Domain: Eukaryota
- Kingdom: Animalia
- Phylum: Arthropoda
- Class: Insecta
- Order: Hymenoptera
- Family: Eulophidae
- Subfamily: Tetrastichinae
- Genus: Chelonastichus; Ranjith & Quicke, 2025
- Species: C. hanssoni

Binomial name
- Chelonastichus hanssoni Ranjith & Quicke, 2025

= Chelonastichus =

Species of wasp

Chelonastichus hanssoni is a species of wasp in the family Eulophidae, found in Thailand. It was described from a single specimen collected in 2021 by a malaise trap in the Sakaerat Biosphere Reserve. It is tentatively placed in the subfamily Tetrastichinae, and is the only known species of Eulophidae to have an abdominal carapace. Its biology is unknown.

== Etymology ==
The genus name Chelonastichus is derived from combining the name of the Braconidae genus Chelonus and astichus, which is derived from the name of the Eulophidae subfamily Tetrastichinae. The species epithet hanssoni is named after Christer Hansson, a Eulophidae specialist at Lund University.

== Description ==
Chelonastichus hanssoni is yellow in color, except for reddish eyes and brown abdominal tergites 2-4. It can be distinguished from all other species of Eulophidae by abdominal tergite 5 modified into a heavily sculptured carapace. It is most similar to species in the genera Sigmophora and Aceratoneura, as all three genera share a raised ridge that runs across the head behind the ocelli. However, neither of these two genera have a carapace-like fifth tergite.

Chelonastichus hanssoni is tentatively placed in the subfamily Tetrastichinae based on the following characteristics: axillae strongly angularly advanced, postmarginal vein of forewing absent, and submarginal vein of forewing not smoothly continuous with parastigma. However, species of Tetrastichinae typically have distinct submedian longitudinal grooves on the scutellum, which appear extremely indistinct in Chelonastichus hanssoni.

== Biology ==
The biology of Chelonastichus hanssoni is unknown, but the authors of the original description suggest that other species of parasitoid wasp with similar abdominal carapaces tend to oviposit into hard objects such as eggs, pupas and galls.
