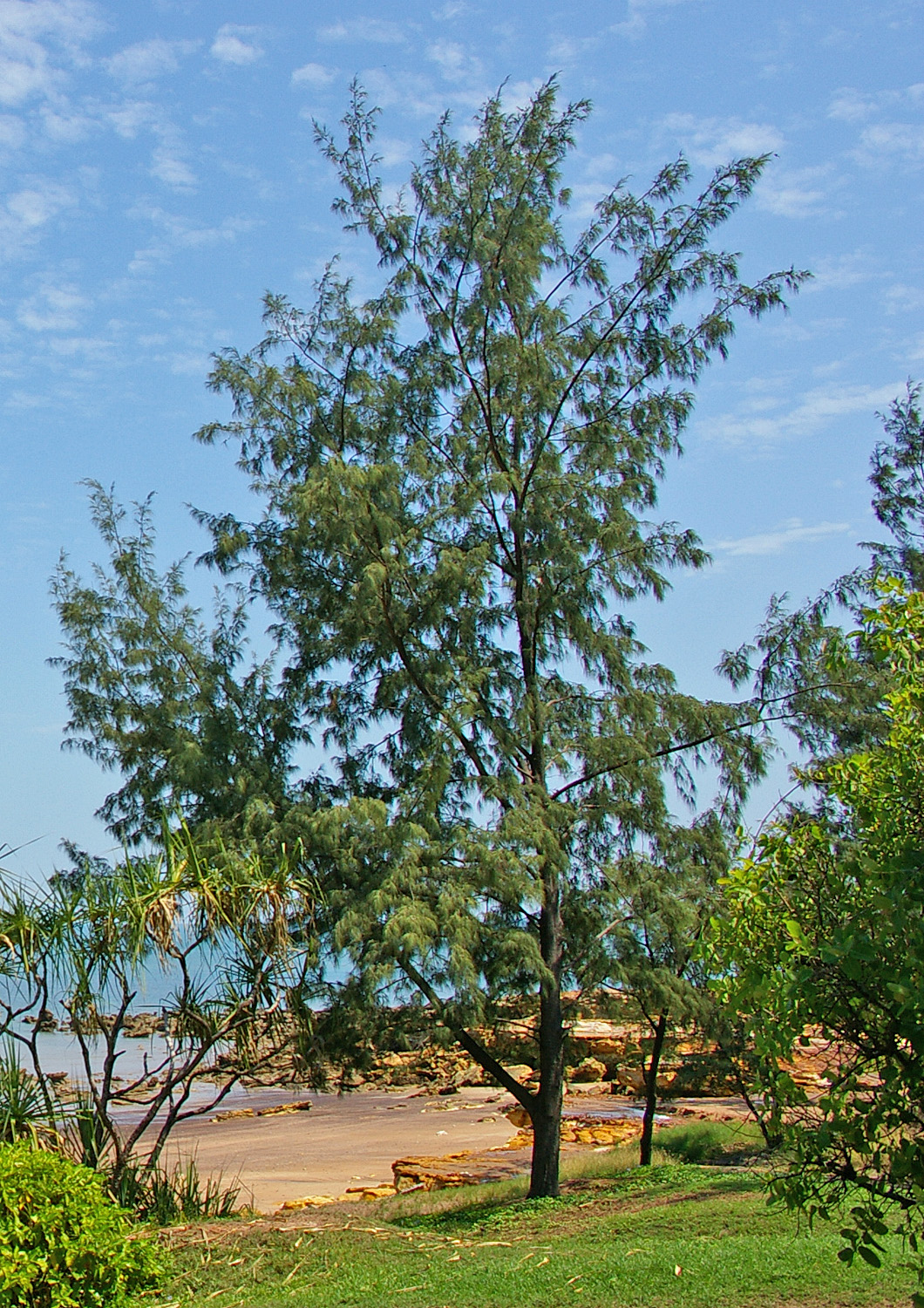
- Subspecies equisetifolia near Darwin, Australia

Conservation status
- Least Concern (IUCN 3.1)

Scientific classification
- Kingdom: Plantae
- Clade: Tracheophytes
- Clade: Angiosperms
- Clade: Eudicots
- Clade: Rosids
- Order: Fagales
- Family: Casuarinaceae
- Genus: Casuarina
- Species: C. equisetifolia

Binomial name
- Casuarina equisetifolia L.

Subspecies
- C. e. subsp. equisetifolia; C. e. subsp. incana

Synonyms
- Casuarina equisetifolia var. typica Domin

= Casuarina equisetifolia =

Species of flowering plant

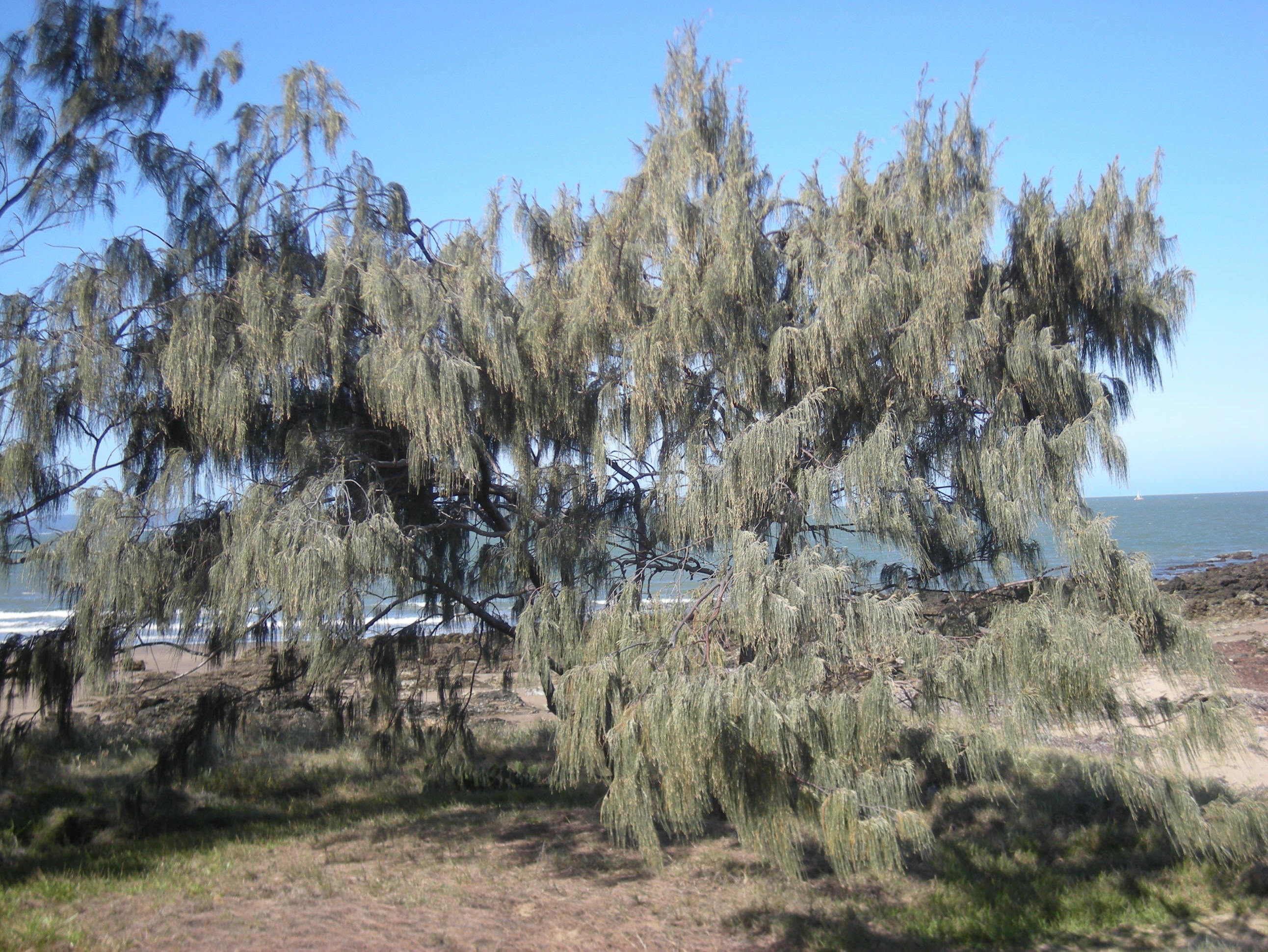
Subspecies incana near Rockhampton

Casuarina equisetifolia, commonly known as coastal she-oak, horsetail she-oak, ironwood, beach sheoak, beach casuarina, whistling tree or Australian pine is a species of flowering plant in the family Casuarinaceae and is native to the Western Pacific, Australia, New Guinea, Southeast Asia and India. It is a small to medium-sized, monoecious tree with scaly or furrowed bark on older specimens, drooping branchlets, the leaves reduced to scales in whorls of 7 or 8, the fruit 10–24 mm (0.4–0.9 in) long containing winged seeds (samaras) 6–8 mm (0.2–0.3 in) long.

== Description ==
=== Habit ===
Casuarina equisetifolia is an evergreen tree typically growing to a height of 6–12 m (20–39 ft), sometimes to 35 m (115 ft) tall. The bark of young specimens is smooth and greyish, older trees have scaly, greyish-brown to black bark.

=== Foliage ===
The foliage consists of slender, drooping branchlets up to 30 cm (12 in) long, the leaves reduced to scale-like teeth 0.3–0.5 mm (0.01–0.02 in) long, arranged in whorls of 7 or 8 (occasionally 6) around the branchlets. The sections of branchlet between the leaf whorls (the "articles") are 5–13 mm (0.2–0.5 in) long and 0.5–1.0 mm (0.02–0.04 in) wide.

=== Flowers ===
This species of Casuarina is monoecious with male and female flowers produced on the same tree, unlike most other species of its same genus which are dioecious. Its male and female inflorescences are both shaped like catkins. Its male flowers appear in simple spikes 0.7–4 cm (0.28–1.57 in) long in whorls of 7 to 11.5 per cm (per 0.4 in), with anthers are 0.6–0.8 mm (0.02–0.03 in) long, whereas its female flowers are 3–13 mm (0.1–0.5 in) long on short, sparsely hairy peduncles.

=== Fruit ===
The fruit is an oval woody structure 10–24 mm (0.39–0.94 in) long and 9–13 mm (0.35–0.51 in) in diameter when mature, superficially resembling a conifer cone made up of numerous carpels. Each carpel contains a single small winged seed 6–8 mm (0.24–0.31 in) long.

== Taxonomy and naming ==
The genus Casuarina was first formally described in 1759 by Carl Linnaeus in Amoenitates Academicae and the first species he described was Casuarina equisetifolia. The specific epithet equisetifolia means 'horsehair-leaved'.

In 1873, George Bentham described Casuarina equisetifolia var. equisetifolia and C. equisetifolia var. incana in Flora Australiensis, and in 1982, Lawrie Johnson changed the names to subspecies equisetifolia and incana respectively, in the Journal of the Adelaide Botanic Gardens:

- Casuarina equisetifolia L. subsp. equisetifolia, a tree 7–35 m (23–115 ft) high, the articles 5–8 mm (0.2–0.3 in) long and 0.5–0.7 mm (0.02–0.03 in) wide with 8 to 10 teeth 0.3–0.8 mm (0.01–0.03 in) long, the male spikes 7–40 mm (0.3–1.6 in) long, the cones 12–24 mm (0.5–0.9 in) long and 9–11 mm (0.35–0.43 in) wide on a peduncle 3–10 mm (0.1–0.4 in) long.
- Casuarina equisetifolia subsp. incana (Benth.) L.A.S.Johnson. a tree 6–12 m (20–39 ft) high, the articles 7–13 mm (0.3–0.5 in) long and 0.7–1.0 mm (0.03–0.04 in) wide with 8 to 10 teeth about 0.7 mm (0.03 in) long, the male spikes 12–25 mm (0.5–1.0 in) long, the cones 10–20 mm (0.4–0.8 in) long, 10–13 mm (0.4–0.5 in) wide and densely covered with white to rust-coloured hairs, on a peduncle 3–13 mm (0.1–0.5 in) long. The epithet incana means 'white' or 'hoary'.

There is some doubt as to whether Linnaeus' publication of C. equisetifolia is valid, since he based his description solely on Rumphius's description of Casuarina litorea in Herbarium Amboinense and there are no type specimens.

This species is sometimes given the common name "Australian pine" because it has features that seem superficially like those of a pine, but it is not a conifer.

== Distribution and habitat ==
Casuarina equisetifolia subsp. equisetifolia grows near the sea, behind beaches and near estuaries, sometimes on rocky headlands in Australia, New Guinea, Southeast Asia and India. The species is native to India and Bangladesh in South Asia; Myanmar, the Andaman Islands, Nicobar Islands, Vietnam, Thailand, Cambodia, Peninsular Malaysia, the Philippines, Borneo, Java and the Lesser Sunda Islands, islands in the South China Sea, Sulawesi and Sumatra in Southeast Asia; the Carolines, Fiji, the Marianas, the Marshall Islands, New Caledonia, Samoa, Solomon Islands, Tonga, Tuvalu and Vanuatu in the Pacific Ocean; New Guinea; and New South Wales, the Northern Territory, and Queensland in Australia.

Subspecies incana grows on rocky headlands near the coasts of eastern Queensland and New South Wales as far south as Laurieton.

Casuarina equisetifolia has been introduced to many other continents and islands. It is an invasive species in the United States, but biological control by insects, including by a Selitrichodes wasp and Carposinidae and Gelechiidae moths, has been effective. It is also regarded as being invasive in South Africa.

== Ecology ==
Casuarina equisetifolia is an actinorhizal plant able to fix atmospheric nitrogen through a symbiotic relationship with strains of Frankia, a actinomycete hosted in nodules on its roots.

== Uses ==
Besides its ornamental uses, Casuarina equisetifolia has also been explored for its potential in remediation of textile dye wastewater. The leaves were found to be useful as absorbent material for the removal of textile dyes such as reactive orange 16, rhodamine B, methylene blue, malachite green and methyl violet 2B. Similarly, the dried cone was also reported to be able to remove rhodamine B and methyl violet 2B. The bark was reported to be able to remove methylene blue. Even the seed was found to be useful in dye removal of neutral red and malachite green. The carbon derived from the cones of C. equisetifolia was found to be a good absorbent for landfill leachate, while another laboratory also reported good absorbency for copper ions from aqueous solution. Line planting of C. equisetifolia trees in coastal areas has been known to help control the force of the wind. In countries like India, it has been known as a suitable species for wasteland development.

== Culture ==
In the Philippines, the town of Agoo is named after the tree (known as agoho or aroo in the Ilocano language).

== Gallery ==
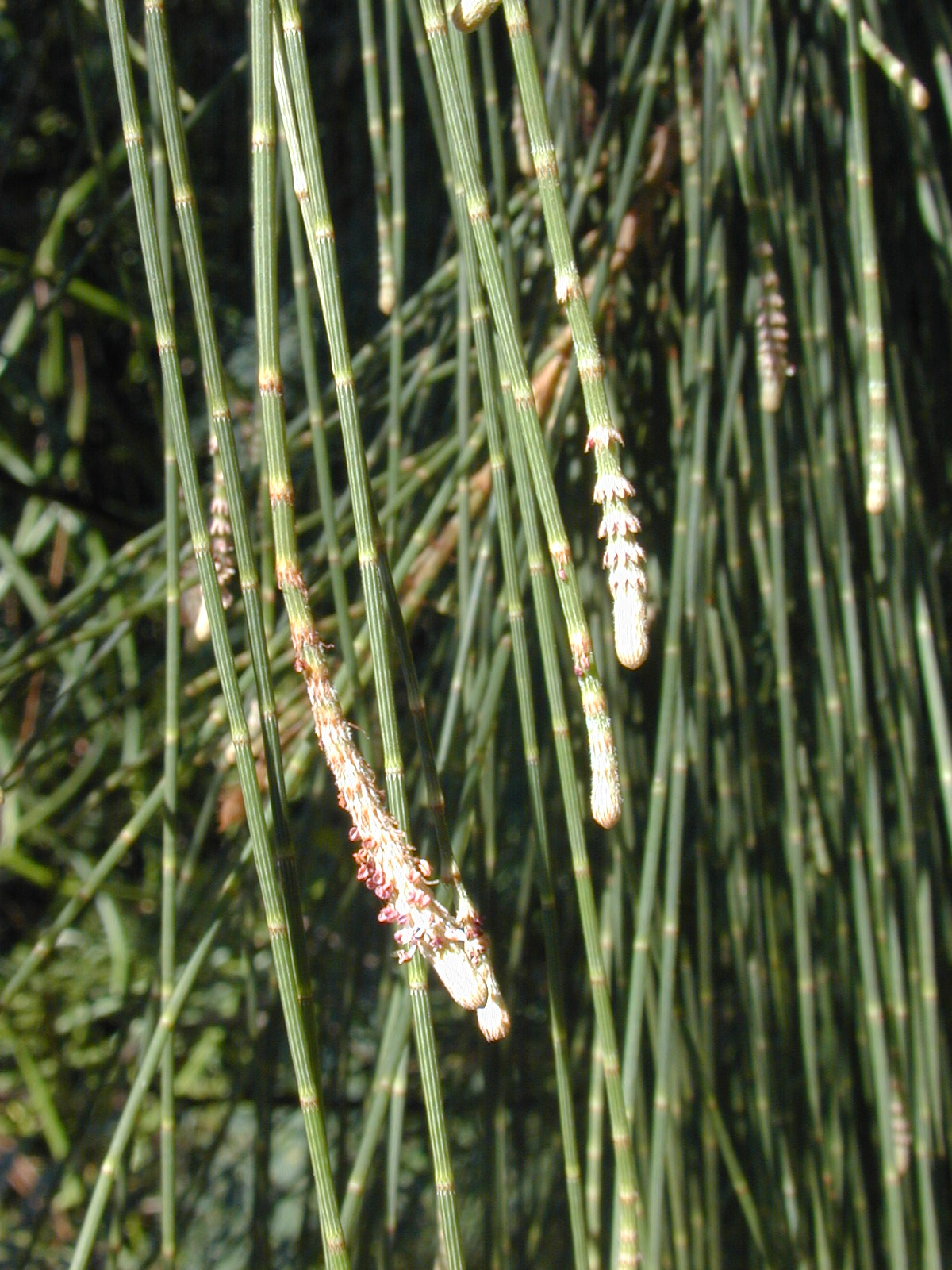
Branchlets and male spike

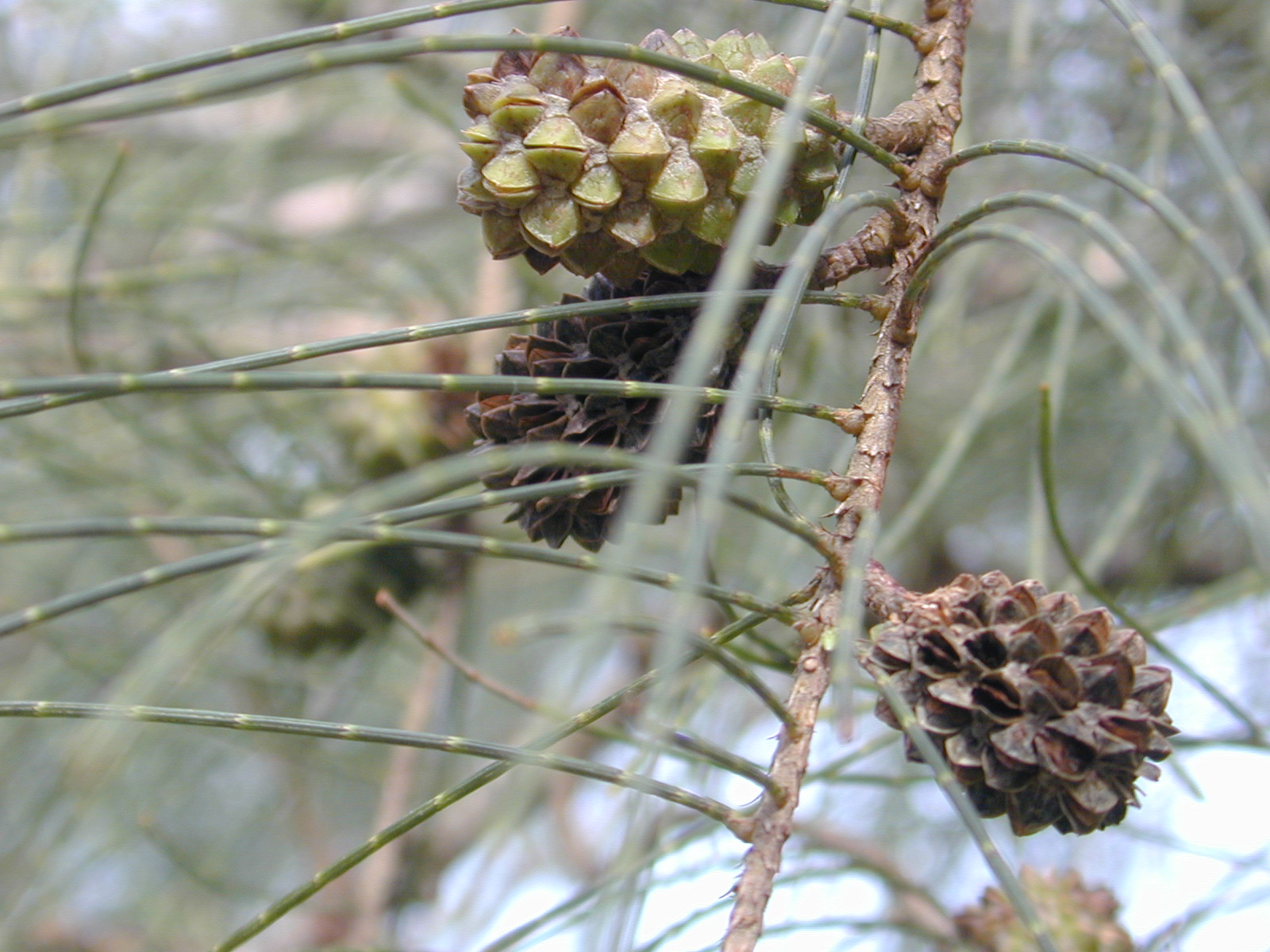
Mature female cones

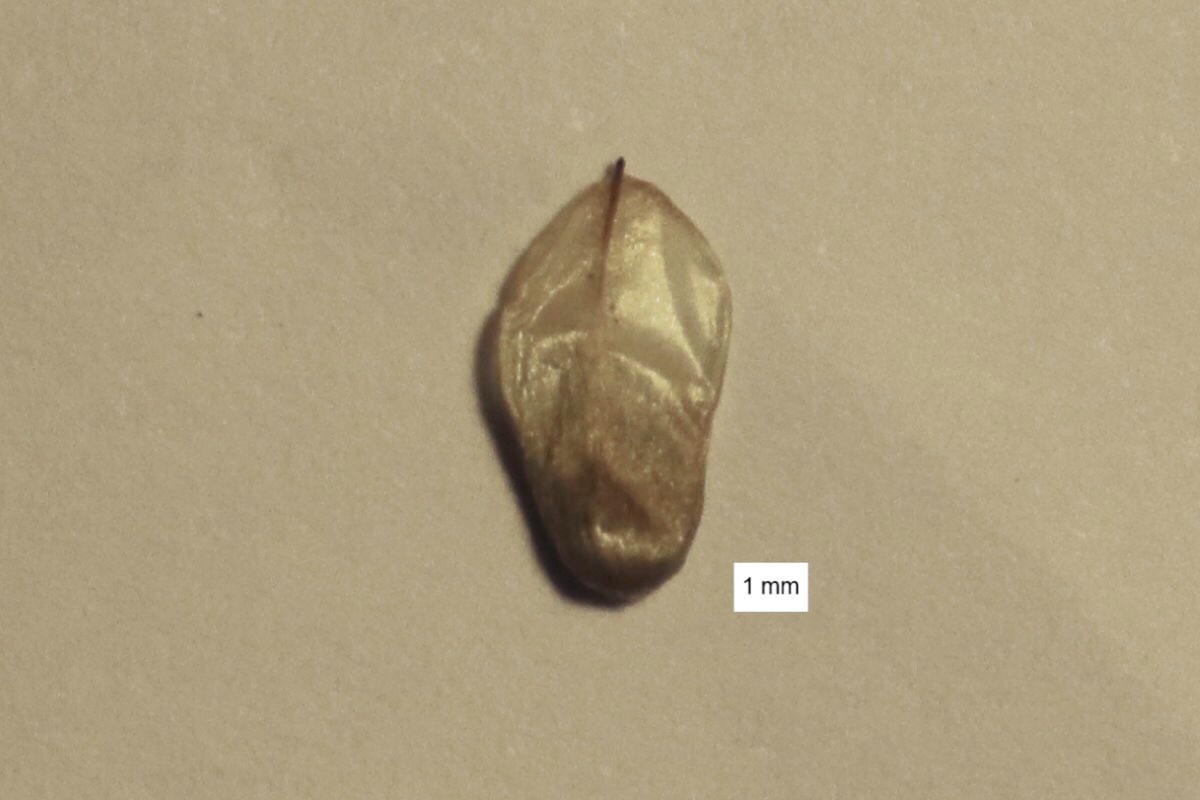
Samara

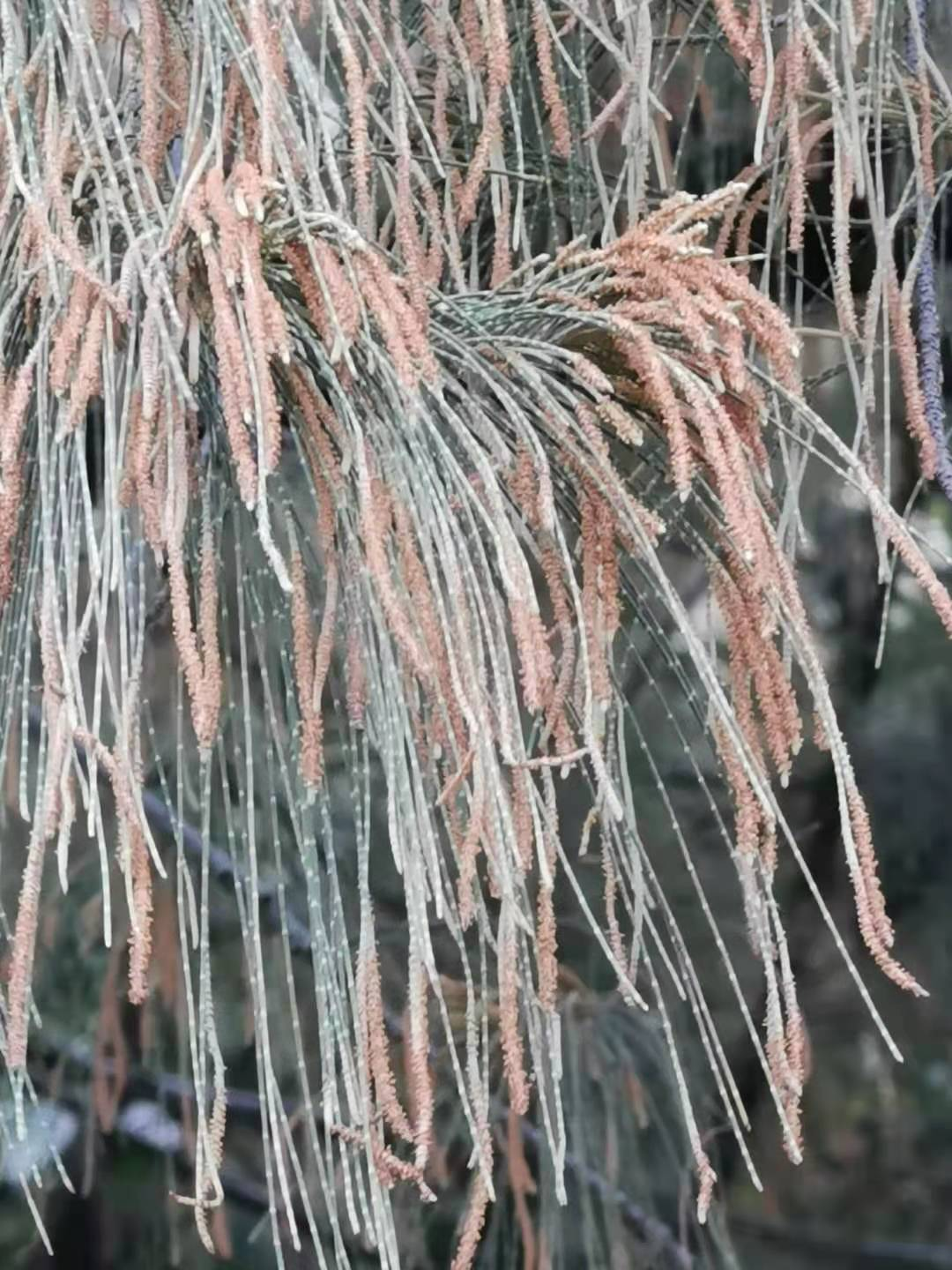
Male spikes
