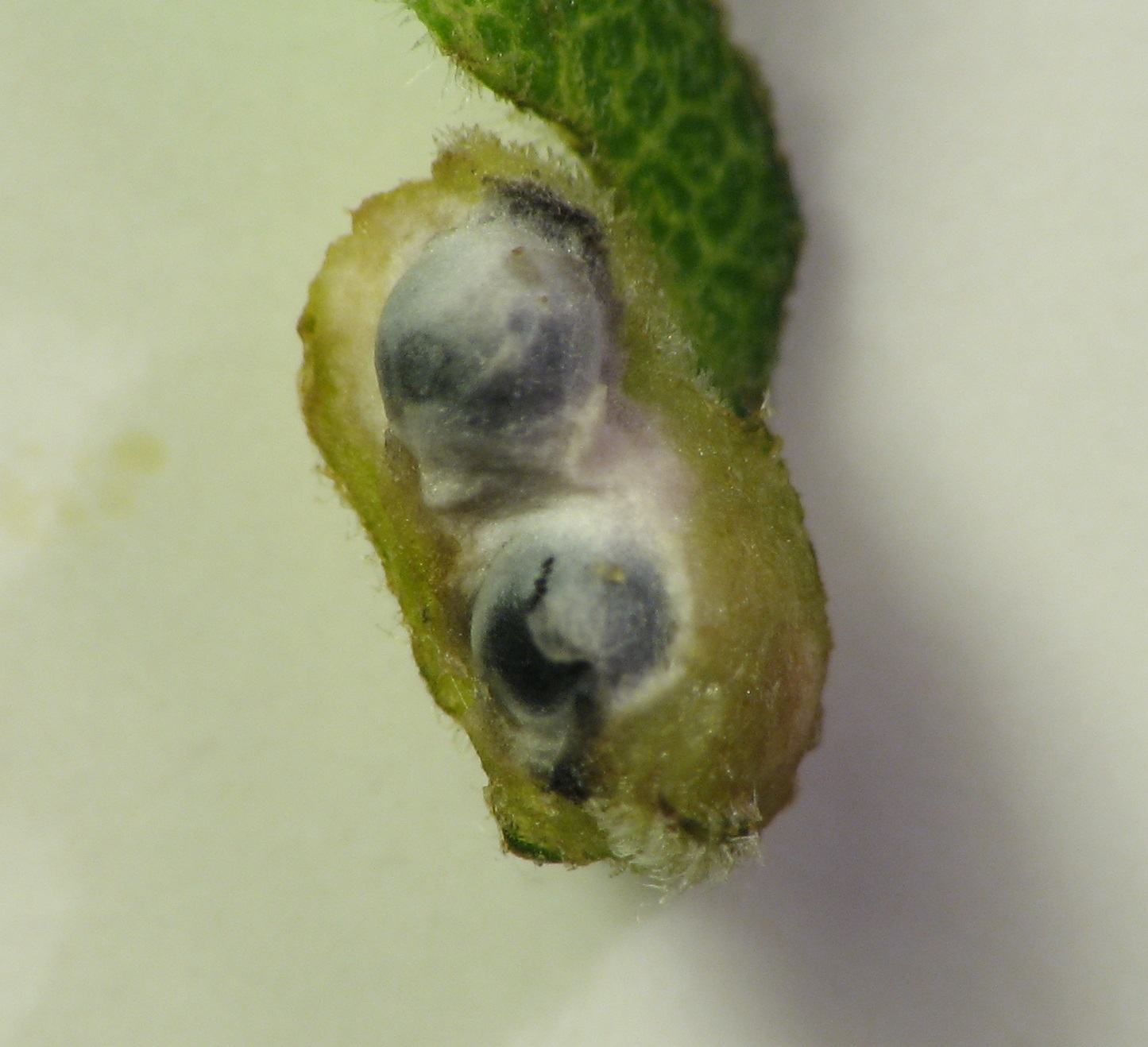
- Galeopsomyia galls on goldenrod

Scientific classification
- Domain: Eukaryota
- Kingdom: Animalia
- Phylum: Arthropoda
- Class: Insecta
- Order: Hymenoptera
- Family: Eulophidae
- Subfamily: Tetrastichinae
- Genus: Galeopsomyia; Girault, 1916

Type species
- Galeopsomyia haemon (Walker, 1847)

Species
- see Text

= Galeopsomyia =

Genus of wasps

Galeopsomyia is a New World genus of hymenopteran insects of the family Eulophidae. The genus is a hyperparasitoid of other gall-inducing wasps of the genera Eurytoma and Torymus.

== Species ==
The following species are included in Galeopsomyia:

- Galeopsomyia compacta (Howard, 1897)
- Galeopsomyia cupreus (Ashmead, 1894)
- Galeopsomyia deilochus (Walker, 1839)
- Galeopsomyia epidius (Walker, 1847)
- Galeopsomyia fausta LaSalle, 1997
- Galeopsomyia haemon (Walker, 1847)
- Galeopsomyia nicaraguaensis (Cameron, 1904)
- Galeopsomyia nigrocyanea (Ashmead, 1886)
- Galeopsomyia persimilis (Ashmead, 1904)
- Galeopsomyia scadius (Walker, 1843)
- Galeopsomyia squamosa (Girault, 1917)
- Galeopsomyia sulcata (Howard, 1897)
- Galeopsomyia transcarinata (Gahan, 1919)
- Galeopsomyia valerus (Walker, 1839)
- Galeopsomyia viridicyanea (Ashmead, 1904)
