= Petalidion =

Scientific classification
- Kingdom: Animalia
- Phylum: Arthropoda
- Class: Insecta
- Order: Hymenoptera
- Family: Eulophidae
- Subfamily: Tetrastichinae
- Genus: Petalidion; Graham, 1987

Species
- Petalidion hellenicum Graham, 1987

Genus of wasps

Petalidion is a genus of hymenopteran insects of the family Eulophidae.
