= Pracetus =

Scientific classification
- Domain: Eukaryota
- Kingdom: Animalia
- Phylum: Arthropoda
- Class: Insecta
- Order: Hymenoptera
- Family: Eulophidae
- Subfamily: Tetrastichinae
- Genus: Pracetus; Boucek, 1988

Type species
- Pracetus longus Boucek, 1988

Species
- Pracetus longus Boucek, 1988; Pracetus stramenticius (Delucchi, 1962)

Genus of wasps

Pracetus is a genus of hymenopteran insects of the family Eulophidae.
