= Tetrastichomyia =

Scientific classification
- Kingdom: Animalia
- Phylum: Arthropoda
- Class: Insecta
- Order: Hymenoptera
- Family: Eulophidae
- Subfamily: Tetrastichinae
- Genus: Tetrastichomyia; Girault, 1916

Type species
- Tetrastichomyia clisiocampae (Ashmead, 1894)

Species
- Tetrastichomyia clisiocampae (Ashmead, 1894); Tetrastichomyia pulchricornis (Gahan, 1919); Tetrastichomyia silvensis Girault, 1916

Synonyms
- Apterolophus Gahan, 1919

Genus of wasps

Tetrastichomyia is a genus of hymenopteran insects of the family Eulophidae.
