= Anaprostocetus =

Scientific classification
- Domain: Eukaryota
- Kingdom: Animalia
- Phylum: Arthropoda
- Class: Insecta
- Order: Hymenoptera
- Family: Eulophidae
- Subfamily: Tetrastichinae
- Genus: Anaprostocetus; Graham, 1987

Type species
- Anaprostocetus dehraensis Graham, 1987

Species
- Anaprostocetus acuminatus (Ratzeburg, 1848); Anaprostocetus ankarensis Gençer, 2010; Anaprostocetus areos Narendran & Fousi, 2005; Anaprostocetus cenxiensis Sheng, 1995; Anaprostocetus dehraensis Graham, 1987; Anaprostocetus keralicus Narendran & Girish Kumar, 2005; Anaprostocetus sringeriensis Narendran & Santhosh, 2005

Genus of wasps

Anaprostocetus is a genus of hymenopteran insects of the family Eulophidae.
