= Kratoysma =

Scientific classification
- Domain: Eukaryota
- Kingdom: Animalia
- Phylum: Arthropoda
- Class: Insecta
- Order: Hymenoptera
- Family: Eulophidae
- Subfamily: Entedoninae
- Genus: Kratoysma; Boucek, 1965

Type species
- Kratoysma usticrus (Erdos, 1954)

Species
- Kratoysma citri Boucek, 1988; Kratoysma ecuadorensis Hansson, 1993; Kratoysma gliricidiae Hansson & Cave, 1993; Kratoysma longifacies Hansson, 1985; Kratoysma nepalensis Hansson, 1985; Kratoysma usticrus (Erdos, 1954)

Genus of wasps

Kratoysma is a genus of hymenopteran insects of the family Eulophidae.
