= Pronotalia =

Scientific classification
- Domain: Eukaryota
- Kingdom: Animalia
- Phylum: Arthropoda
- Class: Insecta
- Order: Hymenoptera
- Family: Eulophidae
- Subfamily: Tetrastichinae
- Genus: Pronotalia; Gradwell, 1957

Type species
- Pronotalia trypetae Gradwell, 1957

Species
- Pronotalia carlinarum (Szelényi and Erdös, 1951); Pronotalia erzurumica Doganlar, 1993; Pronotalia fiorii (Domenichini, 1958); Pronotalia hungarica (Erdös, 1955); Pronotalia inflata Graham, 1991; Pronotalia orobanchiae Graham, 1991; Pronotalia tortumensis Doganlar, 1993; Pronotalia trypetae Gradwell, 1957

Synonyms
- Crataepiella Domenichini, 1958

Genus of wasps

Pronotalia is a genus of hymenopteran insects of the family Eulophidae.
