= Lisseurytomella =

Scientific classification
- Kingdom: Animalia
- Phylum: Arthropoda
- Class: Insecta
- Order: Hymenoptera
- Family: Eulophidae
- Subfamily: Tetrastichinae
- Genus: Lisseurytomella; Gahan & Fagan, 1923

Species
- Lisseurytomella flava (Ashmead, 1900)

Genus of wasps

Lisseurytomella is a genus of hymenopteran insects of the family Eulophidae.
