= Puklina =

Scientific classification
- Kingdom: Animalia
- Phylum: Arthropoda
- Class: Insecta
- Order: Hymenoptera
- Family: Eulophidae
- Subfamily: Tetrastichinae
- Genus: Puklina; Graham, 1991

Type species
- Puklina amblyteles Graham, 1991

Species
- Puklina amblyteles Graham, 1991; Puklina asphodelinae Boyadzhiev, 2003; Puklina depilate Graham, 1991; Puklina dillerae Doganlar, 1993; Puklina gelincika Doganlar, 1993

Genus of wasps

Puklina is a genus of hymenopteran insects of the family Eulophidae.
