= Leprosa =

Scientific classification
- Domain: Eukaryota
- Kingdom: Animalia
- Phylum: Arthropoda
- Class: Insecta
- Order: Hymenoptera
- Family: Eulophidae
- Subfamily: Tetrastichinae
- Genus: Leprosa; Kim & La Salle, 2008
- Species: L. milga

Binomial name
- Leprosa milga Kim and La Salle, 2008

Species of wasp

Leprosa milga is a species of Afrotropical wasp in the family Eulophidae, the only member of the genus Leprosa. It is a gall wasp which induces the production of galls on the seed pods of species in the genus Eucalyptus. It probably originated in Australia but has been recorded from South Africa and Italy.
