= Paragaleopsomyia =

Scientific classification
- Domain: Eukaryota
- Kingdom: Animalia
- Phylum: Arthropoda
- Class: Insecta
- Order: Hymenoptera
- Family: Eulophidae
- Subfamily: Tetrastichinae
- Genus: Paragaleopsomyia; Girault, 1917

Type species
- Paragaleopsomyia eja Girault, 1917

Species
- Paragaleopsomyia athenais (Walker, 1839); Paragaleopsomyia cecidobroter (Gordh and Hawkins, 1982); Paragaleopsomyia coxalis (Howard, 1897); Paragaleopsomyia eja Girault, 1917; Paragaleopsomyia femorata (Ashmead, 1894); Paragaleopsomyia gallicola Gahan, 1919

Genus of wasps

Paragaleopsomyia is a genus of hymenopteran insects of the family Eulophidae.
