= Holcopelte =

Scientific classification
- Domain: Eukaryota
- Kingdom: Animalia
- Phylum: Arthropoda
- Class: Insecta
- Order: Hymenoptera
- Family: Eulophidae
- Subfamily: Entedoninae
- Genus: Holcopelte; Förster, 1856

Species
- Holcopelte lenticeps (Erdős, 1958); Holcopelte stelteri Boucek, 1971

Genus of wasps

Holcopelte is a genus of hymenopteran insects of the family Eulophidae.
