= Kostjukovius =

Scientific classification
- Domain: Eukaryota
- Kingdom: Animalia
- Phylum: Arthropoda
- Class: Insecta
- Order: Hymenoptera
- Family: Eulophidae
- Subfamily: Tetrastichinae
- Genus: Kostjukovius; Graham, 1991

Type species
- Kostjukovius platycephalae (Kostjukov, 1978)

Species
- Kostjukovius grahami Lasalle 1994; Kostjukovius platycephalae (Kostjukov, 1978)

Genus of wasps

Kostjukovius is a genus of hymenopteran insects of the family Eulophidae.
