= Perthiola =

Scientific classification
- Kingdom: Animalia
- Phylum: Arthropoda
- Class: Insecta
- Order: Hymenoptera
- Family: Eulophidae
- Tribe: Anselmellini
- Genus: Perthiola; Boucek, 1988

Type species
- Perthiola mazaneci Boucek, 1988

Species
- Perthiola bouceki Reina and La Salle, 2005; Perthiola mazaneci Boucek, 1988; Perthiola moringae (Narendran, 2003)

Synonyms
- Manipurella Narendran, 2003

Genus of wasps

Perthiola is a genus of hymenopteran insects of the family Eulophidae.
