= Ceratoneura =

Scientific classification
- Kingdom: Animalia
- Phylum: Arthropoda
- Class: Insecta
- Order: Hymenoptera
- Family: Eulophidae
- Subfamily: Tetrastichinae
- Genus: Ceratoneura; Ashmead, 1894

Type species
- Ceratoneura petiolata Ashmead, 1894

Species
- See text

Genus of wasps

Ceratoneura is a genus of hymenopteran insects of the family Eulophidae.

== Species ==
- Ceratoneura aphloiae (Risbec, 1952)
- Ceratoneura gigantea Ikeda, 2001
- Ceratoneura goethei (Girault, 1915)
- Ceratoneura indi Girault, 1917
- Ceratoneura infuscata Ikeda, 2001
- Ceratoneura kalinzu Ikeda, 2001
- Ceratoneura mexicana Ashmead, 1895
- Ceratoneura pallida Ashmead, 1894
- Ceratoneura petiolata Ashmead, 1894
- Ceratoneura petiolatoides Ikeda, 2001
- Ceratoneura pretiosa Gahan, 1914
- Ceratoneura woolleyi Ikeda, 2001
