= Arastichus =

Scientific classification
- Domain: Eukaryota
- Kingdom: Animalia
- Phylum: Arthropoda
- Class: Insecta
- Order: Hymenoptera
- Family: Eulophidae
- Subfamily: Tetrastichinae
- Genus: Arastichus; Gates, Hanson, Jansen-Gonzalez & Zhang, 2022

Genus of wasps

Arastichus is a genus of hymenopteran insects of the family Eulophidae. It is only known from the neotropics. At least one of the three known species induces galls on plants in the family Araceae.
