= Ionympha =

Scientific classification
- Kingdom: Animalia
- Phylum: Arthropoda
- Class: Insecta
- Order: Hymenoptera
- Family: Eulophidae
- Subfamily: Entedoninae
- Genus: Ionympha; Graham, 1959

Type species
- Ionympha ochus (Walker, 1839)

Species
- Ionympha carne (Walker, 1839); Ionympha ochus (Walker, 1839)

Genus of wasps

Ionympha is a genus of hymenopteran insects of the family Eulophidae.
