= Stenopetius =

Scientific classification
- Domain: Eukaryota
- Kingdom: Animalia
- Phylum: Arthropoda
- Class: Insecta
- Order: Hymenoptera
- Family: Eulophidae
- Subfamily: Eulophinae
- Genus: Stenopetius; Boucek, 1988

Type species
- Stenopetius rugosus Boucek, 1988

Species
- Stenopetius jeniei Ubaidillah, 2008; Stenopetius rugosus Boucek, 1988

Genus of wasps

Stenopetius is a genus of hymenopteran insects of the family Eulophidae.
