= Gallastichus mutuus =

Scientific classification
- Domain: Eukaryota
- Kingdom: Animalia
- Phylum: Arthropoda
- Class: Insecta
- Order: Hymenoptera
- Family: Eulophidae
- Subfamily: Tetrastichinae
- Genus: Gallastichus
- Species: G. mutuus

Binomial name
- Gallastichus mutuus Rasplus and La Salle, 2011

Species of wasp

Gallastichus mutuus is a species of Afrotropical chalcid wasp in a monotypic genus from the family Eulophidae.
