= Kiggaella =

Scientific classification
- Domain: Eukaryota
- Kingdom: Animalia
- Phylum: Arthropoda
- Class: Insecta
- Order: Hymenoptera
- Family: Eulophidae
- Subfamily: Tetrastichinae
- Genus: Kiggaella; Narendran, 2005

Species
- Kiggaella oryzae Narendran, 2005

Genus of wasps

Kiggaella is a genus of hymenopteran insects belonging to the family Eulophidae. There is just one described species, Kiggaella oryzae, only known from rice paddies in Karnataka and Kerala states, India.

K. oryzae has a body length of around 1.2 mm. This insect can be distinguished from similar Minotetrastichus spp. by the lack of any grooves in the scutellum, wings more than three times as long as broad and one pair of cercal setae much longer than the others.

This insect is clearly a parasitoid although the host species as yet is unknown. Its association with paddy fields suggests it may parasitise a pest of rice which could give it potential as a biological control agent.
