= Xenaprostocetus =

Scientific classification
- Kingdom: Animalia
- Phylum: Arthropoda
- Class: Insecta
- Order: Hymenoptera
- Family: Eulophidae
- Subfamily: Tetrastichinae
- Genus: Xenaprostocetus; Graham, 1987

Species
- Xenaprostocetus pungens Graham, 1987

Genus of wasps

Xenaprostocetus is a genus of hymenopteran insects of the family Eulophidae.
