= Chaenotetrastichus =

Scientific classification
- Kingdom: Animalia
- Phylum: Arthropoda
- Class: Insecta
- Order: Hymenoptera
- Family: Eulophidae
- Subfamily: Tetrastichinae
- Genus: Chaenotetrastichus; Graham, 1987

Type species
- Chaenotetrastichus semiflavus (Girault, 1917)

Species
- Chaenotetrastichus granger (Erdös, 1958); Chaenotetrastichus semiflavus (Girault, 1917)

Genus of wasps

Chaenotetrastichus is a genus of hymenopteran insects of the family Eulophidae.
