= Aceratoneuromyia =

Scientific classification
- Domain: Eukaryota
- Kingdom: Animalia
- Phylum: Arthropoda
- Class: Insecta
- Order: Hymenoptera
- Family: Eulophidae
- Subfamily: Tetrastichinae
- Genus: Aceratoneuromyia; Girault, 1917

Type species
- Aceratoneuromyia indica (Silvestri, 1910)

Species
- Aceratoneuromyia atherigonae Ferrière, 1960; Aceratoneuromyia claridgei Graham, 1991; Aceratoneuromyia evanescens (Ratzeburg, 1848); Aceratoneuromyia fimbriata Graham, 1991; Aceratoneuromyia granularis Domenichini, 1967; Aceratoneuromyia indica (Silvestri, 1910); Aceratoneuromyia kamijoi Ikeda, 1999; Aceratoneuromyia lakica Kostjukov & Gunasheva, 2004; Aceratoneuromyia polita Graham, 1991; Aceratoneuromyia wayanadensis Narendran & Santhosh, 2005

Genus of wasps

Aceratoneuromyia is a genus of hymenopteran insects of the family Eulophidae.
