= Gasterichus =

Scientific classification
- Domain: Eukaryota
- Kingdom: Animalia
- Phylum: Arthropoda
- Class: Insecta
- Order: Hymenoptera
- Family: Eulophidae
- Subfamily: Tetrastichinae
- Genus: Gasterichus; Boucek, 1988

Species
- Gasterichus ensis Boucek, 1988

Genus of wasps

Gasterichus is a monotypic Australian genus of hymenopteran insects of the family Eulophidae.
