= Holcotetrastichus =

Scientific classification
- Domain: Eukaryota
- Kingdom: Animalia
- Phylum: Arthropoda
- Class: Insecta
- Order: Hymenoptera
- Family: Eulophidae
- Subfamily: Tetrastichinae
- Genus: Holcotetrastichus; Graham, 1987

Type species
- Holcotetrastichus rhosaces (Walker, 1839)

Species
- Holcotetrastichus manaliensis Graham, 1991; Holcotetrastichus rhosaces (Walker, 1839)

Genus of wasps

Holcotetrastichus is a genus of hymenopteran insects of the family Eulophidae. As larvae, they are parasitoids of Cassida beetles.
