= Mischotetrastichus =

Scientific classification
- Domain: Eukaryota
- Kingdom: Animalia
- Phylum: Arthropoda
- Class: Insecta
- Order: Hymenoptera
- Family: Eulophidae
- Subfamily: Tetrastichinae
- Genus: Mischotetrastichus; Graham, 1987

Type species
- Mischotetrastichus petiolatus (Erdos, 1961)

Species
- Mischotetrastichus borneichus Narendran and Lambert, 2006; Mischotetrastichus danilovitschae Kostjukov, 2000; Mischotetrastichus fuscicornis Kamijo and Ikeda, 1997; Mischotetrastichus keralensis Narendran and Rajmohana, 2015; Mischotetrastichus nadezhdae (Kostjukov, 1977); Mischotetrastichus petiolatus (Erdös, 1961); Mischotetrastichus reticulatus Kamijo and Ikeda, 1997; Mischotetrastichus yamagishii Kamijo and Ikeda, 1997

Genus of wasps

Mischotetrastichus is a genus of hymenopteran insects of the family Eulophidae.
