= Tachinobia =

Scientific classification
- Domain: Eukaryota
- Kingdom: Animalia
- Phylum: Arthropoda
- Class: Insecta
- Order: Hymenoptera
- Family: Eulophidae
- Subfamily: Tetrastichinae
- Genus: Tachinobia; Boucek, 1977

Type species
- Tachinobia repanda Boucek, 1977

Species
- Tachinobia diopsisephila (Risbec, 1956); Tachinobia repanda Boucek, 1977; Tachinobia zairensis Doganlar, 1993

Genus of wasps

Tachinobia is a genus of hymenopteran insects of the family Eulophidae. It is a hyperparasitoid of Tachinidae flies.
