= Kolopterna =

Scientific classification
- Domain: Eukaryota
- Kingdom: Animalia
- Phylum: Arthropoda
- Class: Insecta
- Order: Hymenoptera
- Family: Eulophidae
- Subfamily: Tetrastichinae
- Genus: Kolopterna; Graham, 1987

Type species
- Kolopterna salina Graham, 1987

Species
- Kolopterna aymani Doğanlar, 2013; Kolopterna blascoi Askew, 1997; Kolopterna desulcata (Kostjukov, 1978); Kolopterna grahami Kostjukov & Khomchenko, 2004; Kolopterna kasparyani Kostjukov & Kosheleva, 2014; Kolopterna kohatensis Graham, 1987; Kolopterna kurdjumovi Kostjukov & Yegorenkova, 2007; Kolopterna lao Yegorenkova & Yefremova, 2024; Kolopterna nartshukae (Kostjukov, 1976); Kolopterna nettae Yegorenkova & Yefremova, 2024; Kolopterna nikolskayae Kostjukov & Yegorenkova, 2007; Kolopterna quartensis Graham, 1987; Kolopterna salina Graham, 1987; Kolopterna sugonjaevi Kostjukov, 2014; Kolopterna turkmenica Yegorenkova & Yefremova, 2024

Genus of wasps

Kolopterna is a genus of hymenopteran insects of the family Eulophidae. Kolopterna comprises 14–15 species distributed in the Palearctic and Oriental regions All Kolopterna species are endoparasitoids of gall midges (Diptera: Cecidomyiidae) causing galls on various Chenopodiaceae.
