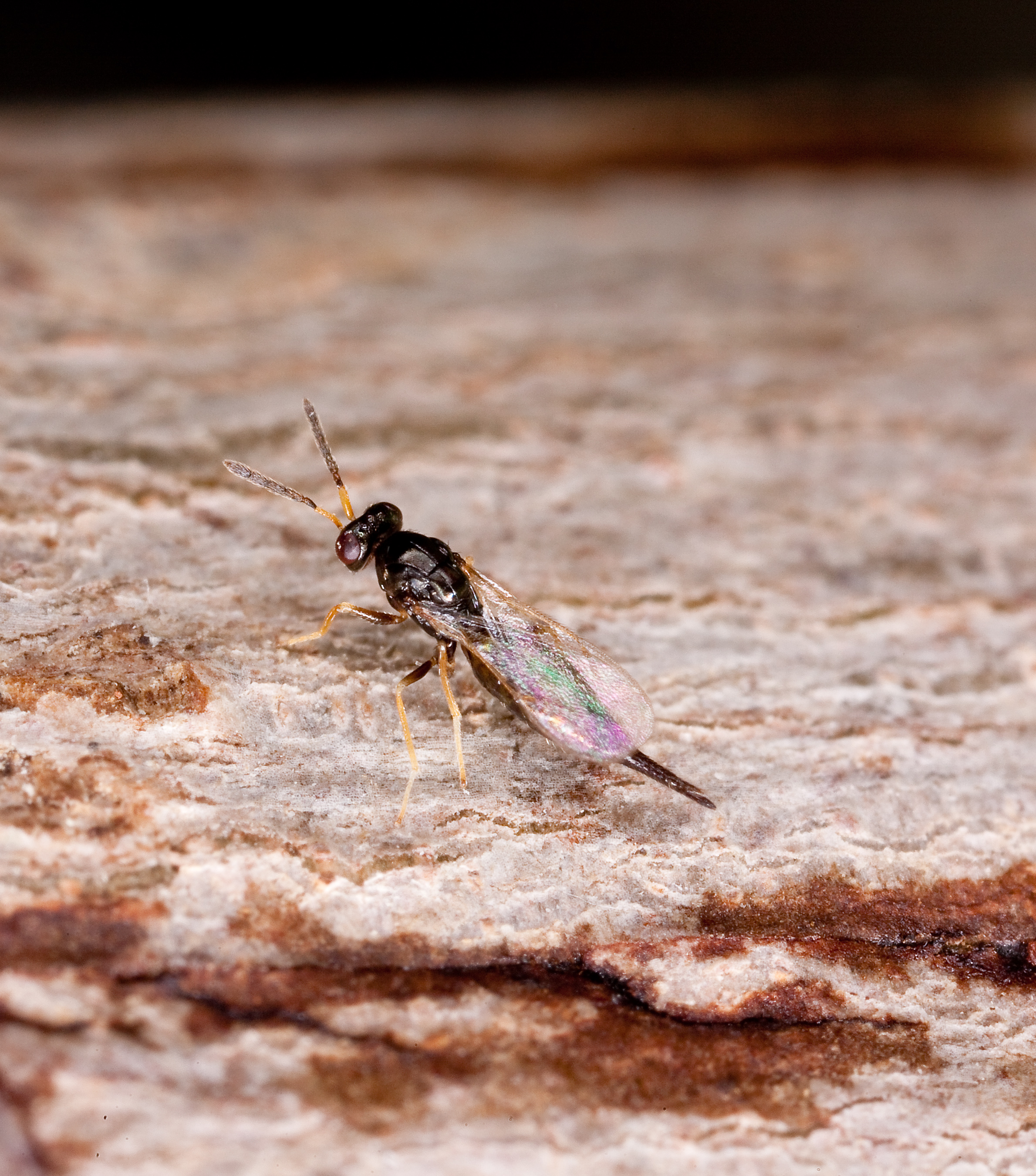
- Tetrastichus planipennisi

Scientific classification
- Kingdom: Animalia
- Phylum: Arthropoda
- Clade: Pancrustacea
- Class: Insecta
- Order: Hymenoptera
- Family: Eulophidae
- Subfamily: Tetrastichinae; Graham, 1987

Genera
- See text

= Tetrastichinae =

Subfamily of wasps

Tetrastichinae is a subfamily of the chalcid wasp family Eulophidae. It is one of the largest subfamilies of the Eulophidae containing over 100 genera and nearly 3,000 species. The species of the family Tetrastichinae are found in almost any type of terrestrial habitat and have a worldwide distribution, except Antarctica. They show a varied biology and hosts for Tetrastichinae wasps have been identified from over 100 different insect families, across 10 different orders and they have also been recorded as being parasitoids on nematodes, mites and spiders' eggs. Some species are even phytophagous, while others are inquilines and yet others are gall formers.

== Biology ==
The Tetrastichinae contains species which are mainly parasitic, although some species are known to be phytophages. Phytophagy has so far been shown to be secondary, especially in species in which the larvae are inquilines with gall forming insects and primary phytophagy has not been demonstrated. Endoparasitism is more frequent than ectoparasitiusm and taxa of either parasitic type may be gregarious or solitary. In the gregarious forms a single host may support very few parasitoids or it may host many of them, for example in a single chrysalis parasitised by Aprostocetus xanthopus over 2000 larvae were found. Sometimes hyperparasitism is shown, with the species in the genus Eutetrastichus (now synonymised with Baryscapus) in particular being hyperparasites, and hyperparasitism may be obligate but it can also occur opportunistically in response to circumstance.

Some species are highly host specific while other species appear to be able to vary their hosts, this may be due to otherwise cryptic taxa which have not yet been identifies or described. The most common hosts are insects but arachnids are also hosts for some taxa. Some of the groups within the Tetrastchinae all share similar hosts, such as the genus Tamarixia which parasitise Psylloidea while the majority of the species in Aprostocetus solely parasitise Cecidomyiidae. In other genera it is the ecological or behavioural traits of the host which are important, the Minotetrastichus species parasitise leaf miners whether these are Coleoptera, Hymenoptera or Lepidoptera; while other groups target galls irrespective of the nature of the gall former.

In many species reproduction is solely through thelytoky, i.e. female eggs are produced by parthenogenesis, while in others varying proportions of males are produced from unfertilised eggs while females are produced from fertilised eggs. This can differ within species, for example there are no records of males in North American specimens of Tetrastichus asparagi but are recorded in small numbers in European samples. Another reason for the scarcity of males is that in some taxa (e.g. Melittobia) they have been observed to stay within the host pupa on emergence and aggressively attack and kill each other until only a few survive. The surviving males then have to complete a complicated courtship ritual before they are able to copulate with the females.

== Taxonomy ==
These small wasps are rather uniform in morphology and the difficulty of preserving specimens makes them difficult to study and classify and traditionally most species were placed in a single large genus Tetrastichus until a study in 1987 by M.W.R. de V. Graham split this large genus into a number of smaller, more natural groupings, fifteen of which were named as new genera. All subsequent taxonomic work on this subfamily has been based on Graham's revision.

=== Genera ===
- Aceratoneura
- Aceratoneuromyia
- Agmostigma
- Anaprostocetus
- Apotetrastichus
- Aprostocetus
- Aprostoporoides
- Apterastichus
- Arachnoobius
- Aranobroter
- Arastichus
- Awara
- Baryscapus
- Benoitius
- Careostrix
- Ceratoneura
- Ceratoneuronella
- Ceratoneuropsis
- Chaenotetrastichus
- Chelonastichus
- Chouioia
- Chytrolestes
- Cirrospilopsis
- Citrostichus
- Comastichus
- Crataepus
- Cryptastichus
- Cucarastichus
- Dapsilothrix
- Dubiostalon
- Dzhanokmenia
- Enneastichus
- Epichrysocharis
- Eriastichus
- Euceratoneura
- Eulophoscotolinx
- Exalarius
- Exastichus
- Galeopsomyia
- Gallastichus
- Gasterichus
- Gautamiella
- Goethella
- Gyrolasomyia
- Hadranellus
- Hadrotrichodes
- Henryana
- Holcotetrastichus
- Iniostichus
- Kocaagizus
- Kocourekia
- Kolopterna
- Kostjukovius
- Lasalleola
- Leprosa
- Leptocybe
- Lisseurytomella
- Megaceratoneura
- Melittobia
- Mesofrons
- Mestocharella
- Minotetrastichus
- Mischotetrastichus
- Moona
- Narendrania
- Neoaceratoneura
- Neogasterichus
- Neohyperteles
- Neomestocharella
- Neotrichoporoides
- Nesolynx
- Oncastichus
- Oomyzus
- Oxypracetus
- Palmistichus
- Parachrysocharis
- Paragaleopsomyia
- Paraspalangia
- Paratetrastichus
- Pasohstichus
- Peckelachertus
- Pentastichus
- Petalidion
- Phymastichus
- Planotetrastichus
- Pracetus
- Pronotalia
- Puklina
- Quadrastichodella
- Quadrastichus
- Selitrichodes
- Sigmoepilachna
- Sigmophora
- Sphenolepis
- Stepanovia
- Stipecarinata
- Styotrichia
- Tachinobia
- Tamarixia
- Tetrasta
- Tetrastichomphale
- Tetrastichomyia
- Tetrastichus
- Thripastichus
- Thymus
- Xenaprostocetus
