= Kocourekia =

Scientific classification
- Kingdom: Animalia
- Phylum: Arthropoda
- Class: Insecta
- Order: Hymenoptera
- Family: Eulophidae
- Subfamily: Tetrastichinae
- Genus: Kocourekia; Boucek, 1966

Type species
- Kocourekia debilis (Ratzeburg, 1852)

Species
- Kocourekia clavigera Boucek, 1977; Kocourekia debilis (Ratzeburg, 1852)

Genus of wasps

Kocourekia is a genus of hymenopteran insects belonging to the Eulophidae family.
