= Goetheana =

Scientific classification
- Kingdom: Animalia
- Phylum: Arthropoda
- Class: Insecta
- Order: Hymenoptera
- Family: Eulophidae
- Subfamily: Tetrastichinae
- Genus: Goetheana; Girault, 1920

Type species
- Goetheana shakespearei Girault, 1920

Species
- See text

Genus of wasps

Goetheana is a genus of hymenopteran insects of the family Eulophidae. As a parasitoid of thrips, this wasp is used in biological pest control.

== Species ==
The genus includes the following species:

- Goetheana incerta Annecke, 1962
- Goetheana kobzari Gumovsky, 2016
- Goetheana pushkini Triapitsyn, 2005
- Goetheana rabelaisi Triapitsyn, 2005
- Goetheana shakespearei Girault, 1920
