= Cryptastichus sabo =

Scientific classification
- Domain: Eukaryota
- Kingdom: Animalia
- Phylum: Arthropoda
- Class: Insecta
- Order: Hymenoptera
- Family: Eulophidae
- Subfamily: Tetrastichinae
- Genus: Cryptastichus
- Species: C. sabo

Binomial name
- Cryptastichus sabo LaSalle, 1998

Species of wasp

Cryptastichus sabo is a species of Afrotropical chalcid wasp from the family Eulophidae. It is the only member of the monotypic genus Cryptastichus. It is a parasitoid of the citrus leafminer (Phyllocnistis citrella).
