= Apotetrastichus =

Scientific classification
- Domain: Eukaryota
- Kingdom: Animalia
- Phylum: Arthropoda
- Class: Insecta
- Order: Hymenoptera
- Family: Eulophidae
- Subfamily: Tetrastichinae
- Genus: Apotetrastichus; Graham, 1987

Type species
- Apotetrastichus postmarginalis Bouček, 1971

Species
- Apotetrastichus contractus (Walker, 1872); Apotetrastichus postmarginalis (Boucek, 1971); Apotetrastichus sericothorax (Szelenyi, 1973)

Genus of wasps

Apotetrastichus is a genus of hymenopteran insects of the family Eulophidae.
