= Awara (wasp) =

Scientific classification
- Domain: Eukaryota
- Kingdom: Animalia
- Phylum: Arthropoda
- Class: Insecta
- Order: Hymenoptera
- Family: Eulophidae
- Subfamily: Tetrastichinae
- Genus: Awara; Bouček, 1988

Species
- Awara oculata Bouček, 1988

Genus of wasps

Awara is a genus of hymenopteran insects of the family Eulophidae.
