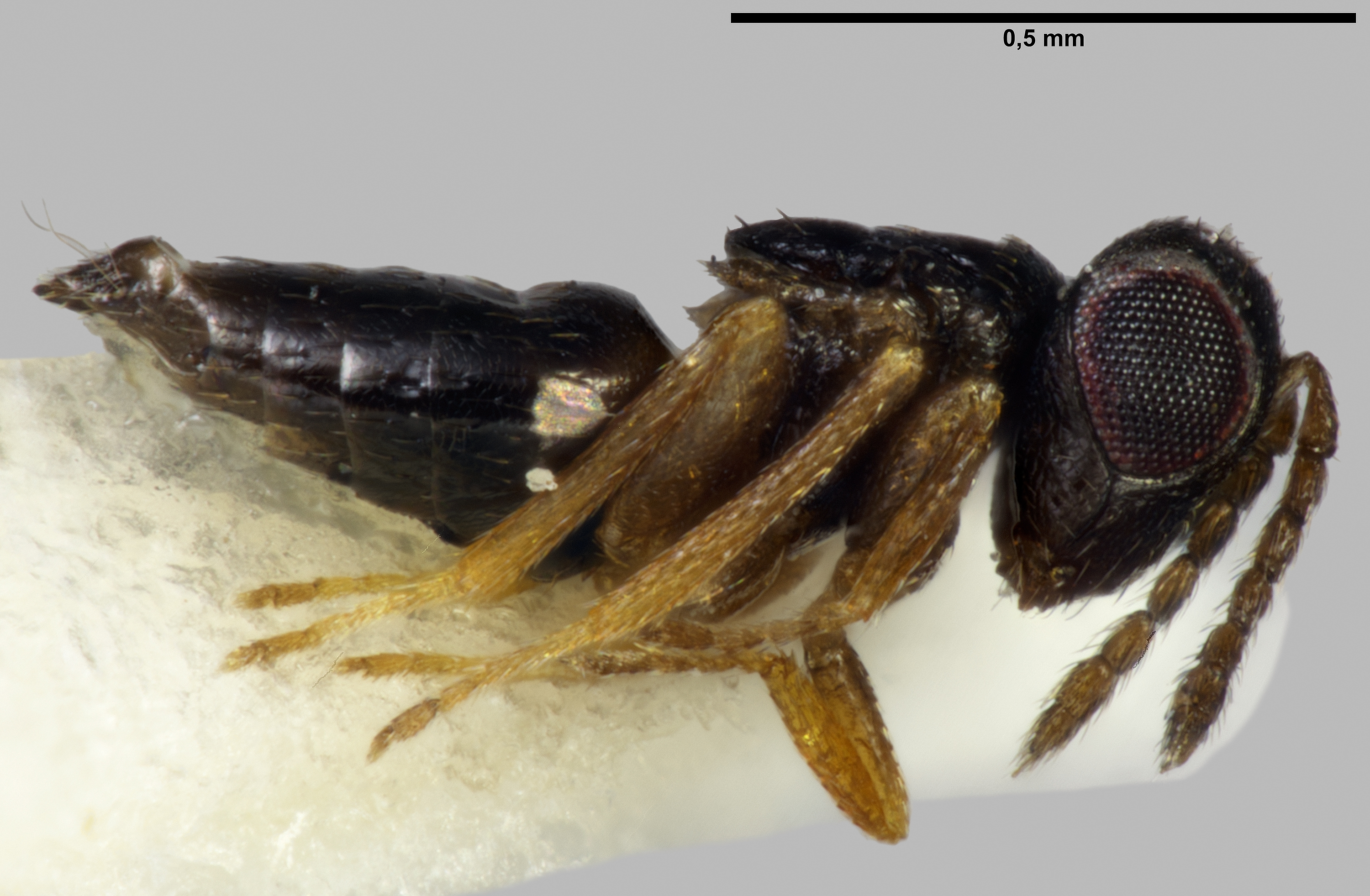
- Sphenolepis pygmaea

Scientific classification
- Domain: Eukaryota
- Kingdom: Animalia
- Phylum: Arthropoda
- Class: Insecta
- Order: Hymenoptera
- Family: Eulophidae
- Subfamily: Tetrastichinae
- Genus: Sphenolepis; Nees, 1834

Species
- Sphenolepis pygmaea Nees, 1834

Synonyms
- Peltephorus Erdös, 1961; Tetrastichus (Sphenolepis) Nees, 1834

= Sphenolepis =

Genus of wasps

Sphenolepis is a genus of hymenopteran insects of the family Eulophidae.
