= Gautamiella =

Scientific classification
- Domain: Eukaryota
- Kingdom: Animalia
- Phylum: Arthropoda
- Class: Insecta
- Order: Hymenoptera
- Family: Eulophidae
- Subfamily: Tetrastichinae
- Genus: Gautamiella; Khan, Agnihotri & Sushil, 2005

Species
- Gautamiella indica Khan, Agnihotri & Sushil, 2005

Genus of wasps

Gautamiella is a genus of hymenopteran insects of the family Eulophidae.
