= Dubiostalon =

Scientific classification
- Kingdom: Animalia
- Phylum: Arthropoda
- Class: Insecta
- Order: Hymenoptera
- Family: Eulophidae
- Subfamily: Tetrastichinae
- Genus: Dubiostalon; Szelenyi, 1981

Genus of wasps

Dubiostalon is a genus of hymenopteran insects of the family Eulophidae.
