= Thymus (wasp) =

Scientific classification
- Kingdom: Animalia
- Phylum: Arthropoda
- Class: Insecta
- Order: Hymenoptera
- Family: Eulophidae
- Subfamily: Tetrastichinae
- Genus: Thymus; Girault, 1916

Species
- Thymus albocinctus (Ashmead, 1885)

Genus of wasps

Thymus is a genus of hymenopteran insects of the family Eulophidae.
