= Sigmoepilachna =

Scientific classification
- Domain: Eukaryota
- Kingdom: Animalia
- Phylum: Arthropoda
- Class: Insecta
- Order: Hymenoptera
- Family: Eulophidae
- Subfamily: Tetrastichinae
- Genus: Sigmoepilachna; Khan, Agnihotri and Sushil, 2005

Species
- Sigmoepilachna indica Khan, Agnihotri and Sushil, 2005

Genus of wasps

Sigmoepilachna is a genus of hymenopteran insects of the family Eulophidae.
