= Entedonastichus =

Scientific classification
- Kingdom: Animalia
- Phylum: Arthropoda
- Class: Insecta
- Order: Hymenoptera
- Family: Eulophidae
- Subfamily: Entedoninae
- Genus: Entedonastichus; Girault, 1920

Type species
- Entedonastichus mirus Girault, 1920

Species
- Entedonastichus albicoxis (Szelenyi, 1982); Entedonastichus carbonarius (Erdos, 1954); Entedonastichus mirus Girault, 1920

Genus of wasps

Entedonastichus is a genus of hymenopteran insects of the family Eulophidae.
