= Oncastichus =

Scientific classification
- Kingdom: Animalia
- Phylum: Arthropoda
- Class: Insecta
- Order: Hymenoptera
- Family: Eulophidae
- Subfamily: Tetrastichinae
- Genus: Oncastichus; Headrick and LaSalle, 1995

Species
- Oncastichus goughi Headrick and LaSalle, 1995

Genus of wasps

Oncastichus is a genus of hymenopteran insects of the family Eulophidae.
