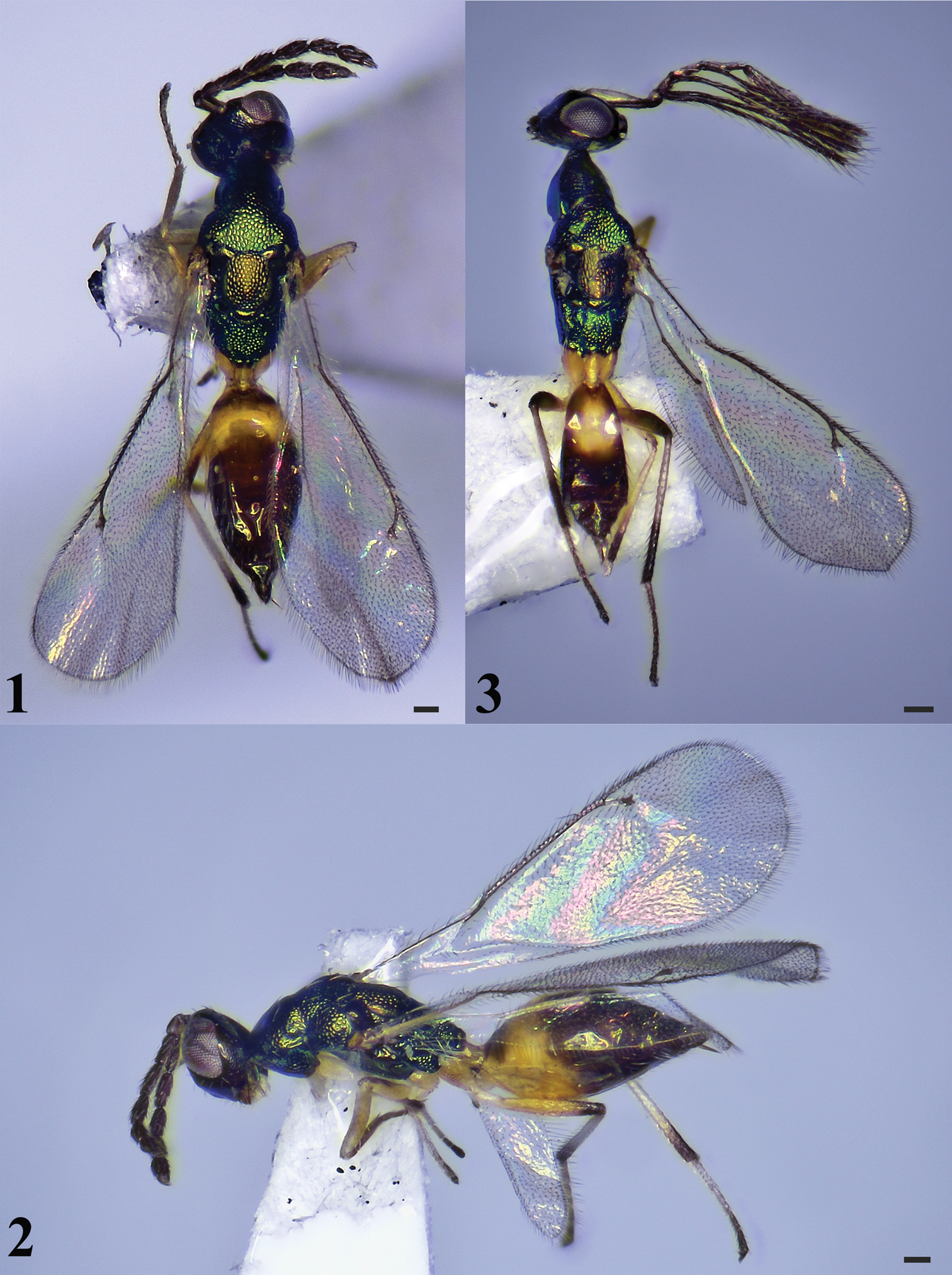
- Hemiptarsenus

Scientific classification
- Domain: Eukaryota
- Kingdom: Animalia
- Phylum: Arthropoda
- Class: Insecta
- Order: Hymenoptera
- Family: Eulophidae
- Subfamily: Eulophinae
- Genus: Hemiptarsenus; Westwood, 1833

Type species
- Hemiptarsenus fulvicollis Westwood, 1833

Species
- 20 Species

= Hemiptarsenus =

Genus of wasps

Hemiptarsenus is a genus of hymenopteran insects of the family Eulophidae.
