= Lasalleola =

Scientific classification
- Domain: Eukaryota
- Kingdom: Animalia
- Phylum: Arthropoda
- Class: Insecta
- Order: Hymenoptera
- Family: Eulophidae
- Subfamily: Tetrastichinae
- Genus: Lasalleola; Narendran, 2003

Species
- Lasalleola obsona Narendran, 2003

Genus of wasps

Lasalleola is a genus of hymenopteran insects of the family Eulophidae.
