= Danuviella =

Scientific classification
- Domain: Eukaryota
- Kingdom: Animalia
- Phylum: Arthropoda
- Class: Insecta
- Order: Hymenoptera
- Family: Eulophidae
- Subfamily: Eulophinae
- Genus: Danuviella; Erdos, 1958

Species
- Danuviella subplana Erdos, 1958

Genus of wasps

Danuviella is a genus of hymenopteran insects of the family Eulophidae.
