= Selitrichodes =

Scientific classification
- Kingdom: Animalia
- Phylum: Arthropoda
- Class: Insecta
- Order: Hymenoptera
- Family: Eulophidae
- Subfamily: Tetrastichinae
- Genus: Selitrichodes; Girault, 1913

Type species
- Selitrichodes fasciativentris Girault, 1913

Species
- Selitrichodes auriflavus (Girault, 1915); Selitrichodes casuarinae Fisher and La Salle, 2013; Selitrichodes consobrinus (Girault, 1913); Selitrichodes fasciativentris Girault, 1913; Selitrichodes flavus (Girault, 1913); Selitrichodes giraulti Kim and La Salle, 2008; Selitrichodes globulus La Salle and Gates, 2009; Selitrichodes kryceri Kim and La Salle, 2008; Selitrichodes multifasciatus (Girault, 1915); Selitrichodes neseri Kelly and La Salle, 2012; Selitrichodes quinqnigrimaculae (Girault, 1915); Selitrichodes secus (Girault, 1915); Selitrichodes tricolor (Girault, 1915); Selitrichodes utilis Fisher and La Salle, 2014; Selitrichodes variegatus (Girault, 1915); Selitrichodes varigatus Girault, 1913

Synonyms
- Epomphaloides Girault, 1913; Zagrammosomoides Girault, 1913

Genus of wasps

Selitrichodes is a genus of hymenopteran insects of the family Eulophidae, most of which are parasitoids associated with gall producing insects on Eucalyptus.
