= Comastichus =

Scientific classification
- Kingdom: Animalia
- Phylum: Arthropoda
- Class: Insecta
- Order: Hymenoptera
- Family: Eulophidae
- Subfamily: Tetrastichinae
- Genus: Comastichus; LaSalle, 1994

Species
- Comastichus zopheros LaSalle, 1994

Genus of wasps

Comastichus is a genus of hymenopteran insects of the family Eulophidae.
