= Tetrastichomphale =

Scientific classification
- Kingdom: Animalia
- Phylum: Arthropoda
- Class: Insecta
- Order: Hymenoptera
- Family: Eulophidae
- Subfamily: Tetrastichinae
- Genus: Tetrastichomphale; Girault, 1935

Species
- Tetrastichomphale multivena Girault, 1935

Genus of wasps

Tetrastichomphale is a genus of hymenopteran insects of the family Eulophidae.
