= Anselmella =

Scientific classification
- Domain: Eukaryota
- Kingdom: Animalia
- Phylum: Arthropoda
- Class: Insecta
- Order: Hymenoptera
- Family: Eulophidae
- Tribe: Anselmellini
- Genus: Anselmella; Girault, 1926

Type species
- Anselmella miltoni Girault, 1926

Species
- Anselmella kerrichi (Narayanan, Subba Rao & Patel, 1958); Anselmella malacia Xiao & Huang, 2006; Anselmella miltoni Girault, 1926; Anselmella oculata Boucek, 1988

Genus of wasps

Anselmella is a genus of hymenopteran insects of the family Eulophidae.
