= Paratetrastichus =

Scientific classification
- Domain: Eukaryota
- Kingdom: Animalia
- Phylum: Arthropoda
- Class: Insecta
- Order: Hymenoptera
- Family: Eulophidae
- Subfamily: Tetrastichinae
- Genus: Paratetrastichus; Yoshimoto and Ishii, 1965

Species
- Paratetrastichus ponapensis Yoshimoto and Ishii, 1965

Genus of wasps

Paratetrastichus is a genus of hymenopteran insects of the family Eulophidae.
