= Neohyperteles =

Scientific classification
- Domain: Eukaryota
- Kingdom: Animalia
- Phylum: Arthropoda
- Class: Insecta
- Order: Hymenoptera
- Family: Eulophidae
- Subfamily: Tetrastichinae
- Genus: Neohyperteles; De Santis, 1957

Type species
- Neohyperteles euplectriformis De Santis, 1957

Species
- Neohyperteles euplectriformis De Santis, 1957; Neohyperteles seminarius De Santis, Urban and Graf, 1973

Genus of wasps

Neohyperteles is a genus of hymenopteran insects of the family Eulophidae.
