= Oxypracetus =

Scientific classification
- Kingdom: Animalia
- Phylum: Arthropoda
- Class: Insecta
- Order: Hymenoptera
- Family: Eulophidae
- Subfamily: Tetrastichinae
- Genus: Oxypracetus; LaSalle, 1994

Species
- Oxypracetus opacus LaSalle, 1994

Genus of wasps

Oxypracetus is a genus of hymenopteran insects of the family Eulophidae.
