= Cirrospilopsis =

Scientific classification
- Domain: Eukaryota
- Kingdom: Animalia
- Phylum: Arthropoda
- Class: Insecta
- Order: Hymenoptera
- Family: Eulophidae
- Subfamily: Tetrastichinae
- Genus: Cirrospilopsis; Brèthes, 1913

Species
- Cirrospilopsis verticillata Brèthes, 1913

Genus of wasps

Cirrospilopsis is a genus of hymenopteran insects of the family Eulophidae.
