= Baryscapus =

Scientific classification
- Domain: Eukaryota
- Kingdom: Animalia
- Phylum: Arthropoda
- Class: Insecta
- Order: Hymenoptera
- Family: Eulophidae
- Subfamily: Tetrastichinae
- Genus: Baryscapus; Förster, 1856

Type species
- Baryscapus racemariae (Ashmead, 1886)

Species
- 113 species

Genus of wasps

Baryscapus is a genus of hymenopteran insects of the family Eulophidae. Species in this genus are endoparasitic, meaning they develop within the body of another insect, with insect hosts being as varied as Hemiptera, Neuroptera, Coleoptera, Lepidoptera, Diptera, or other Hymenoptera.
