= Henryana =

Scientific classification
- Domain: Eukaryota
- Kingdom: Animalia
- Phylum: Arthropoda
- Class: Insecta
- Order: Hymenoptera
- Family: Eulophidae
- Subfamily: Tetrastichinae
- Genus: Henryana; Yoshimoto, 1983

Species
- Henryana magnifica Yoshimoto, 1983

Genus of wasps

Henryana is a monotypic Nearctic and Neotropical genus of Hymenopteran insects of the family Eulophidae.
