= Paraspalangia =

Scientific classification
- Domain: Eukaryota
- Kingdom: Animalia
- Phylum: Arthropoda
- Class: Insecta
- Order: Hymenoptera
- Family: Eulophidae
- Subfamily: Tetrastichinae
- Genus: Paraspalangia; Ashmead, 1904

Species
- Paraspalangia annulipes Ashmead, 1904

Genus of wasps

Paraspalangia is a genus of hymenopteran insects of the family Eulophidae.
