= Arachnoobius =

Scientific classification
- Domain: Eukaryota
- Kingdom: Animalia
- Phylum: Arthropoda
- Class: Insecta
- Order: Hymenoptera
- Family: Eulophidae
- Subfamily: Tetrastichinae
- Genus: Arachnoobius; Bouček, 1988

Species
- Arachnoobius austini Bouček, 1988

Genus of wasps

Arachnoobius is a genus of hymenopteran insects of the family Eulophidae.
