= Iniostichus =

Scientific classification
- Domain: Eukaryota
- Kingdom: Animalia
- Phylum: Arthropoda
- Class: Insecta
- Order: Hymenoptera
- Family: Eulophidae
- Subfamily: Tetrastichinae
- Genus: Iniostichus; Kamijo & Ikeda, 1997

Type species
- Iniostichus kumatai Kamijo & Ikeda, 1997

Species
- Iniostichus kamijoi Narendran, 2004; Iniostichus kumatai Kamijo & Ikeda, 1997; Iniostichus longipetiolatus Kamijo & Ikeda, 1997; Iniostichus nigricoxa Kamijo & Ikeda, 1997

Genus of wasps

Iniostichus is a genus of hymenopteran insects of the family Eulophidae.
