= Chouioia =

Scientific classification
- Domain: Eukaryota
- Kingdom: Animalia
- Phylum: Arthropoda
- Class: Insecta
- Order: Hymenoptera
- Family: Eulophidae
- Subfamily: Tetrastichinae
- Genus: Chouioia; Yang, 1989

Species
- Chouioia cunea Yang, 1989

Genus of wasps

Chouioia is a genus of endoparasitic wasp of the family Eulophidae. Chouioia cunea is considered an important parasite of the fall webworm in China, where the moth is an invasive species.
