= Stepanovia =

Scientific classification
- Domain: Eukaryota
- Kingdom: Animalia
- Phylum: Arthropoda
- Class: Insecta
- Order: Hymenoptera
- Family: Eulophidae
- Subfamily: Tetrastichinae
- Genus: Stepanovia (Kostjukov, 1995)

Type species
- Stepanovia aspectabilis (Kostjukov, 1995)

Species
- Stepanovia aspectabilis (Kostjukov, 1995); Stepanovia aurantiaca (Ratzeburg, 1852); Stepanovia avetjanae (Kostjukov, 1978); Stepanovia eurytomae (Nees, 1834); Stepanovia grandicauda (Kostjukov, 1995); Stepanovia kubanica Kostjukov, 2009; Stepanovia longiclava (Kostjukov, 1995); Stepanovia nigriventris (Kostjukov, 1995); Stepanovia rosae Boyadzhiev and Todorov, 2013

Genus of wasps

Stepanovia is a genus of hymenopteran insects of the family Eulophidae.
