= Aranobroter =

Scientific classification
- Domain: Eukaryota
- Kingdom: Animalia
- Phylum: Arthropoda
- Class: Insecta
- Order: Hymenoptera
- Family: Eulophidae
- Subfamily: Tetrastichinae
- Genus: Aranobroter; LaSalle, 1990

Type species
- Aranobroter rayorae LaSalle, 1990

Species
- Aranobroter rayorae LaSalle, 1990; Aranobroter grioti (Blanchard, 1950)

Genus of wasps

Aranobroter is a genus of hymenopteran insects of the family Eulophidae.
