= Hadrotrichodes =

Scientific classification
- Domain: Eukaryota
- Kingdom: Animalia
- Phylum: Arthropoda
- Class: Insecta
- Order: Hymenoptera
- Family: Eulophidae
- Subfamily: Tetrastichinae
- Genus: Hadrotrichodes; LaSalle, 1994

Species
- Hadrotrichodes waukheon LaSalle, 1994

Genus of wasps

Hadrotrichodes is a genus of hymenopteran insects of the family Eulophidae. It is a parasite of Marmara gulosa larvae, with multiple wasps able to emerge from one caterpillar.
