= Citrostichus =

Scientific classification
- Kingdom: Animalia
- Phylum: Arthropoda
- Clade: Pancrustacea
- Class: Insecta
- Order: Hymenoptera
- Family: Eulophidae
- Subfamily: Tetrastichinae
- Genus: Citrostichus; Boucek, 1988

Type species
- Citrostichus phyllocnistoides (Narayanan, 1960)

Species
- Citrostichus dolichogaster Sheng and Wang, 1993; Citrostichus phyllocnistoides (Narayanan, 1960)

Genus of wasps

Citrostichus is a genus of hymenopteran insects of the family Eulophidae.
