= Gyrolasomyia =

Scientific classification
- Domain: Eukaryota
- Kingdom: Animalia
- Phylum: Arthropoda
- Class: Insecta
- Order: Hymenoptera
- Family: Eulophidae
- Subfamily: Tetrastichinae
- Genus: Gyrolasomyia; Girault, 1913

Type species
- Gyrolasomyia washingtoni Girault, 1913

Species
- Gyrolasomyia asticha Boucek, 1988; Gyrolasomyia washingtoni Girault, 1913

Genus of wasps

Gyrolasomyia is a genus of hymenopteran insects of the family Eulophidae.
