= Crataepus =

Scientific classification
- Domain: Eukaryota
- Kingdom: Animalia
- Phylum: Arthropoda
- Class: Insecta
- Order: Hymenoptera
- Family: Eulophidae
- Subfamily: Tetrastichinae
- Genus: Crataepus; Förster, 1878

Species
- Crataepus marbis (Walker, 1839)

Genus of wasps

Crataepus is a genus of hymenopteran insects of the family Eulophidae.
