= Palmistichus =

Scientific classification
- Domain: Eukaryota
- Kingdom: Animalia
- Phylum: Arthropoda
- Class: Insecta
- Order: Hymenoptera
- Family: Eulophidae
- Subfamily: Tetrastichinae
- Genus: Palmistichus; Delvare and LaSalle, 1993

Type species
- Palmistichus elaeisis Delvare and LaSalle, 1993

Species
- Palmistichus elaeisis Delvare and LaSalle, 1993; Palmistichus ixtlilxochitli (Girault, 1920)

Genus of wasps

Palmistichus is a genus of hymenopteran insects of the family Eulophidae.
