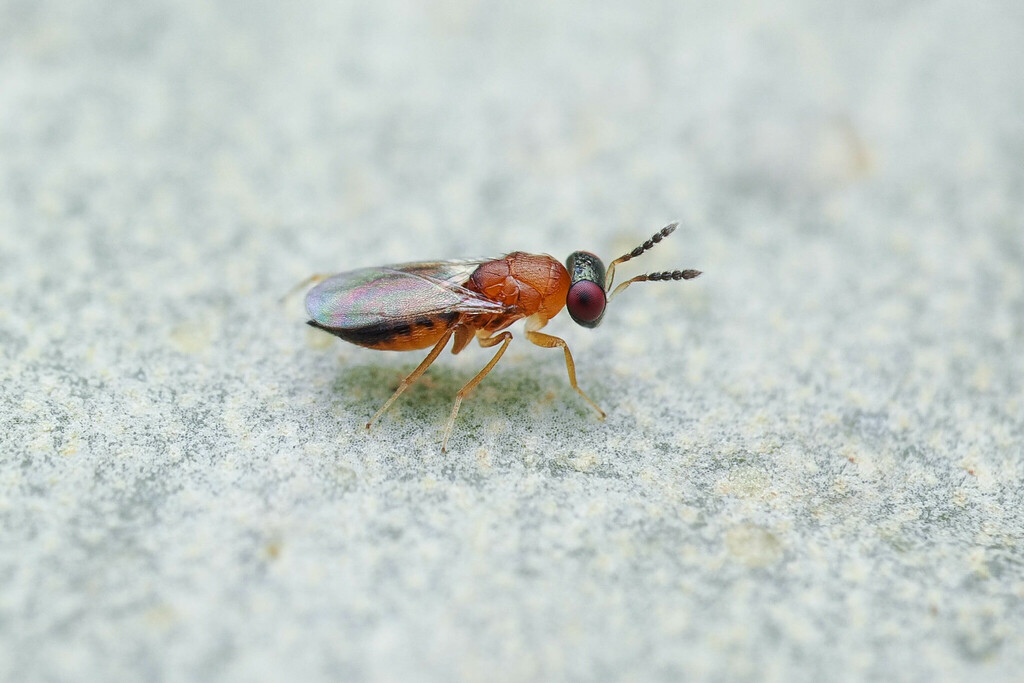
- Nesolynx thymus from Queensland, Australia

Scientific classification
- Kingdom: Animalia
- Phylum: Arthropoda
- Clade: Pancrustacea
- Class: Insecta
- Order: Hymenoptera
- Family: Eulophidae
- Subfamily: Tetrastichinae
- Genus: Nesolynx; Ashmead, 1905

Type species
- Nesolynx flavipes Ashmead, 1905

Species
- 17 species

= Nesolynx =

Genus of wasps

Nesolynx is a genus of hymenopteran insects of the family Eulophidae. Hosts for one species, N. thymus, are known to be flies.

== Articles ==
A.S. Aruna & D. Manjunath (2009) Reproductive performance of Nesolynx thymus (Hymenoptera: Eulophidae), in relation to age of Musca domestica (Diptera: Muscidae), Biocontrol Science and Technology, 19:2, 139–149, DOI: 10.1080/09583150802624303.

S. Aruna, A & Manjunath, D. (2010). Reproductive performance of Nesolynx thymus (Hymenoptera: Eulophidae) as influenced by host (Musca domestica) size. BioControl. 55. 245–252. 10.1007/s10526-009-9256-3.

H.M. Prakash, A. Prathima, H.C. Huchesh (2014) Sex ratio distortion in the Nesolynx thymus (Hymenoptera: Eulophidae), an ecto-pupal parasitoid of uzifly, Exorista sorbillans (Diptera: Tachinidae), Eur. J. Entomol. 111(4).
