= Megaceratoneura =

Scientific classification
- Domain: Eukaryota
- Kingdom: Animalia
- Phylum: Arthropoda
- Class: Insecta
- Order: Hymenoptera
- Family: Eulophidae
- Subfamily: Tetrastichinae
- Genus: Megaceratoneura; Girault, 1917

Species
- Megaceratoneura inusitata Girault, 1917

Genus of wasps

Megaceratoneura is a genus of hymenopteran insects of the family Eulophidae.
