= Guptaiella =

Scientific classification
- Domain: Eukaryota
- Kingdom: Animalia
- Phylum: Arthropoda
- Class: Insecta
- Order: Hymenoptera
- Family: Eulophidae
- Subfamily: Eulophinae
- Genus: Guptaiella; Khan & Sushil, 1998

Species
- Guptaiella indica Khan & Sushil, 1998

Genus of wasps

Guptaiella is a genus of hymenopteran insects of the family Eulophidae.
