= Phymastichus =

Scientific classification
- Kingdom: Animalia
- Phylum: Arthropoda
- Class: Insecta
- Order: Hymenoptera
- Family: Eulophidae
- Subfamily: Tetrastichinae
- Genus: Phymastichus; LaSalle, 1990

Type species
- Phymastichus coffea LaSalle, 1990

Species
- Phymastichus coffea LaSalle, 1990; Phymastichus xylebori ^{LaSalle, 1995}

Genus of wasps

Phymastichus is a genus of hymenopteran insects of the family Eulophidae.
