= Aprostoporoides =

Scientific classification
- Domain: Eukaryota
- Kingdom: Animalia
- Phylum: Arthropoda
- Class: Insecta
- Order: Hymenoptera
- Family: Eulophidae
- Subfamily: Tetrastichinae
- Genus: Aprostoporoides; Narendran, 2004

Type species
- Aprostoporoides curiosus Narendran, 2004

Species
- Aprostoporoides curiosus Narendran, 2004; Aprostoporoides manjericus Narendran, 2004

Genus of wasps

Aprostoporoides is a small Indomalayan genus of hymenopteran insects of the family Eulophidae which was described in 2004 with two newly described species from Kerala.
