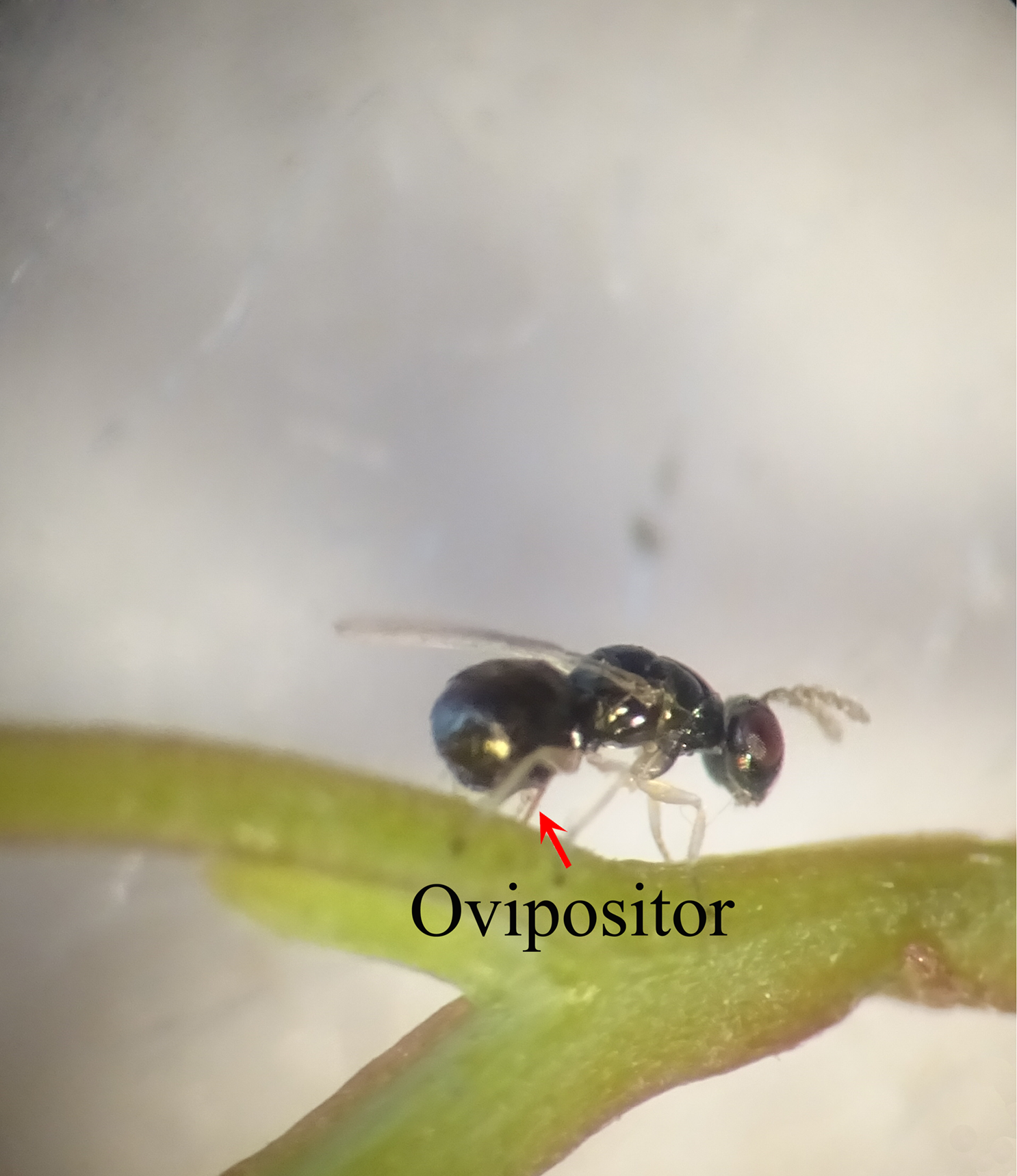
- Female Leptocybe invasa inserting ovipositor into the petiole of Eucalyptus tree

Scientific classification
- Kingdom: Animalia
- Phylum: Arthropoda
- Clade: Pancrustacea
- Class: Insecta
- Order: Hymenoptera
- Family: Eulophidae
- Genus: Leptocybe
- Species: L. invasa

Binomial name
- Leptocybe invasa Fisher & La Salle, 2004

= Leptocybe invasa =

Species of wasp

Leptocybe invasa, the blue gum chalcid wasp or eucalyptus gall wasp, is a chalcid wasp which is the only species in the monotypic genus Leptocybe in the subfamily Tetrastichinae, of the family Eulophidae. It is a gall wasp which causes the formation of galls on a number of species of Eucalyptus, it was described in 2004 after galls were found in river red gums (Eucalyptus camaldulensis) in the Mediterranean and Middle East and has since been found to be a widespread species where its host trees are planted. It is indigenous to Australia.

== Description ==
This tiny wasp is just over one millimeter in length. Its body is brown with a slight blue to green iridescence. Parts of the legs are yellowish in color.

== Distribution ==
Leptocybe invasa is native to Queensland, Australia where its exact distribution has yet to be determined. It has now been found as an invasive species in eucalypts in northern, eastern and southern Africa, Asia, the Pacific Region, Europe as far north as the United Kingdom, southern Asia, southern South America, the Middle East, Mexico and the United States. It appears to be spreading.

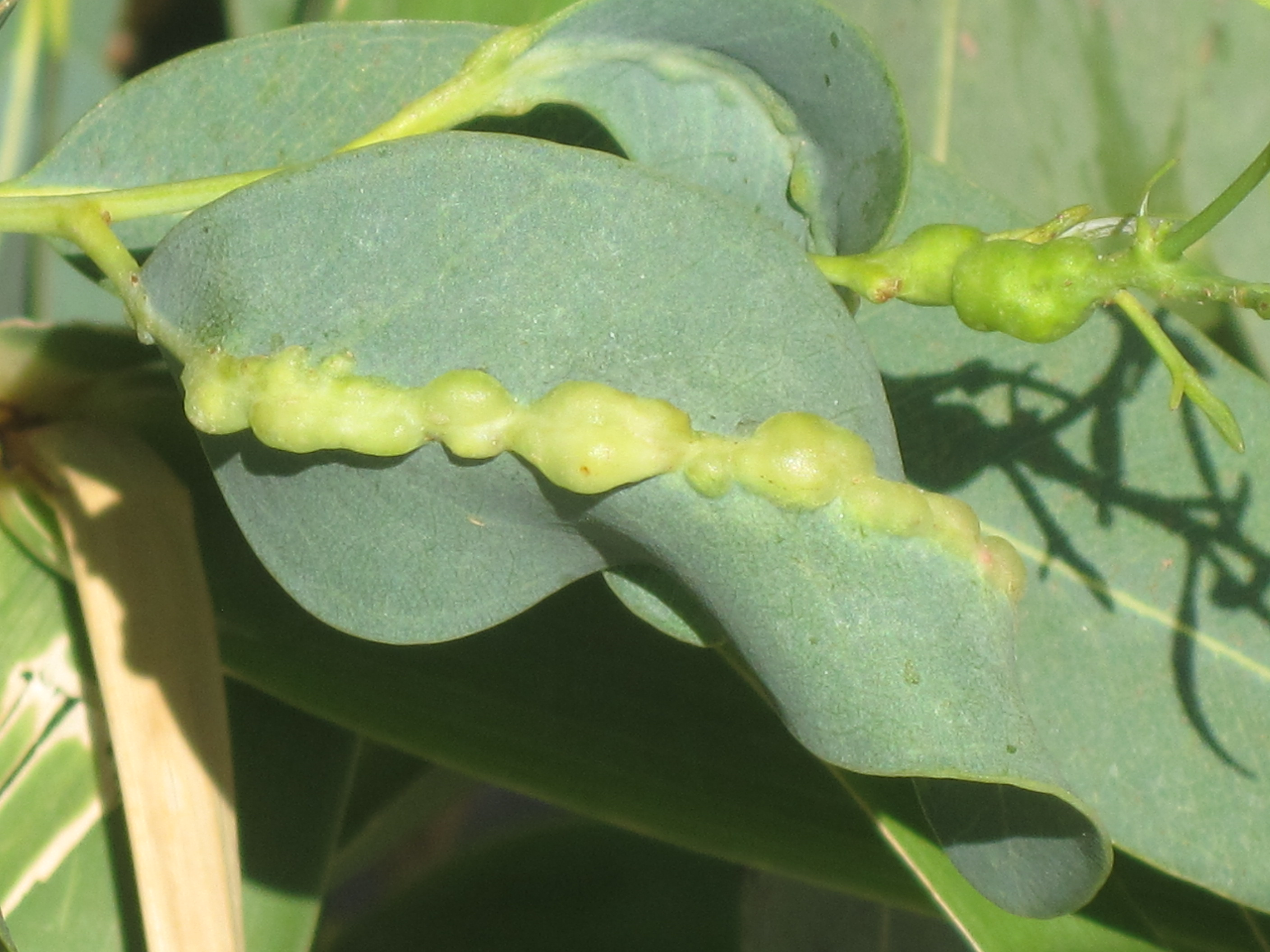
Developing galls

=== Discovery ===
L. invasa was discovered in 2000 when river red gums in the Middle East and Mediterranean began developing disfiguring galls. The damage became severe enough to cause crop losses in tree plantations. Galls were collected and a previously undescribed species of chalcid wasp emerged. In 2004 it was described to science as Leptocybe invasa.

== Biology ==
The adult female injects a neat line of minute eggs in the epidermis of new leaf buds on eucalyptus trees. The leaf tissue may exude a whitish sap, which covers the oviposition site. Heavy wasp infestations can kill new buds on the trees. If the bud survives it develops a layer of corky tissue within one to two weeks of oviposition. This corky scar widens and becomes glossy in texture. It turns from green to pinkish to dark pink or red in color. It loses its glossy texture and turns dull brown or reddish. The chalcid wasp larva develops inside the gall and when it emerges as an adult insect the gall is spherical and up to 2.7 millimeters wide. During an infestation there are usually 3 to 6 galls per leaf, but up to 65 have been observed on a single leaf. The adult wasps emerge from the galls after growing inside for 3–4 months. In temperate areas there may be 2-3 generations of adults in a year but in the tropics there can be as many as 6 generations. The females can reproduce asexually by thelytokous reproduction and live for up to 7 days, males are rare and the asexual reproduction allows L. invasa to rapidly increase its population size.

Several eucalyptus species are susceptible to the wasp. Host species include bangalay (Eucalyptus botryoides), apple box (E. bridgesiana), Tasmanian blue gum (E. globulus), cider gum (E. gunnii), flooded gum (E. grandis), swamp mahogany (E. robusta), Sydney blue gum (E. saligna), forest red gum (E. tereticornis), and manna gum (E. viminalis).

== Control ==
Possible biological agents for L. invasa have been actively searched for and numerous hymenopteran parasitoids of L. invasa were identified; in one study in China these were Quadrastichus mendeli, Aprostocetus causalis and Megastigmus viggianii, and in another study in Israel these were Megastigmus zvimendeli, Megastigmus lawsoni, Selitrichodes kryceri and Quadrastichus mendeli.

Quadrastichus mendeli has a short developmental time and has proven to be an especially effective control agent in the Mediterranean Basin. Selitrichodes neseri is another eulophid ectoparasitoid which is species specific to L. invasa and was discovered in its native Australian range in 2014 and show potential as a biological control agent on L. invasa.
