= Kocaagizus =

Scientific classification
- Domain: Eukaryota
- Kingdom: Animalia
- Phylum: Arthropoda
- Class: Insecta
- Order: Hymenoptera
- Family: Eulophidae
- Subfamily: Tetrastichinae
- Genus: Kocaagizus; Doganlar, 1993

Species
- Kocaagizus pirireisi Doganlar, 1993

Genus of wasps

Kocaagizus is a genus of hymenopteran insects of the family Eulophidae.
