= Exastichus =

Scientific classification
- Domain: Eukaryota
- Kingdom: Animalia
- Phylum: Arthropoda
- Class: Insecta
- Order: Hymenoptera
- Family: Eulophidae
- Subfamily: Tetrastichinae
- Genus: Exastichus; LaSalle, 1994

Species
- Exastichus odontos LaSalle, 1994

Genus of wasps

Exastichus is a genus of hymenopteran insects of the family Eulophidae.
