= Pentastichus =

Scientific classification
- Kingdom: Animalia
- Phylum: Arthropoda
- Class: Insecta
- Order: Hymenoptera
- Family: Eulophidae
- Subfamily: Tetrastichinae
- Genus: Pentastichus; Ashmead, 1894

Type species
- Pentastichus xanthopus Ashmead, 1894

Species
- Pentastichus ithacus (Moser, 1965); Pentastichus longior Howard, 1897; Pentastichus xanthopus Ashmead, 1894

Synonyms
- Hypertetrastichus Moser, 1965; Tetrastichus (Pentastichus) Ashmead, 1894

Genus of wasps

Pentastichus is a genus of hymenopteran insects of the family Eulophidae.
