= Neogasterichus =

Scientific classification
- Domain: Eukaryota
- Kingdom: Animalia
- Phylum: Arthropoda
- Class: Insecta
- Order: Hymenoptera
- Family: Eulophidae
- Subfamily: Tetrastichinae
- Genus: Neogasterichus; Narendran, 2003

Type species
- Neogasterichus longigastris Narendran, 2003

Species
- Neogasterichus achalicus Narendran and Sureshan, 2010; Neogasterichus bhubaneswaricus Narendran and Sureshan, 2010; Neogasterichus dulciculus Narendran, 2003; Neogasterichus longigastris Narendran, 2003

Genus of wasps

Neogasterichus is a genus of hymenopteran insects of the family Eulophidae.
