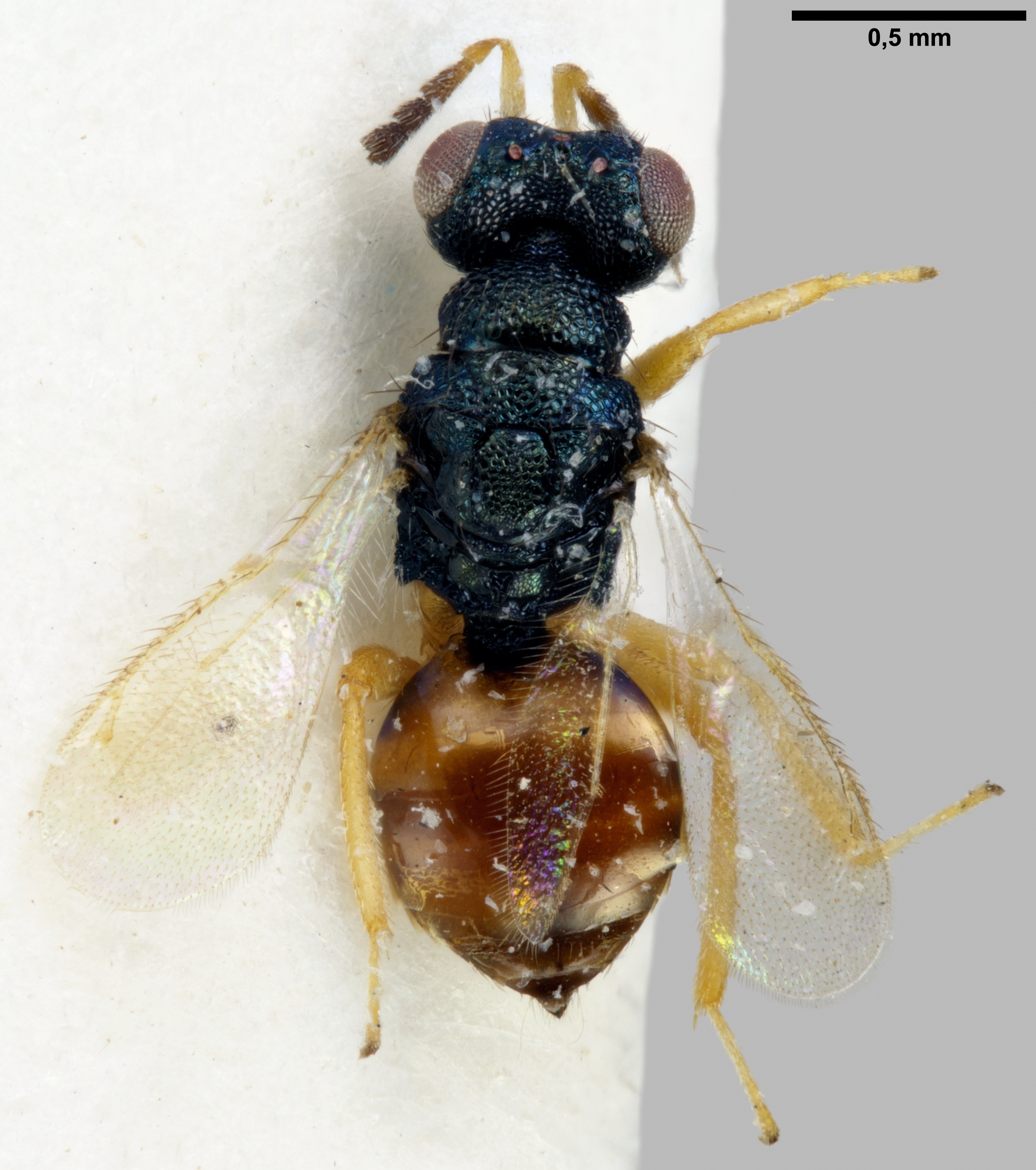
- female Bryopezus brevipennis

Scientific classification
- Domain: Eukaryota
- Kingdom: Animalia
- Phylum: Arthropoda
- Class: Insecta
- Order: Hymenoptera
- Family: Eulophidae
- Subfamily: Eulophinae
- Genus: Bryopezus; Erdos, 1951

Species
- Bryopezus brevipennis Erdos, 1951

= Bryopezus =

Genus of wasps

Bryopezus is a genus of hymenopteran insects of the family Eulophidae.
