= Mestocharella =

Scientific classification
- Kingdom: Animalia
- Phylum: Arthropoda
- Clade: Pancrustacea
- Class: Insecta
- Order: Hymenoptera
- Family: Eulophidae
- Subfamily: Tetrastichinae
- Genus: Mestocharella; Girault, 1913

Type species
- Mestocharella feralis Girault, 1913

Species
- 12 species

Genus of wasps

Mestocharella is a genus of hymenopteran insects of the family Eulophidae.
