= Platytetracampe =

Scientific classification
- Kingdom: Animalia
- Phylum: Arthropoda
- Class: Insecta
- Order: Hymenoptera
- Family: Eulophidae
- Tribe: Platytetracampini
- Genus: Platytetracampe; Girault, 1915

Species
- Platytetracampe funiculus Girault, 1915

Genus of wasps

Platytetracampe is a genus of hymenopteran insects of the family Eulophidae.
