= Neomestocharella =

Scientific classification
- Kingdom: Animalia
- Phylum: Arthropoda
- Clade: Pancrustacea
- Class: Insecta
- Order: Hymenoptera
- Family: Eulophidae
- Subfamily: Tetrastichinae
- Genus: Neomestocharella; Narendran and Fousi, 2002

Species
- Neomestocharella keralensis Narendran and Fousi, 2002

Genus of wasps

Neomestocharella is a genus of hymenopteran insects of the family Eulophidae. It can be found in India.
