= Euceratoneura =

Scientific classification
- Domain: Eukaryota
- Kingdom: Animalia
- Phylum: Arthropoda
- Class: Insecta
- Order: Hymenoptera
- Family: Eulophidae
- Subfamily: Tetrastichinae
- Genus: Euceratoneura; Girault, 1920

Species
- Euceratoneura shellyi Girault, 1920

Genus of wasps

Euceratoneura is a genus of hymenopteran insects of the family Eulophidae.
