= Pentastichodes =

Scientific classification
- Kingdom: Animalia
- Phylum: Arthropoda
- Class: Insecta
- Order: Hymenoptera
- Family: Eulophidae
- Genus: Pentastichodes

Genus of wasps

Pentastichodes is a genus of hymenopteran insects of the family Eulophidae.
