= Parachrysocharis =

Scientific classification
- Kingdom: Animalia
- Phylum: Arthropoda
- Class: Insecta
- Order: Hymenoptera
- Family: Eulophidae
- Subfamily: Tetrastichinae
- Genus: Parachrysocharis; Girault, 1913

Type species
- Parachrysocharis javensis Girault, 1913

Species
- Parachrysocharis anomalococci (Khan and Shafee, 1980); Parachrysocharis javensis Girault, 1913; Parachrysocharis malabarensis Narendran, 2008; Parachrysocharis pantnagarensis Khan, Agnihotri and Sushil, 2005; Parachrysocharis saccharanus Ahamad & Zeya, 2025

Genus of wasps

Parachrysocharis is a genus of hymenopteran insects of the family Eulophidae.
