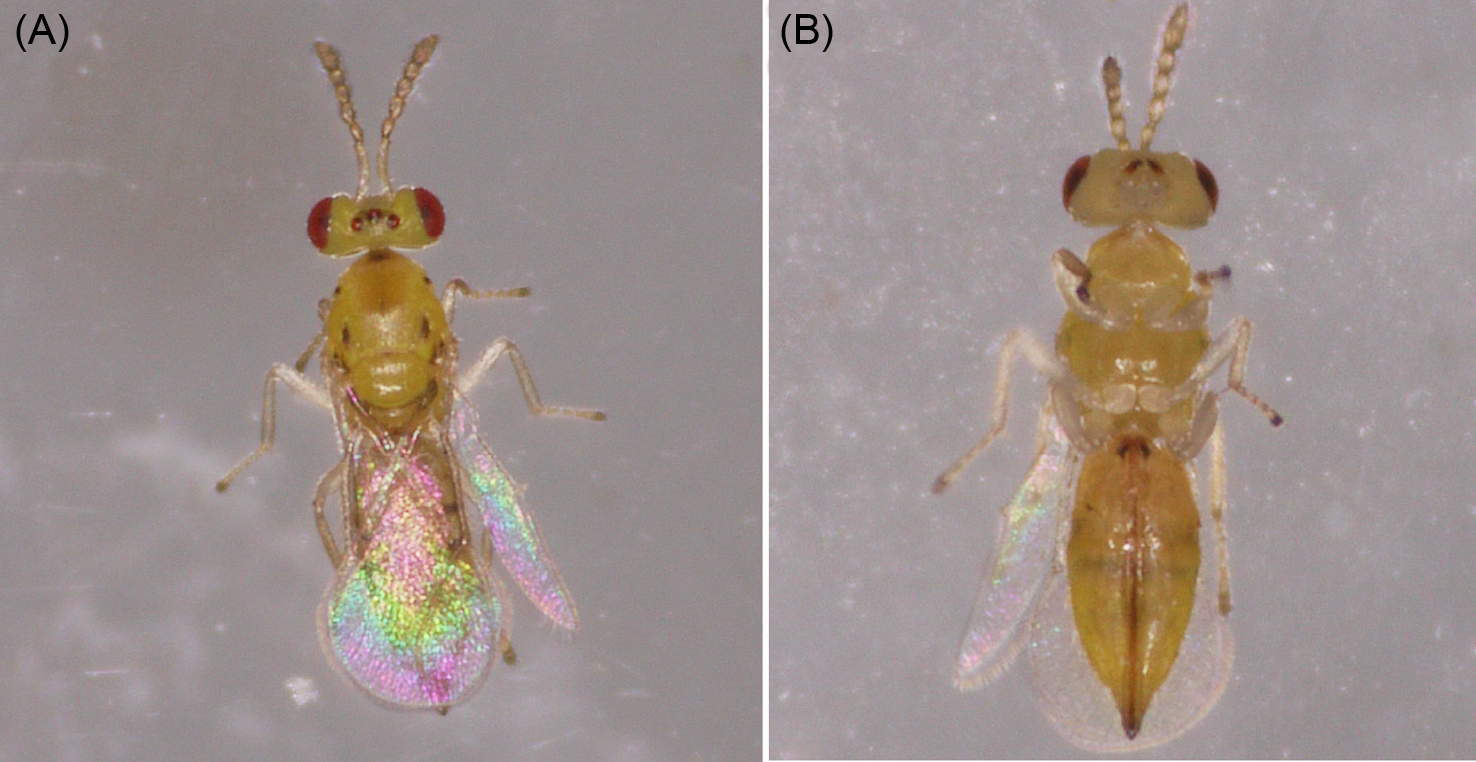
- Quadrastichus mendeli

Scientific classification
- Kingdom: Animalia
- Phylum: Arthropoda
- Clade: Pancrustacea
- Class: Insecta
- Order: Hymenoptera
- Family: Eulophidae
- Subfamily: Tetrastichinae
- Genus: Quadrastichus; Girault, 1913

Type species
- Quadrastichus nigrinotatus Girault, 1913

Species
- 89 species

Synonyms
- Cecidotetrastichus Kostjukov, 1977; Tetrastichus (Cecidotetrastichus) Kostjukov, 1977

= Quadrastichus =

Genus of wasps

Quadrastichus is a genus of hymenopteran insects of the family Eulophidae.

Species include Quadrastichus erythrinae and Quadrastichus mendeli.
