= Dzhanokmenia =

Scientific classification
- Kingdom: Animalia
- Phylum: Arthropoda
- Clade: Pancrustacea
- Class: Insecta
- Order: Hymenoptera
- Family: Eulophidae
- Subfamily: Tetrastichinae
- Genus: Dzhanokmenia; Kostjukov, 1977

Type species
- Dzhanokmenia bibikovae (Dzhanokmen, 1971)

Species
- 15 Species

Genus of wasps

Dzhanokmenia is a genus of hymenopteran insects of the family Eulophidae. It is a parasitoid of Stefaniola flies. It is found in Russia and Eastern Asia.
