= Pasohstichus =

Scientific classification
- Domain: Eukaryota
- Kingdom: Animalia
- Phylum: Arthropoda
- Class: Insecta
- Order: Hymenoptera
- Family: Eulophidae
- Subfamily: Tetrastichinae
- Genus: Pasohstichus; Ikeda, 1997

Species
- Pasohstichus konishii Ikeda, 1997

Genus of wasps

Pasohstichus is a genus of hymenopteran insects of the family Eulophidae.
