= Agmostigma =

Scientific classification
- Domain: Eukaryota
- Kingdom: Animalia
- Phylum: Arthropoda
- Class: Insecta
- Order: Hymenoptera
- Family: Eulophidae
- Subfamily: Tetrastichinae
- Genus: Agmostigma; Ubaidillah and LaSalle, 1996

Type species
- Agmostigma frontalis Ubaidillah and LaSalle, 1996

Species
- Agmostigma bruneiense Ubaidillah and LaSalle, 1996; Agmostigma frontale Ubaidillah and LaSalle, 1996; Agmostigma ilhami Ubaidillah and LaSalle, 1996

Genus of wasps

Agmostigma is a small genus of hymenopteran insects of the family Eulophidae which contains three species, all described in 1996 by Ubaidillah and LaSalle and so far only recorded from Brunei in northern Borneo.
