= Peckelachertus =

Scientific classification
- Kingdom: Animalia
- Phylum: Arthropoda
- Clade: Pancrustacea
- Class: Insecta
- Order: Hymenoptera
- Family: Eulophidae
- Subfamily: Tetrastichinae
- Genus: Peckelachertus; Yoshimoto, 1970

Type species
- Peckelachertus anglicus Yoshimoto, 1970

Species
- Peckelachertus anglicus Graham, 1977; Peckelachertus diprioni Yoshimoto, 1970

Genus of wasps

Peckelachertus is a genus of hymenopteran insects of the family Eulophidae. Hosts of one species, P. diprioni, are known to be from the sawfly genus Gilpinia.
