= Goethella =

Scientific classification
- Domain: Eukaryota
- Kingdom: Animalia
- Phylum: Arthropoda
- Class: Insecta
- Order: Hymenoptera
- Family: Eulophidae
- Subfamily: Tetrastichinae
- Genus: Goethella; Girault, 1928

Species
- Goethella asulcata Girault, 1928

Genus of wasps

Goethella is a genus of hymenopteran insects of the family Eulophidae.
