= Benoitius =

Scientific classification
- Kingdom: Animalia
- Phylum: Arthropoda
- Class: Insecta
- Order: Hymenoptera
- Family: Eulophidae
- Subfamily: Tetrastichinae
- Genus: Benoitius; Risbec, 1958

Species
- Benoitius hirsutus Risbec, 1958

Genus of wasps

Benoitius is a genus of hymenopteran insects of the family Eulophidae.
