= Ceratoneuropsis =

Scientific classification
- Domain: Eukaryota
- Kingdom: Animalia
- Phylum: Arthropoda
- Class: Insecta
- Order: Hymenoptera
- Family: Eulophidae
- Subfamily: Tetrastichinae
- Genus: Ceratoneuropsis; Girault, 1913

Species
- Ceratoneuropsis poincarei Girault, 1913

Genus of wasps

Ceratoneuropsis is a genus of hymenopteran insects of the family Eulophidae.
