= Thripastichus =

Thripastichus gentilei

Scientific classification
- Domain: Eukaryota
- Kingdom: Animalia
- Phylum: Arthropoda
- Class: Insecta
- Order: Hymenoptera
- Family: Eulophidae
- Genus: Thripastichus; Graham, 1987
- Species: T. gentilei

Binomial name
- Thripastichus gentilei (Del Guercio, 1931)

Genus of wasps

Thripastichus is a genus of hymenopteran insects of the family Eulophidae.

It has a single species, Thripastichus gentilei, which is a parasitoid on thrips such as Rhipipothrips cruentatus and Gynaikothrips uzelii found on grapes.
