= Narendrania =

Scientific classification
- Domain: Eukaryota
- Kingdom: Animalia
- Phylum: Arthropoda
- Class: Insecta
- Order: Hymenoptera
- Family: Eulophidae
- Subfamily: Tetrastichinae
- Genus: Narendrania; Fousi, 2004

Species
- Narendrania keralensis Fousi, 2004

Genus of wasps

Narendrania is a genus of hymenopteran insects of the family Eulophidae.
