= Enneastichus =

Scientific classification
- Kingdom: Animalia
- Phylum: Arthropoda
- Class: Insecta
- Order: Hymenoptera
- Family: Eulophidae
- Subfamily: Tetrastichinae
- Genus: Enneastichus; Kieffer, 1910

Species
- Enneastichus pustularum Kieffer, 1910

Genus of wasps

Enneastichus is a genus of hymenopteran insects of the family Eulophidae.
