= Planotetrastichus =

Scientific classification
- Domain: Eukaryota
- Kingdom: Animalia
- Phylum: Arthropoda
- Class: Insecta
- Order: Hymenoptera
- Family: Eulophidae
- Subfamily: Tetrastichinae
- Genus: Planotetrastichus; Yang, 1996

Species
- Planotetrastichus scolyti Yang, 1996

Genus of wasps

Planotetrastichus is a genus of hymenopteran insects of the family Eulophidae.
