= Ceratoneuronella =

Scientific classification
- Domain: Eukaryota
- Kingdom: Animalia
- Phylum: Arthropoda
- Class: Insecta
- Order: Hymenoptera
- Family: Eulophidae
- Subfamily: Tetrastichinae
- Genus: Ceratoneuronella; Girault, 1913

Type species
- Ceratoneuronella nigriventris Girault, 1913

Species
- Ceratoneuronella aligherini Girault, 1915; Ceratoneuronella nigriventris Girault, 1913; Ceratoneuronella rufobasalis Girault, 1915

Genus of wasps

Ceratoneuronella is a genus of hymenopteran insects of the family Eulophidae.
