= Eriastichus =

Scientific classification
- Kingdom: Animalia
- Phylum: Arthropoda
- Class: Insecta
- Order: Hymenoptera
- Family: Eulophidae
- Subfamily: Tetrastichinae
- Genus: Eriastichus; LaSalle, 1994

Type species
- Eriastichus cigdemae LaSalle, 1994

Genus of wasps

Eriastichus is a genus of hymenopteran insects of the family Eulophidae.

== Species ==
- Eriastichus acribis Hansson, 2021
- Eriastichus aphritis Hansson, 2021
- Eriastichus cigdemae LaSalle, 1994
- Eriastichus cluridis Hansson, 2021
- Eriastichus coelotis Hansson, 2021
- Eriastichus colenis Hansson, 2021
- Eriastichus copalensis Hansson, 2021
- Eriastichus daptilis Hansson, 2021
- Eriastichus decoris Hansson, 2021
- Eriastichus denotatis Hansson, 2021
- Eriastichus derilis Hansson, 2021
- Eriastichus diadrys Hansson, 2021
- Eriastichus dotaensis Hansson, 2021
- Eriastichus drupis Hansson, 2021
- Eriastichus ebulis Hansson, 2021
- Eriastichus egrestis Hansson, 2021
- Eriastichus eleagnis Hansson, 2021
- Eriastichus ellipsis Hansson, 2021
- Eriastichus eminis Hansson, 2021
- Eriastichus facilis Hansson, 2021
- Eriastichus fenestris Hansson, 2021
- Eriastichus follis Hansson, 2021
- Eriastichus galeatis Hansson, 2021
- Eriastichus geratis Hansson, 2021
- Eriastichus glanis Hansson, 2021
- Eriastichus hilaris Hansson, 2021
- Eriastichus johnlasallei Hansson, 2021
- Eriastichus johnnoyesi Hansson, 2021
- Eriastichus maniatis Hansson, 2021
- Eriastichus masneri LaSalle, 1994
- Eriastichus nakos LaSalle, 1994
- Eriastichus nebulis Hansson, 2021
- Eriastichus neonis Hansson, 2021
- Eriastichus nexilis Hansson, 2021
- Eriastichus novalis Hansson, 2021
- Eriastichus nugalis Hansson, 2021
- Eriastichus oasis Hansson, 2021
- Eriastichus ononis Hansson, 2021
- Eriastichus orestis Hansson, 2021
- Eriastichus pallidops Hansson, 2021
- Eriastichus parabilis Hansson, 2021
- Eriastichus renodis Hansson, 2021
- Eriastichus rivalis Hansson, 2021
- Eriastichus sannionis Hansson, 2021
- Eriastichus scalaris Hansson, 2021
- Eriastichus sodalis Hansson, 2021
- Eriastichus taraxis Hansson, 2021
- Eriastichus tendrilis Hansson, 2021
- Eriastichus tonioazofeifai Hansson, 2021
- Eriastichus velaminisand Hansson, 2021
- Eriastichus vestis Hansson, 2021
