= Aceratoneura =

Scientific classification
- Domain: Eukaryota
- Kingdom: Animalia
- Phylum: Arthropoda
- Class: Insecta
- Order: Hymenoptera
- Family: Eulophidae
- Subfamily: Tetrastichinae
- Genus: Aceratoneura; Girault & Dodd, 1915

Species
- Aceratonura splendida Girault & Dodd, 1915

Genus of wasps

Aceratoneura is a monotypic genus of hymenopteran insects of the family Eulophidae.
