= Sigmophora =

Scientific classification
- Kingdom: Animalia
- Phylum: Arthropoda
- Class: Insecta
- Order: Hymenoptera
- Family: Eulophidae
- Subfamily: Tetrastichinae
- Genus: Sigmophora; Rondani, 1867

Type species
- Sigmophora brevicornis (Panzer, 1804)

Species
- Sigmophora aceris Ikeda, 1999; Sigmophora bilobata (Girault, 1929); Sigmophora brevicornis (Panzer, 1804); Sigmophora diversa Ikeda, 1999; Sigmophora flammus Yefremova and Yegorenkova, 2009; Sigmophora io (Girault, 1913); Sigmophora italica (Domenichini, 1967); Sigmophora keralensis Narendran, 2007; Sigmophora longiseta Matsuo, 2013; Sigmophora lutea Ikeda, 1999; Sigmophora mediosulcata (Girault, 1924); Sigmophora otys (Walker, 1839); Sigmophora papuana Ikeda, 1999; Sigmophora polyseta (Saraswat, 1975); Sigmophora prolixa Ikeda, 1999; Sigmophora spenceri (Girault, 1915); Sigmophora tricolor (Ashmead, 1904); Sigmophora tumidifrons Ikeda, 1999

Synonyms
- Eulophotetrastichus Girault, 1913; Euplectrotetrastichus Girault, 1915; Lopodytes Rondani, 1867; Lopodytiscus Ghesquière, 1946

Genus of wasps

Sigmophora is a genus of hymenopteran insects of the family Eulophidae.
