= Arthur Burton Gahan =

American entomologist (1880–1960)

Arthur Burton Gahan (9 December 1880 — 23 May 1960) was an American entomologist who was a specialist on parasitic Hymenoptera particularly the Chalcidoidea.

Gahan was born in Kansas and went to Kansas State College where he graduated in 1903. He then studied entomology at the Maryland Agricultural College and received an M.S. in 1906 and then worked there as an entomologist. In 1913 he moved to the US Department of Agriculture and worked at the US National Museum and became a specialist on the Chalcidoidea. He was also a coach for the University of Maryland basketball team.

== See also ==
- Category:Taxa named by Arthur Burton Gahan
