= Zdeněk Bouček =

Zdeněk Bouček (8 January 1924 – 17 July 2011) was a Czech entomologist specializing in the Chalcidoidea superfamily of the Hymenoptera. Alongside Marcus Graham and Richard Askew, he helped lay the foundations of the modern systematics of chalcid wasps.

== Early life ==
Bouček was born in the Czech city of Hradec Králové on 8 January 1924, then part of Czechoslovakia. He married Tatiana Rýdlová in 1949 and they had one daughter, Jitka.

== Entomology ==
His first works as an entomologist were published while he was at the Charles University in Prague and he later worked at an agricultural research center before obtaining his PhD from the Czechoslovak Academy of Sciences, his thesis being a "Revision of Chalcidoidea of Europe". In 1969 he was forced to flee Czechoslovakia as a result of the deterioration of the political situation following the Prague Spring and the subsequent Soviet invasion. He took his family to the United Kingdom where he worked for a short time at the Hope Department at Oxford University before taking up a post at the Commonwealth Institute of Entomology in the Natural History Museum, London, where he worked until his retirement in 1989.

His main subject of taxonomic research was the Chalcidoidea, especially of the families which included those species with larger body sizes Leucospidae, Chalcididae, Pteromalidae, Torymidae and Eulophidae. Among his publications was the 800+ page book "Australasian Chalcidoidea" published in 1988, which was so large it took one person over two months to compile its informationn into the Zoological Record. Bouček published over 150 papers and named over 1100 taxa of Hymenoptera including 47 families and 281 genera. He was installed as an Honorary Fellow of the Royal Entomological Society in 2004 and was awarded the International Society of Hymenopterists Distinguished Research Medal in 2005.

== Retirement and death ==
Following his retirement in 1989 and the Velvet Revolution, Bouček returned to the Czech Republic, buying a cottage near his birthplace of Hradec Králové. He continued to work and publish texts on Chalcidoidea after retirement. He died in Prague on 17 July 2011 following a long illness.
