= Marcus Graham (entomologist) =

English entomologist

Marcus William Robert deVere Graham (25 March 1915 – 27 March 1995) was an English entomologist who specialised in the Chalcidoidea superfamily of the Hymenoptera. He was associated with both Oxford University and Trinity College, Dublin.

== Early life ==
Graham was born on 25 March 1915 in Rainton, County Durham, the son of the Reverend Robert Graham who was originally from County Donegal and Ms Bertha Heaton of Windermere. He developed an interest in entomology as a boy. He enlisted in the British Army at the start of World War II and served in India from 1942 until the end of the war.

== Entomology ==
Graham began to publish entomological papers in 1941. He entered Trinity College to study for a degree in Natural Science at the end of 1945, graduating in 1950 with both a Bachelor of Arts and a Bachelor of Science degree, being awarded First Class Honours and a Gold Medal. While he was still a student he made the first recorded observation of the sawfly Harpiphorus lepidus in Ireland. This species remains rare in Ireland. Also while in Ireland he was mentored by Arthur Wilson Stelfox and studied the Braconidae, especially their taxonomy. He and Stelfox published several joint papers during this time which described several species new to science. However, Stelfox advised him to concentrate on the Chalcidoidea.

Soon after returning to England he was appointed curator of the University Museum, Hope Department at Oxford University. In 1953 he married Eleanor Mary Scheppens, nicknamed Nora, and their only child, a son called John, was born in 1957.

In 1955 he was awarded a D. Phil. degree by the University of Oxford, where as well as curating he was an administrator, teacher and researcher. He was a major contributor to the knowledge of the European Chalcid fauna, especially the Pteromalidae, Mymaridae and the Eulophidae. Nora was also interested in entomology and often joined Marcus on collecting expeditions and she collected the type specimen of the striking Braconid Chorebus norae on one such trip to Madeira, which Graham named in her honour. He retained his links with Dublin where he worked on Trinity College's Haliday Collection, carefully curating the collection to restore its scientific utility. The research he conducted during his visits to Trinity College enabled him to make many important discoveries and as a result of the field work he conducted in Ireland, he was able to add many species of chalcid wasp to the list of those found in Ireland, some being new to science. Among the pteromalids he found in Ireland many have yet to be found in Britain. He retired from the Hope in 1981, and made his last visit to Dublin in 1984. During his career he described 60 new genera and 475 species of Hymenoptera.

== Other interests ==
Outside of entomology Graham had a number of interests including languages, especially Romance languages, mediaeval literature, history, naval architecture and painting. However, he continued to work on entomology after retirement and was preparing a paper on the revision of the genus Torymus when he died, he refereed a paper for the Bulletin of the Irish Biogeographical Society just before he died and gave the authors invaluable advice, despite his failing health and hospitalisation. He died on 27 March 1995 and was survived by his wife, Nora, and son, John.
