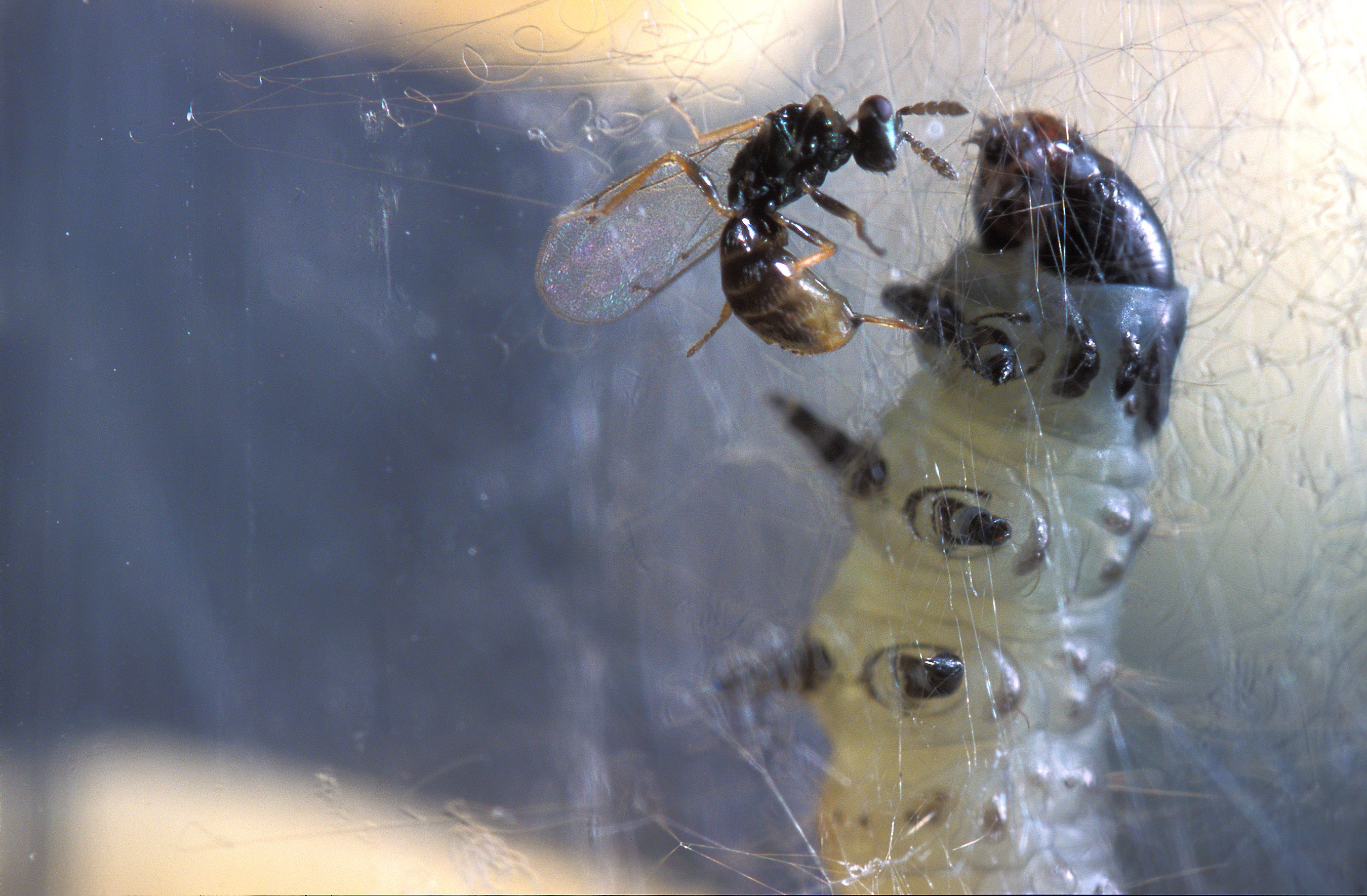
- Colpoclypeus florus (female)

Scientific classification
- Kingdom: Animalia
- Phylum: Arthropoda
- Clade: Pancrustacea
- Class: Insecta
- Order: Hymenoptera
- Family: Eulophidae
- Subfamily: Eulophinae; Westwood, 1829

Genera
- See text

Synonyms
- List: Cirrospilinae LaSalle, 2000; Cirrospilini LaSalle, 2000; Cyclopleurinae Cameron, 1913; Elachertidae Förster, 1856; Elachertinae Förster, 1856; Elachertini Förster, 1856; Elachistina Förster, 1856; Elachistinae Förster, 1856; Elachistoidae Förster, 1856; Elasmidae Förster, 1856; Elasminae Förster, 1856; Elasmini Förster, 1856; Elasmoidae Förster, 1856; Eulophini Westwood, 1829; Euplectrinae Ashmead, 1904; Euplectrini Ashmead, 1904; Hemiptarseninae Ashmead, 1904; Hemiptarsenini Ashmead, 1904

= Eulophinae =

Subfamily of wasps

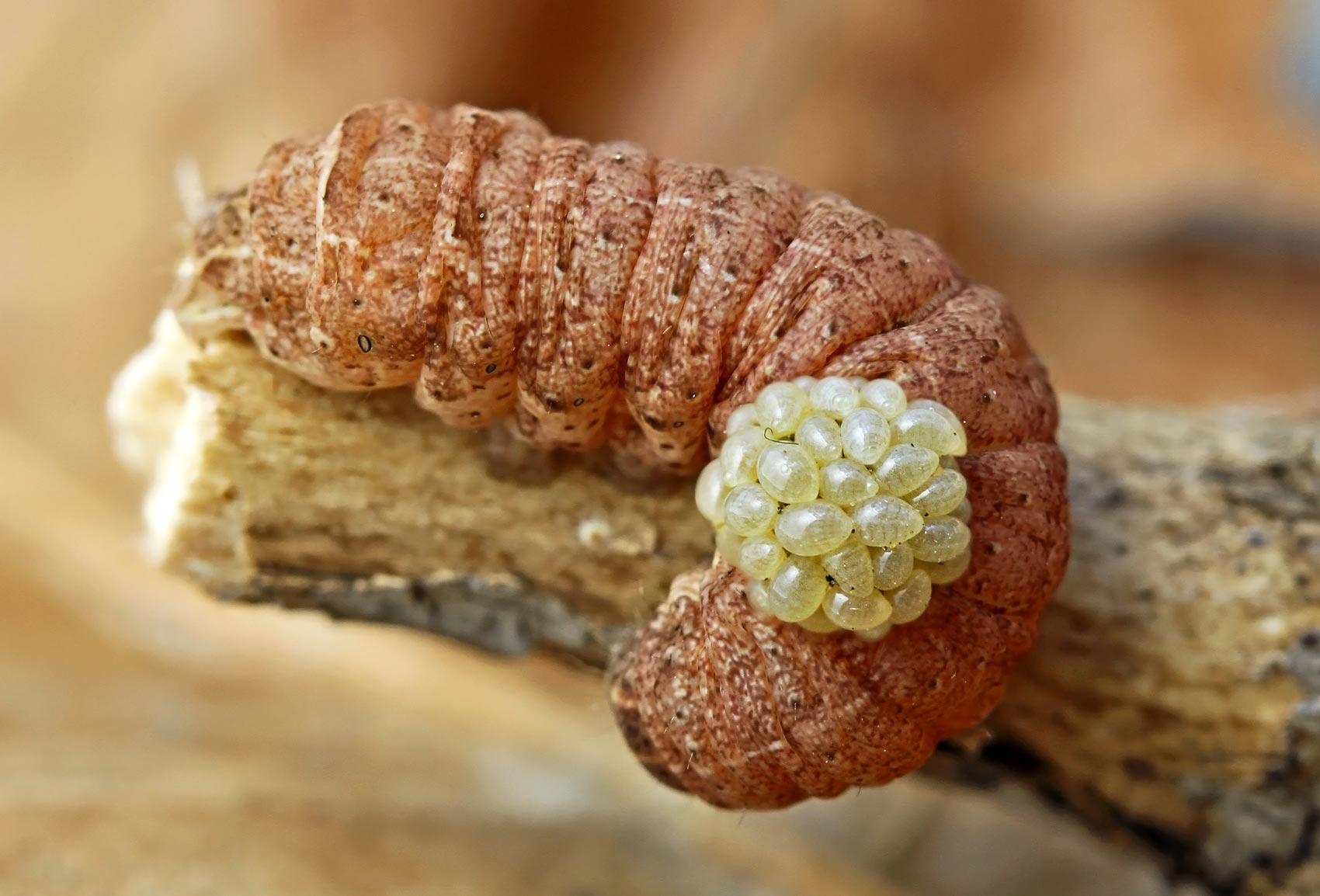
Euplectrus sp. larvae on Noctuidae caterpillar

Eulophinae is a subfamily of wasps in the family Eulophidae which includes over 90 genera.

== Genera ==
The genera included in Eulophinae are:

- Alibertia Risbec, 1951
- Alophomorphella Girault, 1913
- Alophomyia Ashmead, 1904
- Alveoplectrus Wijesekara and Schauff, 1997
- Anumanniola Narendran, 2003
- Arachnolophus Kamijo, 1996
- Aroplectrus Lin, 1963
- Ascotolinx Girault, 1913
- Aulogymnus Förster, 1851
- Austeulophus Boucek, 1988
- Boucekiola Narendran, 2005
- Cirrospiloidelleus Girault, 1913
- Cirrospilus Westwood, 1832
- Clotildiella Erdös, 1964
- Cobarus Boucek, 1988
- Colpoclypeus Lucchese, 1941
- Cristelacher Schauff and LaSalle, 1993
- Dahlbominus Hincks, 1945
- Dasyeulophus Schauff and LaSalle, 1993
- Dermatopelte Erdös and Novicky, 1951
- Deutereulophus Schulz, 1904
- Diaulinopsis Crawford, 1912
- Diaulomorpha Ashmead, 1900
- Dichatomus Förster, 1878
- Dicladocerus Westwood, 1832
- Diglyphomorpha Ashmead, 1904
- Diglyphomorphomyia Girault, 1913
- Diglyphus Walker, 1844
- Dimmockia Ashmead, 1904
- Dineulophus De Santis, 1985
- Elachertomorpha Ashmead, 1904
- Elachertus Spinola, 1811
- Elasmus Westwood, 1833
- Eulophinusia Girault, 1913
- Eulophomorpha Dodd, 1915
- Eulophomyia De Santis, 1957
- Eulophus Geoffroy, 1762
- Euplectromorpha Girault, 1913
- Euplectrophelinus Girault, 1913
- Euplectrus Westwood, 1832
- Eupronotius Boucek, 1988
- Eurycephaloplectrus Wijesekara and Schauff, 1997
- Gallowayia Boucek, 1988
- Gattonia Boucek, 1988
- Ginsiella Erdös, 1951
- Grotiusomyia Girault, 1917
- Hamonia Risbec, 1957
- Hayatiola Narendran, 2006
- Hemiptarsenus Westwood, 1833
- Hoplocrepis Ashmead, 1890
- Hyssopus Girault, 1916
- Melittobiopsis Timberlake, 1926
- Meruacesa Koçak and Kemal, 2009
- Metaplectrus Ferrière, 1941
- Microlycus Thomson, 1878
- Miotropis Thomson, 1878
- Mohaniella Khan, 1995
- Naumanniola Boucek, 1988
- Necremnoides Girault, 1913
- Necremnus Thomson, 1878
- Nesympiesis Boucek, 1988
- Notanisomorphella Girault, 1913
- Noyesius Boucek, 1988
- Ogmoelachertus Schauff, 2000
- Oxycantha Surekha and Ubaidillah, 1996
- Paraolinx Ashmead, 1894
- Pauahiana Yoshimoto, 1965
- Perinetia Risbec, 1952
- Petiolacus Boucek, 1988
- Platyplectrus Ferrière, 1941
- Pnigalio Schrank, 1802
- Propodeochertus Narendran, 2011
- Pseudiglyphus Girault, 1915
- Pseudiglyphus Girault, 1915
- Ramiplectrus Yefremova and Feldstein-Farkash, 2025
- Renaniana Girault, 1931
- Rhicnopelte Förster, 1878
- Ryhonos Boucek, 1988
- Semielacher Boucek, 1988
- Setelacher Boucek, 1988
- Seyrigina Risbec, 1952
- Skoka Boucek, 1988
- Stenomesius Westwood, 1833
- Stenopetius Boucek, 1988
- Sureshanella Narendran, 2011
- Sympiesis Förster, 1856
- Sympiesomorpha Ashmead, 1904
- Tooloomius Boucek, 1988
- Trichospilus Ferrière, 1930
- Trielacher Boucek, 1988
- Tylomischus De Santis, 1972
- Xanthella Moczár, 1950
- Zagrammosoma Ashmead, 1904
- Zasympiesis Boucek, 1988
- Zealachertus Boucek, 1978
