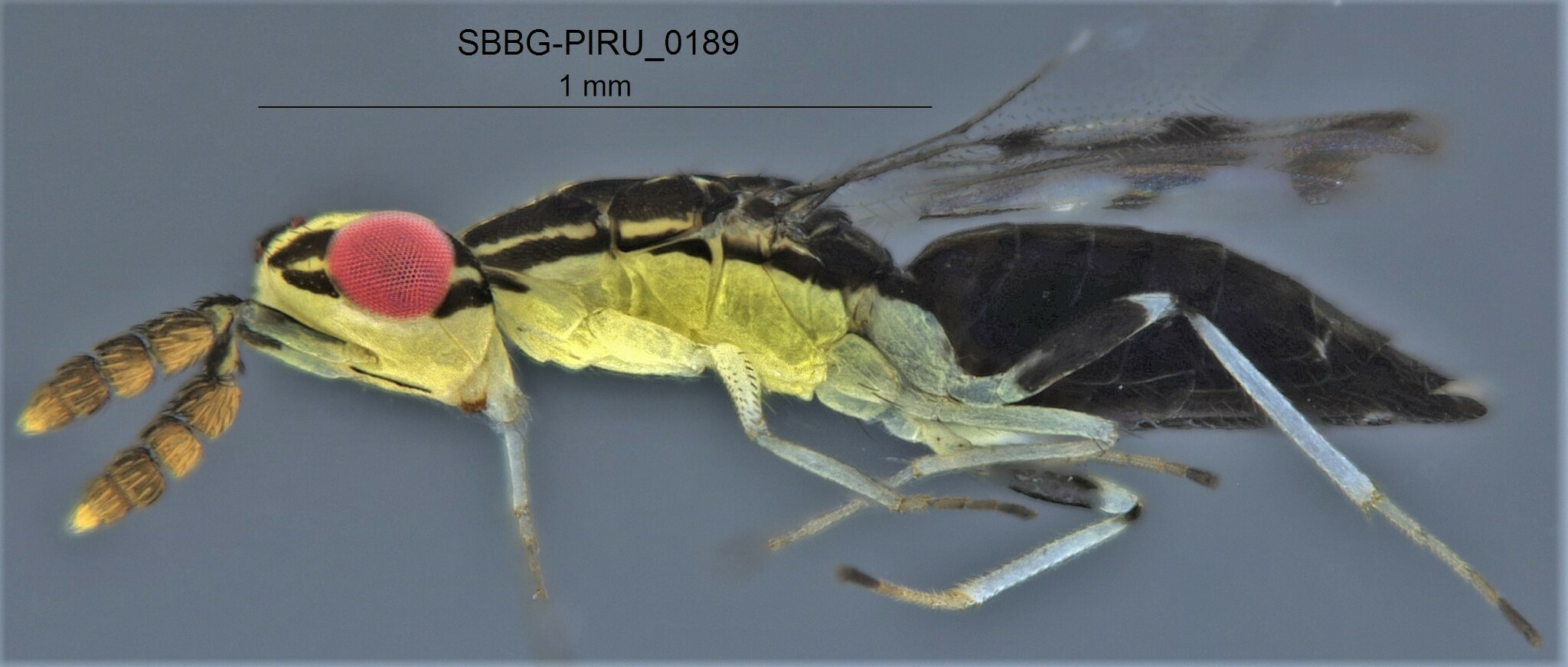

Scientific classification
- Kingdom: Animalia
- Phylum: Arthropoda
- Class: Insecta
- Order: Hymenoptera
- Family: Eulophidae
- Subfamily: Eulophinae
- Genus: Zagrammosoma; Ashmead 1904

Synonyms
- Cirrospilus (Zagrammosoma) Ashmead, 1904; Hippocephalus Ashmead, 1888; Mirzagrammosoma Girault, 1915; Zagrammatosoma Schulz, 1906

= Zagrammosoma =

Genus of wasps

Zagrammosoma is a genus of hymenopteran insects in the family Eulophidae. They parasitize leafmining larvae of the insect orders Lepidoptera and Diptera.

== Species ==
- Zagrammosoma americanum Girault, 1916
- Zagrammosoma buselus (Walker, 1839)
- Zagrammosoma calvini Perry, 2021 (in Perry & Heraty, 2021)
- Zagrammosoma centrolineatum Crawford, 1913
- Zagrammosoma crowei (Kerrich, 1969) [conta as shown on GBIF]
- Zagrammosoma deliae Perry, 2021 (in Perry & Heraty, 2021)
- Zagrammosoma fisheri Perry, 2021 (in Perry & Heraty, 2021)
- Zagrammosoma flavolineatum Crawford, 1913
- Zagrammosoma galapagoense Perry, 2021 (in Perry & Heraty, 2021)
- Zagrammosoma headricki Perry, 2021 (in Perry & Heraty, 2021)
- Zagrammosoma hobbesi LaSalle, 1989
- Zagrammosoma interlineatum Girault, 1916 (Stat. rest. in Perry & Heraty, 2021)
- Zagrammosoma intermedium Gordh, 1978
- Zagrammosoma lasallei Yefremova & Kishinevsky, 2021
- Zagrammosoma latilineatum Ubaidillah, 2000
- Zagrammosoma lineaticeps (Girault, 1915)
- Zagrammosoma melinum Gordh, 1978
- Zagrammosoma metallicum Perry, 2021 (in Perry & Heraty, 2021)
- Zagrammosoma multilineatum (Ashmead, 1888)
- Zagrammosoma occidentale Perry, 2021 (in Perry & Heraty, 2021)
- Zagrammosoma ramotense Yefremova & Kishinevsky, 2021
- Zagrammosoma seini Wolcott, 1936
- Zagrammosoma talitzkii (Boucek, 1961)
- Zagrammosoma triangulum Perry, 2021 (in Perry & Heraty, 2021)
- Zagrammosoma trifurcatum Perry, 2021 (in Perry & Heraty, 2021)
- Zagrammosoma velerii Efremova, 1995
- Zagrammosoma villosum] Perry, 2021 (in Perry & Heraty, 2021)
- Zagrammosoma yanegai] Perry, 2021 (in Perry & Heraty, 2021)
