= Macroplectra nararia =

Scientific classification
- Kingdom: Animalia
- Phylum: Arthropoda
- Class: Insecta
- Order: Lepidoptera
- Family: Limacodidae
- Genus: Macroplectra
- Species: M. nararia

Binomial name
- Macroplectra nararia Moore, 1859

Species of moth

Macroplectra nararia, the coconut slug caterpillar, is a moth of the family Limacodidae. The species was first described by Frederic Moore in 1859. It is found in Sri Lanka and India.

It is a serious pest on coconut. The caterpillar feeds on leaf lamina until only the midribs remain. This results development of necrotic spots in early stage. In severe conditions, gumming on the nuts can be observed. Outbreaks were observed in Andhra Pradesh, India, in 2007, 2012 and 2013.

Two larval parasitoids, Euplectrus and Euplectromorpha are effective for control agents. Eurytoma monemae is a pupal parasitoid. Paecilomyces lilacinus is an effective entomopathogen of the moth. The patasitoid Pediobius imbrues has been successfully used to control the coconut slug caterpillar in India.
