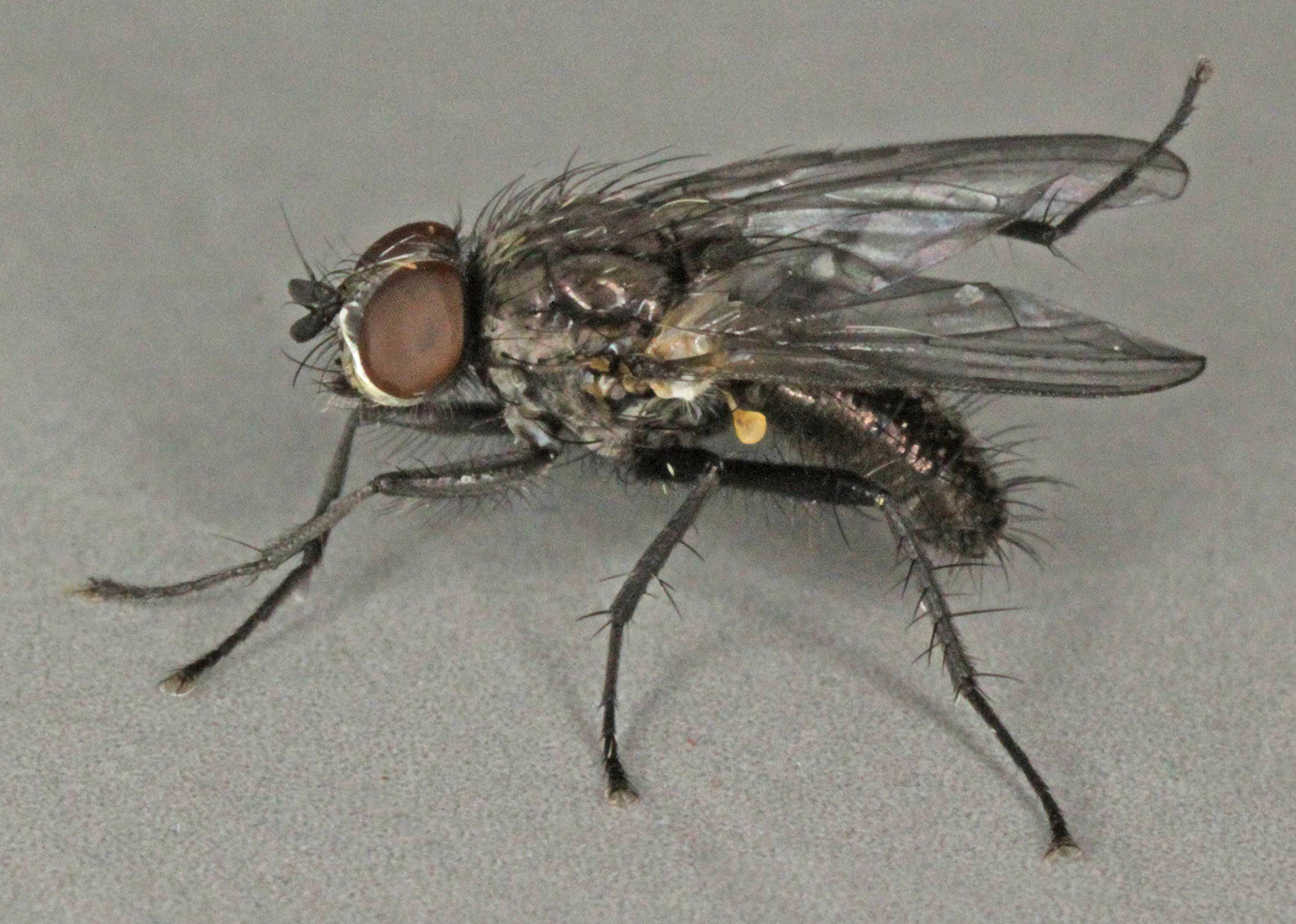
- Chirosia betuleti female
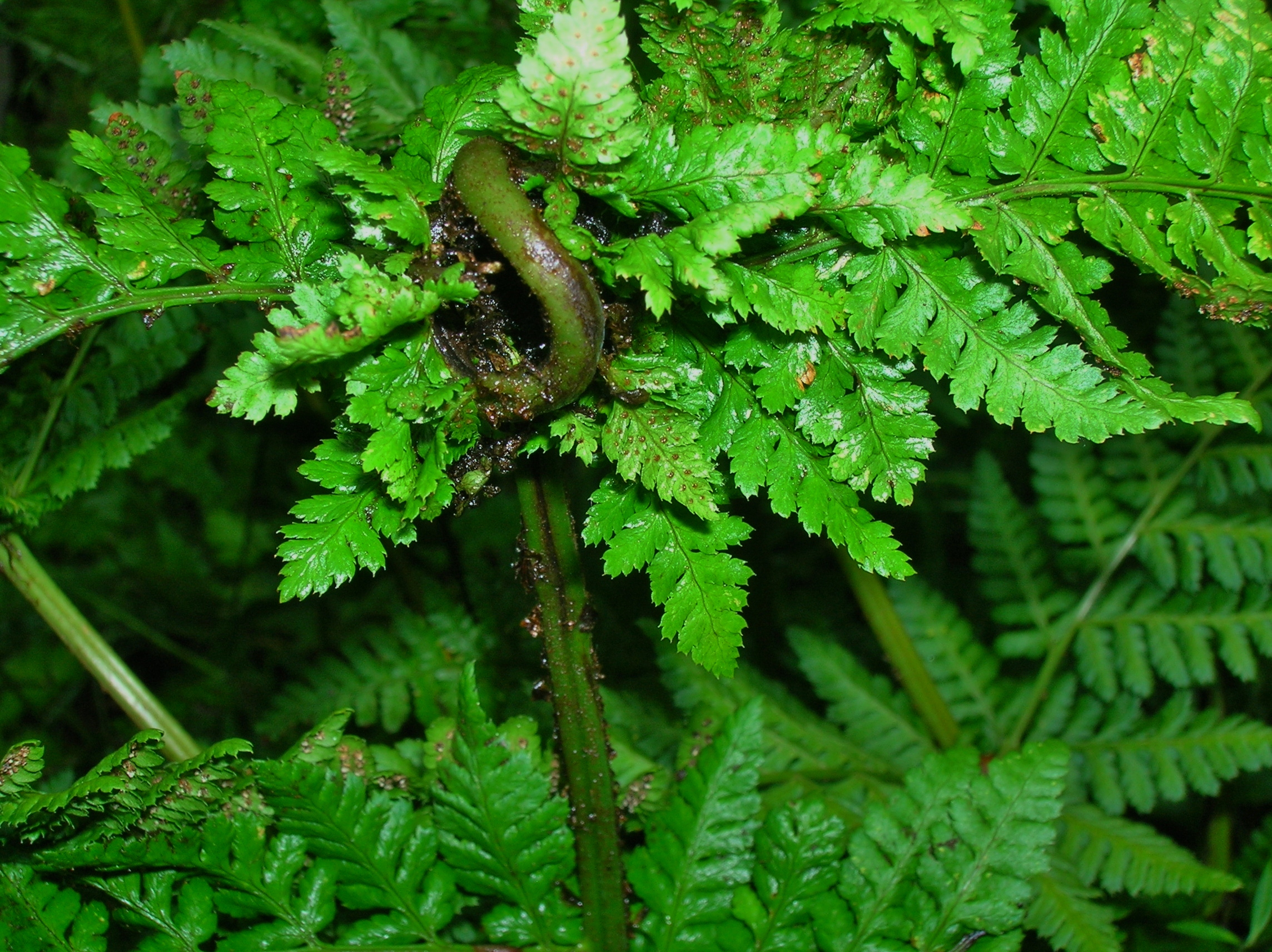
- Knotting gall on broad buckler fern

Scientific classification
- Kingdom: Animalia
- Phylum: Arthropoda
- Class: Insecta
- Order: Diptera
- Family: Anthomyiidae
- Genus: Chirosia
- Species: C. betuleti

Binomial name
- Chirosia betuleti (Ringdahl, 1935)

Synonyms
- Hylemyia betuleti Ringdahl, 1935; Chirosia signata (Brischke, 1888); Melinia carinata (Tiensuu, 1939)

= Chirosia betuleti =

Species of fly

Chirosia betuleti is a species of fly, which causes knotting gall in ferns. The gall develops in the terminal shoots of ferns, such as broad buckler fern (Dryopteris dilatata), male fern (Dryopteris filix-mas), lady fern (Athyrium filix-femina), and ostrich fern (Matteuccia struthiopteris).

== The physical appearance of the galls ==
The fly larva mines the leaves and stems of the fern's frond at the apex. The tip of the frond rolls upwards into a loose, obvious knot or mop-head structure involving many pinnae; inside, a white larva mines along the rachis, eating the trichomes, causing it to coil. Usually, only one larva is present in the leaf tip, sometimes two. An elongated white egg shell is visible at the centre of the mass.

== Lifecycle ==
Eggs are laid in the unfurling fronds and the hatched larvae feed on the trichomes in the groove of the rachis, causing the frond to curl inwards. The pupae drop from the gall and remain from autumn and winter to emerge in the spring. Galling rates up to nine fronds in 13 on a single plant have been noted.

== Distribution ==
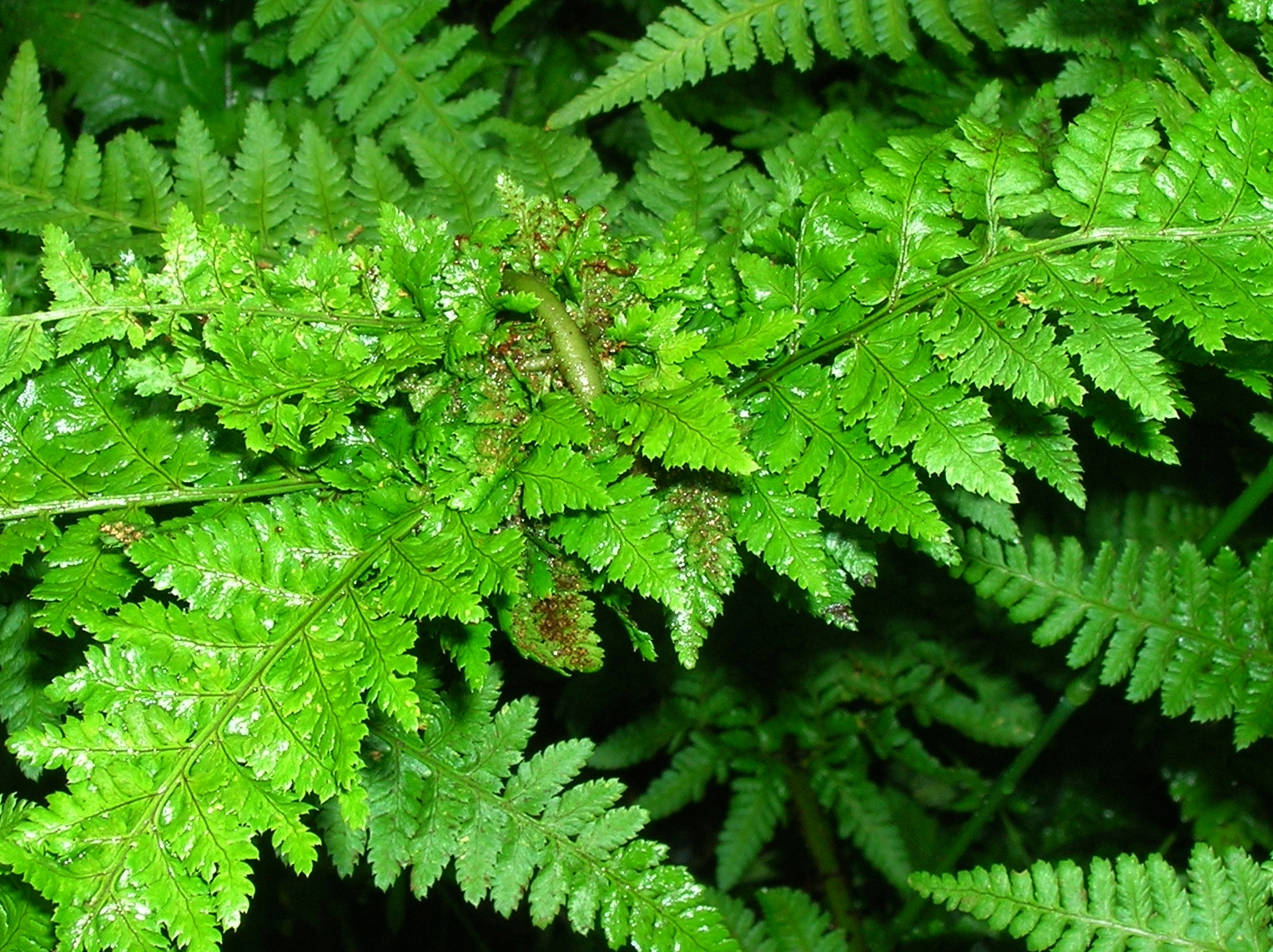
Broad buckler fern with a knotting gall

The knotting gall is found in Cornwall, Wiltshire, Worcester, Hants, Norfolk, Warwickshire, Berkshire, Cardiganshire, Cheshire, Denbighshire, East Norfolk, Suffolk, Easterness, Elgin, Flintshire, North Ayrshire, Herefordshire, Merionethshire, Perth, Yorkshire, Montgomeryshire, Lincolnshire, Somerset, Oxfordshire, Shropshire, Devon, Hampshire, Yorkshire, Stafford, Surrey, Gloucestershire, Kent, Suffolk, and Worcestershire.

As shown, the knotting gall has been recorded throughout the United Kingdom, in the Netherlands, the Czech Republic, Denmark, Finland, France, Germany, Italy, Norway, Poland, Russia – north and north-west, Slovakia, Spain, and Sweden.

== Parasitoids ==
Braconid wasps of the genus Aphaereta and eulophid wasps of the genera Dimmockia and Elachertus have been identified as parasitoids of C. betuleti.
