= Perinetia (wasp) =

Scientific classification
- Kingdom: Animalia
- Phylum: Arthropoda
- Clade: Pancrustacea
- Class: Insecta
- Order: Hymenoptera
- Family: Eulophidae
- Subfamily: Eulophinae
- Genus: Perinetia; Risbec, 1952

Species
- Perinetia coffea Risbec, 1952

Genus of wasps

Perinetia is a genus of hymenopteran insects of the family Eulophidae.
