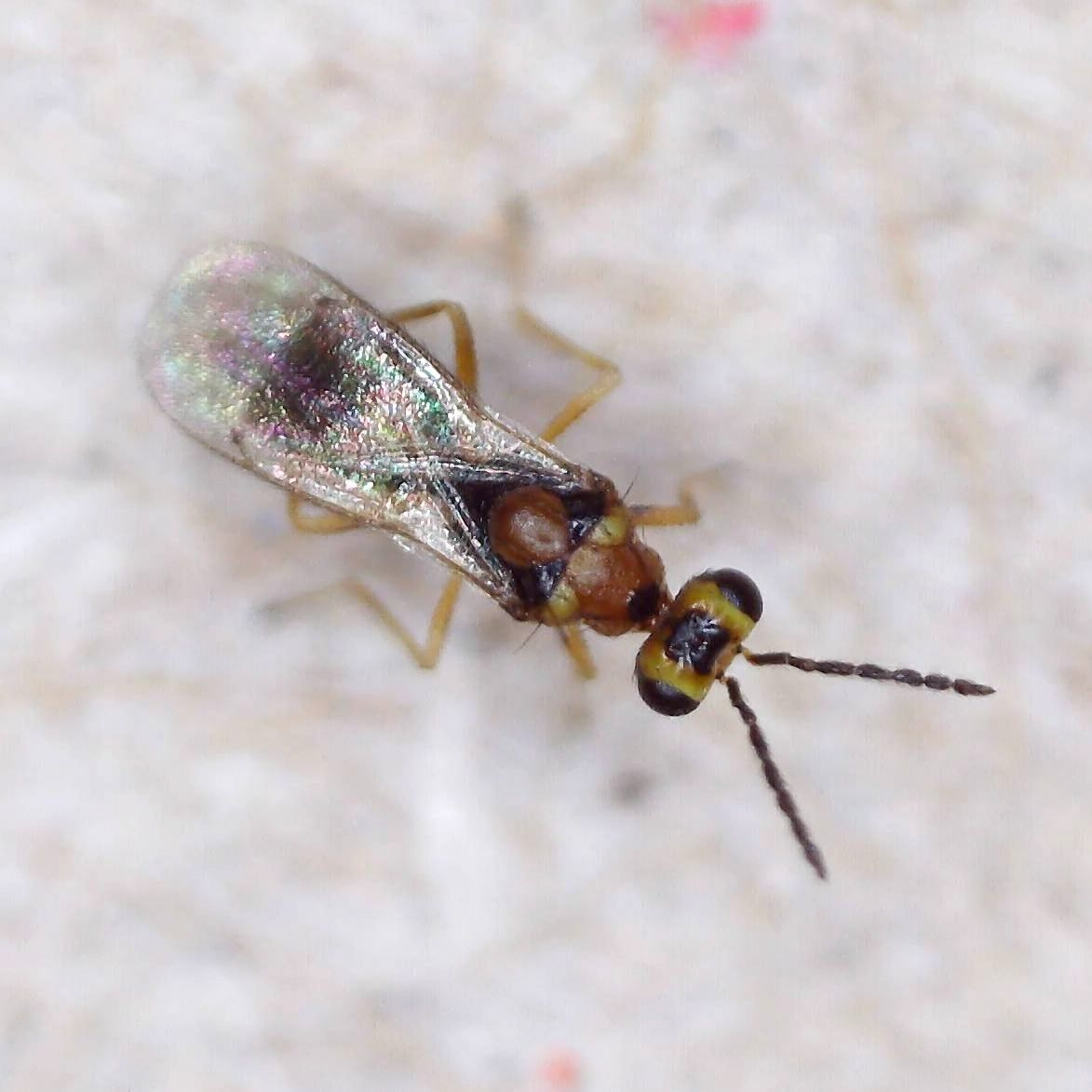
- Stenomesius rufescens

Scientific classification
- Kingdom: Animalia
- Phylum: Arthropoda
- Class: Insecta
- Order: Hymenoptera
- Family: Eulophidae
- Subfamily: Eulophinae
- Genus: Stenomesius; Westwood, 1833

Species
- See text

Synonyms
- Euryscotolinx Girault, 1913; Nioro Risbec, 1951; Stenelachistus Masi, 1917

= Stenomesius =

Genus of wasps

Stenomesius is a genus of wasps in the family Eulophidae.

== Species ==
The following species are recognised in the genus Stenomesius:

- Stenomesius albipes (Ashmead, 1894)
- Stenomesius aligarhicus Narendran, 2011
- Stenomesius anati Khan and Jaikishan Singh, 1994
- Stenomesius aphidicola Ashmead, 1880
- Stenomesius belouvi (Risbec, 1957)
- Stenomesius bitinctus Ferrière, 1960
- Stenomesius calicuticus Narendran, 2011
- Stenomesius ceramidiae Boucek, 1962
- Stenomesius dimidiatus Ashmead, 1904
- Stenomesius elegantulus (Risbec, 1951)
- Stenomesius guanshanensis Fan & Li, 2021
- Stenomesius guttativertex (Girault, 1913)
- Stenomesius hani Fan & Li, 2021
- Stenomesius harbinensis Fan & Li, 2021
- Stenomesius immarginatus (Girault, 1915)
- Stenomesius japonicus (Ashmead, 1904)
- Stenomesius maculatus Liao, 1987
- Stenomesius masii (Risbec, 1957)
- Stenomesius modicellus Khan, 1994
- Stenomesius orientalis Agnihotri and Khan, 2004
- Stenomesius rufescens (Retzius, 1783)
- Stenomesius singularis (Shafee and Rizvi, 1988)
