= Hamonia =

Scientific classification
- Kingdom: Animalia
- Phylum: Arthropoda
- Class: Insecta
- Order: Hymenoptera
- Family: Eulophidae
- Subfamily: Eulophinae
- Genus: Hamonia; Risbec 1957

Type species
- Hamonia sexdentata Risbec, 1957

Species
- Hamonia reunionensis Risbec, 1957; Hamonia sexdentata Risbec, 1957; Hamonia sylvatica Risbec, 1957

Genus of wasps

Hamonia is a genus of hymenopteran insects of the family Eulophidae.
