= Seyrigina =

Scientific classification
- Kingdom: Animalia
- Phylum: Arthropoda
- Class: Insecta
- Order: Hymenoptera
- Family: Eulophidae
- Subfamily: Eulophinae
- Genus: Seyrigina; Risbec, 1952

Type species
- Seyrigina gracile Risbec, 1952

Species
- Seyrigina gracile Risbec, 1952; Seyrigina rizicola Risbec, 1960

Genus of wasps

Seyrigina is a genus of hymenopteran insects of the family Eulophidae.
