= Alibertia =

Alibertia is the name of two genera of life form:

- Alibertia (wasp), a genus of wasps in the family Eulophidae
- Alibertia (plant), a genus of flowering plants in the family Rubiaceae, found in tropical America
