= Diaulinopsis =

Scientific classification
- Domain: Eukaryota
- Kingdom: Animalia
- Phylum: Arthropoda
- Class: Insecta
- Order: Hymenoptera
- Family: Eulophidae
- Subfamily: Eulophinae
- Genus: Diaulinopsis; Crawford, 1912

Type species
- Diaulinopsis callichroma Crawford, 1912

Species
- Diaulinopsis albimaxilla Hansson, 2016; Diaulinopsis albiscapus (Girault, 1916); Diaulinopsis arenaria (Erdös, 1951); Diaulinopsis callichroma Crawford, 1912; Diaulinopsis subatricorpus Girault, 1915

Genus of wasps

Diaulinopsis is a genus of hymenopteran insects of the family Eulophidae.
