= Hyssopus =

Hyssopus may refer to:

- Hyssopus (wasp), a genus of wasps in the family Eulophidae
- Hyssopus (plant), a genus of aromatic plants in the family Lamiaceae known as hyssop
