= Deutereulophus =

Scientific classification
- Kingdom: Animalia
- Phylum: Arthropoda
- Clade: Pancrustacea
- Class: Insecta
- Order: Hymenoptera
- Family: Eulophidae
- Subfamily: Eulophinae
- Genus: Deutereulophus; Schulz, 1906

Type species
- Deutereulophus chapadae (Ashmead, 1904)

Species
- Deutereulophus albiclava (Girault, 1915); Deutereulophus arizonensis Schauff, 2000; Deutereulophus brevipennis (Erdös, 1951); Deutereulophus chapadae (Ashmead, 1904); Deutereulophus cyaneus (Ashmead, 1904); Deutereulophus floridensis Schauff, 2000; Deutereulophus froudei (Girault, 1938); Deutereulophus guamensis (Yoshimoto and Ishii, 1965); Deutereulophus interruptus Zhu and Huang, 2002; Deutereulophus malabarensis Narendran, 2007; Deutereulophus marginatus Zhu and Huang, 2002; Deutereulophus occularis Schauff, 2000; Deutereulophus pecki Schauff, 2000; Deutereulophus renani (Girault, 1913); Deutereulophus robustus (Girault, 1922); Deutereulophus smithi Schauff, 2000; Deutereulophus spadicicornis (Girault, 1915); Deutereulophus subfusciventris (Girault, 1915); Deutereulophus tennysoni (Girault, 1913); Deutereulophus timorensis Ubaidillah, 2003; Deutereulophus tunctatus Narendran, 2007; Deutereulophus unicus (Girault, 1915); Deutereulophus varicornis (Girault, 1915)

Synonyms
- Entedonomorpha Girault, 1913; Eulophopteryx Ashmead, 1904

Genus of wasps

Deutereulophus is a genus of hymenopteran insects of the family Eulophidae.
