= Dimmockia =

Scientific classification
- Domain: Eukaryota
- Kingdom: Animalia
- Phylum: Arthropoda
- Class: Insecta
- Order: Hymenoptera
- Family: Eulophidae
- Subfamily: Eulophinae
- Genus: Dimmockia; Ashmead, 1904

Type species
- Dimmockia incongrua Ashmead, 1904

Species
- Dimmockia brevicornis (Erdös, 1954); Dimmockia exorientis Storozheva, 1979; Dimmockia incongrua (Ashmead, 1898); Dimmockia marylandica Girault, 1920; Dimmockia pallipes Muesebeck, 1927; Dimmockia secunda Crawford, 1910

Synonyms
- Encopa Graham, 1959; Sympiesis (Encopa) Graham, 1959

Genus of wasps

Dimmockia is a genus of hymenopteran insects of the family Eulophidae.
