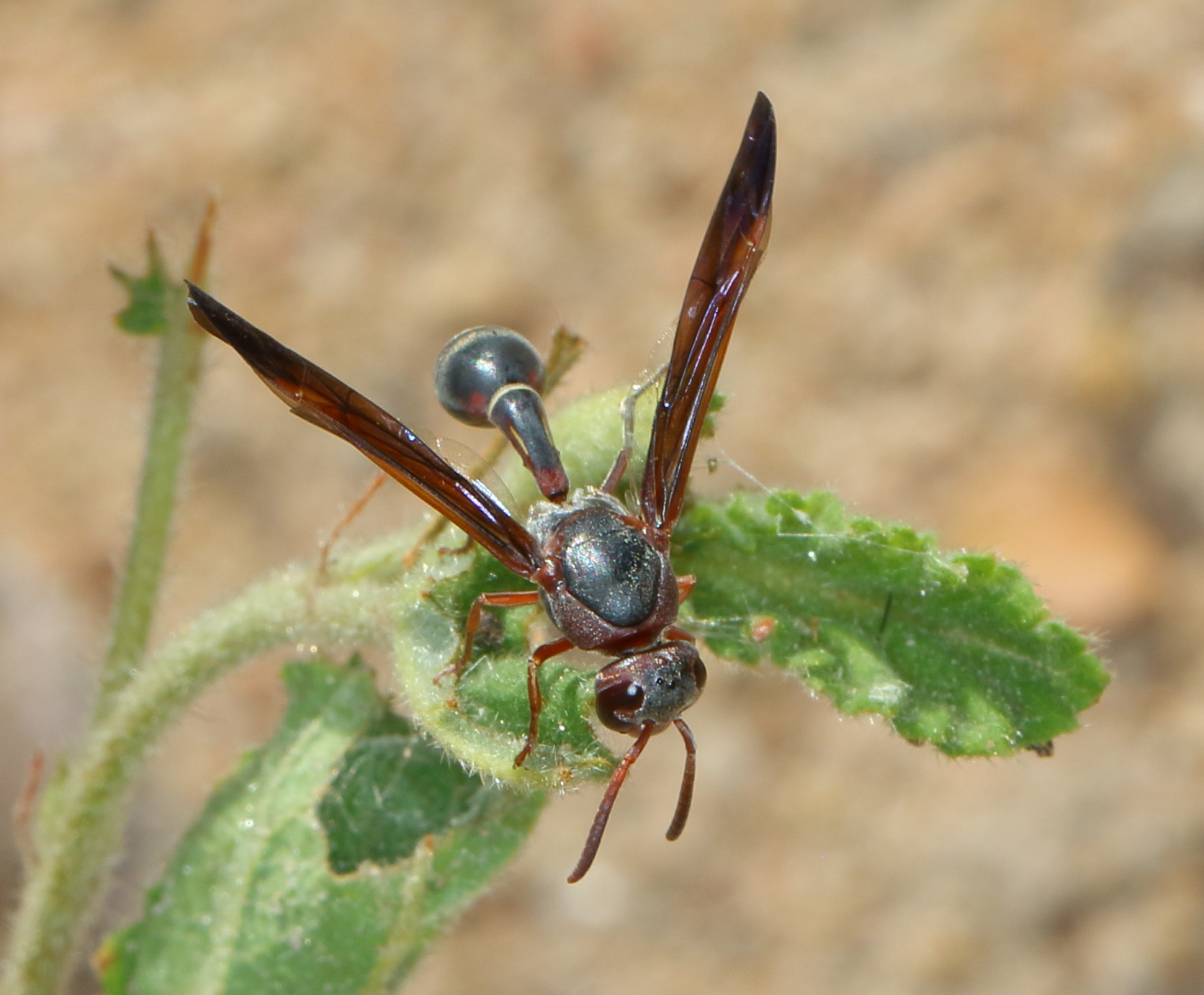
- Pareumenes sansibaricus

Scientific classification
- Domain: Eukaryota
- Kingdom: Animalia
- Phylum: Arthropoda
- Class: Insecta
- Order: Hymenoptera
- Family: Vespidae
- Subfamily: Eumeninae
- Genus: Pareumenes; Saussure, 1855

Type species
- Pareumenes quadrispinosus (Saussure, 1855)

Species
- See text

= Pareumenes =

Genus of wasps

Pareumenes is an Afrotropical, Palearctic and Oriental genus of potter wasps.

== Species ==
The following species are classified in the genus Pareumenes:

- Pareumenes acutus Liu, 1941
- Pareumenes australensis Meade-Waldo, 1910
- Pareumenes brevirostratus (Saussure, 1856)
- Pareumenes caffra (Meade-Waldo, 1911)
- Pareumenes carinulata (Spinosa, 1815)
- Pareumenes chinensis Liu, 1941
- Pareumenes imperatrix (Smith, 1857)
- Pareumenes impunctatus Selis, 2016
- Pareumenes intermedius Vecht, 1937
- Pareumenes laevis (Schulthess, 1903)
- Pareumenes laminatus (Kriechbaumer, 1879)
- Pareumenes mochii Giordani Soika, 1938
- Pareumenes nigerrimus Vecht, 1963
- Pareumenes obtusus Liu, 1941
- Pareumenes pilifrons (Kohl, 1907)
- Pareumenes pullatus (Smith, 1863)
- Pareumenes punctatissimus Giordani Soika, 1987
- Pareumenes quadrispinosus (Saussure, 1855)
- Pareumenes sansibaricus (Schulz, 1905)
- Pareumenes steinbachi (Schulthess, 1904)
