= Risbecia versicolor =

Scientific classification
- Kingdom: Animalia
- Phylum: Mollusca
- Class: Gastropoda
- Order: Nudibranchia
- Family: Chromodorididae
- Genus: Risbecia
- Species: R. versicolor

Binomial name
- Risbecia versicolor (Risbec, 1828)

Species of gastropod

Risbecia versicolor is a species of sea slug or dorid nudibranch, a marine gastropod mollusk in the family Chromodorididae.
