= Clotildiella =

Scientific classification
- Domain: Eukaryota
- Kingdom: Animalia
- Phylum: Arthropoda
- Class: Insecta
- Order: Hymenoptera
- Family: Eulophidae
- Subfamily: Eulophinae
- Genus: Clotildiella; Erdös, 1964

Species
- Clotildiella numidica Erdös, 1964

Genus of wasps

Clotildiella is a genus of hymenopteran insects of the family Eulophidae.
