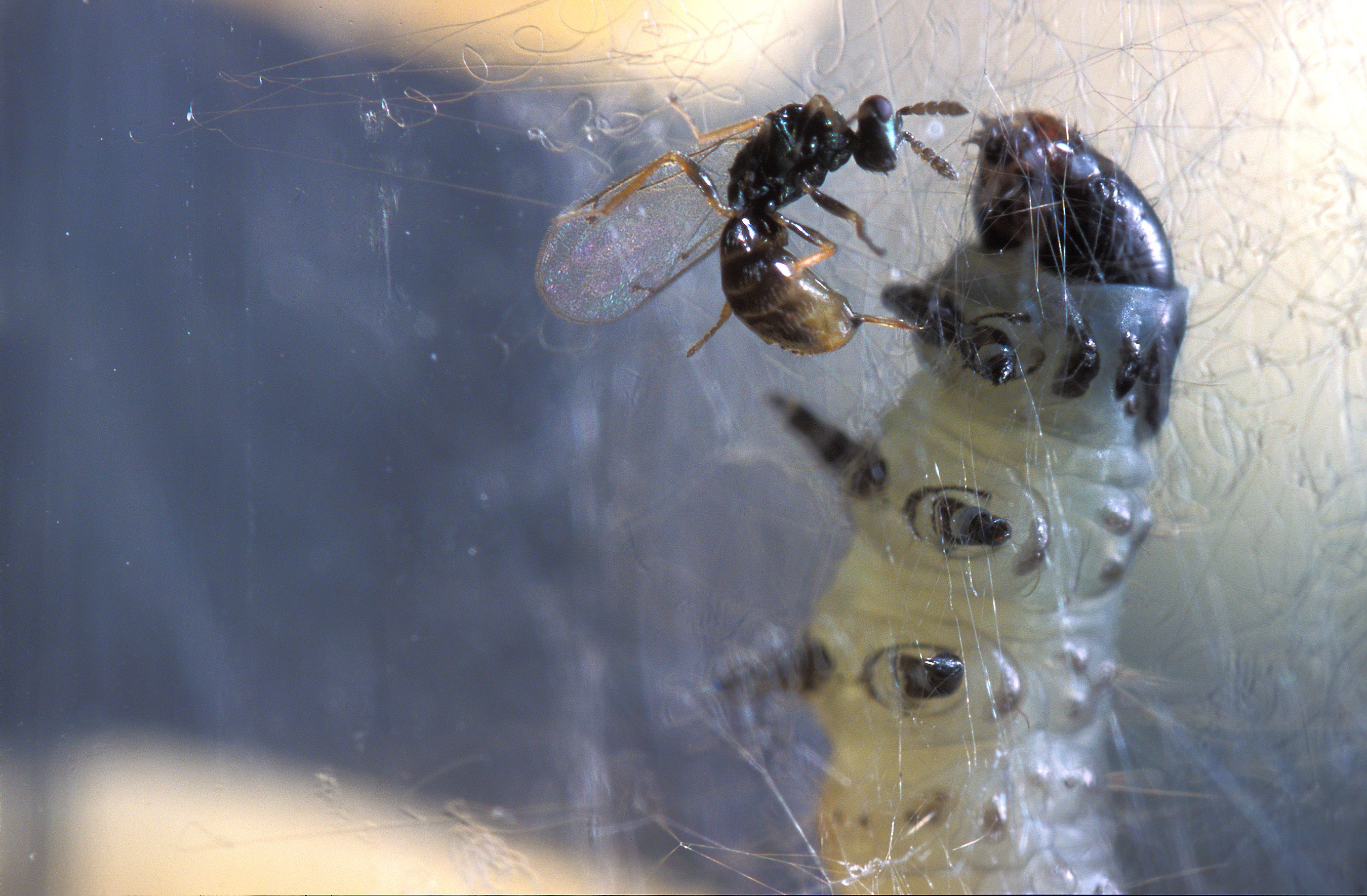
- Colpoclypeus florus

Scientific classification
- Kingdom: Animalia
- Phylum: Arthropoda
- Clade: Pancrustacea
- Class: Insecta
- Order: Hymenoptera
- Family: Eulophidae
- Subfamily: Eulophinae
- Genus: Colpoclypeus; Lucchese, 1941

Type species
- Colpoclypeus florus (Walker, 1839)

Species
- Colpoclypeus florus (Walker, 1839); Colpoclypeus michoacanensis Sanchez & Figueroa, 2011

= Colpoclypeus =

Genus of wasps

Colpoclypeus is a genus of hymenopteran insects of the family Eulophidae.
