= Dasyeulophus =

Scientific classification
- Kingdom: Animalia
- Phylum: Arthropoda
- Class: Insecta
- Order: Hymenoptera
- Family: Eulophidae
- Subfamily: Eulophinae
- Genus: Dasyeulophus; Schauff and LaSalle, 1993

Species
- Dasyeulophus gelechiae (Miller, 1964)

Genus of wasps

Dasyeulophus is a genus of hymenopteran insects of the family Eulophidae.
