= Platyplectrus =

Scientific classification
- Domain: Eukaryota
- Kingdom: Animalia
- Phylum: Arthropoda
- Class: Insecta
- Order: Hymenoptera
- Family: Eulophidae
- Subfamily: Eulophinae
- Genus: Platyplectrus; Ferriere, 1941

Type species
- Platyplectrus natadae Ferriere, 1941

Species
- 56 species

Synonyms
- Autoplectrus Gadd, 1945

Genus of wasps

Platyplectrus is a genus of hymenopteran insects of the family Eulophidae.
