= Dermatopelte =

Scientific classification
- Kingdom: Animalia
- Phylum: Arthropoda
- Clade: Pancrustacea
- Class: Insecta
- Order: Hymenoptera
- Family: Eulophidae
- Subfamily: Eulophinae
- Genus: Dermatopelte; Erdös and Novicky, 1951

Type species
- Dermatopelte budensis Erdös and Novicky, 1951

Species
- Dermatopelte bavilucus Burks and Yefremova, 2015; Dermatopelte budensis Erdös and Novicky, 1951; Dermatopelte collis Burks and Yefremova, 2015; Dermatopelte hanoica Burks and Yefremova, 2015; Dermatopelte heratyi Burks and Yefremova, 2015; Dermatopelte sinaloensis Burks, 2004; Dermatopelte yanegai Burks, 2004

Genus of wasps

Dermatopelte is a genus of hymenopteran insects of the family Eulophidae.
