= Trichospilus =

Scientific classification
- Kingdom: Animalia
- Phylum: Arthropoda
- Class: Insecta
- Order: Hymenoptera
- Family: Eulophidae
- Subfamily: Eulophinae
- Genus: Trichospilus; Ferrière, 1930

Type species
- Trichospilus pupivora Ferrière, 1930

Species
- Trichospilus albiflagellatus Yang and Wang, 2015; Trichospilus boops Boucek, 1976; Trichospilus diatraeae Cherian and Margabandhu, 1942; Trichospilus ferrierei Boucek, 1976; Trichospilus hayati Narendran, 2011; Trichospilus lutelineatus (Liao, 1987); Trichospilus politus Ubaidillah, 2006; Trichospilus pupivorus Ferrière, 1930; Trichospilus striatus Ubaidillah, 2006; Trichospilus vorax Boucek, 1976

Genus of wasps

Trichospilus is a genus of hymenopteran insects of the family Eulophidae.
