= Nesympiesis =

Scientific classification
- Domain: Eukaryota
- Kingdom: Animalia
- Phylum: Arthropoda
- Class: Insecta
- Order: Hymenoptera
- Family: Eulophidae
- Subfamily: Eulophinae
- Genus: Nesympiesis; Boucek, 1988

Species
- Nesympiesis venosa Boucek, 1988

Genus of wasps

Nesympiesis is a genus of hymenopteran insects of the family Eulophidae.
