= Notanisomorphella =

Scientific classification
- Domain: Eukaryota
- Kingdom: Animalia
- Phylum: Arthropoda
- Class: Insecta
- Order: Hymenoptera
- Family: Eulophidae
- Subfamily: Eulophinae
- Genus: Notanisomorphella; Girault, 1913

Type species
- Notanisomorphella proserpinensis Girault, 1913

Species
- 14 species

Genus of wasps

Notanisomorphella is a genus of hymenopteran insects of the family Eulophidae. They are parasitoids with hosts including Coleophoridae, leaf mining beetles, and spider eggs.
