= Paraolinx =

Scientific classification
- Domain: Eukaryota
- Kingdom: Animalia
- Phylum: Arthropoda
- Class: Insecta
- Order: Hymenoptera
- Family: Eulophidae
- Subfamily: Eulophinae
- Genus: Paraolinx; Ashmead, 1984

Type species
- Paraolinx lineatifrons Ashmead, 1984

Species
- Paraolinx Canadensis Miller, 1964; Paraolinx flaviceps (Ashmead, 1904); Paraolinx lineatifrons Ashmead, 1894; Paraolinx taedae Miller, 1964; Paraolinx trinidadensis Miller, 1964; Paraolinx typical (Howard, 1895)

Genus of wasps

Paraolinx is a genus of hymenopteran insects of the family Eulophidae.
