= Dineulophus =

Scientific classification
- Domain: Eukaryota
- Kingdom: Animalia
- Phylum: Arthropoda
- Class: Insecta
- Order: Hymenoptera
- Family: Eulophidae
- Subfamily: Eulophinae
- Genus: Dineulophus; De Santis, 1985

Type species
- Dineulophus clavicornis De Santis, 1985

Species
- Dineulophus clavicornis De Santis, 1985; Dineulophus phthorimaeae De Santis, 1985

Genus of wasps

Dineulophus is a genus of hymenopteran insects of the family Eulophidae.
