= Pseudiglyphus =

Scientific classification
- Kingdom: Animalia
- Phylum: Arthropoda
- Class: Insecta
- Order: Hymenoptera
- Family: Eulophidae
- Subfamily: Eulophinae
- Genus: Pseudiglyphus; Girault, 1915

Type species
- Pseudiglyphus grotiusi Girault, 1915

Species
- Pseudiglyphus grotiusi Girault, 1915; Pseudiglyphus orientalis Khan, Agnihotri and Sushil, 2005

Genus of wasps

Pseudiglyphus is a genus of hymenopteran insects of the family Eulophidae.
