= Eulophomyia =

Scientific classification
- Domain: Eukaryota
- Kingdom: Animalia
- Phylum: Arthropoda
- Class: Insecta
- Order: Hymenoptera
- Family: Eulophidae
- Subfamily: Eulophinae
- Genus: Eulophomyia; De Santis, 1957

Species
- Eulophomyia ecpaglus De Santis, 1957

Genus of wasps

Eulophomyia is a monotypic genus of hymenopteran insects of the family Eulophidae.
