= Oxycantha =

Scientific classification
- Kingdom: Animalia
- Phylum: Arthropoda
- Class: Insecta
- Order: Hymenoptera
- Family: Eulophidae
- Subfamily: Eulophinae
- Genus: Oxycantha; Surekha and Ubaidillah, 1996

Species
- Oxycantha darwini Surekha and Ubaidillah, 1996

Genus of wasps

Oxycantha is a genus of hymenopteran insects of the family Eulophidae.
