= Metaplectrus =

Scientific classification
- Kingdom: Animalia
- Phylum: Arthropoda
- Clade: Pancrustacea
- Class: Insecta
- Order: Hymenoptera
- Family: Eulophidae
- Subfamily: Eulophinae
- Genus: Metaplectrus; Ferrière, 1941

Type species
- Metaplectrus thoseae Ferrière, 1941

Species
- Metaplectrus lucia (Girault, 1929); Metaplectrus solitaries Gadd, 1945; Metaplectrus szepligetii (Erdös, 1951); Metaplectrus teresgaster Wijesekara and Schauff, 1994; Metaplectrus thoseae Ferrière, 1941

Synonyms
- Euplectromorpha (Trichoplectrus) Erdös, 1951; Metaplectrus Ferrière, 1941; Trichoplectrus Erdös, 1951

Genus of wasps

Metaplectrus is a genus of hymenopteran insects of the family Eulophidae.
