= Propodeochertus =

Scientific classification
- Domain: Eukaryota
- Kingdom: Animalia
- Phylum: Arthropoda
- Class: Insecta
- Order: Hymenoptera
- Family: Eulophidae
- Subfamily: Eulophinae
- Genus: Propodeochertus; Nerandran, 2011

Species
- Propodeochertus sureshani Narendran, 2011

Genus of wasps

Propodeochertus is a genus of hymenopteran insects of the family Eulophidae.
