= Elachertomorpha =

Scientific classification
- Kingdom: Animalia
- Phylum: Arthropoda
- Clade: Pancrustacea
- Class: Insecta
- Order: Hymenoptera
- Family: Eulophidae
- Subfamily: Eulophinae
- Genus: Elachertomorpha; Ashmead, 1904

Species
- Elachertomorpha flaviceps Ashmead, 1904

Genus of wasps

Elachertomorpha is a genus of hymenopteran insects of the family Eulophidae.
