= Sympiesomorpha =

Scientific classification
- Domain: Eukaryota
- Kingdom: Animalia
- Phylum: Arthropoda
- Class: Insecta
- Order: Hymenoptera
- Family: Eulophidae
- Subfamily: Eulophinae
- Genus: Sympiesomorpha; Ashmead, 1904

Type species
- Sympiesomorpha brasiliensis Ashmead, 1904

Species
- Sympiesomorpha brasiliensis Ashmead, 1904; Sympiesomorpha modesta Masi, 1917; Sympiesomorpha norfolcensis Dodd, 1924; Sympiesomorpha ornate Masi, 1917; Sympiesomorpha pulchella Masi, 1917

Genus of wasps

Sympiesomorpha is a genus of hymenopteran insects of the family Eulophidae.
