= Eulophinusia =

Scientific classification
- Domain: Eukaryota
- Kingdom: Animalia
- Phylum: Arthropoda
- Class: Insecta
- Order: Hymenoptera
- Family: Eulophidae
- Subfamily: Eulophinae
- Genus: Eulophinusia; Girault, 1913

Type species
- Eulophinusia cydippe Girault, 1913

Species
- Eulophinusia argentifasciata (Girault, 1915); Eulophinusia auritibiae (Girault, 1925); Eulophinusia cavendishi (Girault, 1915); Eulophinusia circumjecta (Girault, 1913); Eulophinusia cydippe Girault, 1913; Eulophinusia dei (Girault, 1922); Eulophinusia eja (Girault, 1921); Eulophinusia facies (Girault, 1915); Eulophinusia fasciatifrons (Girault, 1913); Eulophinusia hyatti (Girault, 1915); Eulophinusia indica (Jaikishan Singh and Khan, 1997); Eulophinusia keralensis Narendran, 2011; Eulophinusia multiguttata (Girault, 1915); Eulophinusia murarriensis (Girault, 1922); Eulophinusia pearsoni (Girault, 1915); Eulophinusia sannio (Girault, 1913); Eulophinusia spenceri (Girault, 1913); Eulophinusia thoreauini (Girault, 1915); Eulophinusia variguttata (Girault, 1916)

Synonyms
- Alophomopsis Girault; Arunus Jaikishan Singh and Khan; Babinda Girault; Elachertonecremnus Girault; Eulophinusia Girault; Grotiusella Girault; Pradeshia Koçak and Kemal

Genus of wasps

Eulophinusia is a genus of hymenopteran insects of the family Eulophidae.
