= Eulophomorpha =

Scientific classification
- Domain: Eukaryota
- Kingdom: Animalia
- Phylum: Arthropoda
- Class: Insecta
- Order: Hymenoptera
- Family: Eulophidae
- Subfamily: Eulophinae
- Genus: Eulophomorpha; Dodd, 1915

Type species
- Eulophomorpha flavicornis Dodd, 1915

Species
- Eulophomorpha clubiona Sheng & Wang, 1997; Eulophomorpha flavicornis Dodd, 1915

Genus of wasps

Eulophomorpha is a genus of hymenopteran insects of the family Eulophidae.
