= Naumanniola =

Scientific classification
- Domain: Eukaryota
- Kingdom: Animalia
- Phylum: Arthropoda
- Class: Insecta
- Order: Hymenoptera
- Family: Eulophidae
- Subfamily: Eulophinae
- Genus: Naumanniola; Boucek, 1988

Type species
- Naumanniola varians Boucek, 1988

Species
- Naumanniola ramose Boucek, 1988; Naumanniola varians Boucek, 1988

Genus of wasps

Naumanniola is a genus of hymenopteran insects of the family Eulophidae.
