= Dicladocerus =

Scientific classification
- Domain: Eukaryota
- Kingdom: Animalia
- Phylum: Arthropoda
- Class: Insecta
- Order: Hymenoptera
- Family: Eulophidae
- Subfamily: Eulophinae
- Genus: Dicladocerus; Westwood, 1832

Type species
- Dicladocerus westwoodii Westwood, 1832

Species
- 25 species

Genus of wasps

Dicladocerus is a genus of hymenopteran insects of the family Eulophidae.
