= Alophomyia =

- Alophomyia flavus

Scientific classification
- Kingdom: Animalia
- Phylum: Arthropoda
- Clade: Pancrustacea
- Class: Insecta
- Order: Hymenoptera
- Family: Eulophidae
- Subfamily: Eulophinae
- Genus: Alophomyia; Ashmead, 1904
- Species: A. flavus

Binomial name
- Alophomyia flavus Ashmead, 1904

Synonyms
- Alophus Ashmead, 1904; A. brasiliensis Ashmead, 1904

Genus of wasps

Alophomyia is a Neotropical monotypic genus of hymenopteran insects of the family Eulophidae. It was described by William Harris Ashmead in 1904. It contains the singular type species, Alophomyia flavus.

== Etymology ==
The genus gains its name from the Latin and Greek roots, a (meaning without,) lophos (meaning crest,) and myiasis (meaning fly.) Together, these roots spell out "a fly without a crest," which lines up with Ashmead's early descriptions of chalcid wasps as "chalcid flies." The specific epithet comes from the Latin root, flav, meaning yellow.

== Distribution ==
The genus is found in Brazil. This is supported by the alternate name of its type species, Alophomyia brasiliensis.
