= Grotiusomyia =

Scientific classification
- Kingdom: Animalia
- Phylum: Arthropoda
- Class: Insecta
- Order: Hymenoptera
- Family: Eulophidae
- Subfamily: Eulophinae
- Genus: Grotiusomyia; Girault, 1917

Type species
- Grotiusomyia flavicornis Girault, 1917

Species
- Grotiusomyia flavicornis Girault, 1917; Grotiusomyia nigricans (Howard, 1894)

Genus of wasps

Grotiusomyia is a genus of hymenopteran insects of the family Eulophidae.
