= Diglyphomorpha =

Scientific classification
- Domain: Eukaryota
- Kingdom: Animalia
- Phylum: Arthropoda
- Class: Insecta
- Order: Hymenoptera
- Family: Eulophidae
- Subfamily: Eulophinae
- Genus: Diglyphomorpha; Ashmead, 1904

Species
- Diglyphomorpha aurea (Howard, 1894)

Genus of wasps

Diglyphomorpha is a genus of hymenopteran insects of the family Eulophidae.
