= Skoka =

Scientific classification
- Kingdom: Animalia
- Phylum: Arthropoda
- Clade: Pancrustacea
- Class: Insecta
- Order: Hymenoptera
- Family: Eulophidae
- Subfamily: Eulophinae
- Genus: Skoka; Bouček, 1988
- Species: S. femorata

Binomial name
- Skoka femorata Bouček, 1988

Genus of wasps

Skoka is a monotypic genus of Hymenopteran insects of the family Eulophidae. It contains the singular species, Skoka femorata, that is found in Papua New Guinea, and was described by Bouček in 1988. It is known for having unusually strong hind legs, with which it can jump. Its notably incomplete notauli suggest it often uses jumping as an alternative to flight, as notauli are grooves that are directly created by flight muscles pulling on the insect's shell. Therefore, their shallowness indicates a subtle lack of flight.

== Etymology ==
The genus' name comes from the Czech word, skok, which means to hop, or jump. The specific epithet comes from the Latin root, femorata, referring to that with the structure of a thigh. It is named after that due to its prominent hind legs.
