= Austeulophus =

Scientific classification
- Kingdom: Animalia
- Phylum: Arthropoda
- Clade: Pancrustacea
- Class: Insecta
- Order: Hymenoptera
- Family: Eulophidae
- Subfamily: Eulophinae
- Genus: Austeulophus; Bouček, 1988

Species
- Austeulophus bicolor Bouček, 1988

Genus of wasps

Austeulophus is a genus of hymenopteran insects of the family Eulophidae.
