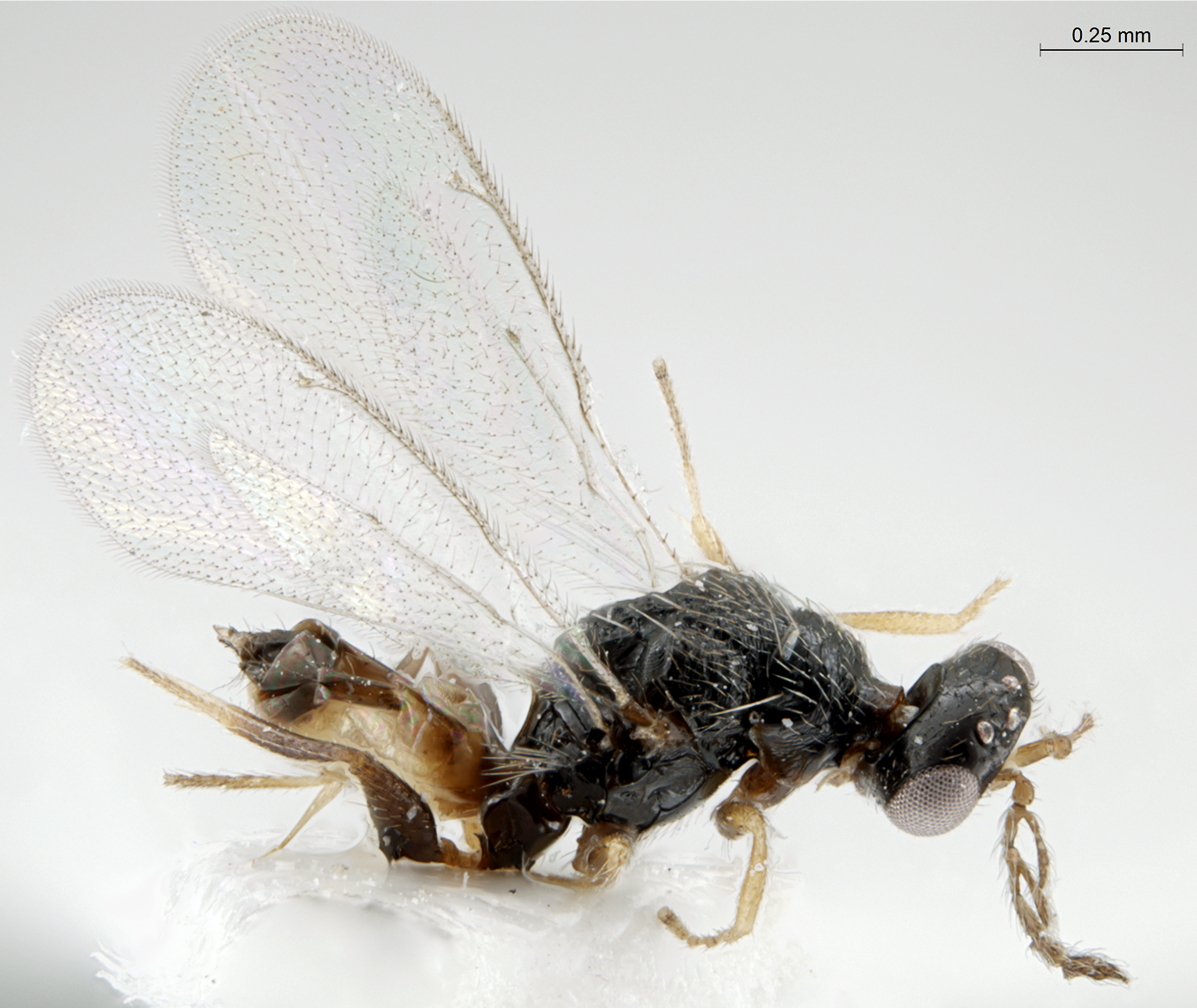
- Ramiplectrus catiensis

Scientific classification
- Domain: Eukaryota
- Kingdom: Animalia
- Phylum: Arthropoda
- Class: Insecta
- Order: Hymenoptera
- Family: Eulophidae
- Subfamily: Eulophinae
- Genus: Ramiplectrus; Yefremova & Feldstein-Farkash 2025
- Species: R. catiensis

Binomial name
- Ramiplectrus catiensis Yefremova & Feldstein-Farkash 2025

= Ramiplectrus =

Genus of wasps

Ramiplectrus is a monotypic genus of hymenopteran insects of the family Eulophidae (subfamily Eulophinae, tribe Eulophini) and is characterized by the unique combination of two long metatibial spurs and a short branch on each of the first two funicular segments. So far, the genus is only known from Cát Tiên National Park in Vietnam.
