= Setelacher =

Scientific classification
- Kingdom: Animalia
- Phylum: Arthropoda
- Class: Insecta
- Order: Hymenoptera
- Family: Eulophidae
- Subfamily: Eulophinae
- Genus: Setelacher; Boucek, 1988

Species
- Setelacher fasciatus Boucek, 1988

Genus of wasps

Setelacher is a genus of hymenopteran insects of the family Eulophidae.
