= Hayatiola =

Scientific classification
- Domain: Eukaryota
- Kingdom: Animalia
- Phylum: Arthropoda
- Class: Insecta
- Order: Hymenoptera
- Family: Eulophidae
- Subfamily: Eulophinae
- Genus: Hayatiola; Narendran, 2006

Species
- Hayatiola macrocephala Narendran, 2006

Genus of wasps

Hayatiola is a genus of hymenopteran insects of the family Eulophidae.
