= Ginsiella =

Scientific classification
- Kingdom: Animalia
- Phylum: Arthropoda
- Class: Insecta
- Order: Hymenoptera
- Family: Eulophidae
- Subfamily: Eulophinae
- Genus: Ginsiella; Erdős, 1951

Type species
- Ginsiella triarticulata Erdős, 1951

Species
- Ginsiella indica Arifa & Khan, 1992; Ginsiella triarticulata Erdős, 1951

Genus of wasps

Ginsiella is a genus of hymenopteran insects of the family Eulophidae.
