= Mohaniella =

Scientific classification
- Domain: Eukaryota
- Kingdom: Animalia
- Phylum: Arthropoda
- Class: Insecta
- Order: Hymenoptera
- Family: Eulophidae
- Subfamily: Eulophinae
- Genus: Mohaniella; Khan, 1995

Species
- Mohaniella indica Khan, 1995

Genus of wasps

Mohaniella is a genus of hymenopteran insects of the family Eulophidae.
