= Hoplocrepis =

Scientific classification
- Kingdom: Animalia
- Phylum: Arthropoda
- Class: Insecta
- Order: Hymenoptera
- Family: Eulophidae
- Subfamily: Eulophinae
- Genus: Hoplocrepis; Ashmead, 1890

Type species
- Hoplocrepis albiclavus Ashmead, 1890

Genus of wasps

Hoplocrepis is a genus of hymenopteran insects of the family Eulophidae.

== Species ==
- Hoplocrepis albiclavus, Ashmead, 1890
- Hoplocrepis bifasciata, Ashmead, 1904
- Hoplocrepis brasiliensis, Ashmead, 1904
- Hoplocrepis grenadensis, Howard, 1897
- Hoplocrepis mexicana, Yefremova, 2003
