= Miotropis =

Scientific classification
- Domain: Eukaryota
- Kingdom: Animalia
- Phylum: Arthropoda
- Class: Insecta
- Order: Hymenoptera
- Family: Eulophidae
- Subfamily: Eulophinae
- Genus: Miotropis; Thomson, 1878

Type species
- Miotropis unipuncta (Nees, 1834)

Species
- 15 species

Synonyms
- Mionotropis Sculz, 1906; Stenomesioidea Girault, 1916; Stenomesioideus Ashmead, 1904

Genus of wasps

Miotropis is a genus of hymenopteran insects of the family Eulophidae.
