= Melittobiopsis =

Scientific classification
- Domain: Eukaryota
- Kingdom: Animalia
- Phylum: Arthropoda
- Class: Insecta
- Order: Hymenoptera
- Family: Eulophidae
- Subfamily: Eulophinae
- Genus: Melittobiopsis; Timberlake, 1962

Species
- Melittobiopsis ereunetiphila Timberlake, 1926

Genus of wasps

Melittobiopsis is a genus of hymenopteran insects of the family Eulophidae.
