= Diglyphus =

Scientific classification
- Domain: Eukaryota
- Kingdom: Animalia
- Phylum: Arthropoda
- Class: Insecta
- Order: Hymenoptera
- Family: Eulophidae
- Subfamily: Eulophinae
- Genus: Diglyphus; Walker, 1844

Type species
- Diglyphus chabrias (Walker, 1838)

Species
- 41 species

Genus of wasps

Diglyphus is a genus of hymenopteran insects of the family Eulophidae. It is a parasitoid of Agromyzidae larvae, and therefore sometimes used in biological pest control.
