= Eurycephaloplectrus =

Scientific classification
- Domain: Eukaryota
- Kingdom: Animalia
- Phylum: Arthropoda
- Class: Insecta
- Order: Hymenoptera
- Family: Eulophidae
- Subfamily: Eulophinae
- Genus: Eurycephaloplectrus; Wijesekara & Schauff, 1997

Type species
- Eurycephaloplectrus colombianus Wijesekara & Schauff, 1997

Species
- Eurycephaloplectrus colombianus Wijesekara & Schauff, 1997; Eurycephaloplectrus natadae (Chandy Kurian, 1954)

Genus of wasps

Eurycephaloplectrus is a genus of hymenopteran insects of the family Eulophidae.
