= Dichatomus =

Scientific classification
- Domain: Eukaryota
- Kingdom: Animalia
- Phylum: Arthropoda
- Class: Insecta
- Order: Hymenoptera
- Family: Eulophidae
- Subfamily: Eulophinae
- Genus: Dichatomus; Förster, 1878

Type species
- Dichatomus acerinus Förster, 1878

Species
- Dichatomus acerinus Förster, 1878; Dichatomus notatus Suciu, 1980

Genus of wasps

Dichatomus is a genus of hymenopteran insects of the family Eulophidae.
