= Cirrospiloidelleus =

Scientific classification
- Domain: Eukaryota
- Kingdom: Animalia
- Phylum: Arthropoda
- Class: Insecta
- Order: Hymenoptera
- Family: Eulophidae
- Subfamily: Eulophinae
- Genus: Cirrospiloidelleus; Girault, 1913

Species
- Cirrospiloidelleus bicolor Girault, 1913

Genus of wasps

Cirrospiloidelleus is a genus of hymenopteran insects of the family Eulophidae.
