= Arachnolophus =

Scientific classification
- Kingdom: Animalia
- Phylum: Arthropoda
- Clade: Pancrustacea
- Class: Insecta
- Order: Hymenoptera
- Family: Eulophidae
- Subfamily: Eulophinae
- Genus: Arachnolophus; Kamijo, 1996
- Species: A. dentatus

Binomial name
- Arachnolophus dentatus Kamijo, 1996

Genus of wasps

Arachnolophus is an eastern Palearctic genus of chalcid wasps in the family Eulophidae; it contains the single species Arachnolophus dentatus. The genus and species were described by Kazuaki Kamijo in 1996. It uses the araneomorph species Cheiracanthium japonicum as its host. It can be found in Japan (Hokkaido, Honshu, and Kyushu) and Korea.

== Etymology ==
The genus name is a combination of the Greek root arachn- (meaning spider) and the genus name Eulophus. The specific epithet comes from the Latin root dent- (which means tooth).
