= Alibertia (wasp) =

Scientific classification
- Kingdom: Animalia
- Phylum: Arthropoda
- Clade: Pancrustacea
- Class: Insecta
- Order: Hymenoptera
- Family: Eulophidae
- Subfamily: Eulophinae
- Genus: Alibertia; Risbec, 1951
- Species: A. theobromae

Binomial name
- Alibertia theobromae Risbec, 1951

Genus of wasps

Alibertia is a genus of hymenopteran insects of the family Eulophidae. Species can be found in Brazil, in Manaus. It contains the singular species Alibertia theobromae, that was described by Jean Risbec in 1951.
