= Meruacesa =

Scientific classification
- Kingdom: Animalia
- Phylum: Arthropoda
- Clade: Pancrustacea
- Class: Insecta
- Order: Hymenoptera
- Family: Eulophidae
- Subfamily: Eulophinae
- Genus: Meruacesa; Koçak and Kemal, 2009

Type species
- Meruacesa elegans (Delucchi, 1962)

Species
- Meruacesa arabica Narendran and Subair Ahmad, 2012; Meruacesa camerounensis (Risbec, 1955); Meruacesa cuprata (Ferrière, 1960); Meruacesa elegans (Delucchi, 1962); Meruacesa liriomyzae (Boucek, 1988)

Synonyms
- Meruana Delucchi, 1962

Genus of wasps

Meruacesa is a genus in the family Eulophidae. It was formerly known as Meruana but this is now considered a junior homonym, due to the name being preoccupied by an East African genus of grasshoppers in the family Acrididae.
