= Semielacher =

Scientific classification
- Kingdom: Animalia
- Phylum: Arthropoda
- Class: Insecta
- Order: Hymenoptera
- Family: Eulophidae
- Subfamily: Eulophinae
- Genus: Semielacher; Boucek, 1988

Type species
- Semielacher silvicola Boucek, 1988

Species
- Semielacher petiolate (Girault, 1915); Semielacher silvicola Boucek, 1988

Genus of wasps

Semielacher is a genus of hymenopteran insects of the family Eulophidae. One species, Semielacher petiolate, is used in biological pest control against Phyllocnistis citrella.
