= Boucekiola =

Scientific classification
- Domain: Eukaryota
- Kingdom: Animalia
- Phylum: Arthropoda
- Class: Insecta
- Order: Hymenoptera
- Family: Eulophidae
- Subfamily: Eulophinae
- Genus: Boucekiola; Narendran, 2005

Species
- Boucekiola malabarica Narendran, 2005

Genus of wasps

Boucekiola is a genus of hymenopteran insects of the family Eulophidae.
