= Pauahiana =

Scientific classification
- Domain: Eukaryota
- Kingdom: Animalia
- Phylum: Arthropoda
- Class: Insecta
- Order: Hymenoptera
- Family: Eulophidae
- Subfamily: Eulophinae
- Genus: Pauahiana; Yoshimoto, 1965

Type species
- Pauahiana swezeyi Yoshimoto, 1965

Species
- Pauahiana lineata Yoshimoto, 1965; Pauahiana maculatipennis (Ashmead, 1901); Pauahiana metallica Yoshimoto, 1965; Pauahiana swezeyi Yoshimoto, 1965

Genus of wasps

Pauahiana is a genus of hymenopteran insects of the family Eulophidae.
