= Necremnus =

Scientific classification
- Domain: Eukaryota
- Kingdom: Animalia
- Phylum: Arthropoda
- Class: Insecta
- Order: Hymenoptera
- Family: Eulophidae
- Subfamily: Eulophinae
- Genus: Necremnus; Thomson, 1878

Type species
- Necremnus leucarthros (Nees, 1834)

Species
- 40 Species

Genus of wasps

Necremnus is a genus of hymenopteran insects of the family Eulophidae.

== Species ==
Including:

- N. artynes
- N. cosmopterix
- N. leucarthros
- N. tutae
