= Renaniana =

Scientific classification
- Kingdom: Animalia
- Phylum: Arthropoda
- Class: Insecta
- Order: Hymenoptera
- Family: Eulophidae
- Subfamily: Eulophinae
- Genus: Renaniana; Girault, 1931

Species
- Renaniana mirissima Girault, 1931

Genus of wasps

Renaniana is a genus of hymenopteran insects of the family Eulophidae.
