= Microlycus =

Scientific classification
- Domain: Eukaryota
- Kingdom: Animalia
- Phylum: Arthropoda
- Class: Insecta
- Order: Hymenoptera
- Family: Eulophidae
- Subfamily: Eulophinae
- Genus: Microlycus; Thomson, 1878

Type species
- Microlycus heterocerus Thomson, 1878

Species
- Microlycus biroi Erdös, 1951; Microlycus erdoesi Boucek, 1959; Microlycus gyorfii (Erdös, 1954); Microlycus harcalo (Walker, 1852); Microlycus heterocerus Thomson, 1878; Microlycus hungaricus Özdikmen, 2011; Microlycus pulcherrimus Kerrich, 1969; Microlycus scaurus Askew, 2001; Microlycus virens Erdös, 1951

Synonyms
- Neolachertus Szelényi, 1976

Genus of wasps

Microlycus is a genus of hymenopteran insects of the family Eulophidae.
