= Cristelacher =

Scientific classification
- Domain: Eukaryota
- Kingdom: Animalia
- Phylum: Arthropoda
- Class: Insecta
- Order: Hymenoptera
- Family: Eulophidae
- Subfamily: Eulophinae
- Genus: Cristelacher; Schauff and LaSalle, 1993

Species
- Cristelacher levana (Walker, 1847)

Genus of wasps

Cristelacher is a genus of hymenopteran insects of the family Eulophidae.
