= Ogmoelachertus =

Scientific classification
- Kingdom: Animalia
- Phylum: Arthropoda
- Class: Insecta
- Order: Hymenoptera
- Family: Eulophidae
- Subfamily: Eulophinae
- Genus: Ogmoelachertus; Schauff, 2000

Species
- Ogmoelachertus mandibularis Schauff, 2000

Genus of wasps

Ogmoelachertus is a genus of hymenopteran insects of the family Eulophidae.
