= Necremnoides =

Scientific classification
- Kingdom: Animalia
- Phylum: Arthropoda
- Class: Insecta
- Order: Hymenoptera
- Family: Eulophidae
- Subfamily: Eulophinae
- Genus: Necremnoides; Girault, 1913

Type species
- Necremnoides tricarinatus Girault, 1913

Species
- Necremnoides fulvipropodeum Girault, 1915; Necremnoides harithodaris Narendran, 2005; Necremnoides tricarinatus Girault, 1913

Genus of wasps

Necremnoides is a genus of hymenopteran insects of the family Eulophidae.
