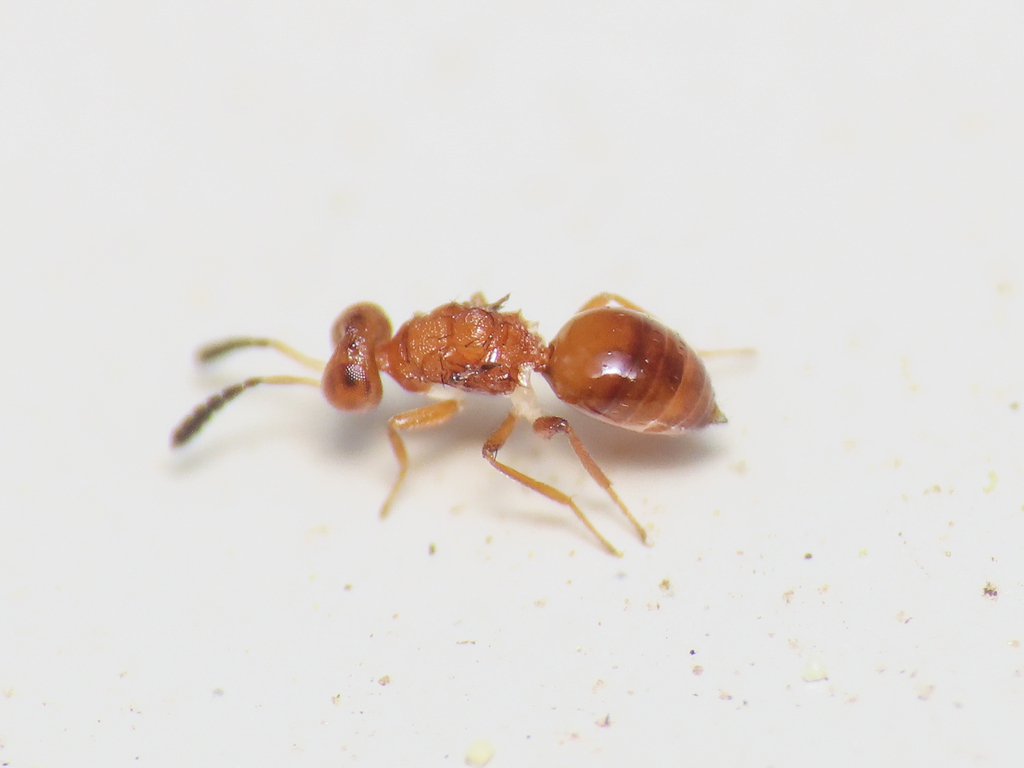
- Xanthella szabopatayi from Italy

Scientific classification
- Kingdom: Animalia
- Phylum: Arthropoda
- Clade: Pancrustacea
- Class: Insecta
- Order: Hymenoptera
- Family: Eulophidae
- Subfamily: Eulophinae
- Genus: Xanthella; Moczár, 1950

Species
- Xanthella szabopatayi Moczár, 1950

= Xanthella =

Genus of wasps

Xanthella is a genus of Hymenoptera from the family Eulophidae.
