= Tylomischus =

Scientific classification
- Domain: Eukaryota
- Kingdom: Animalia
- Phylum: Arthropoda
- Class: Insecta
- Order: Hymenoptera
- Family: Eulophidae
- Subfamily: Eulophinae
- Genus: Tylomischus; De Santis, 1972

Type species
- Tylomischus flavitibiae De Santis, 1972

Species
- Tylomischus areolatum De Santis, 1972; Tylomischus flavitibiae De Santis, 1972

Genus of wasps

Tylomischus is a genus of hymenopteran insects of the family Eulophidae.
