= Diaulomorpha =

Scientific classification
- Domain: Eukaryota
- Kingdom: Animalia
- Phylum: Arthropoda
- Class: Insecta
- Order: Hymenoptera
- Family: Eulophidae
- Subfamily: Eulophinae
- Genus: Diaulomorpha; Ashmead, 1900

Type species
- Diaulomorpha pulchra (Girault, 1913)

Species
- Diaulomorpha aeneiscapus (Girault, 1926); Diaulomorpha arboris (Girault, 1924); Diaulomorpha asperitergum (Girault, 1915); Diaulomorpha australiensis Ashmead, 1900; Diaulomorpha calvaria (De Santis, 1955); Diaulomorpha chinchillae (Girault, 1933); Diaulomorpha cicuta (Walker, 1839); Diaulomorpha floris (Girault, 1922); Diaulomorpha itea (Walker, 1839); Diaulomorpha maculatipennis (Girault, 1913); Diaulomorpha nigroaenea (Girault, 1929); Diaulomorpha niveipes (Girault, 1915); Diaulomorpha pulchra (Girault, 1913); Diaulomorpha telestas (Walker, 1839)

Genus of wasps

Diaulomorpha is a genus of hymenopteran insects of the family Eulophidae.
