= Rhicnopelte =

Scientific classification
- Kingdom: Animalia
- Phylum: Arthropoda
- Class: Insecta
- Order: Hymenoptera
- Family: Eulophidae
- Subfamily: Eulophinae
- Genus: Rhicnopelte; Förster, 1878

Species
- Rhicnopelte crassicornis (Nees, 1834)

Genus of wasps

Rhicnopelte is a genus of hymenopteran insects of the family Eulophidae.
