= Euplectrophelinus =

Scientific classification
- Kingdom: Animalia
- Phylum: Arthropoda
- Class: Insecta
- Order: Hymenoptera
- Family: Eulophidae
- Subfamily: Eulophinae
- Genus: Euplectrophelinus; Girault, 1913

Type species
- Euplectrophelinus saintpierrei Girault, 1913

Species
- Euplectrophelinus meridionalis (Risbec, 1952); Euplectrophelinus saintpierrei Girault, 1913

Genus of wasps

Euplectrophelinus is a genus of hymenopteran insects of the family Eulophidae.
