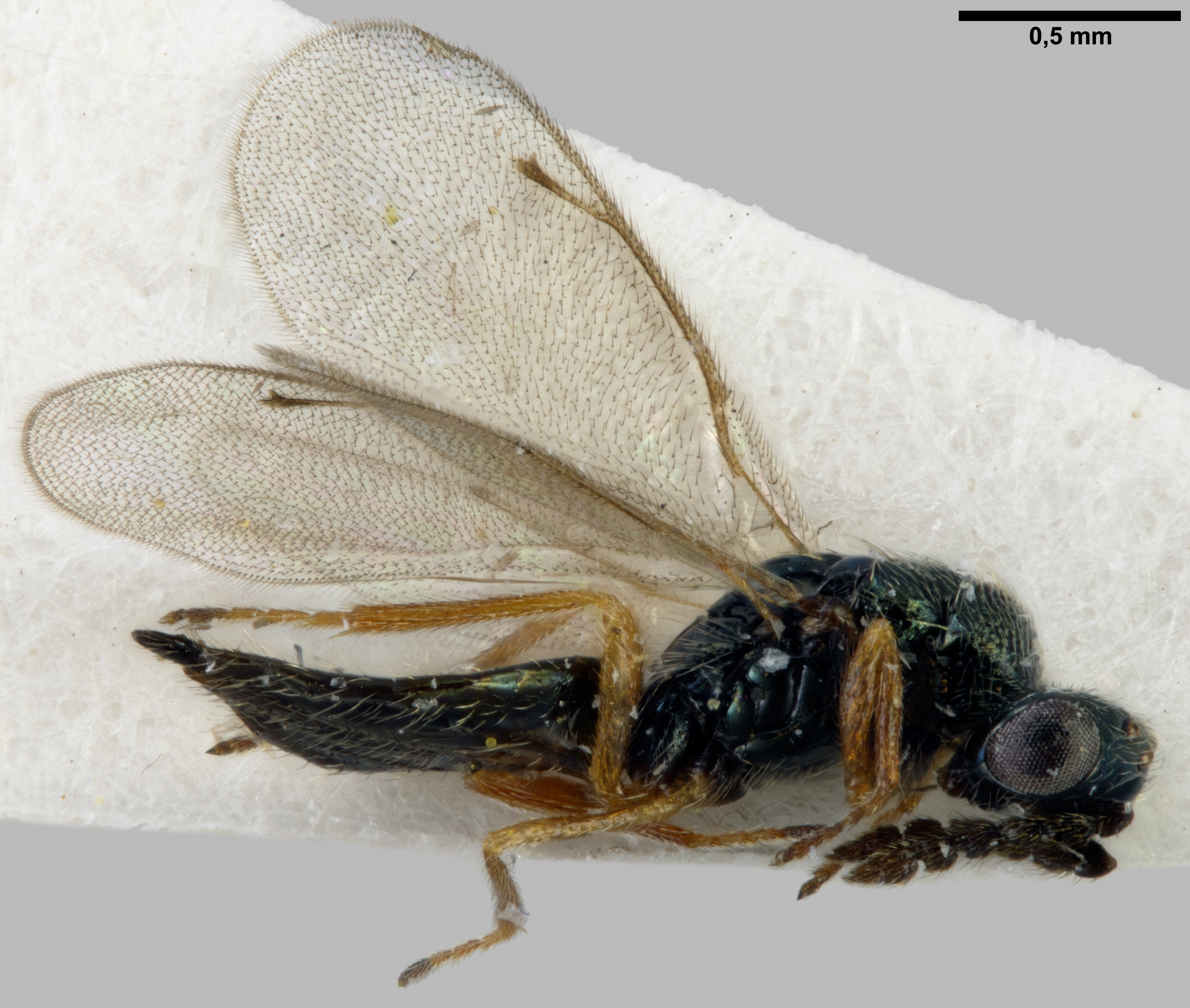
- Elachertus isadas

Scientific classification
- Domain: Eukaryota
- Kingdom: Animalia
- Phylum: Arthropoda
- Class: Insecta
- Order: Hymenoptera
- Family: Eulophidae
- Subfamily: Eulophinae
- Genus: Elachertus; Spinola, 1811

Type species
- Elachertus lateralis (Spinola, 1808)

Species
- 106 Species

= Elachertus =

Genus of wasps

Elachertus is a genus of hymenopteran insects of the family Eulophidae.
