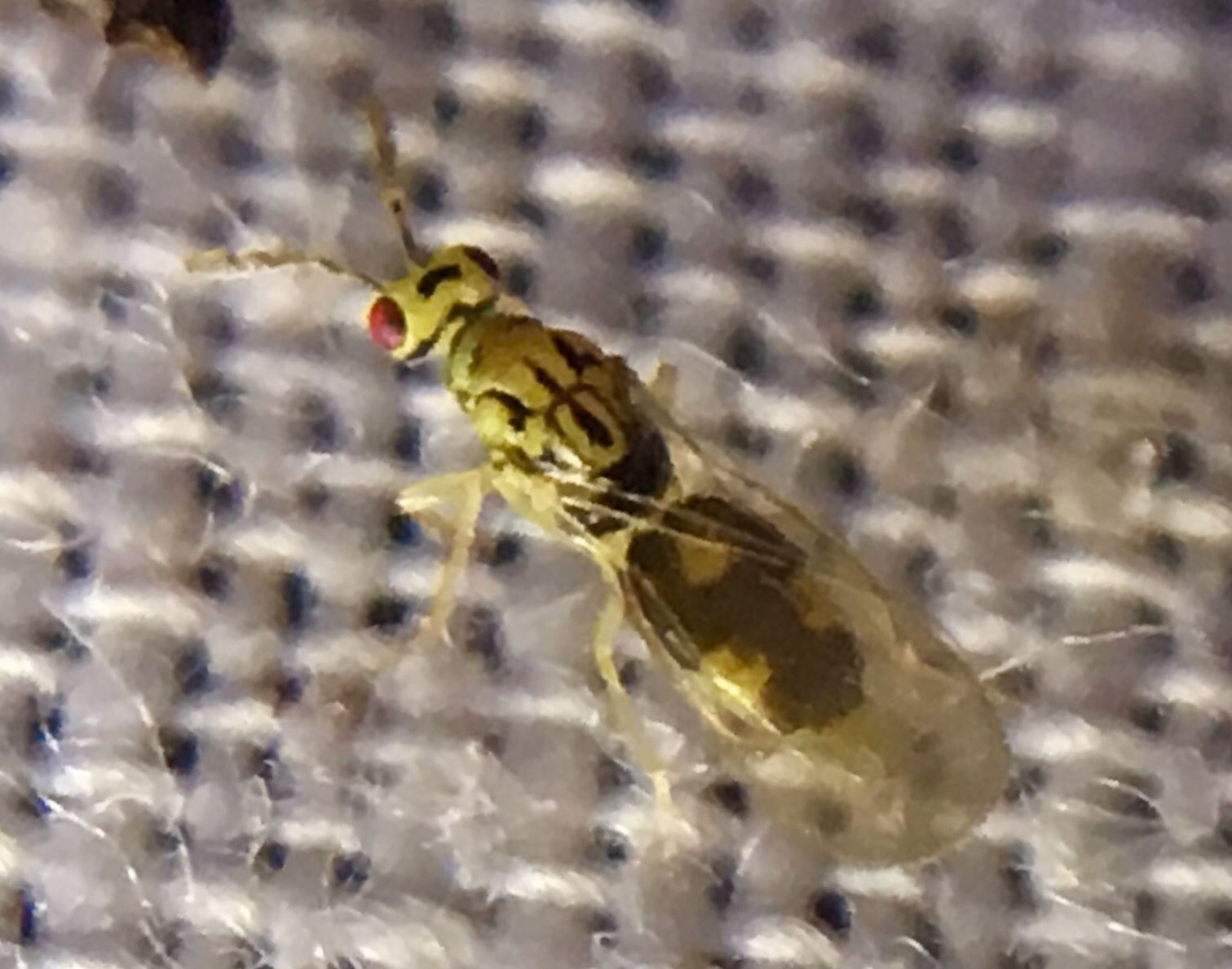

Scientific classification
- Kingdom: Animalia
- Phylum: Arthropoda
- Clade: Pancrustacea
- Class: Insecta
- Order: Hymenoptera
- Family: Eulophidae
- Subfamily: Eulophinae
- Genus: Cirrospilus; Westwood, 1832

Type species
- Cirrospilus pax Girault, 1913

Species
- See text

= Cirrospilus =

Genus of wasps

Cirrospilus is a genus of hymenopteran insects in the family Eulophidae which includes 162 species.

== Species ==
- Cirrospilus abalus Narendran, 2011
- Cirrospilus acadius Narendran, 2011
- Cirrospilus aeneipropodeum Girault, 1915
- Cirrospilus aeneus Girault, 1929
- Cirrospilus aereiguttatus Girault, 1915
- Cirrospilus afer Silvestri, 1914
- Cirrospilus alternatus Bouček, 1977
- Cirrospilus americanus Girault, 1916
- Cirrospilus argei Crawford, 1911
- Cirrospilus arnoldi Girault, 1913
- Cirrospilus asopus Walker, 1839
- Cirrospilus atoposomoides Girault, 1915
- Cirrospilus atripropodeum Girault, 1926
- Cirrospilus bifasciatifrons Girault, 1916
- Cirrospilus biguttatus Girault, 1913
- Cirrospilus bioculativentris Girault, 1915
- Cirrospilus bracteatus Girault, 1915
- Cirrospilus brevicorpus Shafee & Rizvi, 1988
- Cirrospilus carinatus Girault, 1913
- Cirrospilus caspicus Bouček, 1971
- Cirrospilus centralis Zhu, LaSalle & Huang, 2002
- Cirrospilus channingi Girault, 1913
- Cirrospilus channingianus Bouček, 1988
- Cirrospilus cinctithorax Girault, 1916
- Cirrospilus coachellae Gates, 2000
- Cirrospilus coccivorus Motschulsky, 1863
- Cirrospilus coleophorae Yang & Yao, 2015
- Cirrospilus columbia Girault, 1917
- Cirrospilus consobrinus Girault, 1913
- Cirrospilus coptodiscae Girault, 1916
- Cirrospilus coracipennellae Förster 1975
- Cirrospilus cosmopterygi Risbec, 1951
- Cirrospilus curvineurus Askew, 1965
- Cirrospilus cyanops Goureau, 1851
- Cirrospilus daimachus Walker, 1839
- Cirrospilus denitus Narendran, 2011
- Cirrospilus diallus Walker, 1838
- Cirrospilus dispersus Zhu, LaSalle & Huang, 2002
- Cirrospilus divergens Zhu, LaSalle & Huang, 2002
- Cirrospilus dodoneae Risbec, 1952
- Cirrospilus duplolineatus Girault, 1915
- Cirrospilus electus Bouček, 1988
- Cirrospilus elegantissimus Westwood, 1832
- Cirrospilus enagoras Walker, 1839
- Cirrospilus eunapius Walker, 1847
- Cirrospilus fasciatus Girault, 1913
- Cirrospilus februus Walker, 1839
- Cirrospilus festivus Girault, 1915
- Cirrospilus flavicinctus Riley, 1883
- Cirrospilus flavifacies Girault, 1916
- Cirrospilus flavitibia Girault, 1929
- Cirrospilus floridensis Evans, 1999
- Cirrospilus fuscipennis Girault, 1916
- Cirrospilus fuscus Girault, 1913
- Cirrospilus gemma Girault, 1916
- Cirrospilus giraulti Peck, 1951
- Cirrospilus glycon Walker, 1839
- Cirrospilus gracielae De Santis, 1994
- Cirrospilus gracilis Girault, 1915
- Cirrospilus gregi Girault, 1913
- Cirrospilus grotiusi Girault, 1913
- Cirrospilus habachi Ii, 1936
- Cirrospilus hemansi Girault, 1939
- Cirrospilus hopkinsi Girault, 1915
- Cirrospilus huangyanensis Yang & Ren, 1998
- Cirrospilus immaculativentris Girault, 1915
- Cirrospilus immaculatus Ashmead, 1902
- Cirrospilus infuscatus Gates & Schauff, 2003
- Cirrospilus ingenuus Gahan, 1932
- Cirrospilus inimicus Gahan, 1934
- Cirrospilus insculptus Zhu, LaSalle & Huang, 2002
- Cirrospilus ione Walker, 1839
- Cirrospilus iphigenia Girault, 1939
- Cirrospilus isonoi Kamijo, 1987
- Cirrospilus jiangxiensis Sheng & Wang, 1992
- Cirrospilus kanpurensis Shafee & Rizvi, 1988
- Cirrospilus kochetkovi Kosheleva, 2024
- Cirrospilus kumatai Kamijo, 1992
- Cirrospilus lanei Girault, 1913
- Cirrospilus lateroguttatus Girault, 1915
- Cirrospilus longifasciatus Ferrière, 1936
- Cirrospilus longstigmae Yang & Cao, 2015
- Cirrospilus lyncus Walker, 1838
- Cirrospilus margiscutellum Girault, 1939
- Cirrospilus marilandi Girault, 1917
- Cirrospilus marilandicus Girault, 1917
- Cirrospilus mazzinini Girault, 1913
- Cirrospilus metallicus Girault, 1917
- Cirrospilus mimsalatis Yang & Cao, 2015 ㅤ ㅤ ㅤ ㅤ ㅤ
- Cirrospilus miriguttatus Girault, 1915
- Cirrospilus mirilineatus Girault, 1915
- Cirrospilus multilineatus Ashmead, 1888
- Cirrospilus multipunctum Girault, 1915
- Cirrospilus neotropicus Diez & Fidalgo, 2004
- Cirrospilus nephelodes Graham, 1981
- Cirrospilus niger Howard, 1889
- Cirrospilus nigrifemur Zhu, LaSalle & Huang, 2002
- Cirrospilus nigriscutum Girault, 1915
- Cirrospilus nigrivariegatus Girault, 1915
- Cirrospilus nireus Walker, 1839
- Cirrospilus noyesi Özdikmen, 2011
- Cirrospilus occidentalis Girault, 1915
- Cirrospilus occipitis Girault, 1928
- Cirrospilus ocellatus Girault, 1917
- Cirrospilus ornatus Mukerjee, 1975
- Cirrospilus orsedice Walker, 1839
- Cirrospilus ovisugosus Crosby & Matheson, 1915
- Cirrospilus pacis Bouček, 1988
- Cirrospilus partiaeneiceps Girault, 1917
- Cirrospilus particolor Girault, 1915
- Cirrospilus pax Girault, 1913
- Cirrospilus persicus Lotfalizadeh & Delvare, 2011
- Cirrospilus perticus Zhu, LaSalle & Huang, 2002
- Cirrospilus phorbas Walker, 1838
- Cirrospilus phyllocnistis Ishii, 1953
- Cirrospilus pictus Nees, 1834
- Cirrospilus polygoniae Risbec, 1951
- Cirrospilus pondicheri Narendran, 2011
- Cirrospilus pulchellus Bouček, 1988
- Cirrospilus pulcher Masi, 1911
- Cirrospilus pulcheria Girault, 1917
- Cirrospilus purpureus Ashmead, 1886
- Cirrospilus quadrifasciatus Girault, 1913
- Cirrospilus quinquefasciatus Girault, 1915
- Cirrospilus rarifasciatus Girault, 1915
- Cirrospilus rhadius Walker, 1839
- Cirrospilus ringoniellae Kamijo, 1987
- Cirrospilus ruskini Girault, 1916
- Cirrospilus rusticus Girault, 1913
- Cirrospilus saintpierrei Girault, 1913
- Cirrospilus salatis Walker, 1838
- Cirrospilus sapientia Girault, 1917
- Cirrospilus scapus Yefremova, 2007
- Cirrospilus setipes Askew, 1982
- Cirrospilus silvae Girault, 1916
- Cirrospilus speciosissimus Girault, 1913
- Cirrospilus speciosus Girault, 1913
- Cirrospilus staryi Bouček, 1959
- Cirrospilus striatus Zhu, LaSalle & Huang, 2002
- Cirrospilus suaedaegallarum Viggiani, 1971
- Cirrospilus submedialis Zhu, LaSalle & Huang, 2002
- Cirrospilus tau Girault, 1915
- Cirrospilus tenerus Walker, 1839
- Cirrospilus tineivora Risbec, 1951
- Cirrospilus tischeriae Kamijo, 1992
- Cirrospilus transrugosus Zhu, LaSalle & Huang, 2002
- Cirrospilus tricuspidatus Sheng, 1994
- Cirrospilus trilongilineatus Girault, 1915
- Cirrospilus unguttatipennis Girault, 1916
- Cirrospilus unguttatipes Girault, 1915
- Cirrospilus ussuriensis Kosheleva, 2022
- Cirrospilus vaccus Walker, 1839
- Cirrospilus variegatum Masi, 1907
- Cirrospilus varifasciata Girault, 1915
- Cirrospilus virgatus Yefremova, 2008
- Cirrospilus viridilineatus Froggatt, 1905
- Cirrospilus viridipronotum Girault, 1915
- Cirrospilus viticola Rondani, 1877
- Cirrospilus vittatus Walker, 1838
- Cirrospilus worcesteri Girault, 1913
- Cirrospilus zaleucus Walker, 1839
- Cirrospilus zolai Girault, 1913
