= József Erdös =

Hungarian entomologist (1900–1971)

József Erdős
- Born: 9 March 1900; Bačko Petrovo Selo, Austria-Hungary
- Died: 1 August 1971 (aged 71); Székesfehérvár, Hungary
- Known for: Research on beetles (Coleoptera)
- Awards: Imre Frivaldszky Memorial Plaque (1964)
- Scientific career
- Fields: Entomology, Theology
- Workplaces: Archdiocesan Teachers’ Training Institute, Kalocsa

József Erdős (9 March 1900 – 1 August 1971) was a Hungarian Roman Catholic priest, head of a teachers’ training institute and entomologist.

== Biography ==
He was the son of Sándor Erdős and Mária Kovács. Between 1910 and 1918, he studied at the gymnasium in Kalocsa. From 1918 to 1922, he studied theology in Kalocsa and was ordained as a priest on 13 August 1922 in Bácsalmás. In 1923 he served in Jánoshalma, and in 1926 in Baja as chaplain and religion teacher. In 1930 he became a religion teacher and cathedral preacher in Kalocsa.

In 1931 he was a university student in Szeged, and he received his doctorate in 1935. He then became a theology teacher at the archdiocesan teachers’ training institute in Kalocsa. In 1938 he was appointed vice-rector of the theological college, and from 1939 to 1948 he served as director of the archdiocesan teachers’ training and kindergarten teachers’ training colleges.

== Works ==
- The floodplain beetle fauna at the confluence of the Maros from a biological perspective (dissertation, Szeged, 1935)
- The Hungarian species of the genus Entedon Dalm. (Kalocsa, 1944)

== Awards ==
- Imre Frivaldszky Memorial Plaque (1964)
