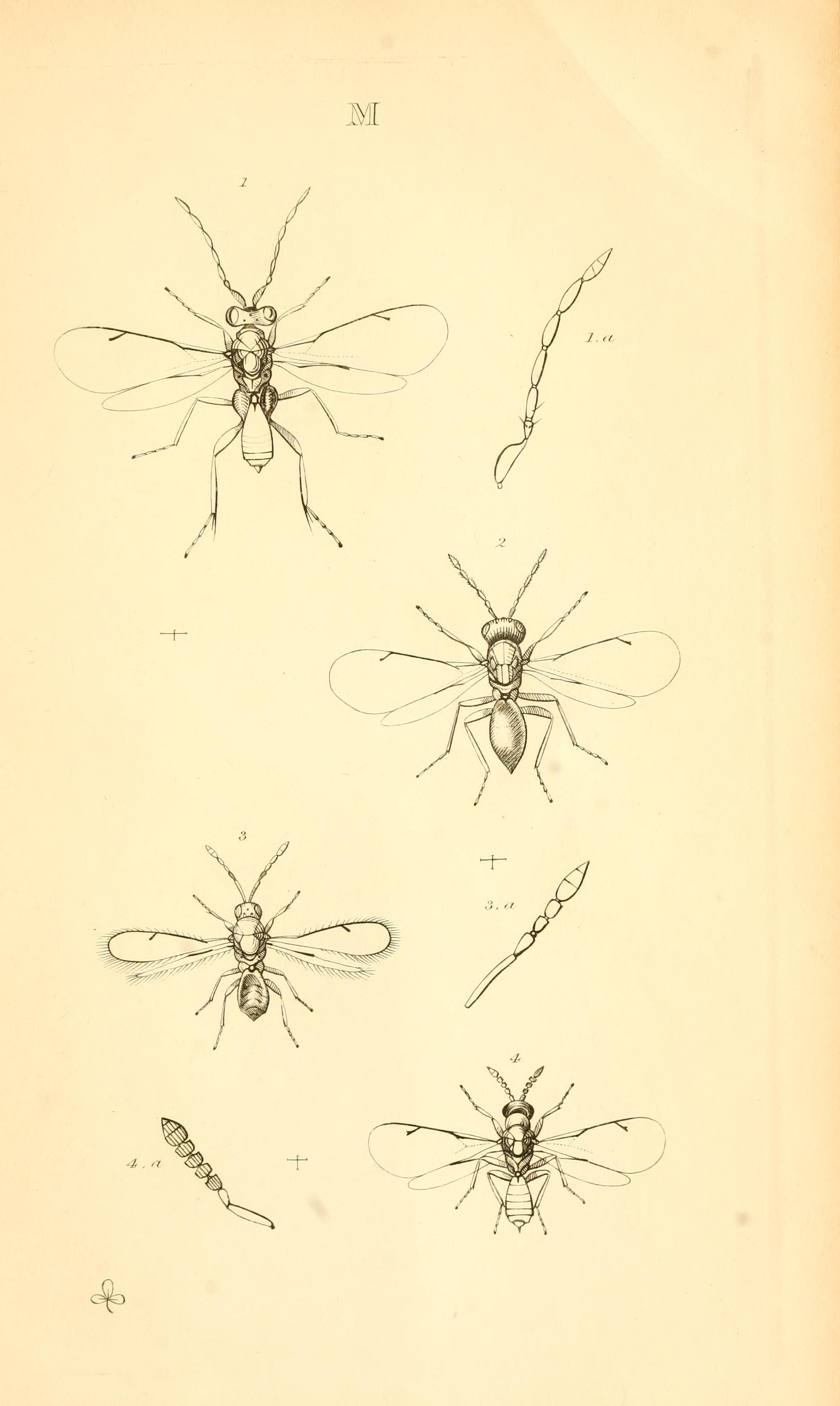

Scientific classification
- Kingdom: Animalia
- Phylum: Arthropoda
- Class: Insecta
- Order: Hymenoptera
- Family: Eulophidae
- Subfamily: Eulophinae
- Genus: Hyssopus; Girault, 1916

Type species
- Hyssopus thymus Girault, 1916

Species
- 17

= Hyssopus (wasp) =

Genus of wasps

Hyssopus is a genus of hymenopteran insects of the family Eulophidae. One species, Hyssopus aegyptiacus, is known to be an ectoparasite of Zeuzera pyrina caterpillars.
