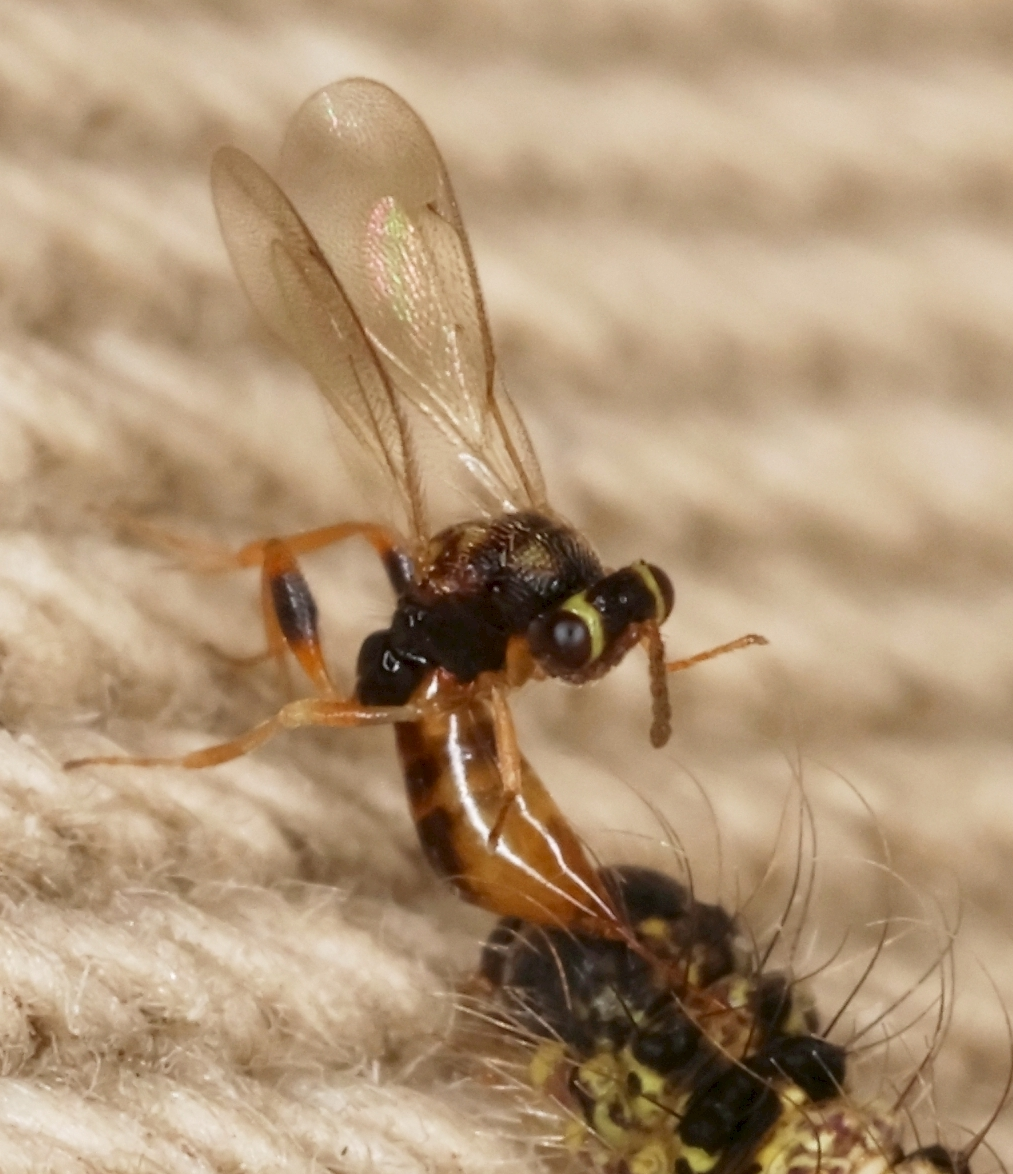
- Euplectromorpha variegata

Scientific classification
- Kingdom: Animalia
- Phylum: Arthropoda
- Clade: Pancrustacea
- Class: Insecta
- Order: Hymenoptera
- Family: Eulophidae
- Subfamily: Eulophinae
- Genus: Euplectromorpha; Girault, 1913

Type species
- Euplectromorpha unifasciata Girault, 1913

Species
- 20 species

= Euplectromorpha =

Genus of wasps

Euplectromorpha is a genus of hymenopteran insects of the family Eulophidae.
