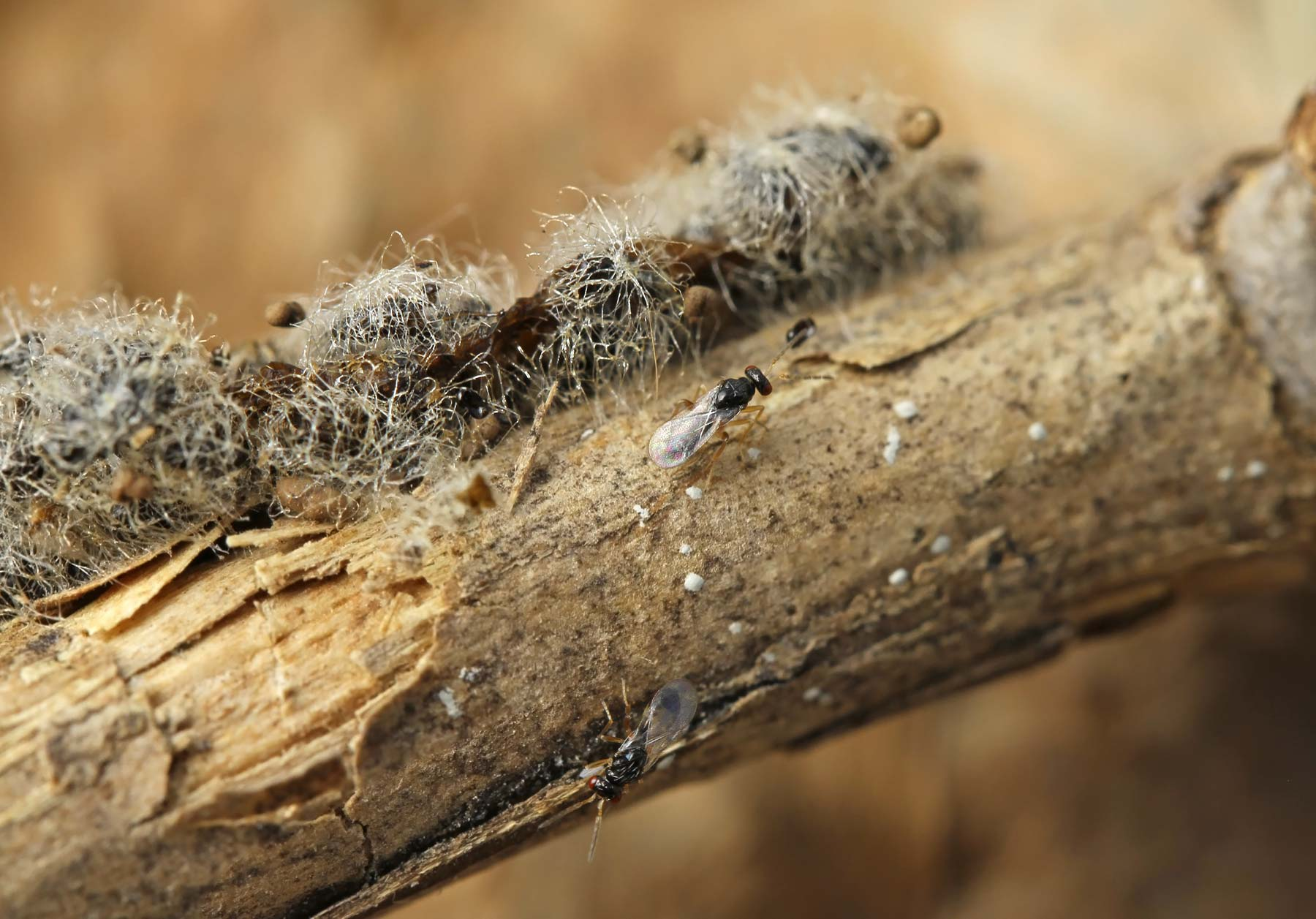
- Euplectrus adults emerging from the caterpillar of a Noctuid moth
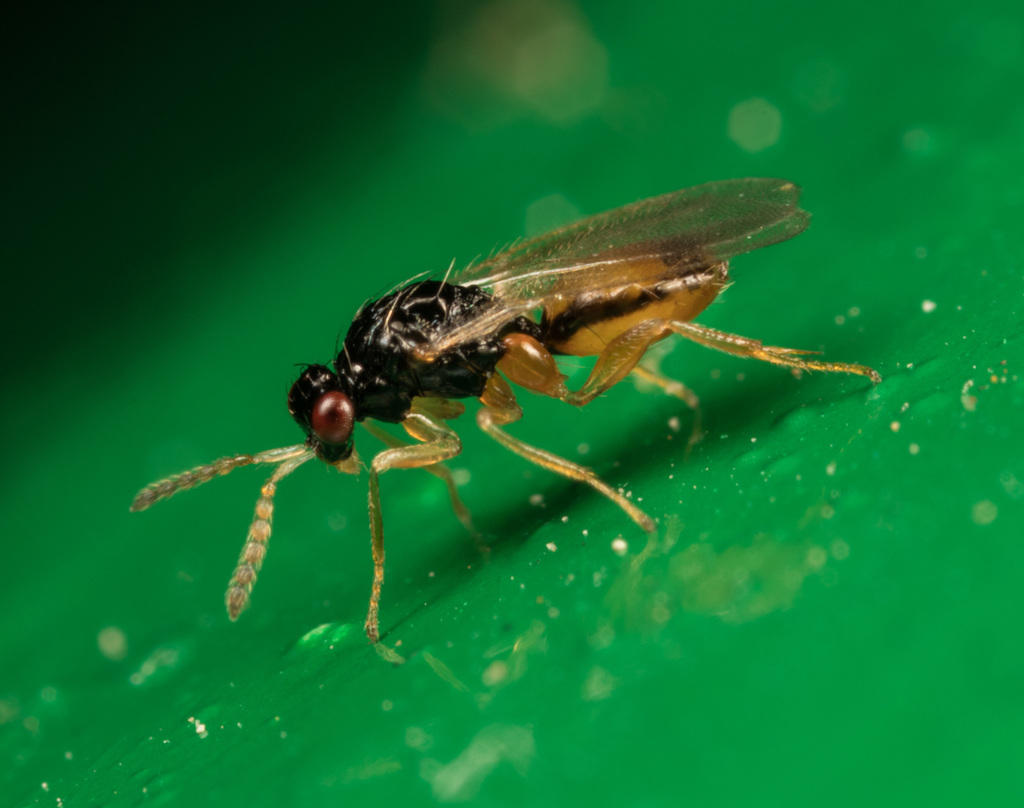
- Euplectrus sp. from Hong Kong

Scientific classification
- Kingdom: Animalia
- Phylum: Arthropoda
- Clade: Pancrustacea
- Class: Insecta
- Order: Hymenoptera
- Family: Eulophidae
- Subfamily: Eulophinae
- Genus: Euplectrus; Westwood, 1832

Type species
- Euplectrus maculiventris Westwood, 1832

Species
- 162 Species

= Euplectrus =

Genus of wasps

Euplectrus is a cosmopolitan genus of parasitoid wasps of the family Eulophidae. The wasps parasitize various caterpillars from many families of moths. The genus is distinct from other genera in the family but species within the genus are difficult to distinguish. Species in this genus are all ectoparasitoids but vary in their strategies for host exploitation.

== Distribution and hosts ==
Euplectrus wasps have been found on every continent besides Antarctica and in every biogeographic realm, as their hosts also have a cosmopolitan distribution.

Euplectrus parasitize caterpillars of many different moth families, including Erebidae, Euteliidae, Geometridae, Lasiocampidae, Noctuidae, Nolidae, Notodontidae, Sphingidae and Tortricidae. The larvae of all species of Euplectrus are greenish-yellow and are conspicuous on the host caterpillar's cuticle to which they are very firmly attached.

== Morphology and taxonomy ==
Euplectrus are easily distinguished from other members of the subfamily Eulophinae by three characteristics: long hind tibial spurs more than half as long as the hind tarsi, a scutellum without lateral grooves or rows of pits, and a propodeum with a single strong median carina. The genus is morphologically conservative, making species identification within the genus difficult.

== Ecology and behaviour ==
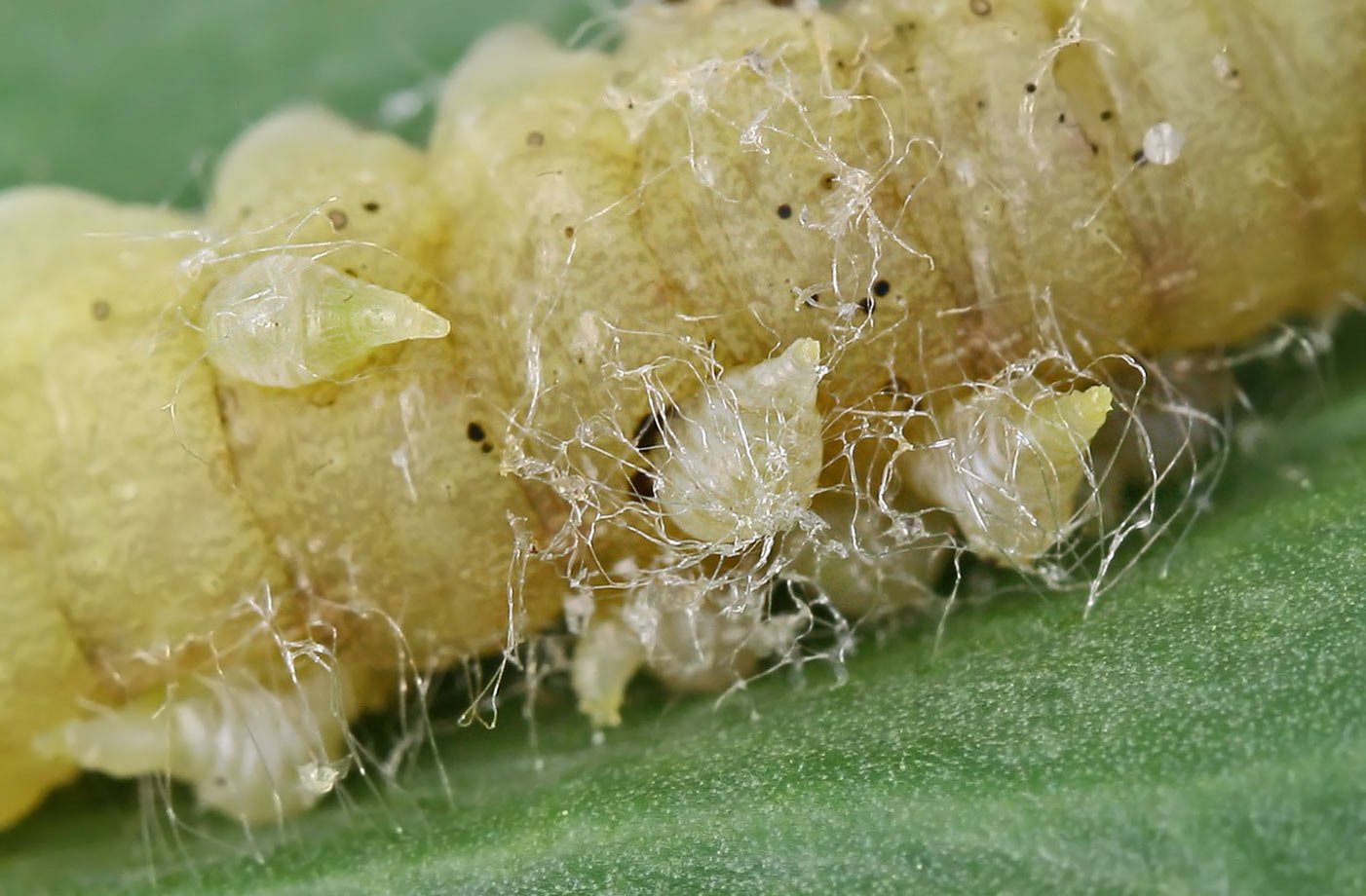
Euplectrus sp. on surface of host caterpillar

All species in the genus Euplectrus are caterpillar ectoparasitoids, attaching eggs to the surface of their hosts with a thin pedicel. During oviposition, the female wasps use their long tibial spurs to anchor themselves to the dorsum of the host caterpillar. Eggs are laid under the cuticle of the host, but above the hypodermis. Species are normally gregarious, laying between five and several hundred eggs per host caterpillar, although a few species lay a single egg on each host. Ovipositing females also inject venom in the host which prevents ecdysis (moulting), thus allowing the larvae and coccoons to remain attached to the host. Additionally, some species are idiobionts, with ovipositing females injecting a paralytic venom, while other species are koinobionts, allowing host larvae to continue feeding during parasitoid development.

After hatching, Euplectrus larvae remain attached to the host caterpillar, sucking on its haemolymph to feed. The larvae undergo 3-5 molts. Once larval growth is completed, larvae migrate from the dorsal side of the caterpillar to the ventral side of the caterpillar and spin coccoons to pupate. Some species spin communal cocoons around their host. The ability to spin cocoons is unique to this genus within the Eulophidae, with the larvae producing silk in modified malpighian tubules and exuding it from the anal opening.

Wasps in the genus normally take no longer than two weeks to go from oviposition to imago.

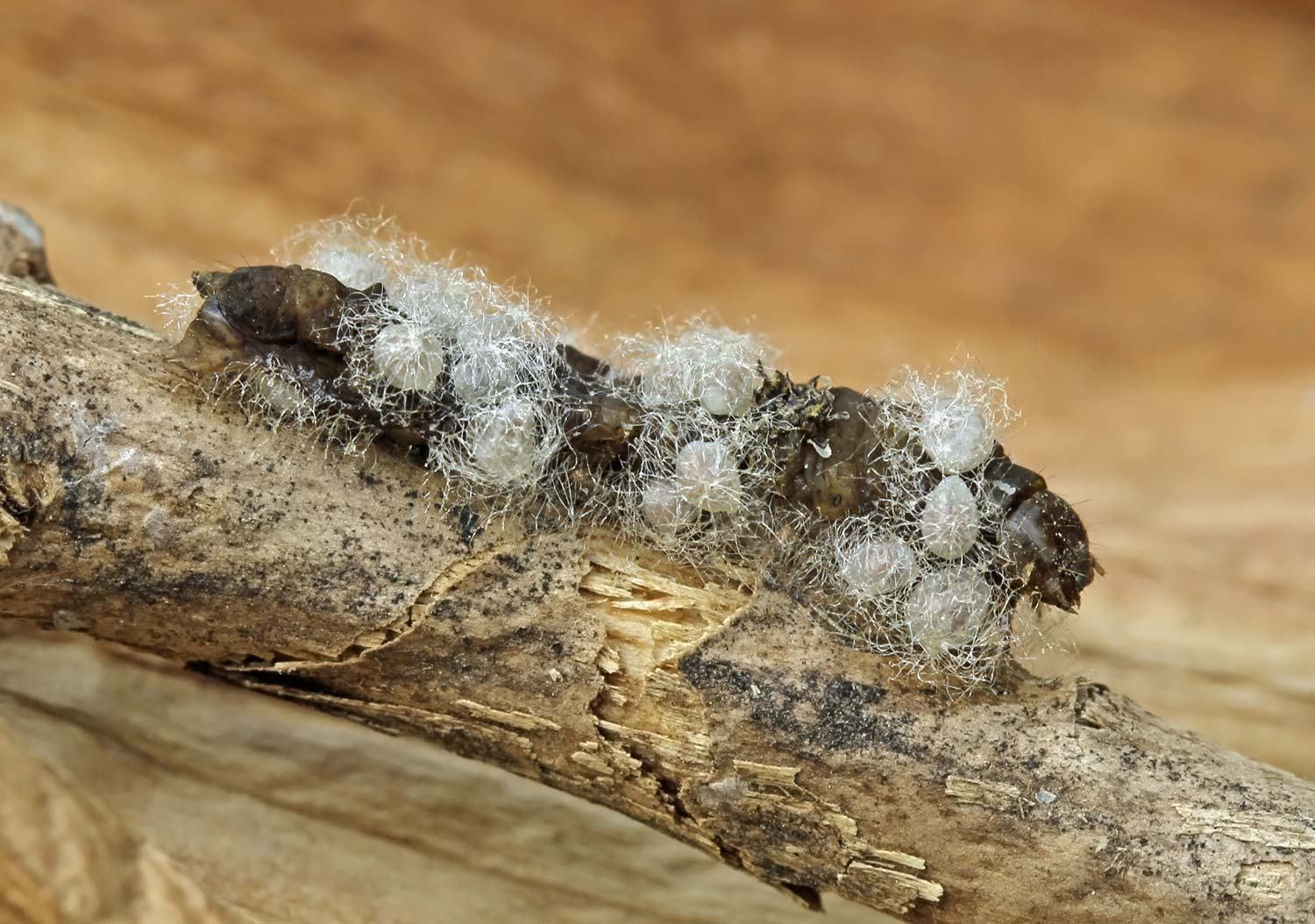
Euplectrus sp. cocoons on a Noctuidae caterpillar
