= Girault =

Girault is a surname, and may refer to:

In people:

- Alexandre Arsène Girault (1884–1941), American entomologist. Arsène Napoleon Girault's great-grandson.
- Charles Girault (1851–1932), French architect
- Hubert Girault (b. 1957), Swiss electrochemist
- Joseph-Philibert Girault de Prangey (1804–1892), French photographer and draughtsman
- Olivier Girault (b. 1973), French handball player
- Ron Girault (b. 1986), American football safety
- Vivette Girault (b. 1943), French mathematician

In botany:

- Rosa 'Alexandre Girault', a rose cultivar originating from Orléans, France and developed in 1907 by Barbier Frères & Compagnie. It is not named after the American entomologist. See List of rose cultivars named after people.
