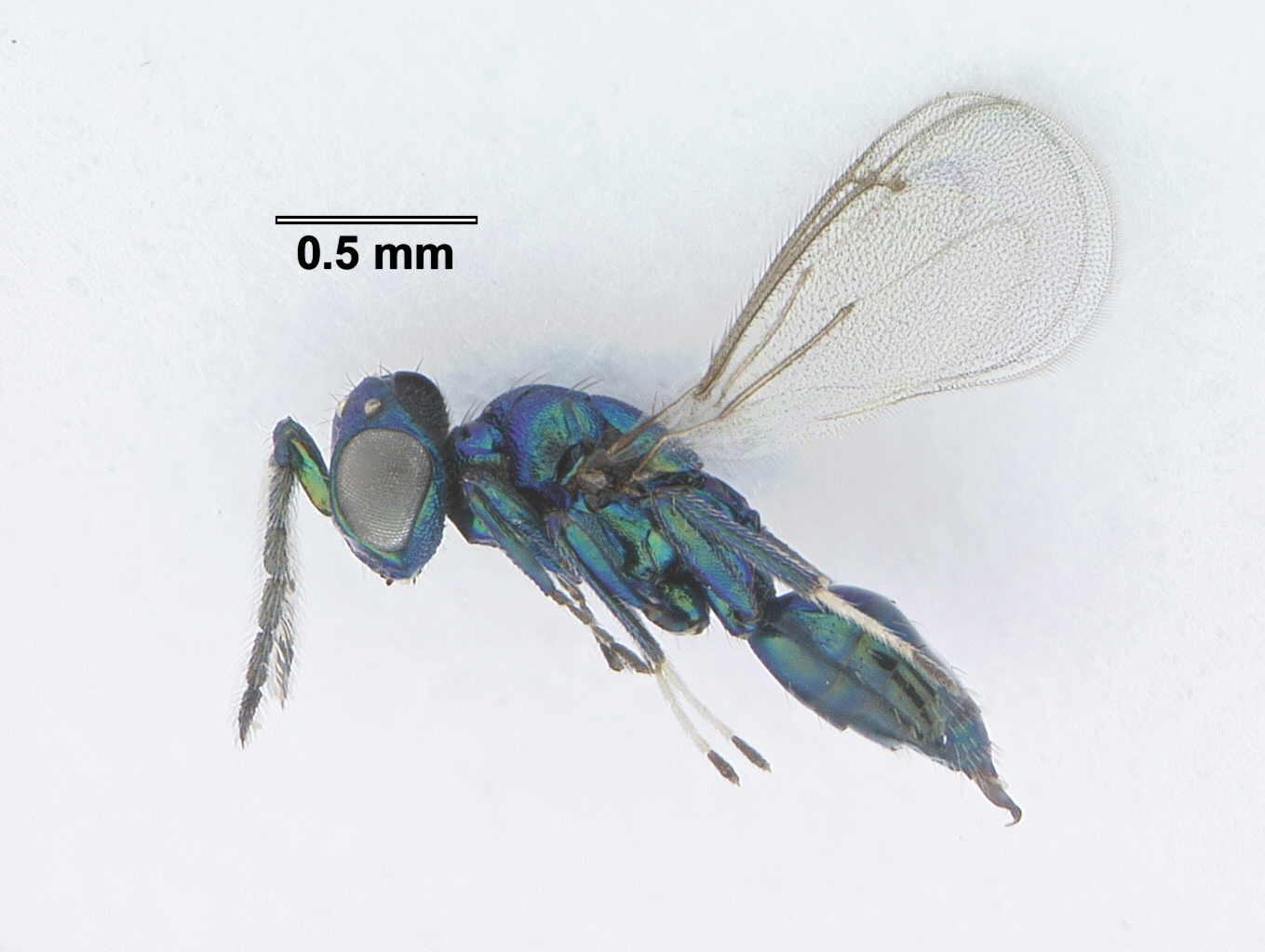
- Sympiesis sp.

Scientific classification
- Domain: Eukaryota
- Kingdom: Animalia
- Phylum: Arthropoda
- Class: Insecta
- Order: Hymenoptera
- Family: Eulophidae
- Subfamily: Eulophinae
- Genus: Sympiesis; Förster, 1856

Type species
- Sympiesis sericeicornis (Nees, 1834)

Species
- 100+ species

Synonyms
- Asympiesiella Girault, 1913; Diaulomella Girault, 1913; Diaulomorphella Girault, 1915; Eulophus (Cladosympiesis) Graham, 1959; Moroceras Erdös, 1954; Necremnomyia Girault, 1913; Opheliminus Girault, 1913; Pardiaulomella Girault, 1915; Pardiaulomyia Girault and Dodd, 1915; Pronecremnus Girault and Dodd, 1915; Pseudopheliminus Girault, 1913; Sympiezus Thomson, 1878; Teleogmus Förster, 1856

= Sympiesis =

Genus of wasps

Sympiesis is a genus of hymenopteran insects of the family Eulophidae.
