= Heinrich E. M. Schulz =

German entomologist

Heinrich E. M. Schulz (1859–1918) was a German entomologist.

Heinrich Schulz was an insect dealer in Hamburg. The dealership was named "Entomologisch Institut Hamburg" at Hamburg 22, Hamburgerstrasse 45. Another address for Schulz is Wohldorferstrass 10, Hamburg. In 1900 he purchased the remaining stock of Insekten-Händlers A. J. Speyer based in Hamburg-Altona
