= James Chamberlain Crawford =

American entomologist (1880–1950)

- Born: August 24, 1880; West Point, Cuming County, Nebraska, United States
- Died: December 20, 1950 (aged 70); Bethesda, Montgomery County, Maryland, United States
- Resting place: Glenwood Cemetery, Washington, District of Columbia, District of Columbia, United States
- Spouse: Emily Baker
- Children: Nancy Jane Dillon
- Scientific career
- Fields: Entomology

James Chamberlain Crawford (1880–1950) was an American entomologist.

== Biography ==
=== Life ===
Crawford was born on August 24, 1880, in West Point, Nebraska, to Judge James Chamberlain Crawford and Catherine Moore. He attended the University of Nebraska and graduated in 1904. He headed the biology department while there. He died on December 20, 1950, the same year that he retired.

=== Career ===
In 1904, Crawford joined the Bureau of Entomology as a research specialists, in the United States Department of Agriculture. He worked there from 1904 to 1919, after which he worked in a private business for four years, then joined the North Carolina Department of Agriculture. He left the North Carolina Department in 1930, and returned to the Bureau of Entomology and stayed there until his retirement.

In 1907, Crawford became an Assistant Curator in the Division of Insects, in the United States National Museum, and became an Associate Curator in 1911. He continued in this position until 1917, and specialized in the taxonomy of Hymenoptera.

From 1921 until 1930, he studied the Mexican bean beetle, in Black Mountain, North Carolina. He then returned to the Bureau of Entomology until his retirement.
