= Jean Risbec =

French zoologist

Jean Risbec (1895-1964) was a French zoologist who specialised in studying the insects and Molluscs of New Caledonia, as well as being a taxonomist of the parasitic Hymenoptera.

== Early years ==
Little is recorded about Risbec's early life but from 1921 to 1928 he was a teacher of Mathematics at the Lycée Lapeyrouse in Nouméa where he carried out studies of Nudibranchs in his spare time. As a result of these studies he was awarded a doctorate from the Sorbonne in Paris in 1928. One of his lesser known works was a short travel memoir which he wrote on the ship returning him to France from New Caledonia to collect his doctorate in 1928 Impressions de Nouvelle-Calédonie which was published in Bulletin de l'Agence Générale Coloniale Melun volume 21 on pages 399-479. This book captures the colonial life in Nouméa at a time before there were even sewers and roads and most travel was conducted on horseback.

== Career ==
He returned to New Caledonia as an agricultural entomologist and was resident in Nouméa until the mid 1930s, continuing to study the anatomy and biology of coastal molluscs and publishing over 30 papers. It was during this time that Risbec's first wife was killed in a horse riding accident in the New Hebrides. He soon left New Caledonia and despite his desire to return he was given an appointment in French Sudan and Senegal in 1937, remarrying in 1939. He never returned to New Caledonia. In Africa he studied the parasitic insects of crops and their parasites, especially the Chalcidoidea, returning to France in 1950. From 1950-1958 he published a total of 21 articles and books on the Hymenoptera of French West Africa and Madagascar, including the 500 pages of La faune entomologique des cultures au Sénégal et au Soudan français published by the Gouvernement général de l'A.O.F. in Dakar in 1950. Due to disagreements over taxonomy with another agricultural entomologist, Jean Ghesquière, this book could not be published in France and Risbec had to arrange publication in Africa. In total Risbec published over 60 articles and books. After his return to France in 1950 he was posted to London until 1960.

== Awards and honors ==
A number of species have been named in his honour including the nudibranch Rostanga risbeci as well as a number of other molluscs and insects. Efforts to use the name Risbecia for a genus of nudibranchs and a genus of Hymenoptera fell foul of the ICZN Rules and are regarded as junior homonyms.

== Death ==
He died in 1964 of a pulmonary oedema.
