= List of Torymus species =

These 363 species belong to Torymus, a genus of chalcid wasps in the family Torymidae.

== Torymus species ==
- Torymus absonus Narendran & Kumar, 2005^{c g}
- Torymus aceris Boucek, 1994^{c g}
- Torymus acrophilae Ruschka, 1921^{c g}
- Torymus advenus (Osten-Sacken, 1870)^{c g b}
- Torymus aea (Walker, 1843)^{c g}
- Torymus aeneoscapus (Huber, 1927)^{c g}
- Torymus aereus (Huber, 1927)^{c g}
- Torymus affinis (Fonscolombe, 1832)^{c g}
- Torymus aiolomorphi (Kamijo, 1964)^{g}
- Torymus alaskensis (Huber, 1927)^{c g}
- Torymus ambositrae (Risbec, 1955) (Madagascar)
- Torymus amurensis (Walker, 1874)^{c g}
- Torymus anastativorus Fahringer, 1944^{c g}
- Torymus angelicae (Walker, 1836)^{c g}
- Torymus anthobiae Ruschka, 1921^{c g}
- Torymus anthomyiae Ashmead, 1887^{c g}
- Torymus antiquus (Geoffroy, 1785)^{g}
- Torymus apiomyiae Boucek & Mihajlovic, 1986^{c g}
- Torymus approximatus Forster, 1841^{g}
- Torymus arcadius Graham & Gijswijt, 1998^{c g}
- Torymus arcella Graham & Gijswijt, 1998^{c g}
- Torymus arcticus (Thomson, 1876)^{c g}
- Torymus argei Boucek, 1994^{c g}
- Torymus armatus Boheman, 1834^{c g}
- Torymus arrogans Schrottky, 1907^{c g}
- Torymus artemisiae Mayr, 1874^{c g}
- Torymus arundinis (Walker, 1833)^{c g}
- Torymus asphondyliae Kieffer, 1910^{c g}
- Torymus associatus Forster, 1841^{g}
- Torymus asteridis (Huber, 1927)^{c g}
- Torymus atheatus Grissell, 1976^{c g}
- Torymus atriplicis (Huber, 1927)^{c g b}
- Torymus aucupariae (Rodzianko, 1908)^{c g}
- Torymus auratus (Muller, 1764)^{g}
- Torymus austriacus Graham, 1994^{c g}
- Torymus aztecus Cameron, 1905^{c g}
- Torymus azureus Boheman, 1834^{c g}
- Torymus baccharidis (Huber, 1927)^{c g}
- Torymus basalis (Walker, 1833)^{c g}
- Torymus baudysi Boucek, 1954^{c g}
- Torymus bedeguaris (Linnaeus, 1758)^{c g b}
- Torymus beneficus Yasumatsu & Kamijo, 1979^{c g}
- Torymus biarticulatus (Mayr, 1885)^{c g}
- Torymus bicoloratus (Huber, 1927)^{c g}
- Torymus bicolorus Xu & He, 2003^{c g}
- Torymus bifasciipennis (Gahan, 1936)^{c g}
- Torymus biorhizae (Ashmead, 1887)^{c g}
- Torymus boharti Grissell, 1976^{c g}
- Torymus boops Graham, 1994^{c g}
- Torymus borealis Thomson, 1876^{c g}
- Torymus bouceki Graham & Gijswijt, 1998^{c g}
- Torymus brachyurus Boheman, 1834^{c g}
- Torymus brevicoxa Zavada, 2001^{c g}
- Torymus breviscapus Graham & Gijswijt, 1998^{c g}
- Torymus brodiei (Ashmead, 1887)^{c g}
- Torymus calcaratus Nees, 1834^{c g}
- Torymus caledonicus Graham & Gijswijt, 1998^{c g}
- Torymus californicus (Ashmead, 1886)^{c g b} (oak gall chalcid)
- Torymus canariensis Hedqvist, 1977^{c g}
- Torymus capillaceus (Huber, 1927)^{c g}
- Torymus capitis (Huber, 1927)^{c g}
- Torymus capitonis Graham & Gijswijt, 1998^{c g}
- Torymus caudatulus Graham & Gijswijt, 1998^{c g}
- Torymus caudatus Boheman, 1834^{c g}
- Torymus cecidomyae (Walker, 1844)^{c g}
- Torymus centor Graham & Gijswijt, 1998^{c g}
- Torymus cerri (Mayr, 1874)^{c g}
- Torymus chapadae Ashmead, 1904^{c g}
- Torymus chaubattiensis Bhatnagar, 1952^{c g}
- Torymus chlorocopes Boheman, 1834^{c g}
- Torymus chloromerus (Walker, 1833)^{c g}
- Torymus chrysocephalus Boheman, 1834^{c g}
- Torymus chrysochlorus (Osten-Sacken, 1870)^{c g}
- Torymus cingulatus Nees, 1834^{c g}
- Torymus citripes (Huber, 1927)^{c g}
- Torymus coccineus (Huber, 1927)^{c g}
- Torymus coeruleus (Ashmead, 1881)^{c g}
- Torymus coloradensis (Huber, 1927)^{c g}
- Torymus condaliae Kieffer, 1910^{c g}
- Torymus confinis (Walker, 1833)^{c g}
- Torymus confluens Ratzeburg, 1852^{c g}
- Torymus contractus Dalman, 1820^{c g}
- Torymus contubernalis Boheman, 1834^{c g}
- Torymus corni Mayr, 1874^{c g}
- Torymus crassiceps Graham & Gijswijt, 1998^{c g}
- Torymus crassus (Breland, 1939)^{c g}
- Torymus cretaceus Graham & Gijswijt, 1998^{c g}
- Torymus cribratus Kieffer, 1910^{c g}
- Torymus cruentatus (Huber, 1927)^{c g}
- Torymus cultratus Graham & Gijswijt, 1998^{c g}
- Torymus cultriventris Ratzeburg, 1844^{c g}
- Torymus cupratus Boheman, 1834^{c g}
- Torymus cupreus (Spinola, 1808)^{c g}
- Torymus curticauda Graham & Gijswijt, 1998^{c g}
- Torymus curtisi Graham & Gijswijt, 1998^{c g}
- Torymus curvatulus Graham & Gijswijt, 1998^{c g}
- Torymus cyaneus Walker, 1847^{c g}
- Torymus cyniphidis (Linnaeus, 1758)^{g}
- Torymus cyprianus Graham & Gijswijt, 1998^{c g}
- Torymus dasyneurae (Huber, 1927)^{c g}
- Torymus dennoi Grissell, 1976^{c g}
- Torymus denticulatus (Breland, 1939)^{c g}
- Torymus diabolus Moser, 1965^{c g}
- Torymus difficilis Nees, 1834^{c g}
- Torymus dorycnicola (Müller, 1870)^{g}
- Torymus druparum Boheman, 1834^{c g}
- Torymus dryophantae (Ashmead, 1887)^{c g}
- Torymus dubiosus (Huber, 1927)^{c g}
- Torymus duplicatus (Huber, 1927)^{c g}
- Torymus durus (Osten-Sacken, 1870)^{c g}
- Torymus eadyi Graham & Gijswijt, 1998^{c g}
- Torymus ebrius (Osten-Sacken, 1870)^{c g}
- Torymus eglanteriae Mayr, 1874^{c g}
- Torymus elegantissimus (Ashmead, 1881)^{c g}
- Torymus epilobii Graham & Gijswijt, 1998^{c g}
- Torymus ermolenkoi Zerova & Seryogina, 2002^{c g}
- Torymus erucarum (Schrank, 1781)^{c g}
- Torymus eumelis (Walker, 1842)^{c g}
- Torymus eurytomae (Puzanowa-Malysheva, 1936)^{c g}
- Torymus evansi Grissell, 2004^{c g}
- Torymus ezomatsuanus Kamijo, 2004^{c g}
- Torymus fagi (Hoffmeyer, 1930)^{c g}
- Torymus fagineus Graham, 1994^{c g}
- Torymus fagopirum (Provancher, 1881)^{c g b}
- Torymus fastuosus Boheman, 1834^{c g}
- Torymus favardi Steffan, 1962^{c g}
- Torymus femoralis (Perez, 1895)^{g}
- Torymus ferrugineipes (Huber, 1927)^{c g}
- Torymus festivus Hobbs, 1950^{c g}
- Torymus filipendulae Graham & Gijswijt, 1998^{c g}
- Torymus fischeri Ruschka, 1921^{c g}
- Torymus flavicoxa (Osten-Sacken, 1870)^{c g b}
- Torymus flavigastris Matsuo, 2012^{g}
- Torymus flavipes (Walker, 1833)^{c g}
- Torymus flaviventris Ashmead, 1888^{c g}
- Torymus flavocinctus Kieffer, 1910^{c g}
- Torymus flavovariegatus Gijswijt, 1990^{c g}
- Torymus flavus (Goureau, 1851)^{g}
- Torymus floridensis Peck, 1951^{c g}
- Torymus formosus (Walker, 1833)^{c g}
- Torymus fractiosus Graham & Gijswijt, 1998^{c g}
- Torymus frankiei Grissell, 1973^{c g}
- Torymus frater Thomson, 1876^{c g}
- Torymus frumenti (Dumont-Courset, 1799)^{g}
- Torymus fujianensis Xu & He, 2003^{c g}
- Torymus fullawayi (Huber, 1927)^{c g b}
- Torymus fulvus (Huber, 1927)^{c g}
- Torymus fuscicornis (Walker, 1833)^{c g}
- Torymus fuscipes Boheman, 1834^{c g}
- Torymus gahani (Huber, 1927)^{c g}
- Torymus galeobdolonis Graham & Gijswijt, 1998^{c g}
- Torymus galii Boheman, 1834^{c g}
- Torymus gansuensis Lin & Xu, 2005^{c g}
- Torymus genisticola Ruschka, 1921^{c g}
- Torymus geranii (Walker, 1833)^{c g}
- Torymus giraudianus (Hoffmeyer, 1930)^{c g}
- Torymus globiceps (Retzius, 1783)^{c g}
- Torymus gloriosus Graham & Gijswijt, 1998^{c g}
- Torymus gracilior Graham, 1994^{c g}
- Torymus grahami Boucek, 1994^{c g}
- Torymus guyanaus Cameron, 1913^{c g}
- Torymus hainesi Ashmead, 1893^{c g}
- Torymus halimi Graham & Gijswijt, 1998^{c g}
- Torymus hederae (Walker, 1833)^{c g}
- Torymus helianthi Brodie, 1894^{c g}
- Torymus helveticus Graham & Gijswijt, 1998^{c g}
- Torymus heterobiae Graham & Gijswijt, 1998^{c g}
- Torymus heyeri Wachtl, 1883^{c g}
- Torymus himachalicus Narendran & Sureshan, 2005^{c g}
- Torymus hircinus Ashmead, 1894^{c g}
- Torymus hirsutus (Huber, 1927)^{c g}
- Torymus hobbsi Grissell, 2004^{c g}
- Torymus holcaspoideus (Ashmead, 1904)^{c g}
- Torymus hornigi Ruschka, 1921^{c g}
- Torymus huberi (Hoffmeyer, 1929)^{c g}
- Torymus hylesini Graham, 1994^{c g}
- Torymus iacchos Zavada, 2001^{c g}
- Torymus igniceps Mayr, 1874^{c g}
- Torymus impar Rondani, 1877^{c g}
- Torymus imperatrix Graham & Gijswijt, 1998^{c g}
- Torymus indicus (Ahmad, 1946)^{c g}
- Torymus interruptus Gijswijt, 2000^{c g}
- Torymus inulae Wachtl, 1884^{c g}
- Torymus iraklii Zerova & Seryogina, 2002^{c g}
- Torymus isajevi Zerova & Dolgin, 1986^{c g}
- Torymus itoi Matsuo^{g}
- Torymus janetiellae Graham & Gijswijt, 1998^{c g}
- Torymus josefi Boucek, 1996^{c g}
- Torymus josephinae Boucek, 1988^{c g}
- Torymus juniperi (Linnaeus, 1758)^{c g}
- Torymus kaltenbachi Forster, 1840^{g}
- Torymus kiefferi (Hoffmeyer, 1929)^{c g}
- Torymus kinseyi (Huber, 1927)^{c g}
- Torymus koebelei (Huber, 1927)^{c g b}
- Torymus kononovae (Zerova & Seregina, 1991)^{c g}
- Torymus koreanus Kamijo, 1982^{c g}
- Torymus kovaci Narendran & Girish Kumar, 2005^{c g}
- Torymus laetus (Walker, 1833)^{c g}
- Torymus lampros Graham, 1994^{c g}
- Torymus lapsanae (Hoffmeyer, 1930)^{c g}
- Torymus laricis Boucek, 1994^{c g}
- Torymus larreae Grissell, 1976^{c g}
- Torymus lathyri Graham & Gijswijt, 1998^{c g}
- Torymus latialatus Lin & Xu, 2005^{c g}
- Torymus lini Mayr, 1874^{c g}
- Torymus lissus (Walker, 1843)^{c g}
- Torymus lividus (Ashmead, 1885)^{c g}
- Torymus longicalcar Graham, 1994^{c g}
- Torymus longicauda (Provancher, 1883)^{c g}
- Torymus longior Brodie, 1894^{c g b}
- Torymus longiscapus Grissell, 1976^{c g}
- Torymus longistigmus (Huber, 1927)^{c g}
- Torymus loranthi (Cameron, 1913)^{c g}
- Torymus luridus Zavada, 2001^{c g}
- Torymus lyciicola Kieffer, 1910^{c g}
- Torymus lythri Boucek, 1994^{c g}
- Torymus macrurus (Forster, 1859)^{g}
- Torymus maculatus Lin & Xu, 2005^{c g}
- Torymus maculipennis (Cameron, 1884)^{c g}
- Torymus magnificus (Osten-Sacken, 1870)^{c g}
- Torymus mandrakensis (Risbec, 1956)^{c g}
- Torymus mediocris (Walker, 1874)^{c g}
- Torymus mellipes (Huber, 1927)^{c g}
- Torymus memnonius Grissell, 1973^{c g}
- Torymus mendocinus Kieffer, 1910^{c g}
- Torymus mexicanus Ashmead, 1899^{c g}
- Torymus microcerus (Walker, 1833)^{c g}
- Torymus microstigma (Walker, 1833)^{c g}
- Torymus micrurus Boucek, 1994^{c g}
- Torymus millefolii Ruschka, 1921^{c g}
- Torymus minutus Forster, 1840^{g}
- Torymus missouriensis (Huber, 1927)^{c g}
- Torymus monticola Graham & Gijswijt, 1998^{c g}
- Torymus montserrati Crawford, 1911^{c g}
- Torymus multicolor (Huber, 1927)^{c g}
- Torymus myrtacearum (Costa Lima, 1916)^{c g}
- Torymus narvikensis Graham, 1994^{c g}
- Torymus nebulosus Askew, 2001^{c g}
- Torymus neepalensis Narendran, 1994^{c g}
- Torymus nemorum Boucek, 1994^{c g}
- Torymus neuroterus Ashmead, 1887^{c g}
- Torymus nigritarsus (Walker, 1833)^{c g}
- Torymus nitidulus (Walker, 1833)^{c g}
- Torymus nobilis Boheman, 1834^{c g}
- Torymus nonacris (Walker, 1842)^{c g}
- Torymus notatus (Walker, 1833)^{c g}
- Torymus novitzkyi Graham, 1994^{c g}
- Torymus nubilus (Breland, 1939)^{c g}
- Torymus nudus (Breland, 1939)^{c g}
- Torymus obscurus (Breland, 1939)^{c g}
- Torymus occidentalis (Huber, 1927)^{c g}
- Torymus ochreatus Say, 1836^{c g}
- Torymus oreiplanus Kieffer, 1910^{c g}
- Torymus orientalis (Masi, 1926)^{g}
- Torymus orissaensis (Mani, 1936)^{c g}
- Torymus orobi Mayr, 1874^{c g}
- Torymus osborni (Huber, 1927)^{c g}
- Torymus oviperditor (Gahan, 1927)^{c g}
- Torymus pachypsyllae (Ashmead, 1888)^{c g}
- Torymus pallidipes Ashmead, 1894^{c g}
- Torymus paludum Graham & Gijswijt, 1998^{c g}
- Torymus paraguayensis (Girault, 1913)^{c g}
- Torymus partitus Graham & Gijswijt, 1998^{c g}
- Torymus pascuorum Boucek, 1994^{c g}
- Torymus pastinacae Graham & Gijswijt, 1998^{c g}
- Torymus pavidus Say, 1836^{c g}
- Torymus perplexus (Huber, 1927)^{c g}
- Torymus persicariae Mayr, 1874^{c g}
- Torymus persimilis Ashmead, 1894^{c g}
- Torymus philippii (Hoffmeyer, 1929)^{c g}
- Torymus phillyreae Ruschka, 1921^{c g}
- Torymus poae (Hoffmeyer, 1930)^{c g}
- Torymus potamius Grissell, 1976^{c g}
- Torymus pretiosus (Walker, 1833)^{c g}
- Torymus problematicus Graham & Gijswijt, 1998^{c g}
- Torymus prosopidis Kieffer, 1910^{c g}
- Torymus prunicola (Huber, 1927)^{c g}
- Torymus pseudotsugae Hobbs, 2004^{c g}
- Torymus pulchellus Thomson, 1876^{c g}
- Torymus punctifrons (Ashmead, 1894)^{c g}
- Torymus purpurascens (Fabricius, 1798)^{c g}
- Torymus purpureae Graham & Gijswijt, 1998^{c g}
- Torymus purpureomaculata (Cameron, 1904)^{c g}
- Torymus putoniellae Graham & Gijswijt, 1998^{c g}
- Torymus pygmaeus Mayr, 1874^{c g}
- Torymus quadriceps Graham & Gijswijt, 1998^{c g}
- Torymus quercinus Boheman, 1834^{c g}
- Torymus racemariae ^{b}
- Torymus ramicola Ruschka, 1921^{c g}
- Torymus ranomafanensis (Risbec, 1956) (Madagascar)
- Torymus regalis (Walker, 1833)^{c g}
- Torymus resinanae Ratzeburg, 1852^{c g}
- Torymus rhamni Boucek, 1994^{c g}
- Torymus rhoditidis (Huber, 1927)^{c g}
- Torymus ringofuschi Kamijo, 1979^{c g}
- Torymus roboris (Walker, 1833)^{c g}
- Torymus rosariae Graham & Gijswijt, 1998^{c g}
- Torymus rubi (Schrank, 1781)^{c g}
- Torymus rubigasterus Xu & He, 2003^{c g}
- Torymus rudbeckiae Ashmead, 1890^{c g}
- Torymus rufipes (Walker, 1834)^{c g}
- Torymus rugglesi Milliron, 1959^{c g b}
- Torymus rugosipunctatus Ashmead, 1894^{c g}
- Torymus ruschkai (Hoffmeyer, 1929)^{c g}
- Torymus salicis Graham, 1994^{c g}
- Torymus sapporoensis Ashmead, 1904^{c g}
- Torymus sarothamni Kieffer, 1899^{c g}
- Torymus scalaris (Huber, 1927)^{c g}
- Torymus scandicus Graham & Gijswijt, 1998^{c g}
- Torymus scaposus (Thomson, 1876)^{c g}
- Torymus schizothecae Ruschka, 1921^{c g}
- Torymus scutellaris (Walker, 1833)^{c g}
- Torymus seminum (Hoffmeyer, 1929)^{c g}
- Torymus sharmai Sureshan & Narendran, 2002^{c g}
- Torymus silenus Zavada, 2001^{c g}
- Torymus sinensis Kamijo, 1982^{c g}
- Torymus smithi Ashmead, 1904^{c g}
- Torymus socius Mayr, 1874^{c g}
- Torymus solidaginis (Huber, 1927)^{c g}
- Torymus solitarius (Osten-Sacken, 1870)^{c g b}
- Torymus spaici Boucek, 1994^{c g}
- Torymus speciosus Boheman, 1834^{c g}
- Torymus sphaerocephalus Graham & Gijswijt, 1998^{g}
- Torymus spherocephalus de Vere Graham & Gijswit, 1998^{g}
- Torymus spilopterus Boheman, 1834^{c g}
- Torymus splendidulus Dalla Torre, 1898^{c g}
- Torymus stenus Graham, 1994^{c g}
- Torymus stom Narendran & Sudheer, 2005^{c g}
- Torymus strenuus (Walker, 1871)^{c g}
- Torymus subcalifornicus Grissell, 1976^{c g}
- Torymus subnudus Boucek, 1978^{c g}
- Torymus sulcatus (Huber, 1927)^{c g}
- Torymus superbus Kieffer, 1910^{c g}
- Torymus sylvicola Ashmead, 1904^{c g}
- Torymus tanaceticola Ruschka, 1921^{c g}
- Torymus tatianae Zavada, 2001^{c g}
- Torymus terentianus Zavada, 2001^{c g}
- Torymus texanus (Hoffmeyer, 1930)^{c g}
- Torymus thalassinus (Crosby, 1908)^{c g}
- Torymus theon (Walker, 1843)^{c g}
- Torymus thompsoni Fyles, 1904^{c g}
- Torymus thoracicus (Ashmead, 1904)^{c g}
- Torymus thymi Ruschka, 1921^{c g}
- Torymus tipulariarum Zetterstedt, 1838^{c g}
- Torymus triangularis Thomson, 1876^{c g}
- Torymus tsugae (Yano, 1918)^{c g}
- Torymus tubicola (Osten-Sacken, 1870)^{c g b}
- Torymus ulmariae Ruschka, 1921^{c g}
- Torymus umbilicatus (Gahan, 1919)^{c g b}
- Torymus valerii Graham & Gijswijt, 1998^{c g}
- Torymus vallisnierii Cameron, 1901^{c g}
- Torymus varians (Walker)^{i c g}
- Torymus ventralis (Fonscolombe, 1832)^{c g}
- Torymus verbasci Ruschka, 1921^{c g}
- Torymus veronicae Ruschka, 1921^{c g}
- Torymus vesiculi Moser, 1956^{c g}
- Torymus violae (Hoffmeyer, 1944)^{c g}
- Torymus virescens (De Stefani, 1908)^{g}
- Torymus wachtliellae Graham & Gijswijt, 1998^{c g}
- Torymus warreni (Cockerell, 1911)^{c g}
- Torymus xanthopus (Schulz, 1906)^{c g}
- Torymus zabriskii ^{b}
- Torymus zhejiangensis Lin & Xu, 2005^{c g}

Data sources: i = ITIS, c = Catalogue of Life, g = GBIF, b = Bugguide.net
