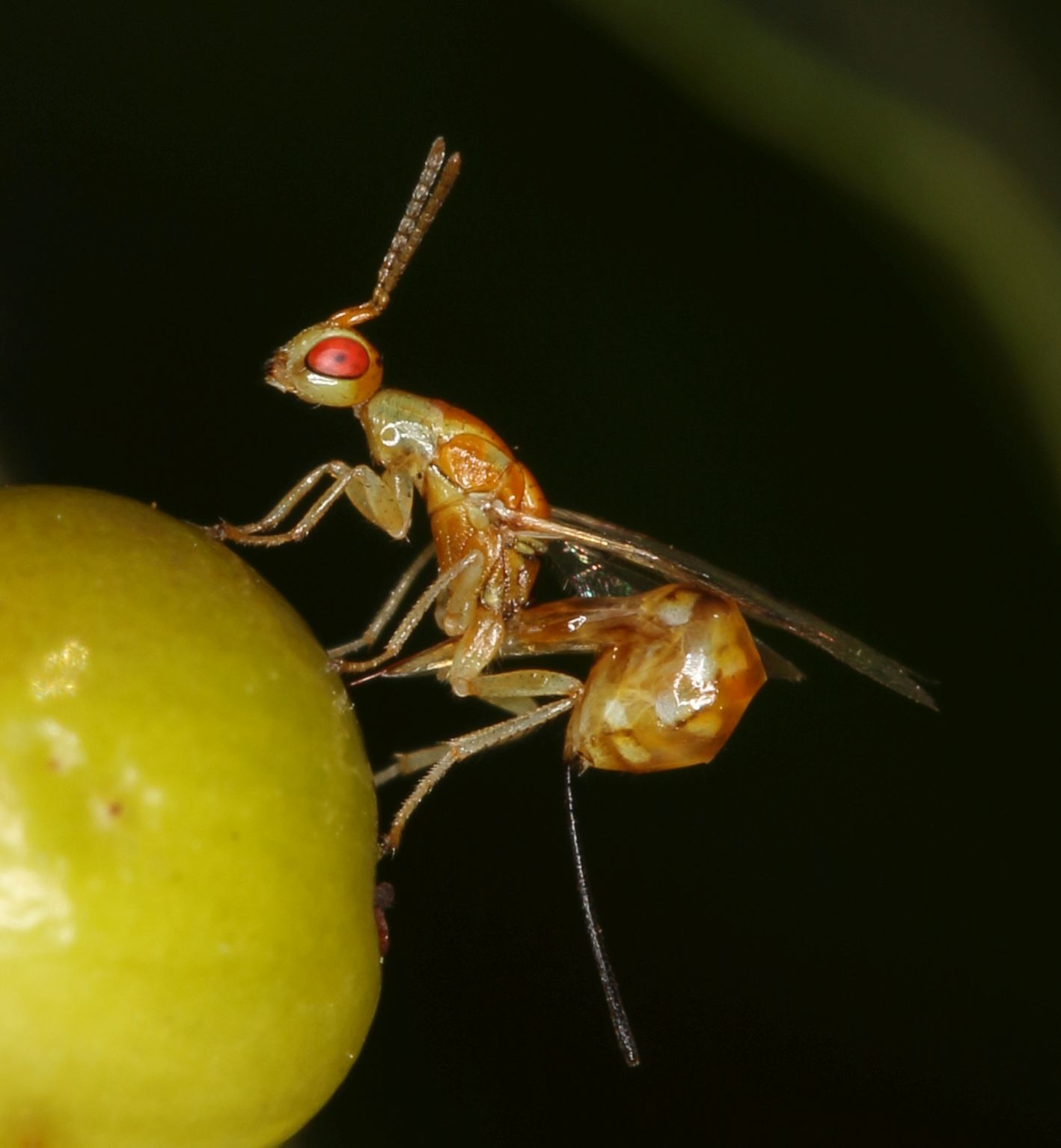
- A female Megastigmus transvaalensis ovipositing in the fruit of Searsia dentata in South Africa
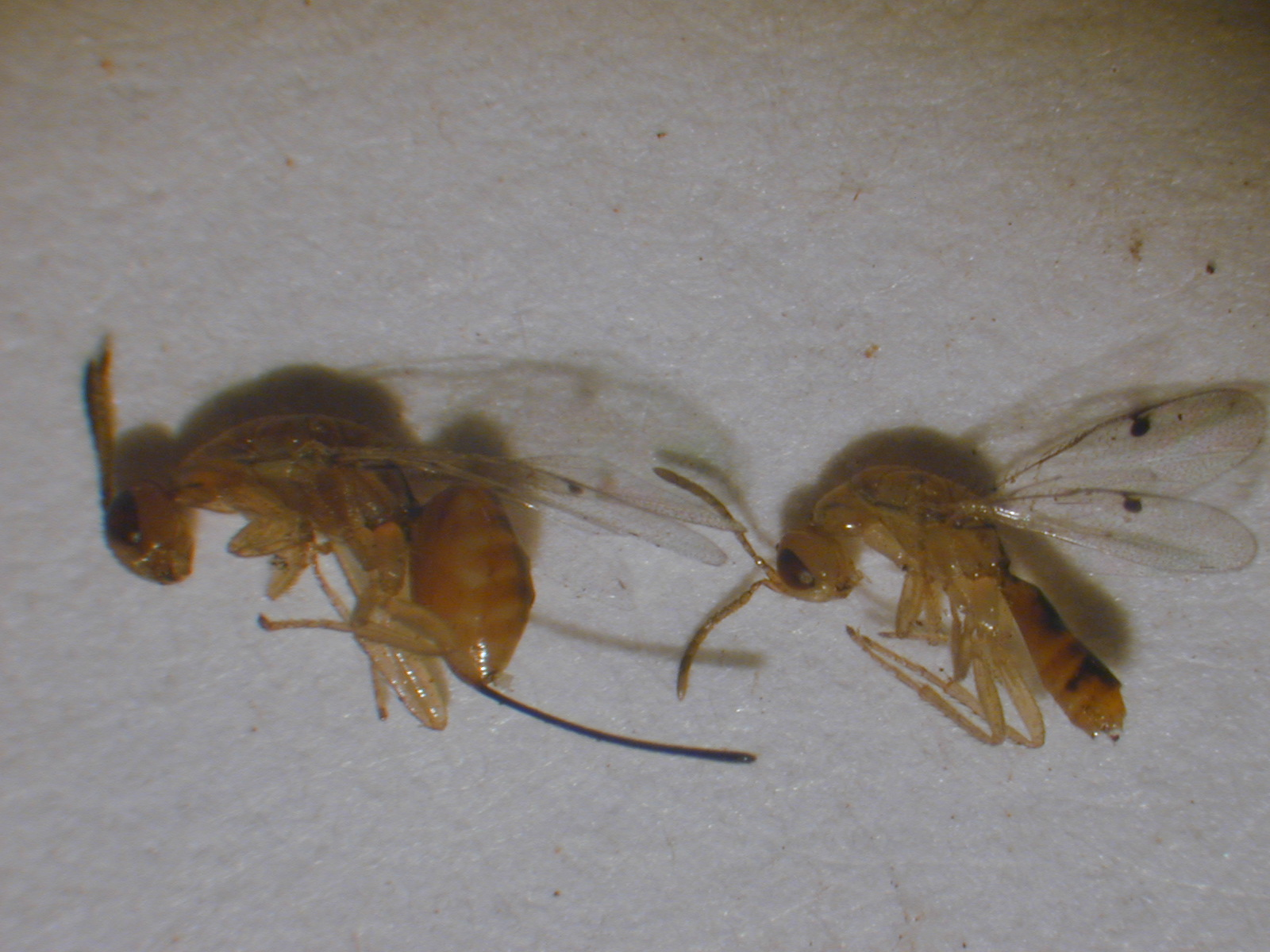
- Megastigmus transvaalensis

Scientific classification
- Kingdom: Animalia
- Phylum: Arthropoda
- Clade: Pancrustacea
- Class: Insecta
- Order: Hymenoptera
- Family: Megastigmidae
- Genus: Megastigmus
- Species: M. transvaalensis

Binomial name
- Megastigmus transvaalensis (Hussey 1956)

= Megastigmus transvaalensis =

Species of wasp

Megastigmus transvaalensis is a species of small wasp belonging to the family Megastigmidae. It is native to South Africa but has since spread as an invasive species in Mexico, Brazil and Chile. The adults have a yellowish-brown color. The males of the species grow to a length of 2.3-2.9 mm and females grow from 3.1 to 3.4 mm in length. The ovipositor reaches about half the length of the body.

== Ecology ==
In Africa, it parasitizes drupes of the genus Rhus with examples of affected species being Rhus angustifolia and Rhus laevigata. In South America, it parasitizes members of the genus Schinus, specifically Schinus terebinthifolius, Schinus molle and Schinus polygamus. In Chile, their host is the genus Cabrera.

It has been proposed that M. transvaalensis can be used as a biological control agent for invasive populations of Schinus molle. However this species does have the potential to spread throughout Brazil and pose a threat to the natural regeneration of Schinus terebinthifolius. This was first seen in 2012 in the Sorocaba municipality, São Paulo State, Brazil and the species was identified as M. transvaalensis by Dr. Paul Hanson.
