= Torymus druparum =

Scientific classification
- Kingdom: Animalia
- Phylum: Arthropoda
- Class: Insecta
- Order: Hymenoptera
- Family: Torymidae
- Genus: Torymus
- Species: T. druparum

Binomial name
- Torymus druparum (Boheman, 1834)

Species of parasitoid wasp

Torymus druparum, the apple-seed chalcid, is a species of parasitoid wasp. The species is found in Eastern Europe, Western Europe, Central Asia, and North America.

== Description ==
Torymus druparum has a bronze-green body and transparent wings. The primary part of antennae and legs (with the exception of the coxa) are a reddish yellow. The tarsi are a light yellow. The hindthighs have a metallic shine. Females are 3.5–4mm long, while males are 3–3.4mm long. The ovipositor is approximately 1.5 of the body length. The female-to-male ratio of the species is approximately 3-to-1.

== Behaviour ==
Torymus druparum is a common parasitoid on seeds of apples, pears, Crataegus, and Sorbus. Within the apples, the eggs are inserted into the young seed through the micropyle when the apple is still small, with the larvae feeding on the kernel. T. druparum usually spends two or three winters in the larval state, though rarely emerging during the first spring as well.

Within the human-cultivated apples, T. druparum is a frequent pest on Lady apples and crab apples due to their smaller size allowing easier penetration with the ovipositor. The only visible effect of infestation is caused by the puncturing of the skin by the ovipositor, appearing as a minute scar in a small dimple after a few days. In most cases, the fruit is able to outgrow the injury, however in rarer cases of sparse fruit or repeated puncturing, this can cause permanent dimpling and discoloured streaks on the flesh. It is also common to mistake infestating by other species (such as Lygidea mendax or Heterocordylus malinus) as being caused by T. druparum. Only the Lady apple is subject to heavy infestation: in a 1914 study, Cyrus R. Crosby found that two thirds of inspected lady apples were infested with the wasp. In contrast, in orchards containing Grimes Golden only a quarter of apples have been discovered infested, while only a single apple each of Ben Davis and Missouri have been discovered infested.
