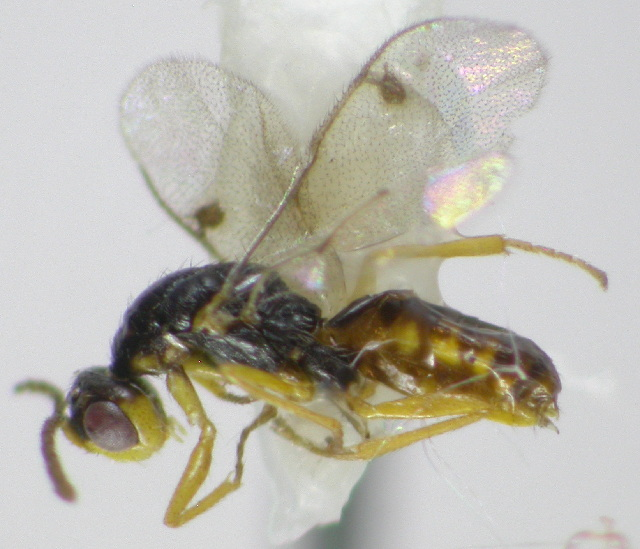

Scientific classification
- Kingdom: Animalia
- Phylum: Arthropoda
- Class: Insecta
- Order: Hymenoptera
- Family: Megastigmidae
- Genus: Megastigmus
- Species: M. atedius

Binomial name
- Megastigmus atedius Walker, 1851

= Megastigmus atedius =

Species of wasp

Megastigmus atedius (spruce seed chalcid) is a species of minute wasp that feeds on white spruce seed and cones. The damage it causes is largely undetected because the larvae complete their development hidden inside the seeds, which reveal no external indication of this. Although species of Megastigmus are said to be host-specific, the spruce seed chalcid found near Fairbanks, Alaska, was identified by E.H. Holsten and others in 1980 as M. piceae, while A.H. Rose and O.H. Lindquist applied the name Megastigmus piceae, but gave the authority as Rohwer.
