= Odopoia =

Scientific classification
- Kingdom: Animalia
- Phylum: Arthropoda
- Class: Insecta
- Order: Hymenoptera
- Family: Torymidae
- Subfamily: Toryminae
- Genus: Odopoia; Walker, 1871

Genus of wasps

Odopoia is a genus of wasps in the family Torymidae, containing the following species:

- Odopoia atra Walker, 1871
- Odopoia dentatinota (Girault, 1925)
- Odopoia jianfengica Xiao & Jiao, 2012
- Odopoia josephinae Boucek, 1988
- Odopoia philippiae (Risbec, 1952)
- Odopoia reticulata Sureshan, 2007
- Odopoia wenchangica Xiao & Hu, 2012
