= Torymus pachypsyllae =

Scientific classification
- Domain: Eukaryota
- Kingdom: Animalia
- Phylum: Arthropoda
- Class: Insecta
- Order: Hymenoptera
- Family: Torymidae
- Genus: Torymus
- Species: T. pachypsyllae

Binomial name
- Torymus pachypsyllae (Ashmead, 1888)

Species of wasp

Torymus pachypsyllae is a species of Torymid wasp found in North America. It primarily attacks the psyllid Pachypsylla celtidismamma, although it is known to attack other related species in the genus Pachypsylla.
