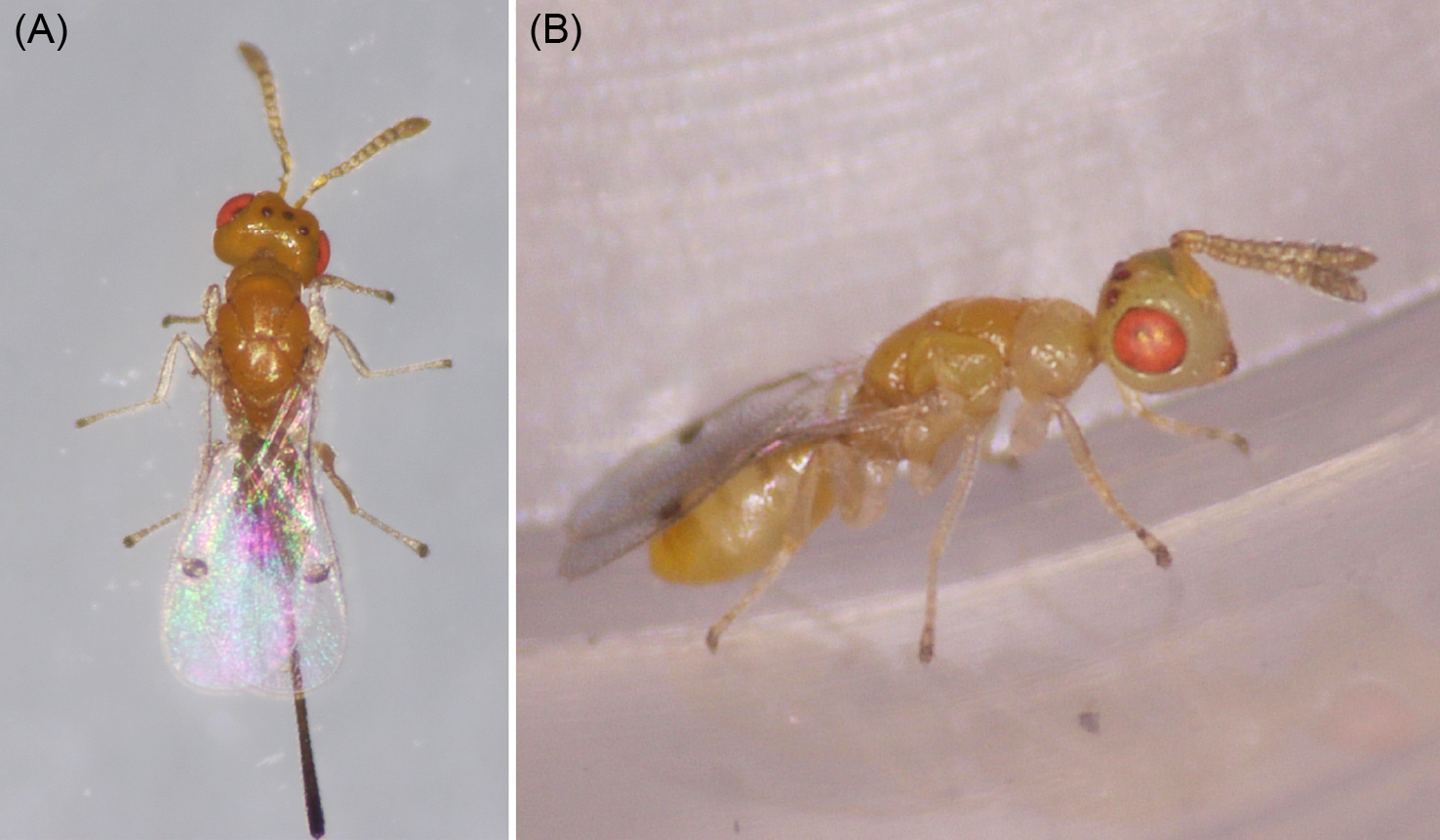
- Megastigmus viggianii
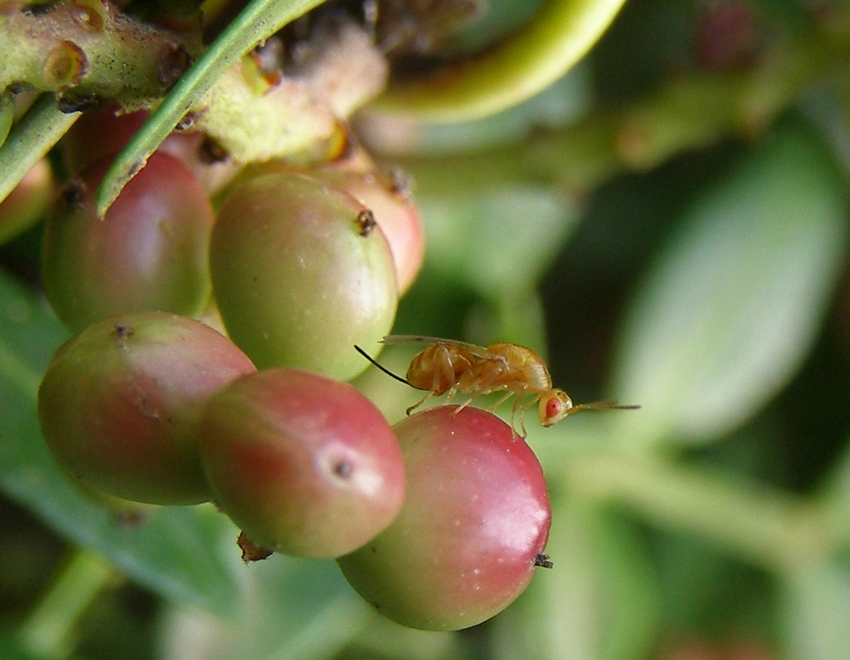
- Megastigmus pistaciae

Scientific classification
- Kingdom: Animalia
- Phylum: Arthropoda
- Clade: Pancrustacea
- Class: Insecta
- Order: Hymenoptera
- Family: Megastigmidae
- Genus: Megastigmus; Dalman, 1820

Species
- (see article text)

Synonyms
- Cycloneura Ashmead, 1904; Cycloneuron Dahlbom, 1857; Cycloneurum Schulz, 1906; Eumegastigmus Hussey, 1956; Megalostigmus Schulz, 1906; Trogocarpus Rondani, 1877; Xanthosomoides Girault, 1913

= Megastigmus =

Genus of wasps

Megastigmus is a large genus of minute wasps that belongs to the family Megastigmidae. Many species undergo larval development within the seeds of trees and shrubs. They have a global distribution with the most species being found in the Palearctic, Australian, and Nearctic regions. Their wings have relatively large black spots located towards to middle The ovipositors in females are long.

The genus name “Megastigmus” is Greek with “mega” meaning large and “stigmus” meaning mark or spot.

== Distribution ==
Members of this genus are globally distributed although some regions have greater number of species. The Palearctic, Australian, and Nearctic regions have the most species while the subtropical and tropical regions have few discovered. The Afrotropical region has around 7 described species.

== Ecology ==
This genus is every diverse in their feeding habits with some being strictly phytophagous while others are strictly entomophagpous and others being an intermediate of the two. Many feed within a single seed of a host plant. Most phytophagous species feed on conifer seeds with others feeding on seeds from Pinaceae, Cupressaceae and Taxodiaceae. Although not as many species feed on Angiosperms, there are a few that do feeding on members of Rosaceae (rose hips and rosaceous fruits), Anacardiaceae, Fabaceae, Aquifoliaceae and Hamamelidaceae.

They exhibit different degrees of specialization of their host plants. Species that are associated with Cupressaceae and Taxodiaceae are specialized to their host genus or even species. In contrast, species that are associated with Pinaceae are more capable of shifting to different host plants of the same and even different genus. This also gives rise to a hypothesis that members associated with Pinaceae may have a much higher potential to become invasive species.

Invasive outbreaks of the wasp species Eucalyptus gall wasp (Leptocybe invasa) have led to many studies on the potential biocontrol ability of this genus. There have been thirteen recorded species and species complexes in the Indomalaya, Palearctic, Afrotropic, and Neotropic realms that have been associated with eucalypt galls. Species that have a association tend to have larger clava (a club-like segment at the end of the antennae) and the width of their funicle segments strongly increasing.

== List of species ==
There have been more than 145 described species making it the largest genus in the family Megastigmidae.

A list can be found below:

- Megastigmus acaciae Noble, 1939
- Megastigmus aculeatus (Swederus, 1795)
- Megastigmus adelaidensis Girault, 1915
- Megastigmus amamoori Girault, 1925
- Megastigmus amicorum Boucek, 1969
- Megastigmus asteri Ashmead, 1900
- Megastigmus atedius Walker, 1851
- Megastigmus ater (Girault, 1927)
- Megastigmus banksiae (Girault, 1929)
- Megastigmus bipunctatus (Swederus, 1795)
- Megastigmus borriesi Crosby, 1913
- Megastigmus borus Walker, 1839
- Megastigmus brachychitoni Froggatt, 1905
- Megastigmus brachyscelidis Ashmead, 1900
- Megastigmus brevicaudis Ratzeburg, 1852
- Megastigmus brevivalvus (Girault, 1926)
- Megastigmus cecili Girault, 1929
- Megastigmus copelandi Roques & Copeland, 2016
- Megastigmus cotoneastri Nikolskaya, 1952
- Megastigmus cynipedis (Cuvier, 1833)
- Megastigmus darlingi (Girault, 1940)
- Megastigmus dorsalis (Fabricius, 1798)
- Megastigmus drances Walker, 1839
- Megastigmus duclouxiana Roques & Pan, 1995
- Megastigmus dumicola Boucek, 1982
- Megastigmus eucalypti Girault, 1915
- Megastigmus fieldingi Girault, 1915
- Megastigmus flavivariegatus Girault, 1915
- Megastigmus fulvipes (Girault, 1913)
- Megastigmus fuscicornis Girault, 1913
- Megastigmus gravis Nikolskaya, 1966
- Megastigmus grewianae Roques & Copeland, 2016
- Megastigmus grotiusi Girault, 1915
- Megastigmus helinae Roques & Copeland, 2016
- Megastigmus herndoni Girault, 1935
- Megastigmus hilaris Girault, 1929
- Megastigmus hilli Dodd, 1917
- Megastigmus hoffmeyeri Walley, 1932
- Megastigmus iamenus Walker, 1839
- Megastigmus icipeensis Roques & Copeland, 2016
- Megastigmus lanneae Roques & Copeland, 2016
- Megastigmus lasiocarpae Crosby, 1913
- Megastigmus laventhali Roques & Copeland, 2016
- Megastigmus likiangensis Roques & Sun, 1995
- Megastigmus limoni (Girault, 1926)
- Megastigmus longicauda Girault, 1913
- Megastigmus maculatipennis (Girault, 1913)
- Megastigmus melleus Girault, 1915
- Megastigmus mercatori (Girault, 1940)
- Megastigmus milleri Milliron, 1949
- Megastigmus nigripropodeum Girault, 1934
- Megastigmus nigrovariegatus Ashmead, 1890
- Megastigmus ozoroae Roques & Copeland, 2016
- Megastigmus pallidiocellus Girault, 1929
- Megastigmus pascali (Girault, 1933)
- Megastigmus pergracilis Girault, 1915
- Megastigmus pictus (Förster, 1841)
- Megastigmus pingii Roques & Sun, 1995
- Megastigmus pinsapinis Hoffmeyer, 1931
- Megastigmus pinus Parfitt, 1857
- Megastigmus pistaciae Walker, 1871
- Megastigmus quadrifasciativentris Girault, 1915
- Megastigmus quadrisetae Girault, 1927
- Megastigmus quinquefasciatus Girault, 1915
- Megastigmus quinquesetae (Girault, 1934)
- Megastigmus rafni Hoffmeyer, 1929
- Megastigmus rigidae Xu & He, 1998
- Megastigmus rosae Bouček, 1971
- Megastigmus schimitscheki Novitzky, 1954
- Megastigmus sexsetae Girault, 1927
- Megastigmus sichuanensis Doğanlar & Zheng, 2017
- Megastigmus smithi Roques & Copeland, 2016
- Megastigmus speciosus Girault, 1915
- Megastigmus specularis Walley, 1932
- Megastigmus spermotrophus Wachtl, 1893
- Megastigmus stigmatizans (Fabricius, 1798)
- Megastigmus strobilobius Ratzeburg, 1848
- Megastigmus sulcicollis Cameron, 1912
- Megastigmus suspectus Borries, 1895
- Megastigmus synophri Mayr, 1874
- Megastigmus tasmaniensis Girault, 1913
- Megastigmus thyoides Kamijo, 1997
- Megastigmus tostini Girault, 1934
- Megastigmus transvaalensis (Hussey, 1956)
- Megastigmus trisulcatus (Girault, 1915)
- Megastigmus trisulcus (Girault, 1934)
- Megastigmus usakensis Doğanlar & Zengin, 2018
- Megastigmus viggianii Narendran & Sureshan, 1988
- Megastigmus voltairei (Girault, 1925)
- Megastigmus wachtli Seitner, 1916
- Megastigmus walsinghami Girault, 1929
