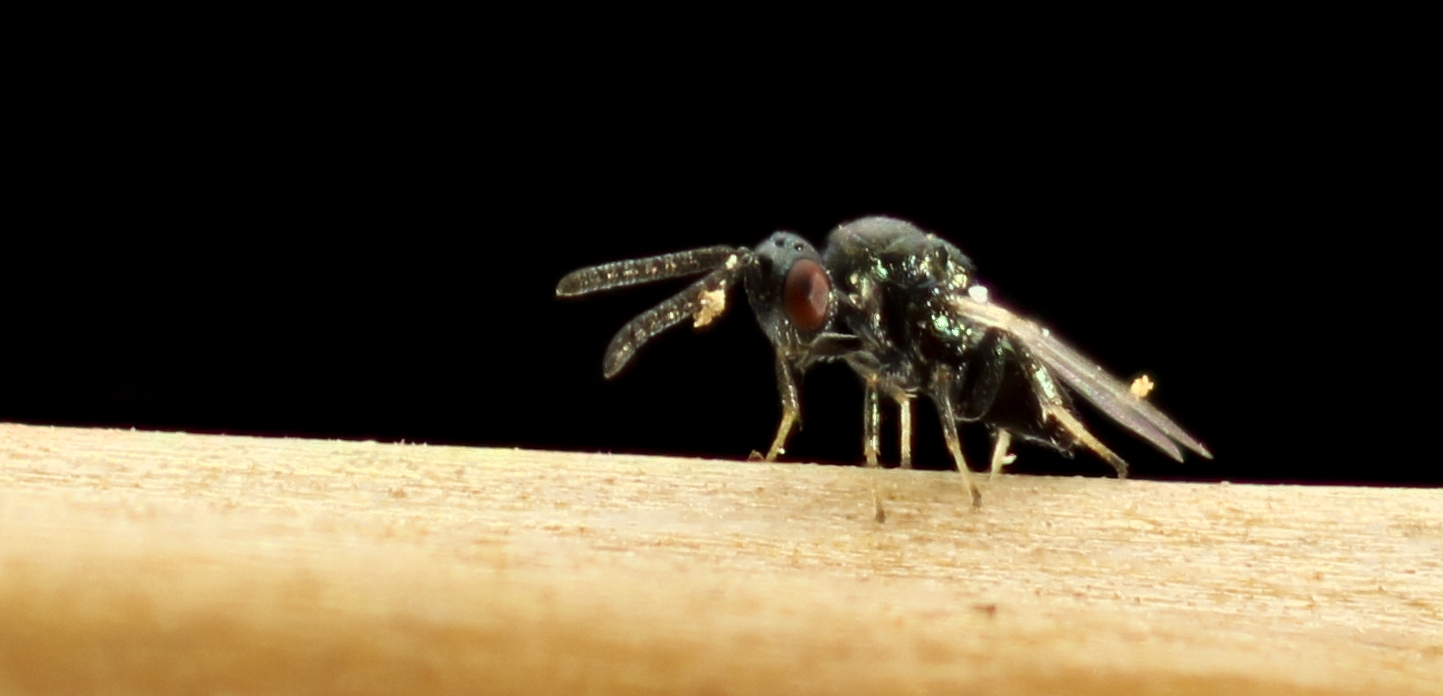

Scientific classification
- Kingdom: Animalia
- Phylum: Arthropoda
- Class: Insecta
- Order: Hymenoptera
- Family: Torymidae
- Genus: Torymus
- Species: T. tubicola

Binomial name
- Torymus tubicola (Osten-Sacken, 1870)

= Torymus tubicola =

Species of wasp

Torymus tubicola is a species of chalcid wasp in the family Torymidae.
