= Ovidia conicicollis =

Scientific classification
- Kingdom: Animalia
- Phylum: Arthropoda
- Class: Insecta
- Order: Hymenoptera
- Family: Torymidae
- Genus: Ovidia; Girault, 1924
- Species: O. conicicollis

Binomial name
- Ovidia conicicollis Girault, 1924

Species of wasp

Ovidia is a monotypic genus of wasps belonging to the family Torymidae. The only species is Ovidia conicicollis.

The species is found in Australia.
