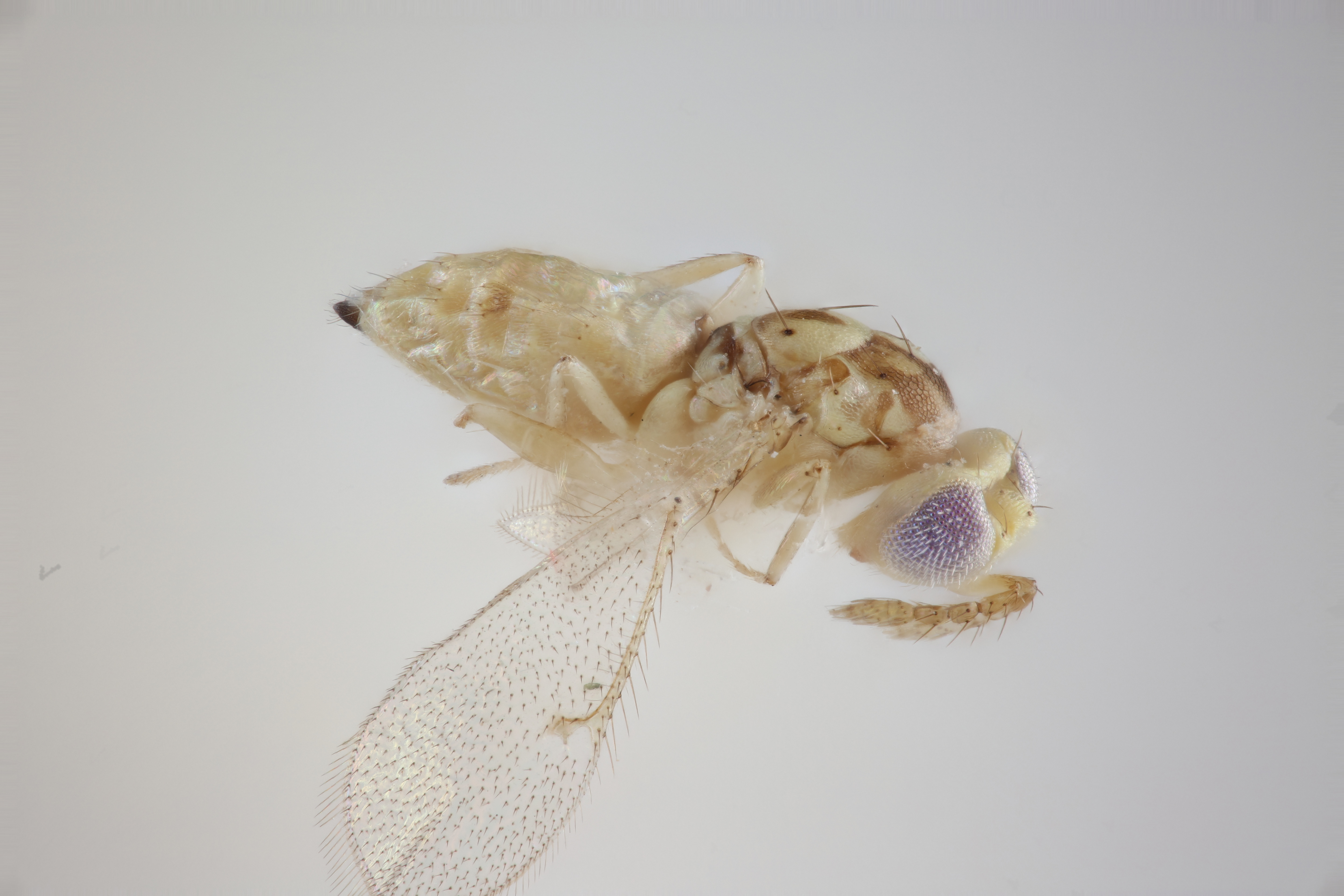
- Chrysonotomyia corynata

Scientific classification
- Kingdom: Animalia
- Phylum: Arthropoda
- Class: Insecta
- Order: Hymenoptera
- Family: Eulophidae
- Subfamily: Entedoninae
- Genus: Chrysonotomyia; Ashmead, 1904

Type species
- Chrysonotomyia auripunctata (Ashmead, 1894)

Species
- 170 species

= Chrysonotomyia =

Genus of wasps

Chrysonotomyia is a genus of small parasitoid wasps in the family Eulophidae, with over 170 described species. Members of the genus tend to attack insect larvae that feed within living plant tissue, such as gall-formers, leaf-miners and stem-miners. The Neotropics contain most described species. Within the region, most attack galls induced by Cecidomyiidae midges, although there are also records from Torymidae galls, Cynipidae galls, Psyllidae galls, Momphidae leaf mines and scale insects in the family Coccidae.

Chrysonotomyia species can be recognized by the following combination of characteristics: clypeus delimited on the sides only, postmarginal vein usually shorter than stigmal vein (although it is longer in some species), midlobe of mesoscutum with one pair of hairs (2-3 in some species), notauli poorly delimited or missing, and the flagellum with L-shaped peg sensilla.

== Species ==
The following is an inexhaustive list of Chrysonotomyia species:

=== A ===
- Chrysonotomyia abdita Hansson, 2004
- Chrysonotomyia acutangula Hansson, 2004
- Chrysonotomyia aemilia (Girault, 1917)
- Chrysonotomyia aenea (Girault, 1913)
- Chrysonotomyia aeneicoxa (Dodd, 1917)
- Chrysonotomyia aenella (Girault, 1915)
- Chrysonotomyia alajuelae Hansson, 2004
- Chrysonotomyia albicornis Hansson, 2004
- Chrysonotomyia albicoxa Hansson, 2004
- Chrysonotomyia albifascia Hansson, 2004
- Chrysonotomyia albifemur (Girault, 1915)
- Chrysonotomyia albipes (Girault & Dodd, 1913)
- Chrysonotomyia albogilva Hansson, 2004
- Chrysonotomyia alpigena Hansson, 2004
- Chrysonotomyia altamirae Hansson, 2004
- Chrysonotomyia ambonata Hansson, 2004
- Chrysonotomyia arenalicola Hansson, 2004
- Chrysonotomyia aurea (Girault, 1913)
- Chrysonotomyia auricorpus (Girault & Dodd, 1915)
- Chrysonotomyia auripunctatus (Ashmead, 1894)

=== B ===
- Chrysonotomyia babayanzi Myartseva & Kurashev, 1991
- Chrysonotomyia barbata Hansson, 2004
- Chrysonotomyia bifasciatus (Girault, 1913)
- Chrysonotomyia bimaculata Hansson, 2004
- Chrysonotomyia bivittata Hansson, 2004
- Chrysonotomyia brevicornis (Girault, 1913)
- Chrysonotomyia burrufascia Hansson, 2004

=== C ===
- Chrysonotomyia cardinalis Hansson, 2004
- Chrysonotomyia caribensis Hansson, 2004
- Chrysonotomyia casacocae Hansson, 2004
- Chrysonotomyia cecropiae Hansson, 2004
- Chrysonotomyia ciliata (Ashmead, 1894)
- Chrysonotomyia citrinigaster Hansson, 2004
- Chrysonotomyia clariscutellum (Girault, 1913)
- Chrysonotomyia claviger Paniagua & Hansson, 2009
- Chrysonotomyia cnecosoma Hansson, 2004
- Chrysonotomyia conostegiae Hansson, 2004
- Chrysonotomyia consobrinus (Girault, 1913)
- Chrysonotomyia corallina Hansson, 2004
- Chrysonotomyia cornigera Hansson, 2004
- Chrysonotomyia corynata Hansson, 2004
- Chrysonotomyia costaricana Özdikmen, 2011
- Chrysonotomyia crassipes Hansson, 2004
- Chrysonotomyia crinipennis Hansson, 2004
- Chrysonotomyia crotapha Hansson, 2004

=== D ===
- Chrysonotomyia deltaceps Hansson, 2004
- Chrysonotomyia dictyota Hansson, 2004
- Chrysonotomyia dinomerinx Hansson, 2004
- Chrysonotomyia disticha Hansson, 2004
- Chrysonotomyia dolichogaster Hansson, 2004
- Chrysonotomyia dolichura Hansson, 2004
- Chrysonotomyia dominicana Gumovsky, 2001
- Chrysonotomyia douglassi (Girault, 1913)
- Chrysonotomyia dubia (Girault, 1913)
- Chrysonotomyia dumasi (Girault, 1915)
- Chrysonotomyia dussiae Paniagua & Hansson, 2009

=== E ===
- Chrysonotomyia elongata (Sureshan & Narendran, 2001)
- Chrysonotomyia epacra Hansson, 2004
- Chrysonotomyia erugata Hansson, 2004
- Chrysonotomyia etiellae (Risbec, 1955)

=== F ===
- Chrysonotomyia fasciata Hansson, 2004
- Chrysonotomyia fasciatipennis (Girault, 1913)
- Chrysonotomyia foersteri (Girault, 1913)
- Chrysonotomyia froudei (Girault, 1922)

=== G ===
- Chrysonotomyia galbina Hansson, 2004
- Chrysonotomyia germanica (Erdös, 1956)
- Chrysonotomyia glabriscutellum (Girault, 1915)
- Chrysonotomyia godoyae Hansson, 2004
- Chrysonotomyia grandis (Girault, 1913)
- Chrysonotomyia grossa Hansson, 2004

=== H ===
- Chrysonotomyia helvola Hansson, 2004

=== I ===
- Chrysonotomyia indigitus Hansson, 2004
- Chrysonotomyia ingagena Hansson, 2004

=== J ===
- Chrysonotomyia jimenezi Hansson, 2004

=== K ===
- Chrysonotomyia karakalensis Myartseva & Kurashev, 1991

=== L ===
- Chrysonotomyia laevis Hansson, 2004
- Chrysonotomyia laeviscuta Hansson, 2004
- Chrysonotomyia lapierrei Hansson, 2004
- Chrysonotomyia latistipes Hansson, 2004
- Chrysonotomyia lavirgenensis Hansson, 2004
- Chrysonotomyia leibnitzi (Girault, 1913)
- Chrysonotomyia leucocera Hansson, 2004
- Chrysonotomyia leucopus (Ashmead, 1894)
- Chrysonotomyia leucotela Hansson, 2004
- Chrysonotomyia limbata Hansson, 2004
- Chrysonotomyia lioceps Hansson, 2004
- Chrysonotomyia liosoma Hansson, 2004
- Chrysonotomyia lividus (Ashmead, 1894)
- Chrysonotomyia locustivora (Rohwer, 1921)
- Chrysonotomyia longicaudata Paniagua & Hansson, 2009
- Chrysonotomyia longiclava Shafee & Rizvi, 1988
- Chrysonotomyia longiscuta Hansson, 2004
- Chrysonotomyia longissima Hansson, 2004
- Chrysonotomyia longus (Girault, 1915)

=== M ===
- Chrysonotomyia machaeriae Paniagua & Hansson, 2009
- Chrysonotomyia mackayensis (Girault, 1915)
- Chrysonotomyia macrura Hansson, 2004
- Chrysonotomyia maculata (Delucchi, 1962)
- Chrysonotomyia maculatipennis (Girault, 1913)
- Chrysonotomyia madhucae Singh, 2022
- Chrysonotomyia magnifica (Girault, 1913)
- Chrysonotomyia malabarica (Narendran & Surekha, 1992)
- Chrysonotomyia maurogaster Hansson, 2004
- Chrysonotomyia mayri (Girault, 1915)
- Chrysonotomyia megalops Hansson, 2004
- Chrysonotomyia melasoma Hansson, 2004
- Chrysonotomyia metallica (Ashmead, 1894)
- Chrysonotomyia micraulax Hansson, 2004
- Chrysonotomyia mira (Girault, 1934)
- Chrysonotomyia montigena Hansson, 2004
- Chrysonotomyia multitincta Hansson, 2004

=== N ===
- Chrysonotomyia nectandrigena Hansson, 2004
- Chrysonotomyia neeigena Hansson, 2004
- Chrysonotomyia nigripes (Girault, 1913)
- Chrysonotomyia niveicornis Hansson, 2004
- Chrysonotomyia niveicrus Hansson, 2004
- Chrysonotomyia niveipes (Girault, 1915)
- Chrysonotomyia novimaculatipennis (Girault, 1915)

=== O ===
- Chrysonotomyia obesula Boucek, 1986
- Chrysonotomyia occidentalis (Girault, 1915)
- Chrysonotomyia olympus (Girault, 1913)
- Chrysonotomyia osae Hansson, 2004

=== P ===
- Chrysonotomyia pallidiventris Hansson, 2004
- Chrysonotomyia pansata Hansson, 2004
- Chrysonotomyia parva Hansson, 2004
- Chrysonotomyia perlonga Hansson, 2004
- Chrysonotomyia phenacapsia (Yoshimoto, 1972)
- Chrysonotomyia pherocera Hansson, 2004
- Chrysonotomyia picta (Boucek, 1988)
- Chrysonotomyia pilata Hansson, 2004
- Chrysonotomyia piperigena Hansson, 2004
- Chrysonotomyia planipes Hansson, 2004
- Chrysonotomyia planiseta Hansson, 2004
- Chrysonotomyia postmarginaloides (Saraswat, 1975)
- Chrysonotomyia propodealis Hansson, 2004
- Chrysonotomyia pulchra (Girault, 1913)
- Chrysonotomyia pulchrella (Girault, 1915)

=== Q ===
- Chrysonotomyia quinquedentata (Girault, 1915)

=== R ===
- Chrysonotomyia reticulata Sheng & Zhan, 2000
- Chrysonotomyia rexia Narendran, 2001
- Chrysonotomyia ricini Parshuram & Agnihotri, 2017
- Chrysonotomyia rubii Hansson, 2004

=== S ===
- Chrysonotomyia santarosae Hansson, 2004
- Chrysonotomyia sarmatica (Erdös, 1966)
- Chrysonotomyia serjaniae Hansson, 2004
- Chrysonotomyia setiscuta Hansson, 2004
- Chrysonotomyia speciosus (Girault, 1913)
- Chrysonotomyia strigifer Hansson, 2004
- Chrysonotomyia striolata Hansson, 2004
- Chrysonotomyia sudoensis Paik, 1992
- Chrysonotomyia susbelli O'Loughlin et al., 2024

=== T ===
- Chrysonotomyia tekensis (Myartseva & Kurashev, 1991)
- Chrysonotomyia temporata Hansson, 2004
- Chrysonotomyia thapsina Hansson, 2004
- Chrysonotomyia thysanota Hansson, 2004
- Chrysonotomyia tobiasi Myartseva & Kurashev, 1991
- Chrysonotomyia trifasciatus (Girault, 1913)
- Chrysonotomyia tristicha Hansson, 2004
- Chrysonotomyia trjapitzini Myartseva & Kurashev, 1991
- Chrysonotomyia turkmenica Myartseva & Kurashev, 1991

=== U ===
- Chrysonotomyia unifasciata Hansson, 2004
- Chrysonotomyia unimaculata Paniagua & Hansson, 2009
- Chrysonotomyia upalacola Hansson, 2004

=== V ===
- Chrysonotomyia variclava (Girault, 1915)
- Chrysonotomyia varicolor (Girault, 1913)
- Chrysonotomyia variegata Hansson, 2004
- Chrysonotomyia varitincta Hansson, 2004
- Chrysonotomyia voltairei (Girault, 1915)

=== X ===
- Chrysonotomyia xuthotela Hansson, 2004

=== Y ===
- Chrysonotomyia younusi Hayat & Perveen, 2005

=== Z ===
- Chrysonotomyia zaommomomorpha (Girault, 1915)
