= Api Etoile =

Apple cultivar

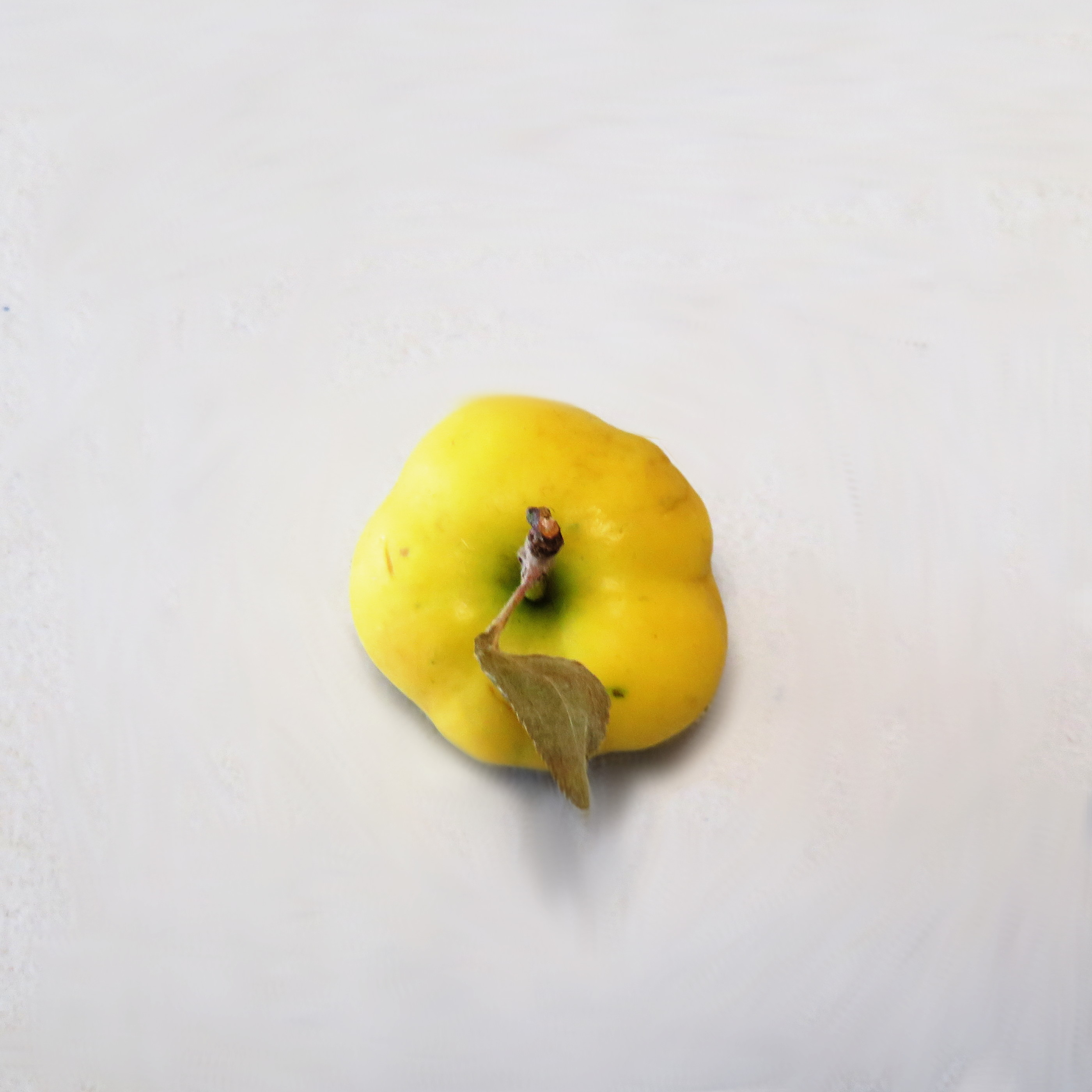
- Top view of an immature fruit showing yellow coloration and the beginning of a distinct pentagonal shape.
- Genus: Malus
- Origin: 1600s in Switzerland or France

The Api Etoile, also known as Star Apple, Pomme Etoilée, or Star Lady Apple, is an apple cultivar notable for its five prominent knobs giving it the appearance of a star. It falls into the Api family of apple cultivars.

The Api Etoile is a rare cultivar. It is cultivated at a few specialty orchards.

== Characteristics ==
The signature characteristic of the Api Etoile is its shape. The five ovaries of the apple form distinct knobs giving the apple the appearance of a rounded star. The apple has light green and pink skin. Its thick and waxy skin protects the flesh from moisture making it keep longer than other apples.

The tree possesses long and slender branches.

== History ==
Engraving of Api Etoile in Historia plantarum universalis.

The Api Etoile was first described in the 17th century by the Swiss botanist J. Bauhin in Historia plantarum universalis under the name Pomum Pentagonum (transl. pentagonal apple).

After Bauhin's death in 1613 the fruit would be cultivated in Italy and in the early 18th century it was cultivated by the Carthusians of Paris.
