= Lady apple =

Apple cultivar

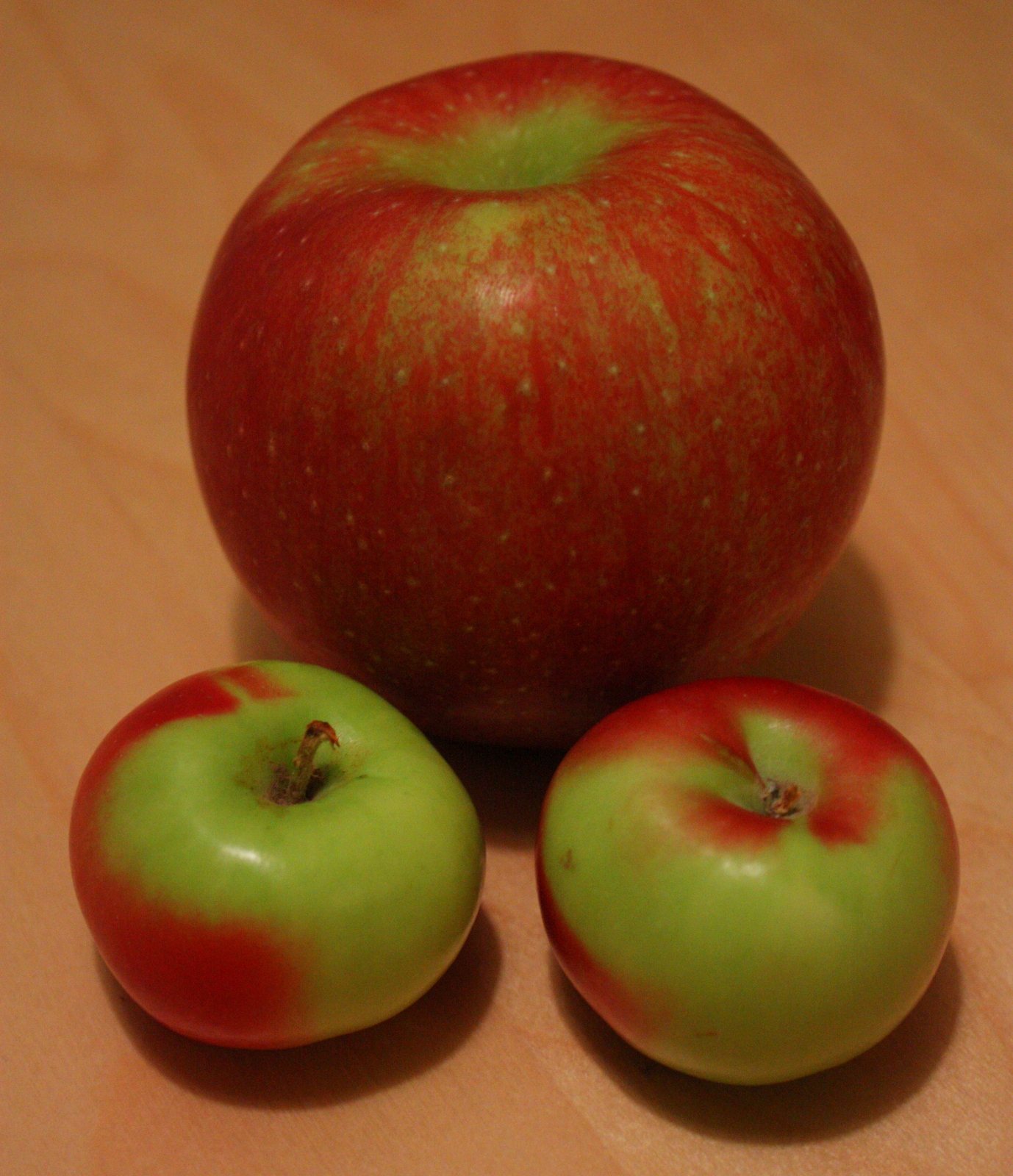
- Lady apples (bottom) in comparison to a regular-sized Pink Lady apple
- Species: Malus domestica
- Origin: France, 1628

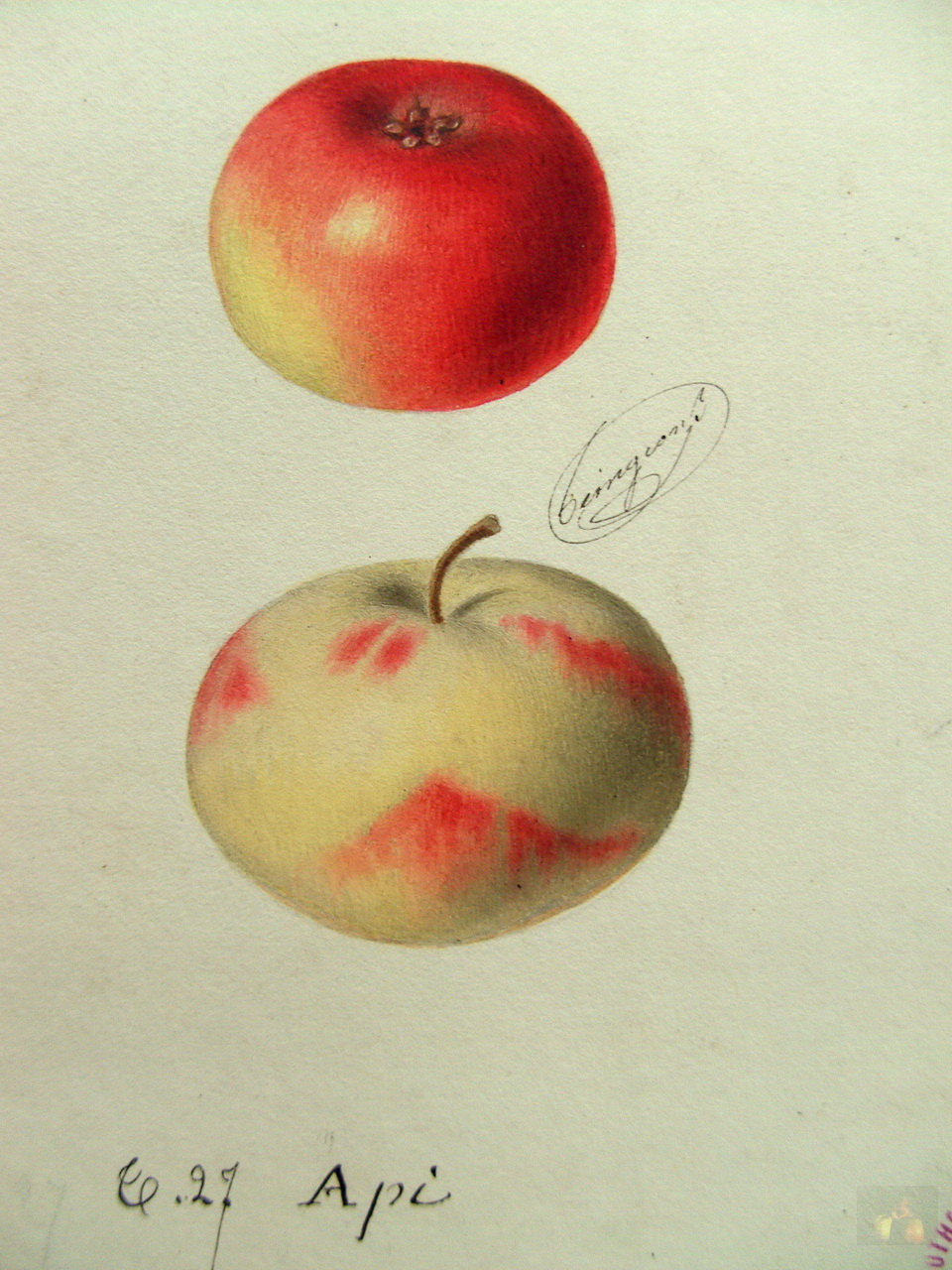
1865 watercolor of an Api apple by Alphonse Mas.

The Lady is a historic apple cultivar originating in Brittany, France in at least 1628. The cultivar has gained a variety of known names in English, and is commonly referred to as Api or the Lady Apple. (Note: Some less common names the cultivar has acquired include Nome Api, Pomme d'Api, Pomme d'Api Rouge, Api Petit, Wax Apple, Lady Sweet, Petit Api Rouge, Lady's Finger, Gros Api Rouge, and Christmas Apple.) As a seedling, the apple has the names Helen and Highland Beauty. The cultivar is known for its miniature "tiny" size, generally less than 2 inches in diameter. Its harvest time is late August and September within the Southern United States and later in higher elevations and attitudes, up to late October and early November. They are used for "dessert, cooking, cider making, and decoration," particularly during winter holidays when they are used for decorating in Christmas wreaths and garlands.

== History ==
In 1628, the apple was first recorded in the Api forest of Brittany, France. The variety flourished after being transported to America by European colonists. After the American Civil War, the apple has been exported from Virginia to Europe at prices of 10 to 30 dollars per barrel, which is more than quadruple the price of other apple varieties.

André Leroy thoroughly describes the Pomme d'Api fruits, history, and trees in his 1873 Dictionnaire de pomologie (Dictionary of apples). They are also the namesake of Jacques Offenbach's 1873 opérette, Pomme d'api.

A common claim is that the apple originates at the times of the Roman Empire as the "Appian apple" described by Pliny the Elder in the first century. In that regard, the fruit is stated to originate as cultivated by an Etruscan farmer Appius in honour of Theophrastus's botanical works. The apple has then been grown at the orchards that the Romans have established in the regions of Spain, France, and Britain. However, a connection to the Roman apple is disputed by continental pomologists.

== Infestation ==
The apple tree is often subject to infestations from the apple-seed chalcid. In a 1914 study, Cyrus R. Crosby has noted that two thirds of the examined Lady apples from an orchard have been heavily infested by the wasp. The Lady apple's smaller size allows the apple-seed chalcid's ovipositor to reach the seeds of the fruit, which it is unable to do with most other commercial apple varieties.

== Varieties ==
Aside from the foregoing sort, more cultivars are considered to fall under the Api family.

- Api Noir, or Black Lady Apple, is nearly black in colour but is almost the same in size, shape, and flavour.
- Api Etoile, or Star Lady Apple, has a similar general character. The variety has prominent angular sides, giving it the appearance of a star. The skin is deep yellow with a red patch on the side.
- Api Gros, or Pomme Rose (Note: Some less common names include Api Rose and Passe Rose.) has pale green skin that turns to yellow as it ripens. It is also slightly larger in size than the foregoing sort.
- Api Panaché is similar to the foregoing sort, but is striped red and yellow.
Api varieties
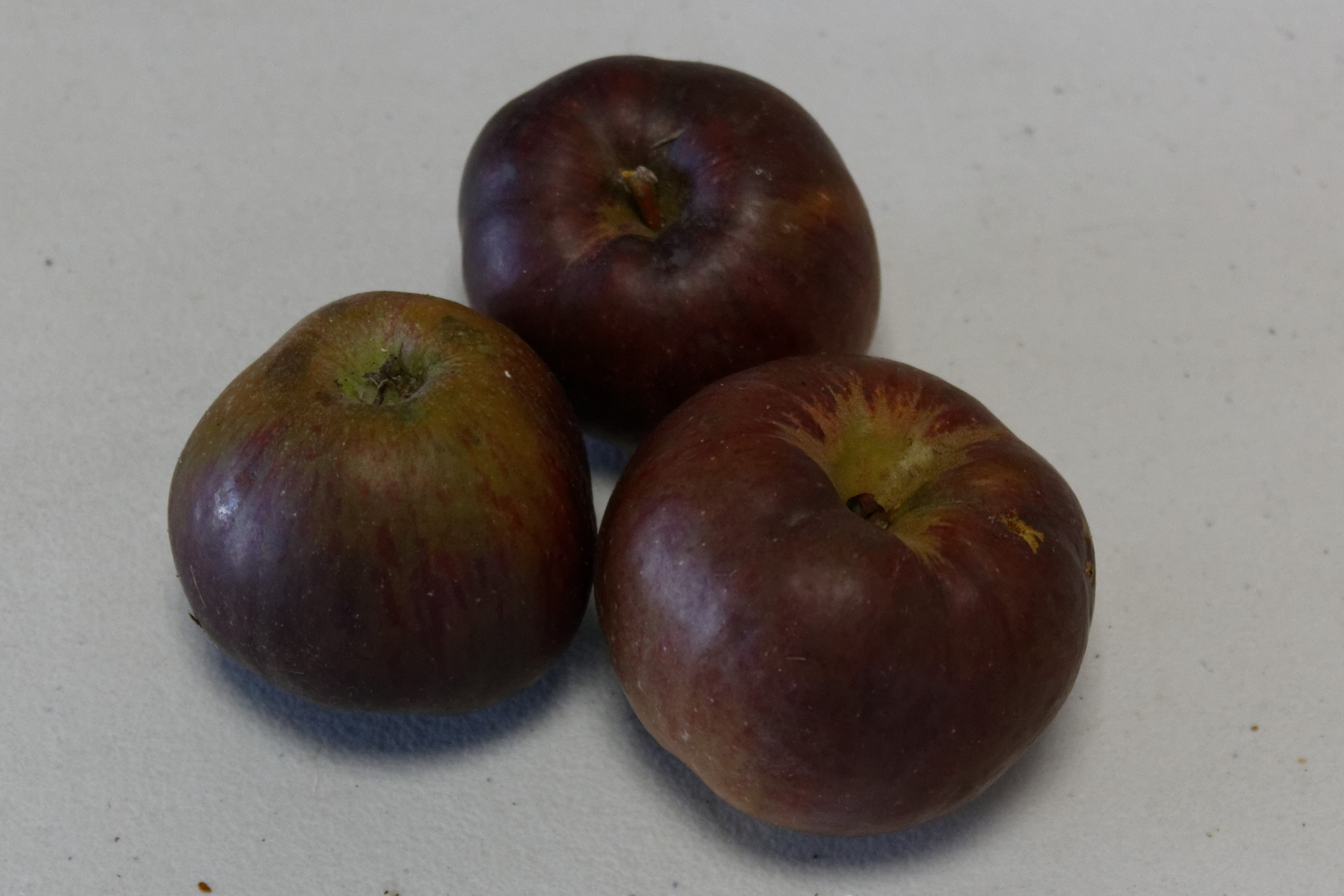
Api Noir

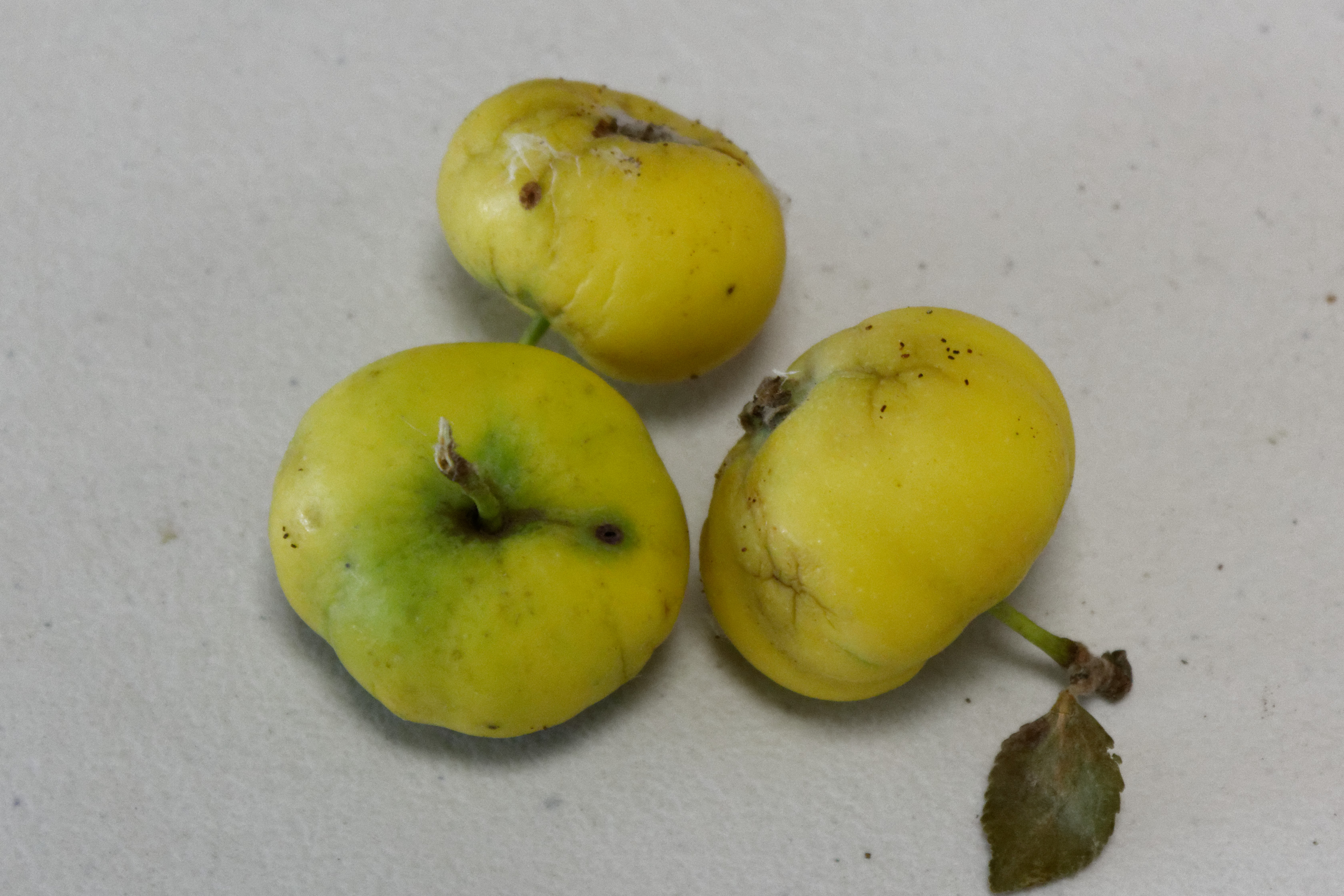
Api Etoile

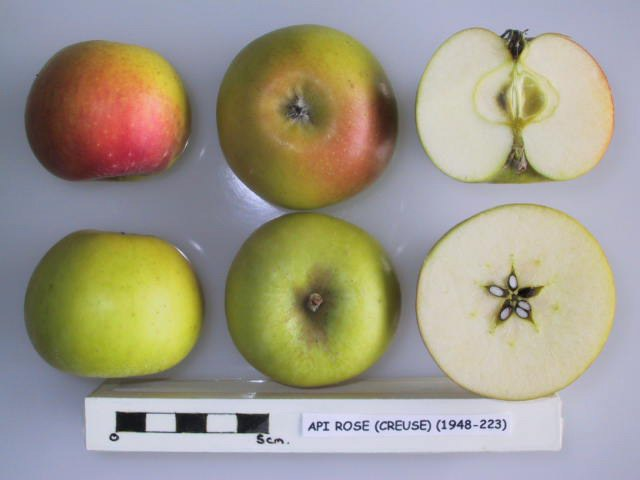
Cross-section of Api Gros
