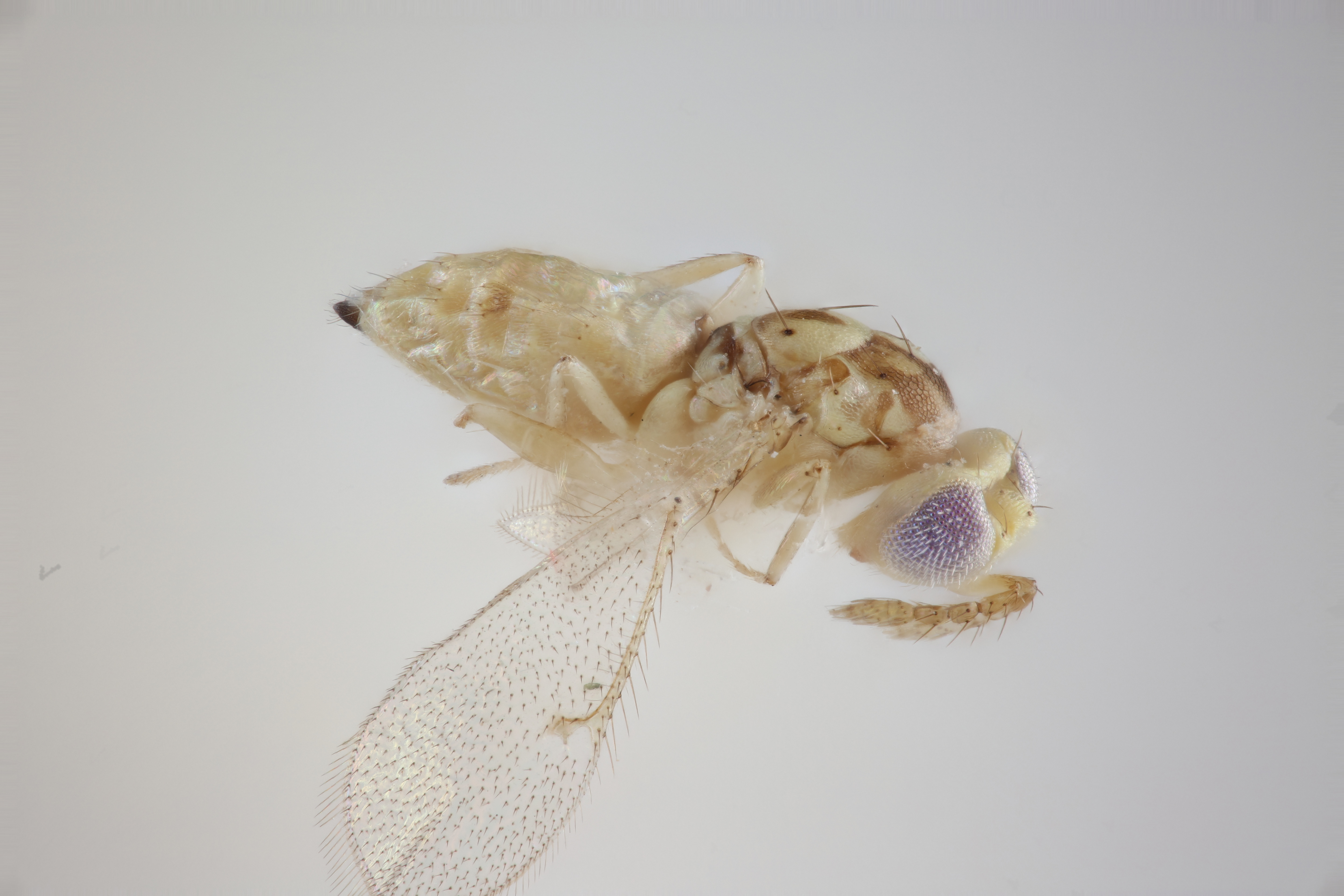
- Side view of a female C. corynata

Scientific classification
- Domain: Eukaryota
- Kingdom: Animalia
- Phylum: Arthropoda
- Class: Insecta
- Order: Hymenoptera
- Family: Eulophidae
- Genus: Chrysonotomyia
- Species: C. corynata

Binomial name
- Chrysonotomyia corynata Hansson, 2004

= Chrysonotomyia corynata =

Species of wasp

Chrysonotomyia corynata is a species of parasitoid wasp in the family Eulophidae. It was first described in 2004 from specimens collected in Mexico, specifically the states of Coahuila, Guanajuato, Michoacán, Oaxaca, Puebla and Zacatecas. The overall color of the body is pale yellow with darker brown markings on the top of the thorax. Its biology is unknown.
