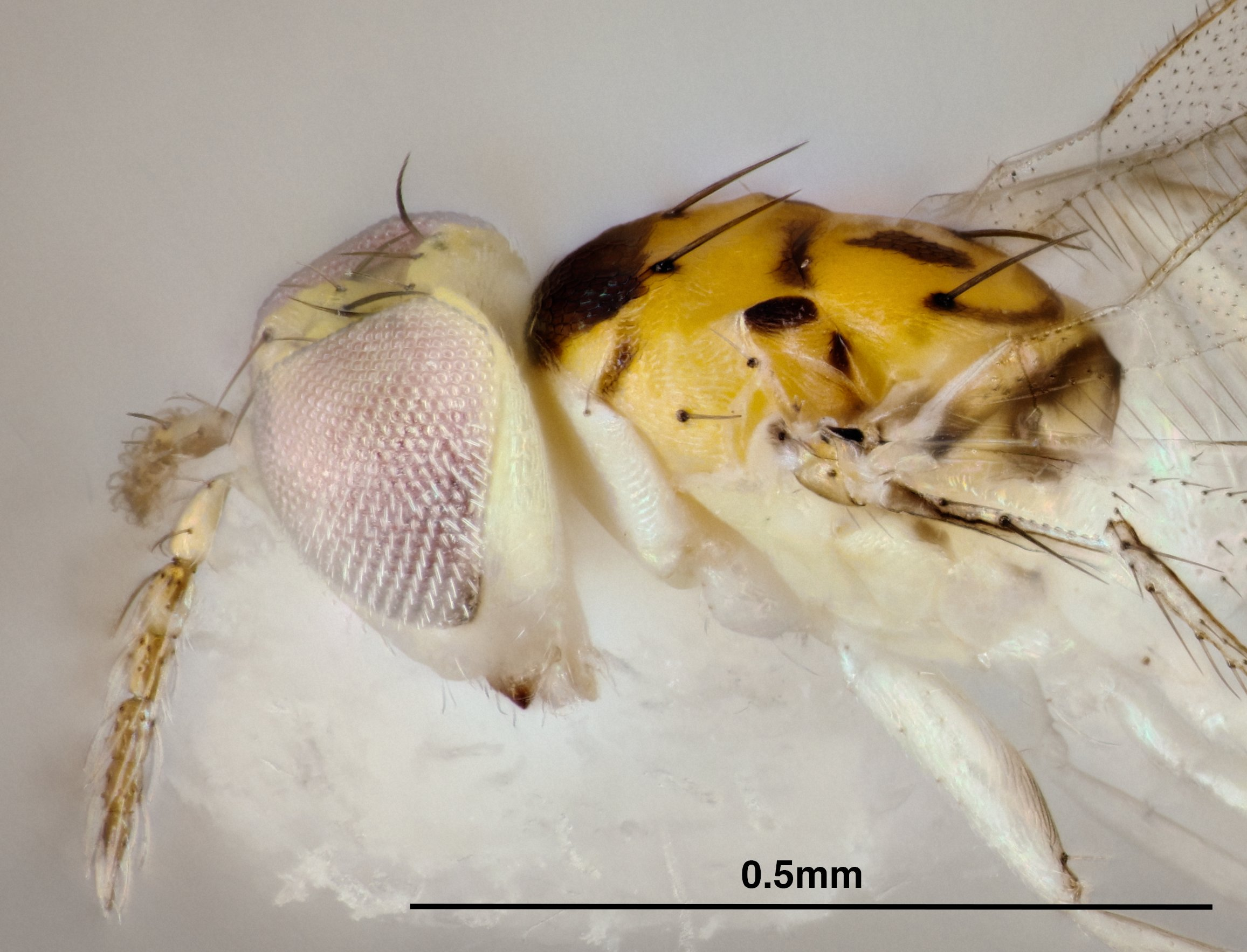
- Side view of the male syntype
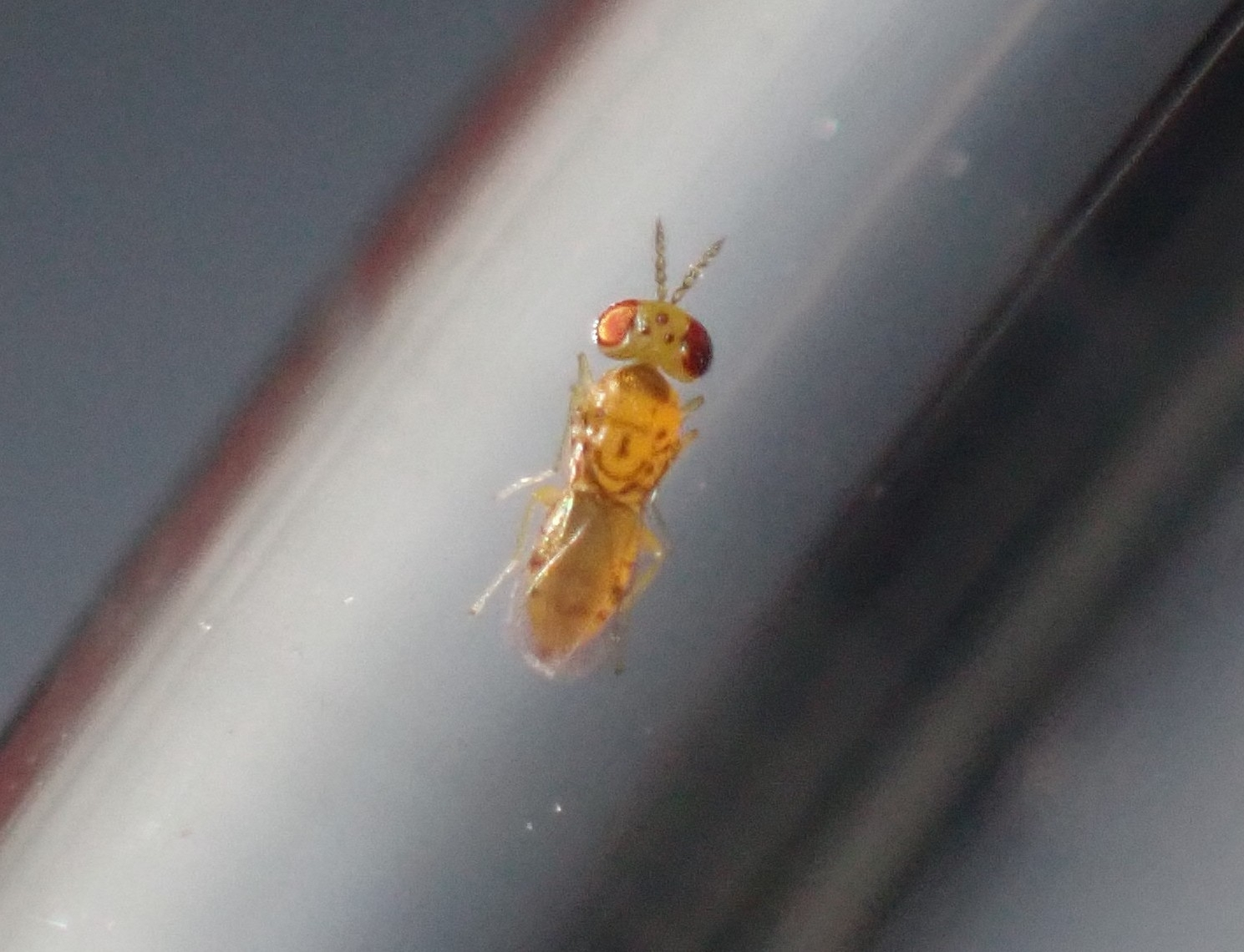
- Live Female

Scientific classification
- Domain: Eukaryota
- Kingdom: Animalia
- Phylum: Arthropoda
- Class: Insecta
- Order: Hymenoptera
- Family: Eulophidae
- Genus: Chrysonotomyia
- Species: C. susbelli

Binomial name
- Chrysonotomyia susbelli O'Loughlin, Brandão-Dias, Gates & Egan, 2024

= Chrysonotomyia susbelli =

Species of wasp

Chrysonotomyia susbelli is a species of parasitoid wasp in the family Eulophidae. First described in 2024, it is the first species of Chrysonotomyia known to parasitize Cynipid gall wasps and the 6th species known from America north of Mexico. So far, it is only known from Rice University in Houston, Texas. Its description attracted local and international media attention.

== Etymology ==
The specific epithet susbelli roughly translates to "war pig" in Latin, in reference to the mascot of Wiess College, a residential college at Rice University. Wiess's official colors are very similar to C. susbelli's dorsal coloration.

== Description ==
Chrysonotomyia susbelli is a tiny wasp, with females measuring 1.0–1.2 mm (0.039–0.047 in) and males measuring 0.9 mm (0.035 in). The upper half of the thorax is golden yellow, with various dark brown markings dorsally. These markings include a metallic brown band at the front of the mesonotum. The lower half of the thorax is pale white, creating a distinct countershading with the top half. The antennae have a pale scape and a light yellow pedicel with the inner apical two-thirds dark brown. The remaining antennal segments are darker yellow with the final segment dark brown. The eyes are pink. The abdomen, similar to the thorax, is golden yellow above with dark brown banding and pale white below. The male C. susbelli is very similar to the female except for its smaller size and more intensely colored dark brown markings.

== Biology ==
Chrysonotomyia susbelli is known to parasitize Neuroterus bussae, a gall wasp in the family Cynipidae. N. bussae forms small clusters of fleshy, round galls on the leaves of the southern live oak (Quercus virginiana) in Spring. Chrysonotomyia susbelli has been observed emerging from Neuroterus bussae galls from 18 April to 10 May and observed active on live oak leaves up to 18 May. Additionally, adult females were observed to only walk in zigzags in both field and lab conditions.
