= Clava =

Clava can refer to:

- Mu Boötis, a triple star system in the constellation Boötes
- Clava cairn, a type of Bronze Age circular chamber tomb cairn
- Gracile nucleus, an area of the brain that participate in the sensation of fine touch and proprioception of the lower body
- The club-like segments at the end of some insect antennae
- Clava (cnidarian), a genus of marine hydroid
