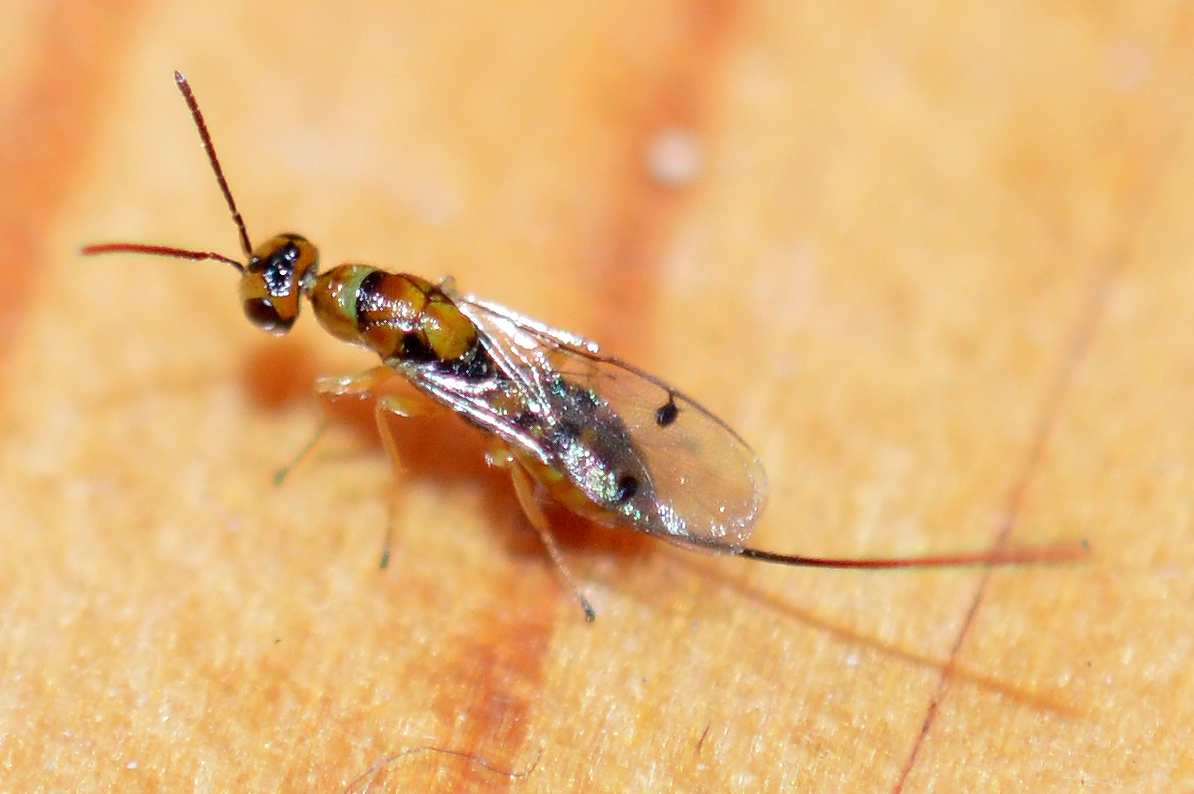
- Megastigmus, Bulgaria

Scientific classification
- Kingdom: Animalia
- Phylum: Arthropoda
- Clade: Pancrustacea
- Class: Insecta
- Order: Hymenoptera
- Suborder: Apocrita
- Infraorder: Proctotrupomorpha
- Superfamily: Chalcidoidea
- Family: Megastigmidae; Thomson, 1876

= Megastigmidae =

Family of wasps

Megastigmidae is a family of chalcidoid wasps in the order Hymenoptera. There are about 12 genera and more than 170 described species in Megastigmidae. Megastigmidae was formerly considered a subfamily of the family Torymidae.

== Morphology ==
Most megastigmids range in colour from yellow to brown. However, some may feature patches of metallic green.

Megastigmids can generally be recognized among other Chalcidoidea by the presence of an enlarged stigma on the wing, often with an infuscate area around the stigma. They can be confused for Torymidae, within which they were formerly nested, due to their similar range in body sizes, and the long excised ovipositor in females. However, the presence of this enlarged stigma and the presence of 6 flagellomeres between the pedicel and clava (instead of 8 in Torymidae) separate the megastigmids.

== Ecology ==
Larval megastigmids show a wide variety of life history strategies. Some species are phytophagous, while others are parasitoids. Many species oviposit in galls, in which some species are parasitoids of the gall host, while others are inquilines.

== Genera ==
- Bootanelleus Girault, 1915
- Bootania Dalla Torre, 1897
- Bootanomyia Girault, 1915
- Bortesia Pagliano & Scaramozzino, 1990
- Ianistigmus Bouček, 1988
- Macrodasyceras Kamijo, 1962
- Malostigmus Bouček, 1988
- Mangostigmus Bouček, 1986
- Megastigmus Dalman, 1820
- Neomegastigmus Girault, 1915
- Paramegastigmus Girault, 1915
- Striastigmus Böhmová & Janšta, 2022
- Vitreostigmus Böhmová & Janšta, 2022
- Westralianus Bouček, 1988
