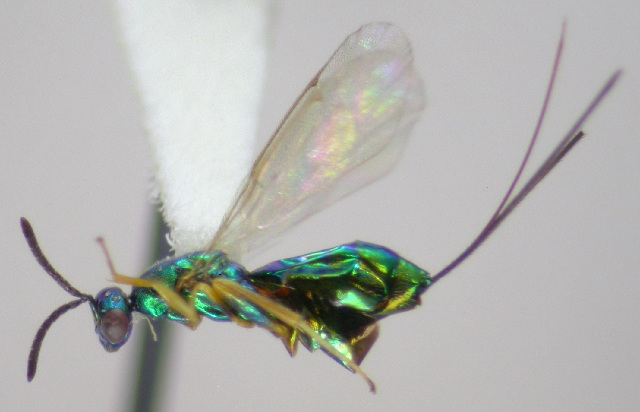
- Torymus cecidomyae

Scientific classification
- Kingdom: Animalia
- Phylum: Arthropoda
- Clade: Pancrustacea
- Class: Insecta
- Order: Hymenoptera
- Family: Torymidae
- Subfamily: Toryminae
- Genus: Torymus; Dalman, 1820

Type species
- Torymus bedeguaris (Linnaeus, 1758)

Species
- 400+ species

Synonyms
- Callimome Spinola, 1811; Callimomus Thomson, 1876; Diamorus Walker, 1834; Dihomerus Schulz, 1906; Diomorus Walker, 1834; Hemitorymus Ashmead, 1904; Lioterphus Thomson, 1876; Misocampe Latreille, 1818; Misocampus Stephens, 1829; Nannocerus Mayr, 1885; Parasympiesis Brèthes, 1927; Syntomaspis Förster, 1856

= Torymus =

Genus of wasps

Torymus is a genus of chalcid wasps from the family Torymidae, and there are more than 400 spp. worldwide. It was named by the Swedish naturalist Johan Wilhelm Dalman in 1820. Most species are ectoparasitoids of gall forming insects, usually gall wasps and gall midges.

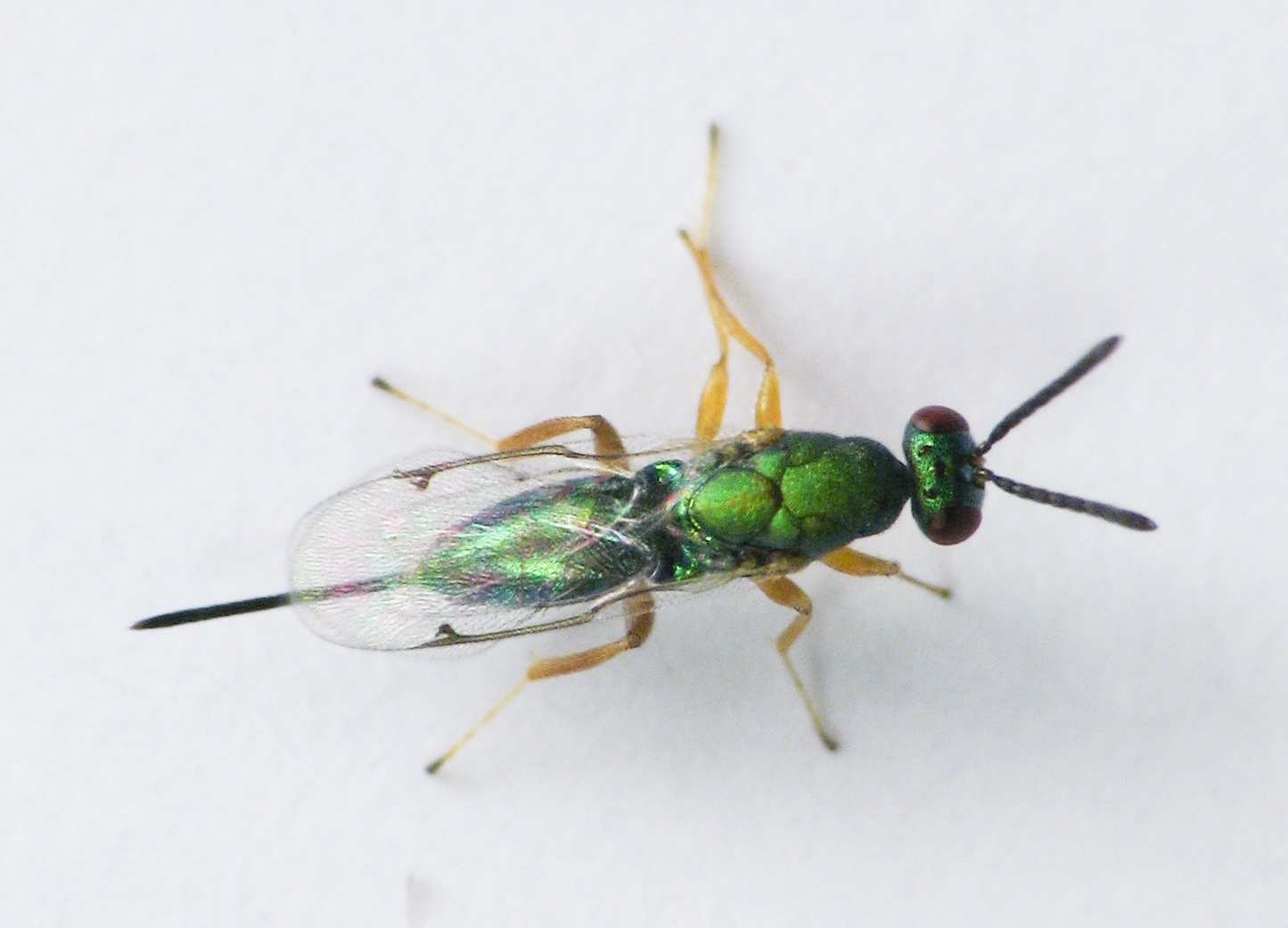
Torymus sp., female

== See also ==
- List of Torymus species
