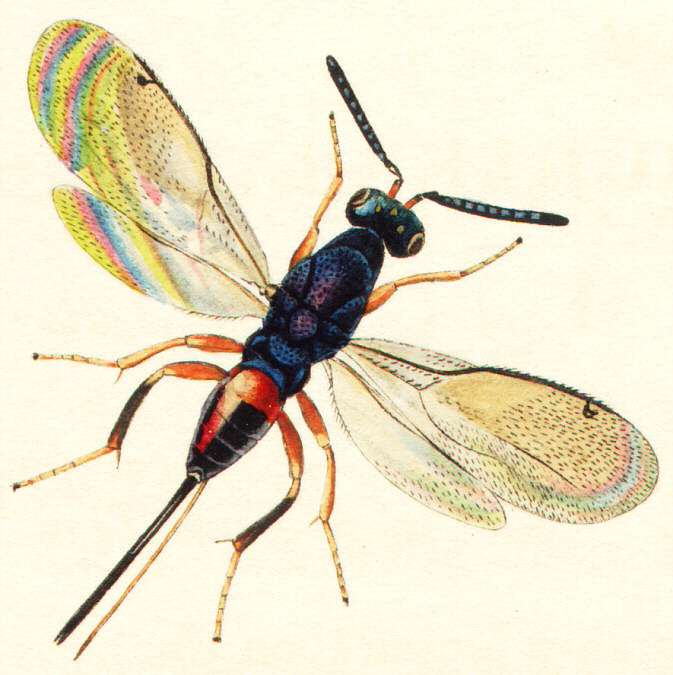
- Torymus nobilis Boheman, 1834

Scientific classification
- Kingdom: Animalia
- Phylum: Arthropoda
- Class: Insecta
- Order: Hymenoptera
- Superfamily: Chalcidoidea
- Family: Torymidae; Walker, 1833

Subfamilies and tribes
- Chalcimerinae; Toryminae; Boucekinini; Torymoidini; Torymini; Glyphomerinae; Microdontomerinae (=Erimerinae); Monodontomerinae; Podagrioninae; Propalachiini; Palachiini; Podagrionini

Diversity
- 2 to 6 subfamilies about 70 genera about 960 species

= Torymidae =

Torymidae Temporal range: Ypresian–Recent

Family of wasps

Torymidae is a family of wasps in the superfamily Chalcidoidea. Most species in this family are small with attractive metallic coloration, and females generally have long ovipositors. Many are parasitoids on gall-forming insects, and some are phytophagous (plant-eating) species, sometimes using the galls formed by other insects. Over 960 species in about 70 genera are found worldwide. They are best recognized in that they are one of the few groups of Chalcidoidea in which the cerci are visible.

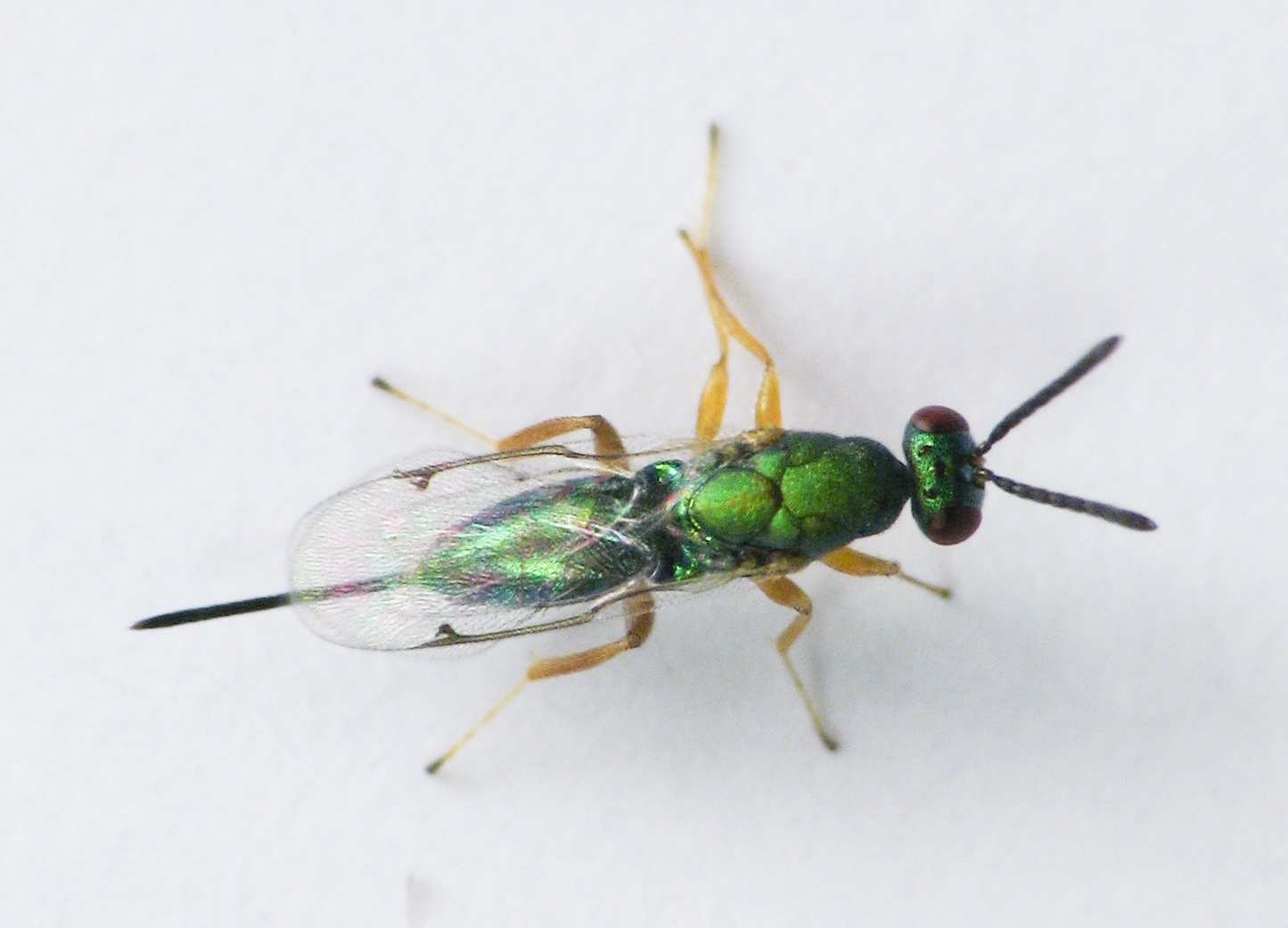
Torymus female

== Systematics ==
The family was first described by English entomologist Francis Walker in 1833 and the infrafamiliar classification has been revised several times. A number of subfamilies were created within Torymidae, some of which have since been transferred to other families (Idarninae, Sycophaginae, Epichrysomallinae, and Ormyrinae), leaving the family with up to six subfamilies, although as few as two in other classifications.

- Megastigminae
- Monodontomerinae
- Toryminae
- Podagrioninae
- Erimerinae (=Microdontomerinae)
- Thaumatoryminae

A phylogenetic analysis in 2018 found that Torymidae as then circumscribed was not monophyletic. The subfamily Megastigminae recovered outside the clades contain the other subfamilies and elevated to family Megastigmidae in a taxonomic revision. The subfamilies and tribes of Torymidae were also revised.

- Torymidae sensu stricto
  - Chalcimerinae
  - - Toryminae
      - Boucekinini
      - - Torymoidini
        - Torymini
    - - - Glyphomerinae
        - Microdontomerinae (=Erimerinae)
      - - Monodontomerinae
        - Podagrioninae
          - Propalachiini
          - - Palachiini
            - Podagrionini
