= Daresbury (house) =

Building in Christchurch, New Zealand

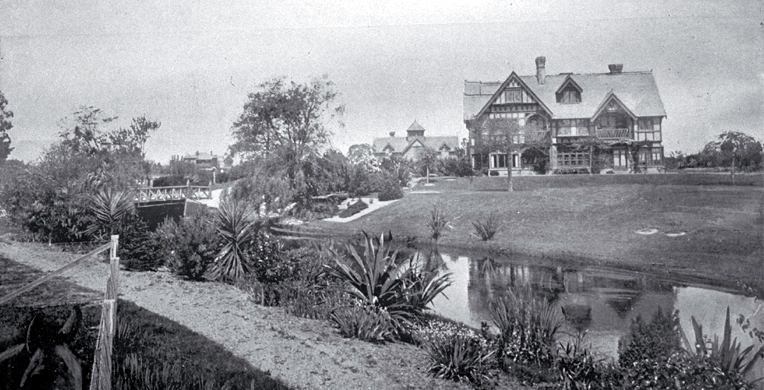
- Daresbury Rookery in 1902
- Interactive map of the Daresbury area
- Former names: Daresbury Rookery

General information
- Type: Residential home
- Architectural style: Arts and Crafts movement
- Location: Fendalton, 67 Fendalton Road (front entrance); 9 Daresbury Lane (rear entrance), Christchurch, New Zealand
- Coordinates: 43.5217°S 172.6055°E
- Construction started: 1897
- Completed: 1901
- Renovated: 2009/10
- Owner: James Milne

Technical details
- Structural system: triple brick, with upper stories half-timbered
- Floor count: three

Design and construction
- Architect: Samuel Hurst Seager
- Awards: Christchurch Horticultural Society garden competition (1932); Supreme Award of the Christchurch Civic Trust (2010)

Heritage New Zealand – Category 1
- Designated: 2 April 1985
- Reference no.: 3659

References
- "Daresbury". New Zealand Heritage List/Rārangi Kōrero. Heritage New Zealand.

Daresbury, earlier known as Daresbury Rookery is one of the finest grand houses in Christchurch, New Zealand. Designed in the English Domestic Revival style, it is one of the best designs of Samuel Hurst Seager.

== History ==
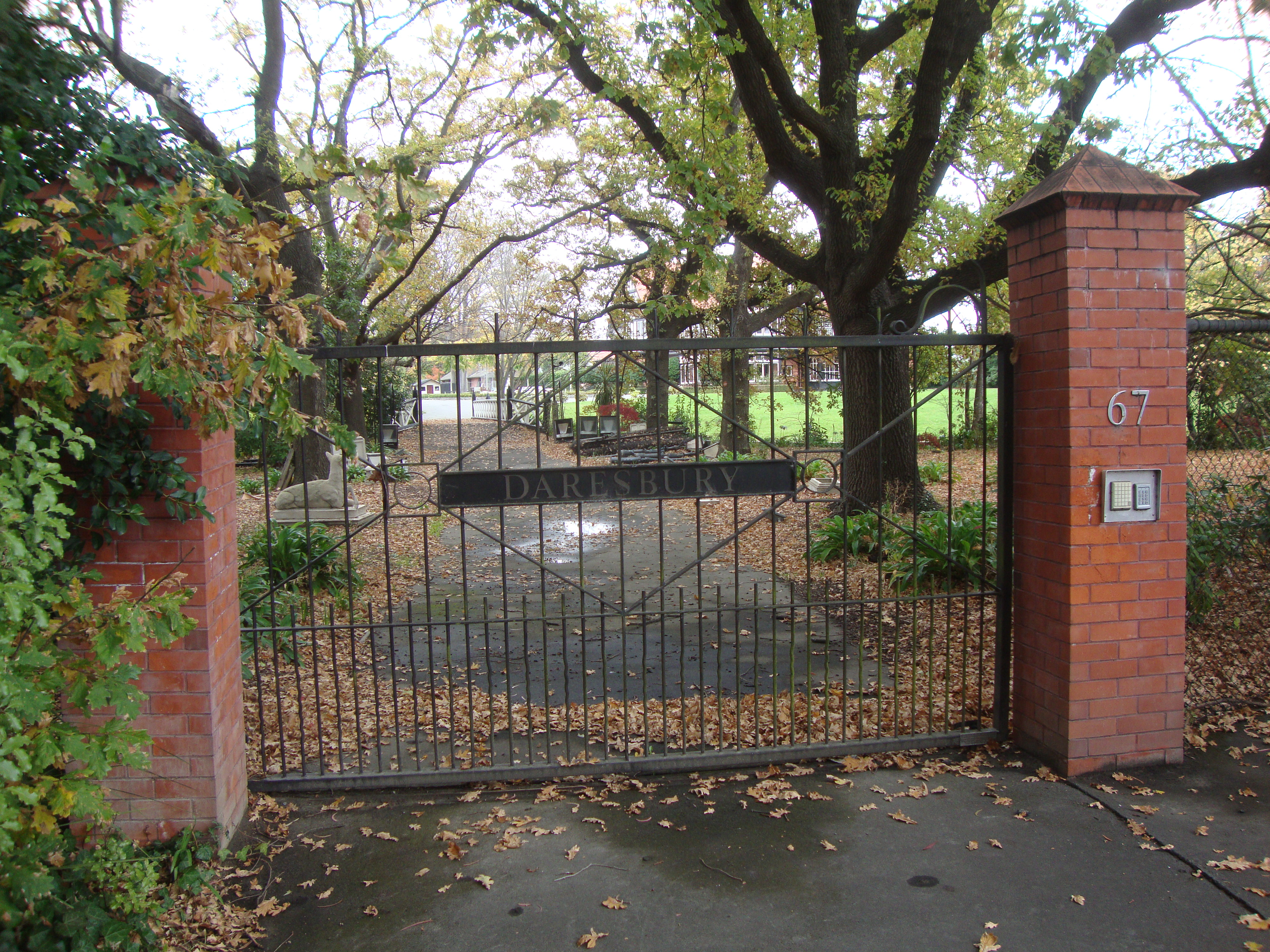
Fendalton Road entry of Daresbury

Daresbury was designed by Samuel Hurst Seager for the wine and spirits merchant George Humphreys. It was built between 1897 and 1901. It is regarded as Seager's best large house. Originally, the house was set on 10 hectares (100,000 m^{2}), with the land having been subdivided off the Deans family. It was initially added to until 1910, when it had 50 rooms and five live-in staff.

Jane Deans had planted 100 blue gums in 1862 on the property. Rooks were nesting in the trees, hence the name Daresbury Rookery. The trees became infested by gall-making wasps (family Eulophidae, probably Ophelimus maskelli or Leptocybe invasa) and the rooks left in the 1930s. A snow storm in 1945 further damaged the trees. The last gum tree was cut down in 1952.

Between 1940 and 1950, Daresbury was the official residence of the Governor-General. Over time, the land was subdivided, with 20 sections sold in 1954. Today, the building sits on 0.91 hectares (9,100 m^{2}).

The property was in family ownership until 1985. It was later owned by Libby and Denver Glass, who had to sell it again. They bought it back from developers Dennis Thompson and Sharon Bartlett in 2008 in a mortgagee sale.

Although earthquake strengthened by the Glass family, the building suffered damage in the 2010 Canterbury earthquake, with one of the six large chimneys collapsed and fell through the roof. The remaining chimneys were removed by crane.

In 2018 James Milne bought the house with the intention of restoring it as a family home but this has proved too costly and it is likely to be demolished to make room for a proposed a $50 million housing development.

According to evidence submitted to the Independent Hearings Panel (IHP), Mr Milne purchased the Deasbury House property with an intention to subdivide the site, rather than solely to establish a family home. Restoration work on the building was reportedly contingent on obtaining public funding from Heritage New Zealand or the Christchurch City Council.

=== Heritage registration ===
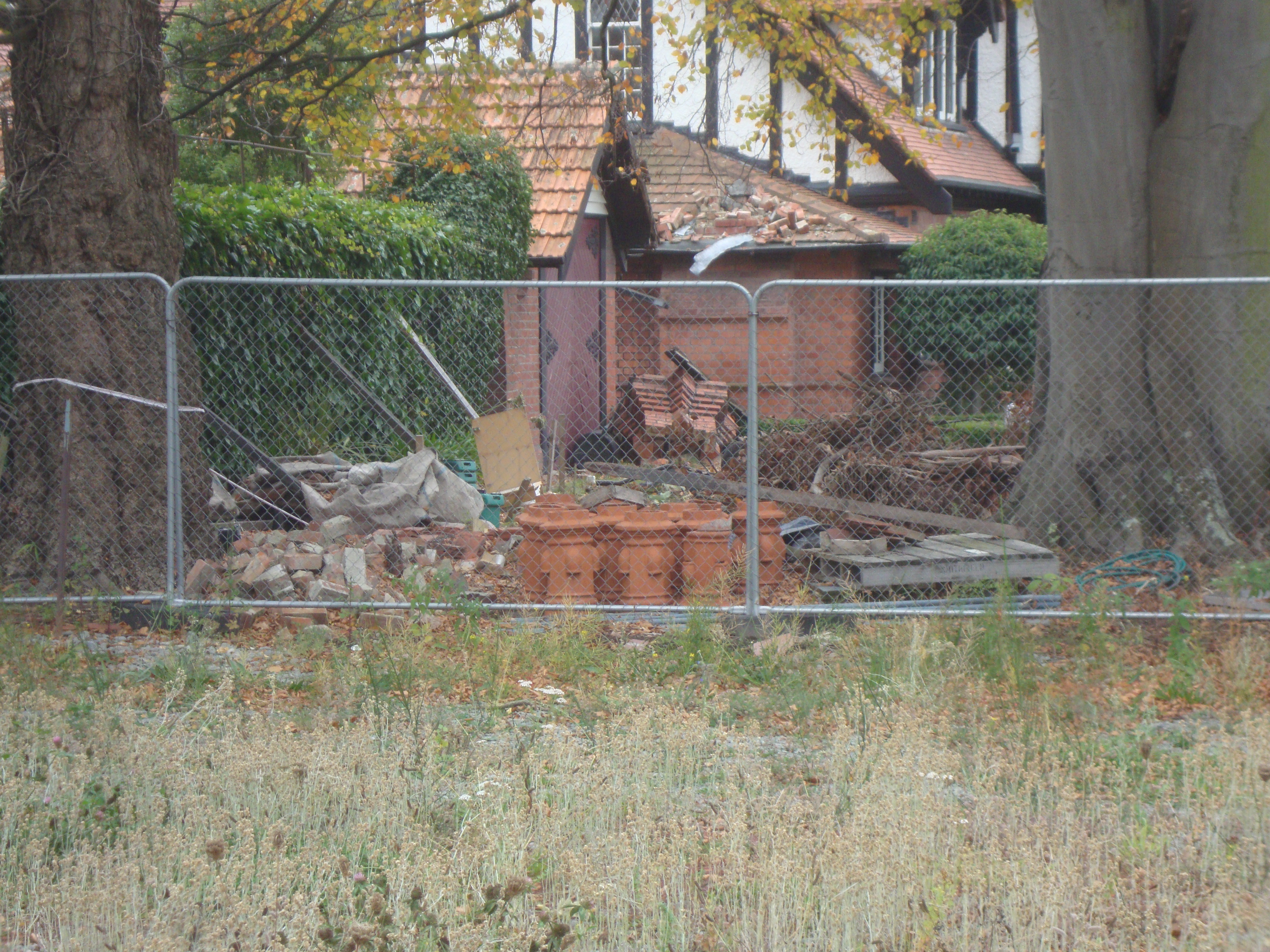
Following the 2010 Canterbury earthquake, the building's chimney pots were removed and stored in the garden.

The building was registered as a heritage building by the New Zealand Historic Places Trust on 2 April 1985 with registration number 3659 classified as A. With the change of the classification system, the building later became a Category I listing.

On 17 September 2025 the Christchurch City Council removed the heritage status allowing for the demolition of the earthquake damaged building. An independent hearings panel said the public interest in keeping Daresbury House did not outweigh the economic reality. It was expected to cost several million to repair, and it would not be “financially reasonable or appropriate” to keep the heritage protections.

== Architecture and awards ==
Daresbury is an example of the English Domestic Revival style, also known as the Arts and Crafts movement. It is built of triple brick, and the upper stories are half-timbered.

In 1932, the property won the Christchurch Horticultural Society garden competition. In 2010, it won the Supreme Award of the Christchurch Civic Trust for restoration and refurbishment. The awards ceremony was held on 30 November, i.e. several weeks after Daresbury received significant damage from the 4 September 2010 Canterbury earthquake.

== See also ==
- List of historic places in Christchurch
