= Australsecodes =

Scientific classification
- Domain: Eukaryota
- Kingdom: Animalia
- Phylum: Arthropoda
- Class: Insecta
- Order: Hymenoptera
- Family: Eulophidae
- Subfamily: Opheliminae
- Genus: Australsecodes; Girault, 1928

Type species
- Australsecodes bicolor (Girault, 1915)

Species
- Australsecodes ater Girault, 1935; Australsecodes bicolor (Girault, 1915); Australsecodes elachertiformis (De Santis, 1955); Australsecodes latiscapus Girault, 1929

Genus of wasps

Australsecodes is a genus of hymenopteran insects of the family Eulophidae.
