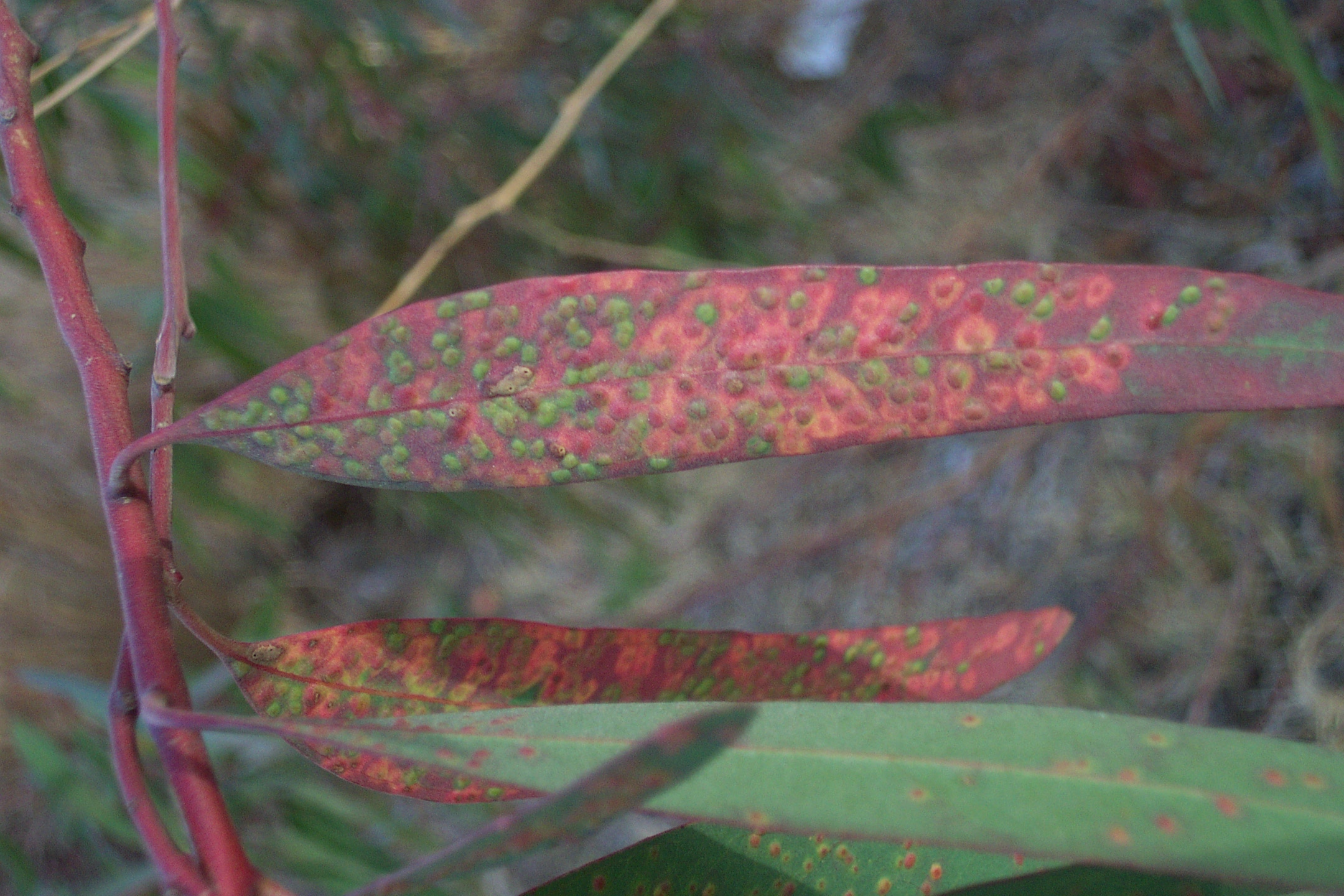
- galls caused by Ophelimus maskelli on Eucalyptus sp

Scientific classification
- Kingdom: Animalia
- Phylum: Arthropoda
- Class: Insecta
- Order: Hymenoptera
- Family: Eulophidae
- Subfamily: Opheliminae
- Genus: Ophelimus; Haliday, 1844

Type species
- Ophelimus ursidus (Walker, 1839)

Species
- 53 species

= Ophelimus =

Genus of wasps

Ophelimus is a genus of hymenopteran insects of the family Eulophidae. Members of this genus induce galls on Eucalyptus plants.
