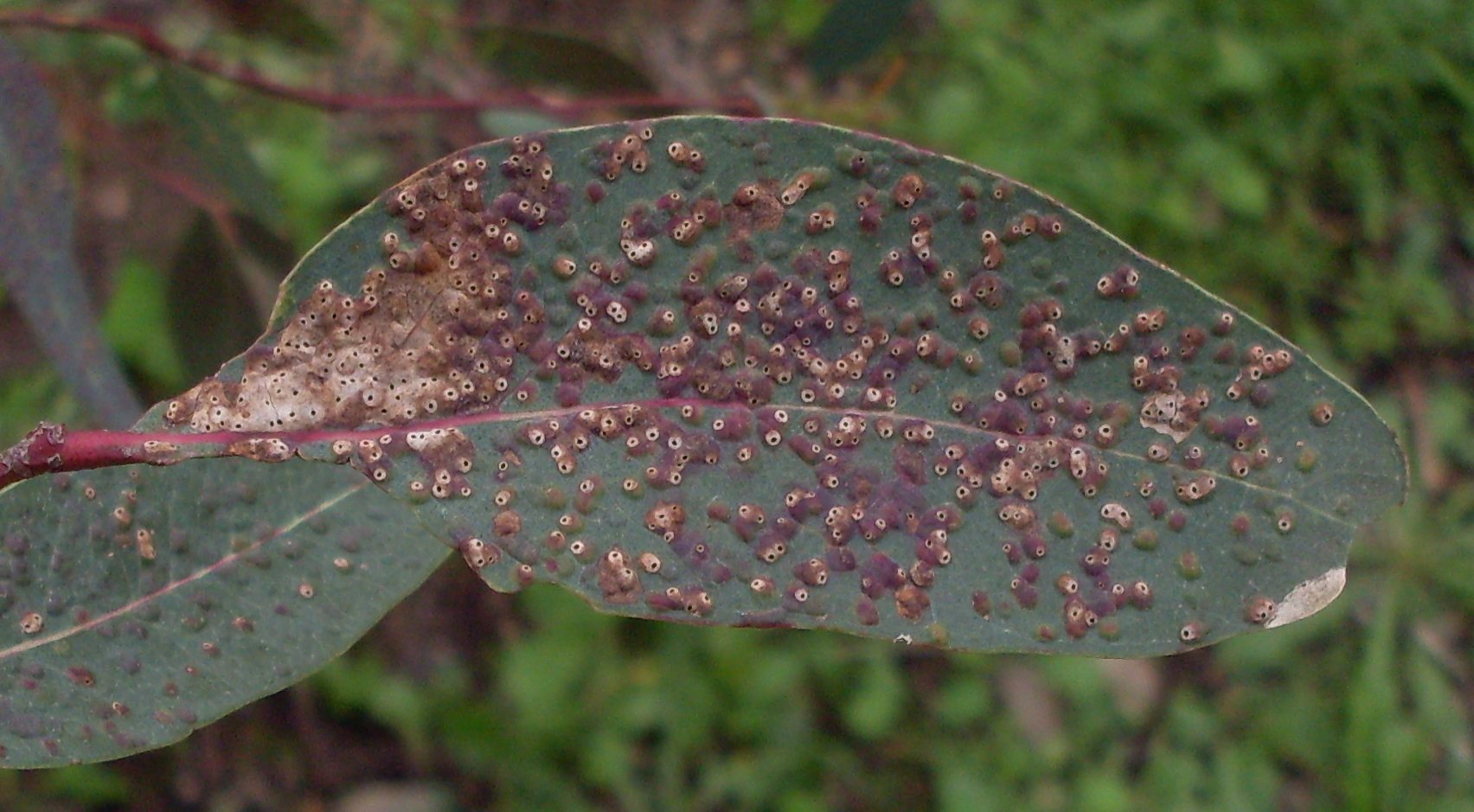
- Galls on Eucalyptus caused by Ophelimus maskelli

Scientific classification
- Kingdom: Animalia
- Phylum: Arthropoda
- Clade: Pancrustacea
- Class: Insecta
- Order: Hymenoptera
- Family: Eulophidae
- Genus: Ophelimus
- Species: O. maskelli

Binomial name
- Ophelimus maskelli (Ashmead, 1900)

Synonyms
- Pteroptrix maskelli Ashmead, 1900

= Ophelimus maskelli =

Species of wasp

Ophelimus maskelli is a species of chalcid wasp about 1mm long, known as the eucalyptus gall wasp, indigenous to Australia and New Zealand, and invasive in the Mediterranean, the Middle East, North Africa, South Africa, tropical Asia (from Vietnam to Indonesia), and the United States (California). It is considered a plant pest as females lay eggs on immature eucalyptus leaves; the larvae produce galls on the leaves. Heavy infestations induce much galling which causes widespread defoliation and loss of growth. Wasps may emerge in large numbers in the spring, forming clouds which are a nuisance to humans.

In Australia and Israel members of the genus of fairy wasps, Stethynium, were being investigated in 2006 as possible biological control agents for Ophelimus maskelli. Releases of three parasitoids in Israel were successful in greatly reducing the numbers of O. maskelli, though only two of these parasitoids - Closterocerus chamaeleon (Eulophidae), and Stethynium ophelimi (Mymaridae) - subsequently proliferated and spread through the Mediterranean Basin, where they have proven to be excellent biological control agents.
