= Massey Memorial =

Mausoleum of New Zealand Prime Minister William Massey

- New Zealand
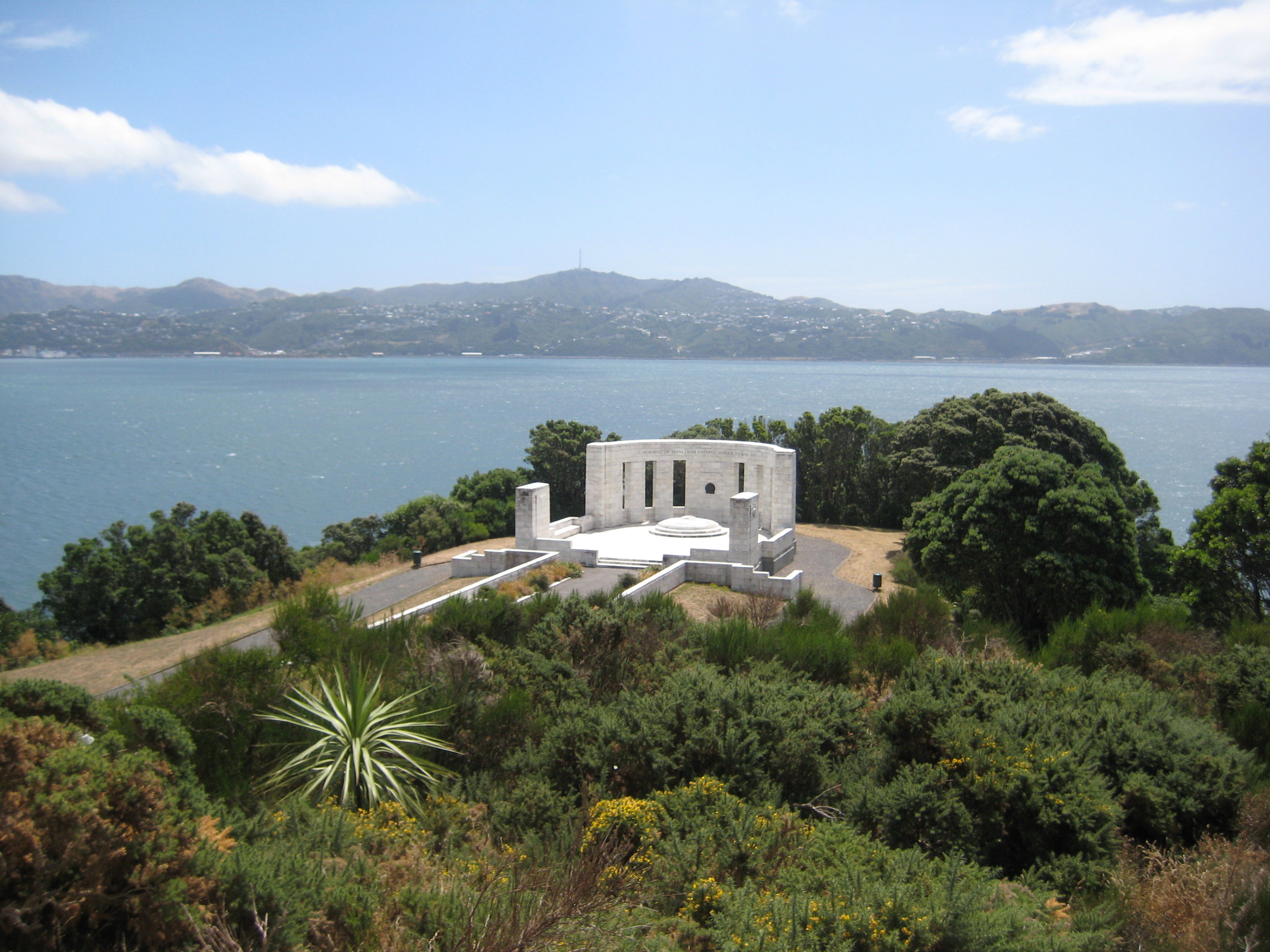
- For William Massey
- Unveiled: 1930
- Location: 41°17′07″S 174°49′34″E; Wellington
- Designed by: Samuel Hurst Seager in conjunction with Gummer and Ford

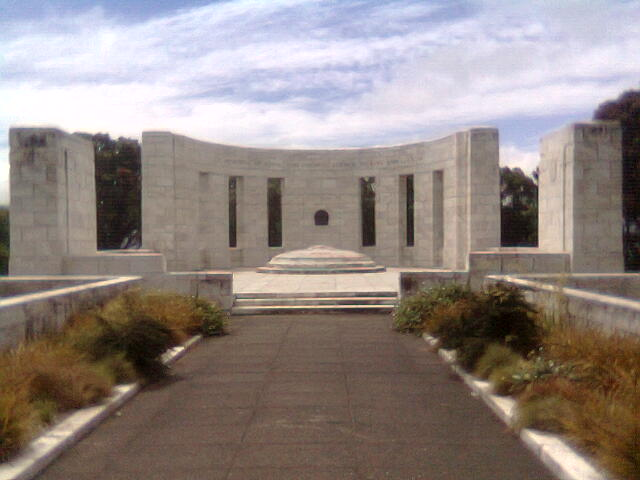

The Massey Memorial is the mausoleum of New Zealand Prime Minister William Massey, at Point Halswell on the Miramar Peninsula, Wellington, New Zealand.

== History ==
Massey was Prime Minister from 1912 to 1925, when he died in office. After his death Parliament passed the Massey Burial-ground Act, which allocated 0.8 hectares of land for a burial ground for him and his widow Christina. The land had been used for defence purposes during World War I and had lain unused since then. A fort was converted to a crypt and a gun-pit lined with marble to serve as a vault. The rest of the memorial was completed in 1930 at a cost of £15,000, most of which was raised by public subscription.

== Design ==
The memorial was designed by established memorial designer Samuel Hurst Seager in conjunction with Auckland architects Gummer and Ford. It is constructed from Kairuru marble with a base of Coromandel granite. The main feature is a semicircle of seven marble columns, with a marble walk leading to the entrance of the crypt. The memorial traces the design of the original fort on the site, with the dome in the centre of the memorial marking the position of a gun pit.

In 1984, it was registered as a Category 1 Historic Place by the New Zealand Historic Places Trust.

== In popular culture ==
The movie Tongan Ninja features the Massey Memorial as the place of the final fight between Tongan Ninja and Action Fighter.
