= Alison Sleigh =

New Zealand architect

- Born: Alison Sleigh; 1898; Dunedin
- Died: 1972 (aged 73–74); England
- Occupation: Architect
- Spouse: John Chiene (Jock) Shepherd
- Buildings: Shakespeare Memorial Theatre, Stratford

Alison Shepherd (née Sleigh; 8 March 1898 – 1972), was a New Zealand architect practising in England. She was likely the first New Zealand woman to attain membership of the Royal Institute of British Architects. She contributed to the design of the Shakespeare Memorial Theatre in Stratford, and is known especially for her line-drawings in Edward Gunn's Regency Houses series, and in John Summerson's book Georgian London.

== Biography ==
Sleigh was born in Dunedin in 1898 but grew up in Christchurch. She was educated at the Canterbury College School of Art, and in 1919 was employed by her teacher Samuel Hurst Seager as an articled pupil. Two years later her articles were transferred to Cecil Wood's office when Seager was planning to be overseas. During this time she studied at both Canterbury College Schools of Art and Engineering.

The First New Zealand Town-Planning Conference and Exhibition was held in Wellington in 1919, and Sleigh entered a garden suburb design into competition. She was awarded a bronze medal, and her design was published, using only her surname, in New Zealand Building Progress.

Sleigh passed the intermediate examination of the NZIA in 1920, and, probably encouraged by Seager or Wood in April 1921 she moved to London to study at the Architectural Association School of Architecture. Women had been admitted there since 1917, and so Sleigh was one of the 'pioneer women students'. She was considered a talented student at the school, and Robert Atkinson, the Director of Education, wrote to Sleigh's father to request that her initial two-year stay be extended to allow her to complete the five year course of study. In 1925, she was awarded an Honourable Mention for a small museum design in RIBA's Tite Prize, and in 1926 she entered a bank head office design for the Soane Medallion. The medallion was not awarded that year but due to the strength of their entries four students, including Sleigh, were exempted from the testimony of study normally required for the RIBA final exam. Sleigh was still required to pass the professional practice exam, which she did in December 1927, and in June of that year was elected ARIBA.

Sleigh worked for Howard Robertson's firm Easton & Robertson both before and after he graduation. Robertson was Principal at AA. While employed, Sleigh also produced drawings for other architectural practices, and illustrated Edwin Gunn's series Regency Houses which ran as a supplement to Architect and Building News between 1932 and 1935.

Sleigh married architect John Chiene Shepherd, known as Jock, in February 1928. They had worked together with Elisabeth Scott on the winning entry for the design of the Shakespeare Memorial Theatre in Stratford, and became engaged while doing so. After the win, Scott formed a partnership with Maurice Chesterton and the Shepherds to complete the theatre. Alison Sleigh is believed to have worked specifically on the spiral staircase.

Sleigh gave birth to a son in 1934 and soon after returned to work, partnering for a short while with Janet Fletcher, another AA 'pioneer woman student'. Sleigh then worked for Scott, Chesterton & Shepherd from 1936. In 1938 the Shepherds designed Pond House in Stoke Row, Henley-on-Thames for themselves. During this time the firm worked on the Wharrie Cabman's Shelter, the Fawcett Building at Newnham College in Cambridge, and two infant schools.

During the Second World War, Jock Shepherd served in the army, and Sleigh took in five evacuee children, with the support of her nanny and a cook. During this period she drew the illustrations for John Summerson's Georgian London, published in 1945. From 1943 to 1945 she also worked for the National Buildings Record (NBR), of which Summerson was the deputy director. The NBR listed and recorded heritage buildings that were under threat of destruction or demolition, and Sleigh's work included measuring, drawing, and photographing the buildings. Jock joined Alison in the work when he returned after the war, and both continued until their retirement in 1957.

Sleigh died in England in 1972, never having returned to New Zealand.
