= Christchurch Municipal Chambers =

Heritage-listed building in Christchurch, New Zealand

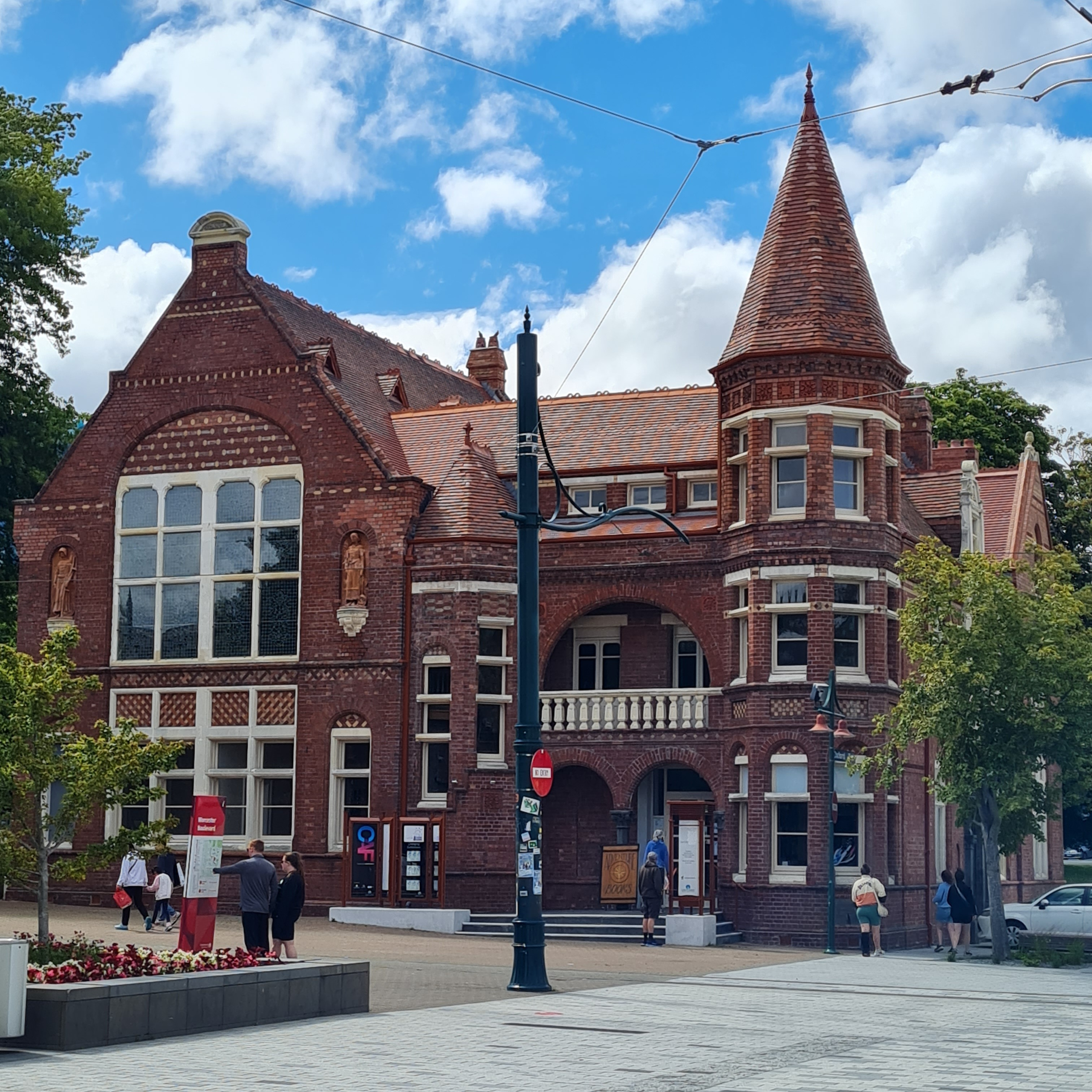
- Christchurch Municipal Chambers in 2025
- Former names: Civic offices, Our City

General information
- Type: Former civic offices
- Location: Christchurch Central City, 159 Oxford Terrace, Christchurch, New Zealand
- Coordinates: 43.5308°S 172.6336°E
- Construction started: 1886
- Inaugurated: 24 March 1887
- Client: Christchurch City Council

Technical details
- Floor count: two

Design and construction
- Architect: Samuel Hurst Seager

Heritage New Zealand – Category 1
- Reference no.: 1844

References
- "Municipal Chambers (Former)". New Zealand Heritage List/Rārangi Kōrero. Heritage New Zealand.

The Municipal Chambers, previously known as Our City, is a Queen Anne style building on the corner of Worcester Street and Oxford Terrace in the Christchurch Central City. It is a Category I heritage building registered with Heritage New Zealand. From 1887 to 1924 it was used by Christchurch City Council as their civic offices, providing room for meetings of the council and for housing staff, before they moved to the Civic. It was then used for many decades by the Canterbury Chamber of Commerce and served as the main tourist information. It was last used as an exhibition and events centre before being damaged in the Christchurch earthquakes. It is due to be reopened in June 2024.

== History ==
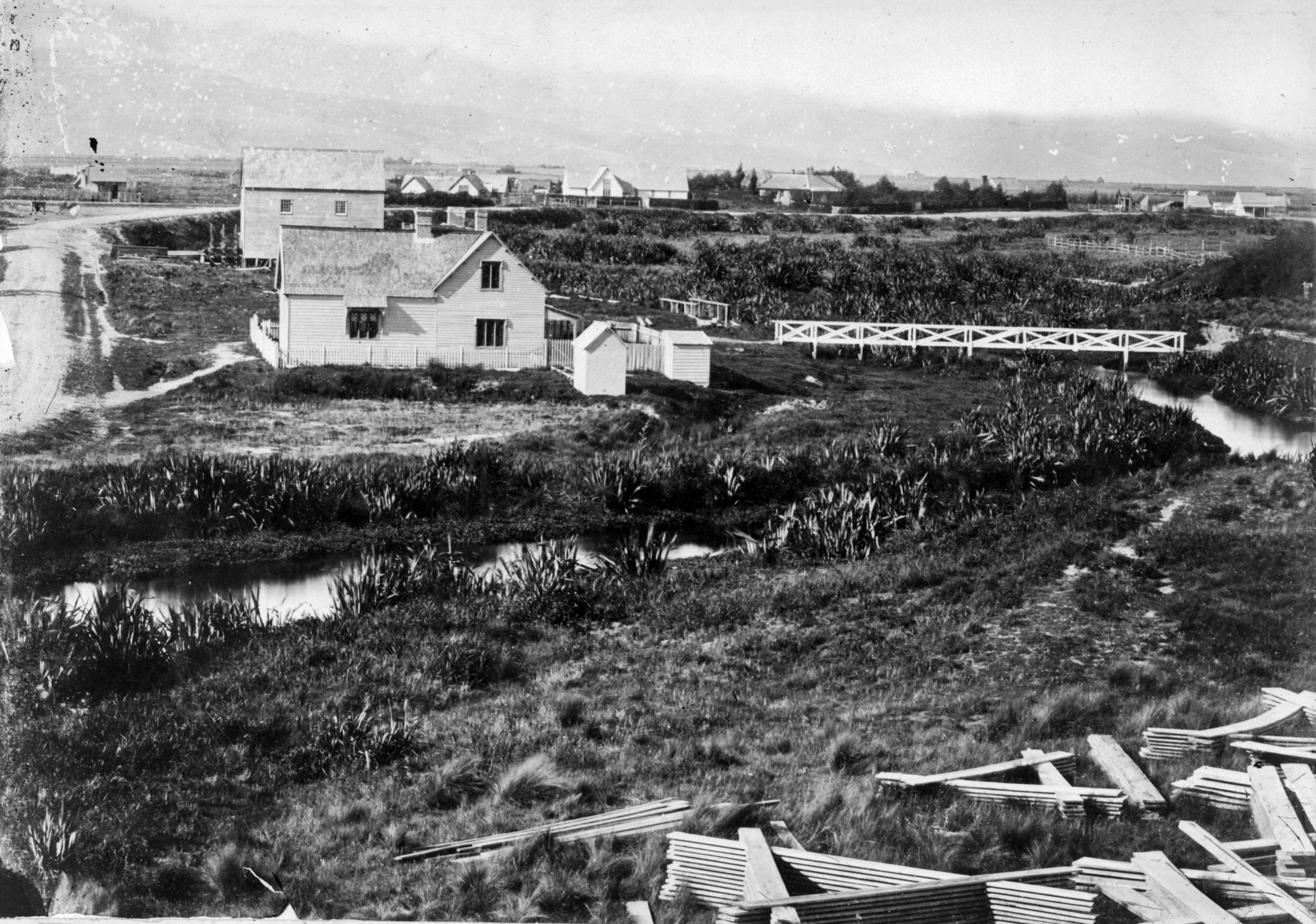
The Christchurch Land Office (foreground) in 1860

=== Civic offices ===
The Christchurch Municipal Council first met in 1862. Later that year, it became the Christchurch City Council. The council used Christchurch's first public building, the Christchurch Land Office, as their meeting venue and for housing council employees. The Land Office was built in 1851 on Oxford Terrace on the banks of the Avon River, just north of where the Worcester Street bridge crossed the river. The building had various public uses. It was built on Reserve 10, which was a section of land reserved for public buildings.

In 1879, the council administration had run out of room in the Land Office, and a competition for new civic offices and a town hall (i.e. a venue for large gatherings) for what is later known as Victoria Square was announced. After all the competition entries proved too expensive, the project was abandoned.

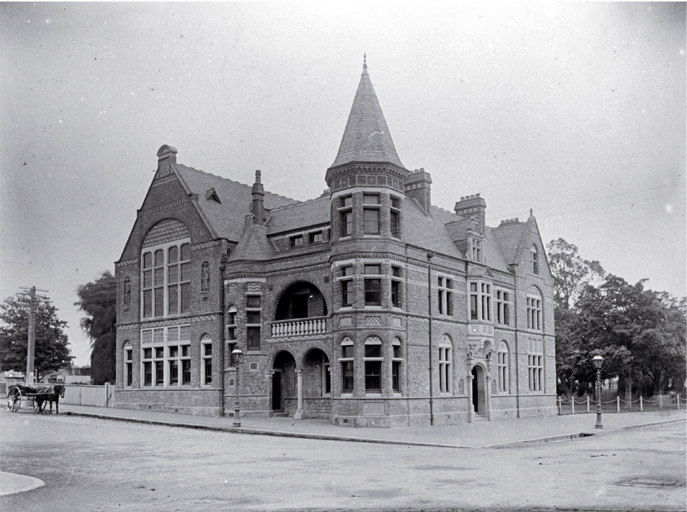
Civic offices in 1890

Another competition was called for in 1885, this time for just civic offices (i.e. for a council meeting venue and for staff), and on the same site as the Land Office. Controversy erupted when the competition was won by Samuel Hurst Seager; he was young and relatively inexperienced, and his design in Queen Anne style was an architectural type unfamiliar to New Zealand. Construction began in 1886, but the controversy continued when councillor Samuel Paull Andrews claimed the building was structurally unsound. Benjamin Mountfort and John Whitelaw, both architects, and Edward Dobson, an engineer, reviewed the design and the building and found everything to be safe. The only suggestion they made was to strengthen the roof in a different, more costly way than designed by Seager. The building was completed on 24 March 1887 and council met for the first time in their new premises on 4 April 1887. The south façade of the building has two terracotta sculptures by George Frampton that represent 'Industry' and 'Concord'.

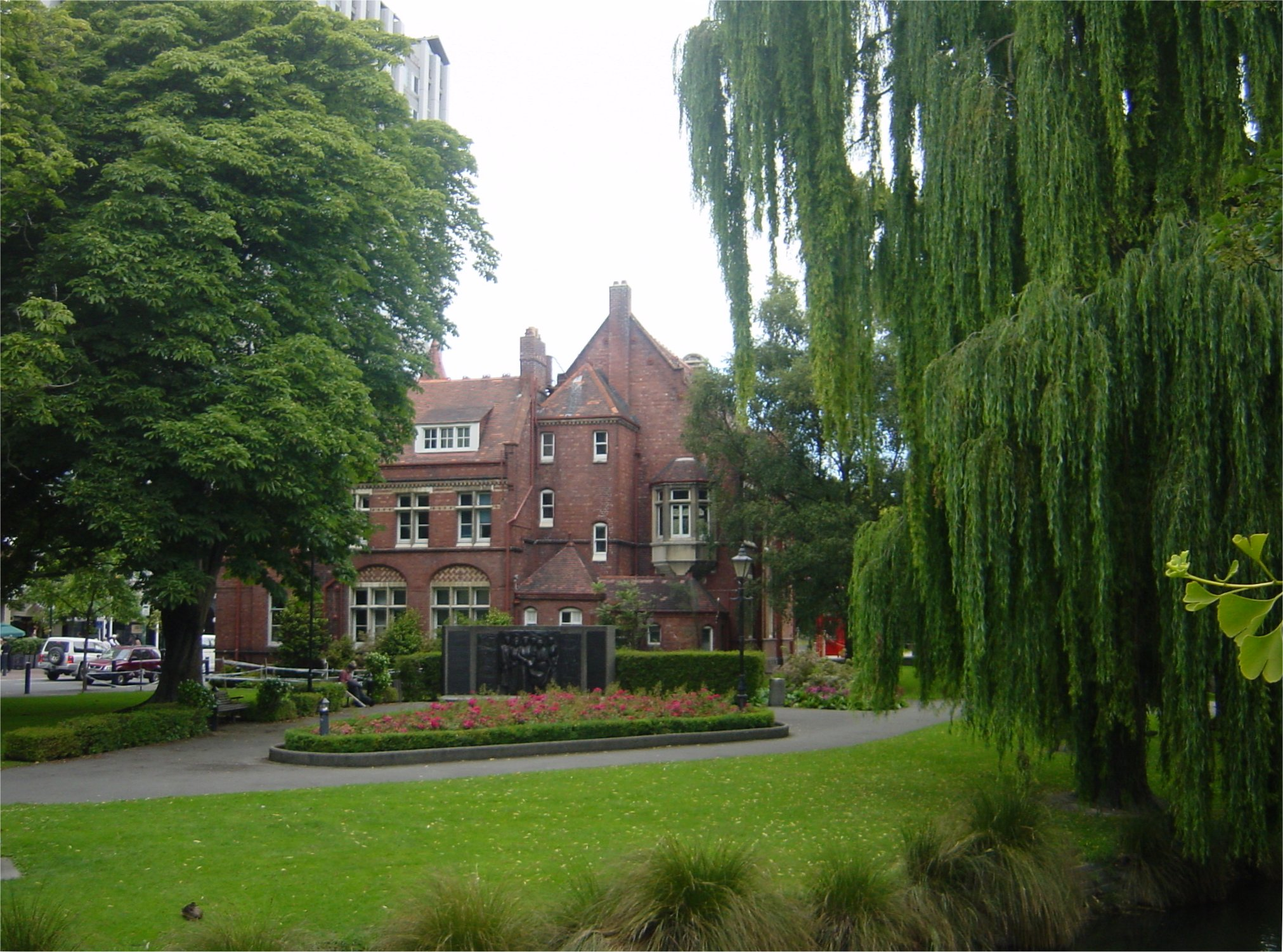
The gardens at the rear of the Municipal Chambers, January 2007

In 1919, Council concluded that their premises were once again too cramped and started looking for an alternative. A bill was put to Parliament, seeking permission to extend the building to the north of Reserve 10 on land designated for public gardens or promenades, but public opposition was too strong and the proposal was dropped. Instead, Council purchased the burned out shell of the northern half of the Agricultural and Industrial Hall in 1920. Construction started in 1922, and the new offices, now known as the Civic, opened on 1 September 1924. In 2010, council moved into their fifth civic office; to date, the Queen Anne design is the only purpose built civic offices in Christchurch.

In the late 1920s the building was damaged by a fire, after an ash can set fire to the back staircase. There were no fire escapes on the building at the time, so the custodian and his family had to be rescued from the roof. Fire escapes were later added.

=== Other uses ===
Parliament passed a Christchurch Municipal Offices Leasing Act in 1922, which allowed council to lease the building that was situated on Reserve 10. The Canterbury Chamber of Commerce took the lease and held it until 1987. Part of the building was subleased to the Canterbury Promotion Council, later known as Christchurch and Canterbury Marketing, and they were in the building until October 2000. Part of their function was to provide the main tourist information centre for Christchurch.

The building was taken over again by the council and opened as an exhibition, event and meeting space for the community in July 2002, branded as Our City O-Tautahi. It is one of Christchurch's major tourist attractions.

=== Earthquake damage ===
Our City was damaged in the 2010 Canterbury earthquake and was closed, with heavy bracing installed around the building. The building is insured for NZ$5.8m, but repair options are in excess of that. One of the options has been estimated at NZ$10.5m.

In April 2024 the scaffolding was removed from around the building.

== Gallery ==
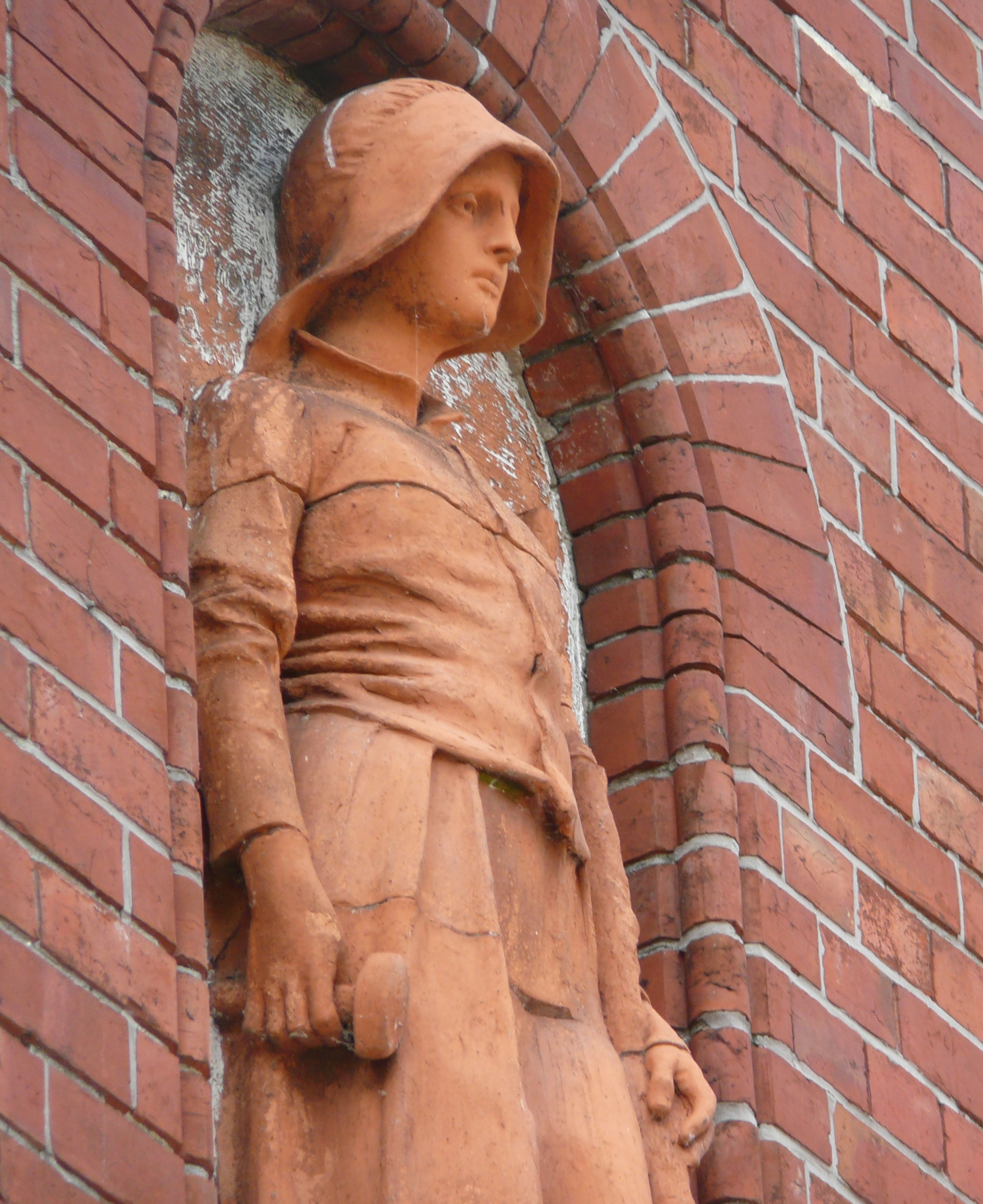
'Industry' sculpture by George Frampton

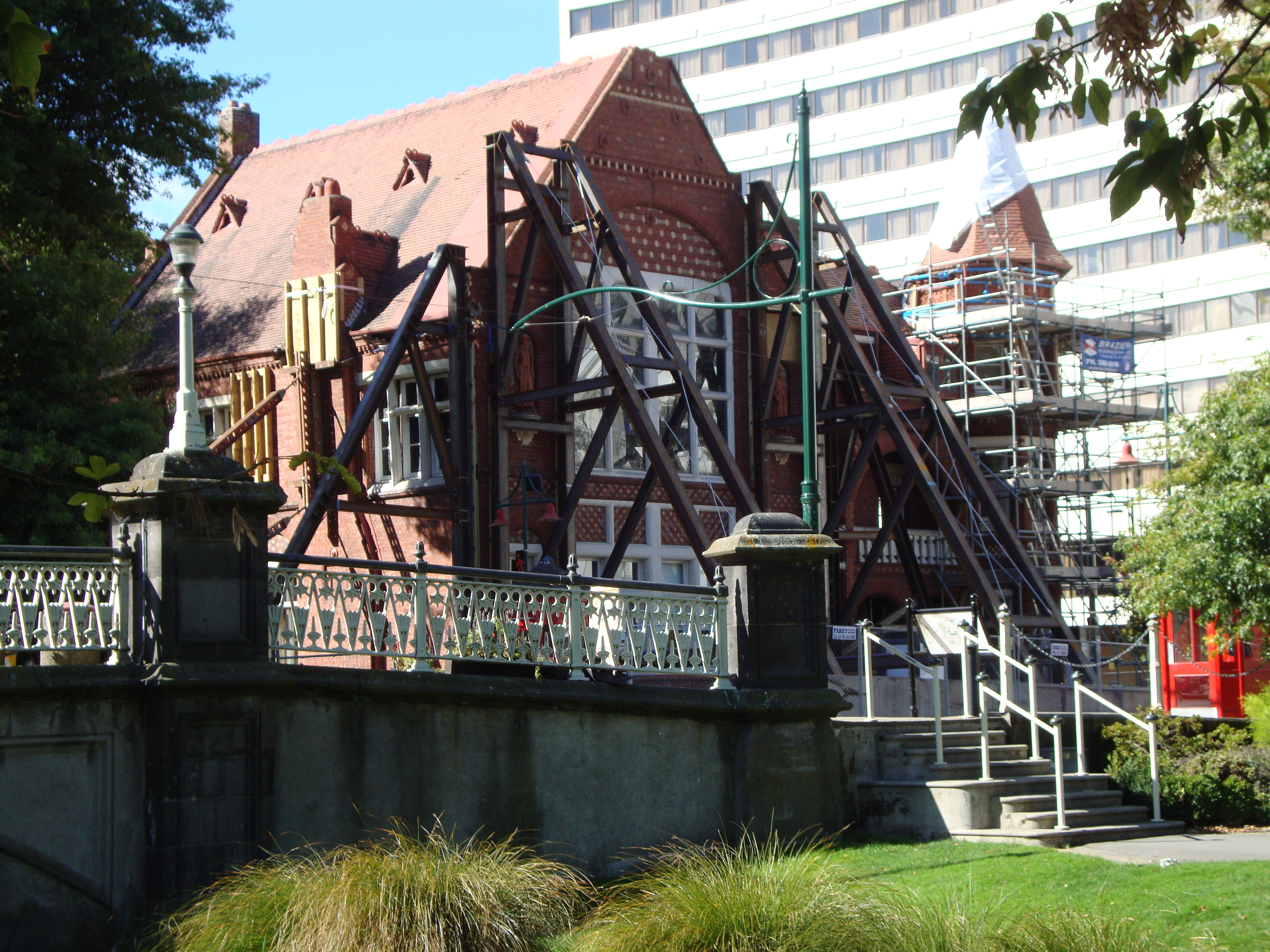
Our City with heavy bracing following the 2010 Canterbury earthquake in March 2011

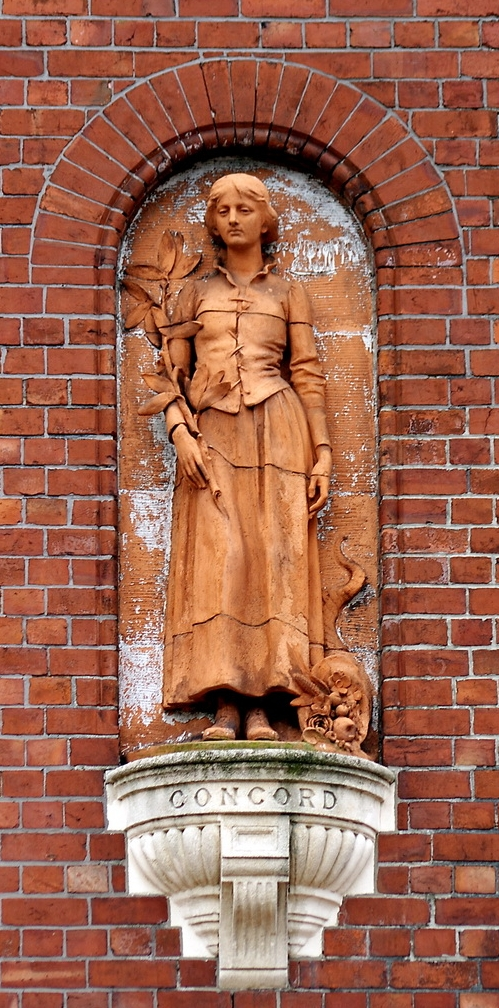
'Concord' sculpture by George Frampton

== Heritage listing ==
On 2 April 1985, the building was registered by the New Zealand Historic Places Trust (now called Heritage New Zealand) as a Category I historic place, with the registration number being 1844. It is a rare example of the Queen Anne style, and at the time was a notable departure from the prevailing Gothic architecture. It was the first major commission for Seager and started his career. The building is a feature in its part of the city.

== See also ==
- List of oldest buildings in Christchurch
