= The Civic, Christchurch =

Building in Christchurch, New Zealand

The Civic
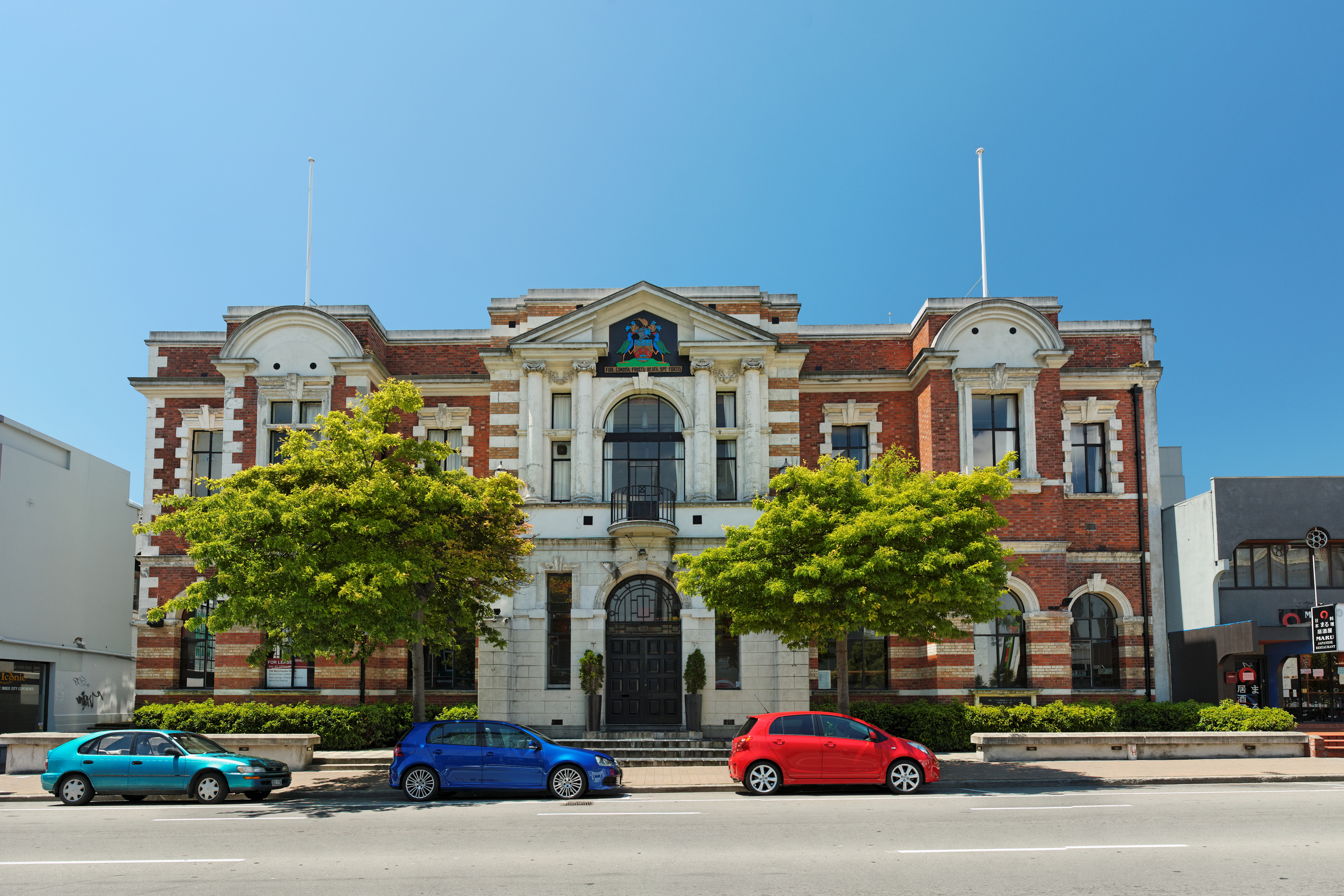
- The Civic in 2009

General information
- Location: Christchurch Central City, 194–198 Manchester Street, Christchurch, New Zealand
- Coordinates: 43.5303°S 172.6399°E
- Construction started: 14 March 1900
- Inaugurated: 1 November 1900
- Renovated: 1922–1924
- Demolished: 2011
- Client: Christchurch City Council

Technical details
- Floor count: two

Design and construction
- Architecture firm: Clarkson & Ballantyne
- Main contractor: Rennie and Pearce

Renovating team
- Architects: Greenstreet and Anderson
- Renovating firm: W. Williamson

Heritage New Zealand – Category 2
- Designated: 26-Nov-1981
- Reference no.: 1870

References
- "Civic". New Zealand Heritage List/Rārangi Kōrero. Heritage New Zealand.

The Civic was a building in Manchester Street, central Christchurch, that was erected in 1900 and demolished in 2011. It was first used as an exhibition hall, then as a cinema, and then a theatre, before being gutted by fire in 1917. The northern part of the building was purchased by Christchurch City Council (CCC) and opened as the civic office in 1924, and served this purpose until 1980. After that it had several uses, including a restaurant, bar and live music venue. The building was heavily damaged in the February 2011 Christchurch earthquake, and was demolished.

The Civic was a Category II heritage building registered with the New Zealand Historic Places Trust.

== History ==
=== Agricultural and Industrial Hall ===
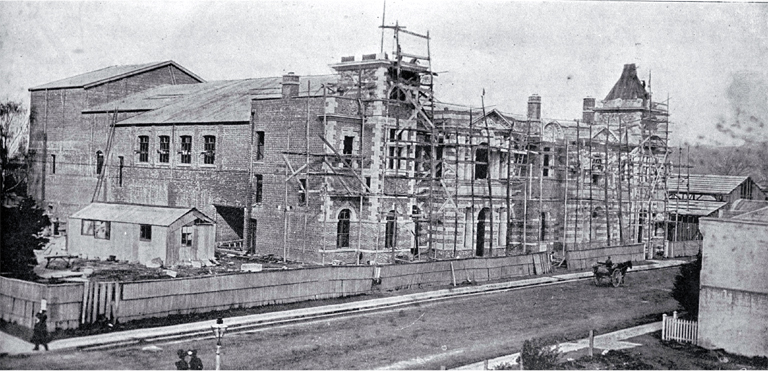
Construction of the Agricultural and Industrial Hall in 1900

The Agricultural and Industrial Hall, also known as the Canterbury Hall, was built in 1900 at 192–194 Manchester Street. The foundation stone was laid by Mayor William Reece on 14 March 1900. William Clarkson and Robert Ballantyne, architects trading as Clarkson & Ballantyne, designed the building for the 50th jubilee of Christchurch, celebrating the arrival of the First Four Ships in December 1850. The contractors were Rennie and Pearce. The Canterbury Industrial Association, a branch of the New Zealand Industrial Association, was the driving force behind the building. Together with the Agricultural and Pastoral Association, an Agricultural and Industrial Hall Company was formed that owned the building. Samuel Brown, the president of the New Zealand Industrial Association, called it "possibly the finest hall in New Zealand".

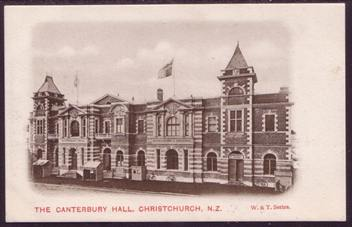
Canterbury Hall prior to burning down in 1917

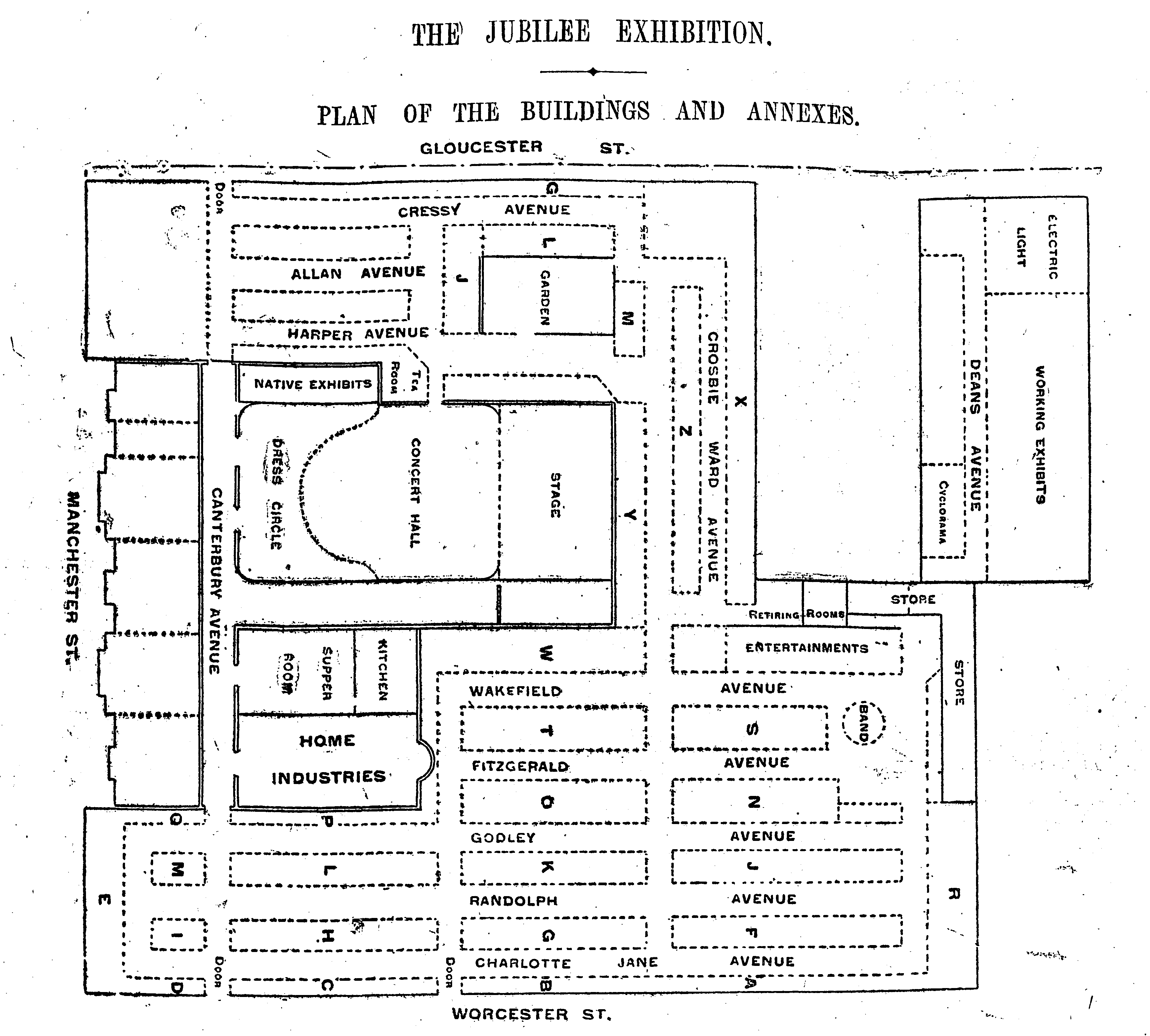
Plan for the jubilee exhibition

The building was formally opened on 1 November 1900 by the Mayoress, Mrs Reece. Later that afternoon, the Governor, The Earl of Ranfurly, opened the jubilee exhibition. The Premier's party consisted of Richard Seddon, Joseph Ward and families. The day was declared as a public holiday from noon.

The exhibition covered 74,000 square feet (6,900 m^{2}) and took up two-thirds of the city block described by Manchester, Gloucester, Worcester Streets and Latimer Square. It closed on 31 January 1901, having been visited by nearly 250,000 people, with a surplus of £3000.

=== His Majesty's Theatre ===
The Canterbury Hall was then used as a cinema, seating 3,000. In 1906, the building was converted to a theatre with a seating capacity of 1,400, and the name was changed to His Majesty's Theatre. The remodelled building was opened with the premier of the comic opera Erminie on 28 August 1906. Fuller's leased the theatre for a period of ten years in early 1917, but tragedy struck on 11 November of that year when the building was gutted by fire. The building, valued at £21,000, was lost, with only the façade left standing. The city organ, which was donated by the Government after the 1906 New Zealand International Exhibition, valued at £5,000 and insured for £3,750 was also consumed by the flames. The building had only recently been offered to the Christchurch City Council as a town hall.

=== Municipal offices ===
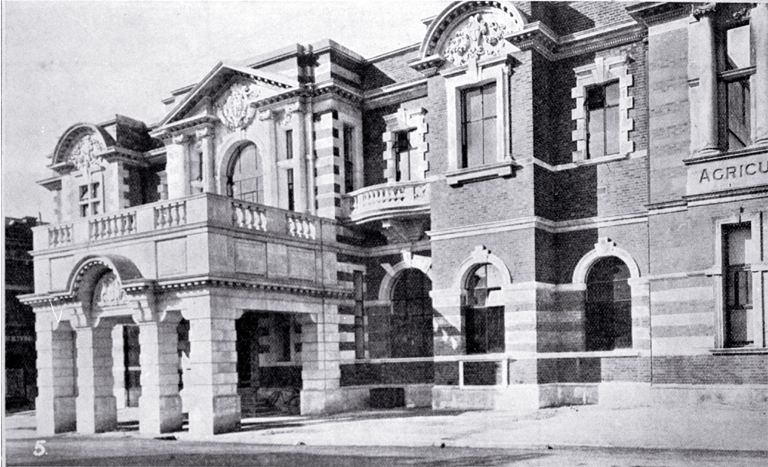
The Civic in 1925 with a portico

Christchurch City Council started looking for new civic offices in 1919, as the existing offices, these days known as Our City, had become too small. CCC bought the northern part (194 Manchester Street) of the burned out shell in 1920 for their new municipal offices.

The southern half of the old building at 192 Manchester Street opened as the Civic Theatre on 17 March 1928. C. R. Dawe and Francis Willis were the architects for the theatre. That building was demolished in 1983, truncating the impressive 1900 façade by half.

Greenstreet and Anderson were engaged as architects for the civic offices, and W. Williamson was engaged as a builder in 1922. Monica Thacker, the mayoress, laid the foundation stone. The building was opened on 1 September 1924. The design was based on an American banking chamber, where one continuous desk in the form of a horseshoe in the main hall gave access for the public to every department of the council.

External image
- The horseshoe shaped customer desk in the Civic in 1979

An imposing portico was built over the footpath, but this was later demolished.

All council staff (apart from specialist services like the electricity department) were once again under one roof, but this lasted only until 1943. With an increase in the number of staff, and other municipalities amalgamating with Christchurch City Council, council started housing some staff in other buildings. By 1978, council staff were in nine different buildings.

The new Christchurch Town Hall was built in Kilmore Street, over the Avon River from Victoria Square, and opened in 1972. Part II of this civic area were supposed to be new civic offices as a replacement for the building in Manchester Street. It was envisaged to build on the corner of Kilmore and Durham Streets, cutting Victoria Street off from going through Victoria Square, but this scheme did not proceed. Instead, the city council purchased Miller's Department Store in Tuam Street in 1978 and fitted this building out as the new civic offices, occupying the building in 1980. The City Council sold the Civic in 1982 for $760,000.

=== Post 1982 ===
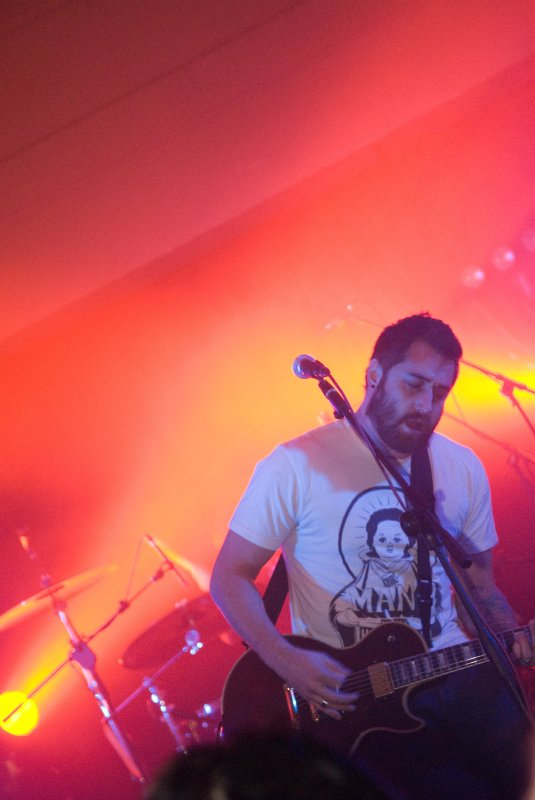
Elemeno P performing at the Civic

The Civic has had several owners and different uses. In 1984, it was the Civic Regency Restaurant. It was renamed the Civic in 1986 and was a bar, and then served as a live music venue, with acts by Salmonella Dub, The Black Keys, Shapeshifter, Elemeno P and Anika Moa. It also hosted nighttime performances of the annual buskers festival. The Civic stopped hosting music events in 2009.

=== Demise ===
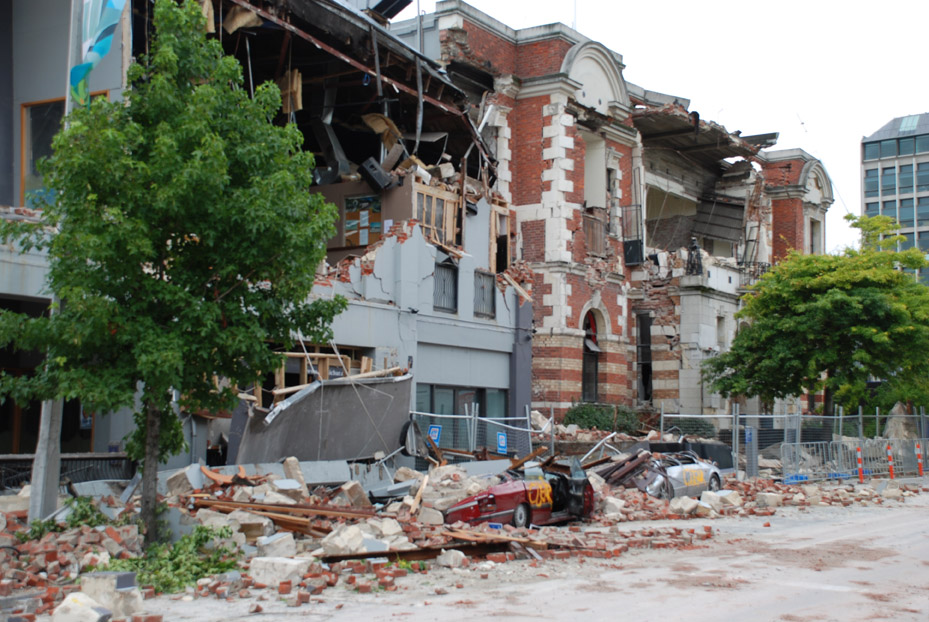
The collapsed façade of the Civic after the February 2011 Christchurch earthquake

The Civic was heavily damaged in the February 2011 Christchurch earthquake. Much of the façade collapsed into Manchester Street. The building was demolished in 2011.

Following the earthquake, a time capsule was found in the building. It was opened on 12 April 2011 by mayor Bob Parker, together with two further capsules found in the plinth of the toppled Godley Statue. The time capsule from the Civic contained newspapers, a book with photos and the council's balance sheet and statements for the year ended 31 March 1921.

== Heritage listing ==
On 26 November 1981, the building was registered by the New Zealand Historic Places Trust as a Category II historic place, with the registration number being 1870.
