= Samuel Hurst Seager =

New Zealand builder, draftsman, architect, town planner, photographer (1885–1933)

Samuel Hurst Seager CBE
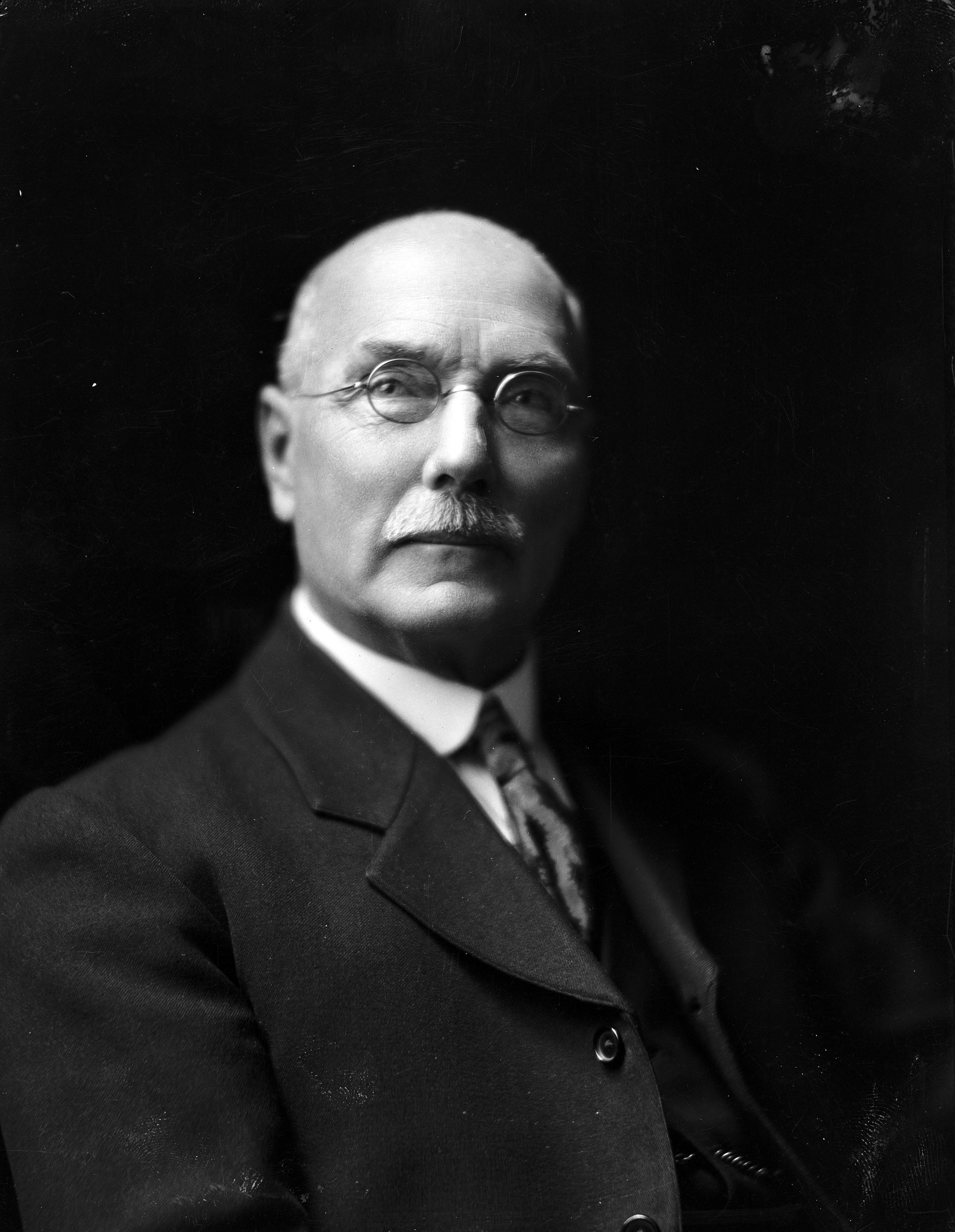
- Seager in 1926
- Born: 26 June 1855; London, England
- Died: 5 October 1933 (aged 78); Sydney, New South Wales, Australia
- Occupation: Architect
- Buildings: Daresbury; Christchurch Municipal Chambers

Samuel Hurst Seager CBE (26 June 1855 – 5 October 1933) was a notable New Zealand builder, draftsman, architect and town planner. He was born in London, England, in 1855, and as a boy emigrated to Christchurch, New Zealand, with his parents in 1870.

He was one of the pioneers of the New Zealand bungalow. He purchased land on Clifton Hill in Sumner and designed and established a garden suburb with eight bungalows which were sold in 1914. Seager resided at No.1 The Spur for eight years from 1902.

Two of his notable buildings are Daresbury at 67 Fendalton Road and the Christchurch Municipal Chambers.

In the 1926 King's Birthday Honours, he was appointed a Commander of the Order of the British Empire.

== Gallery of his work ==
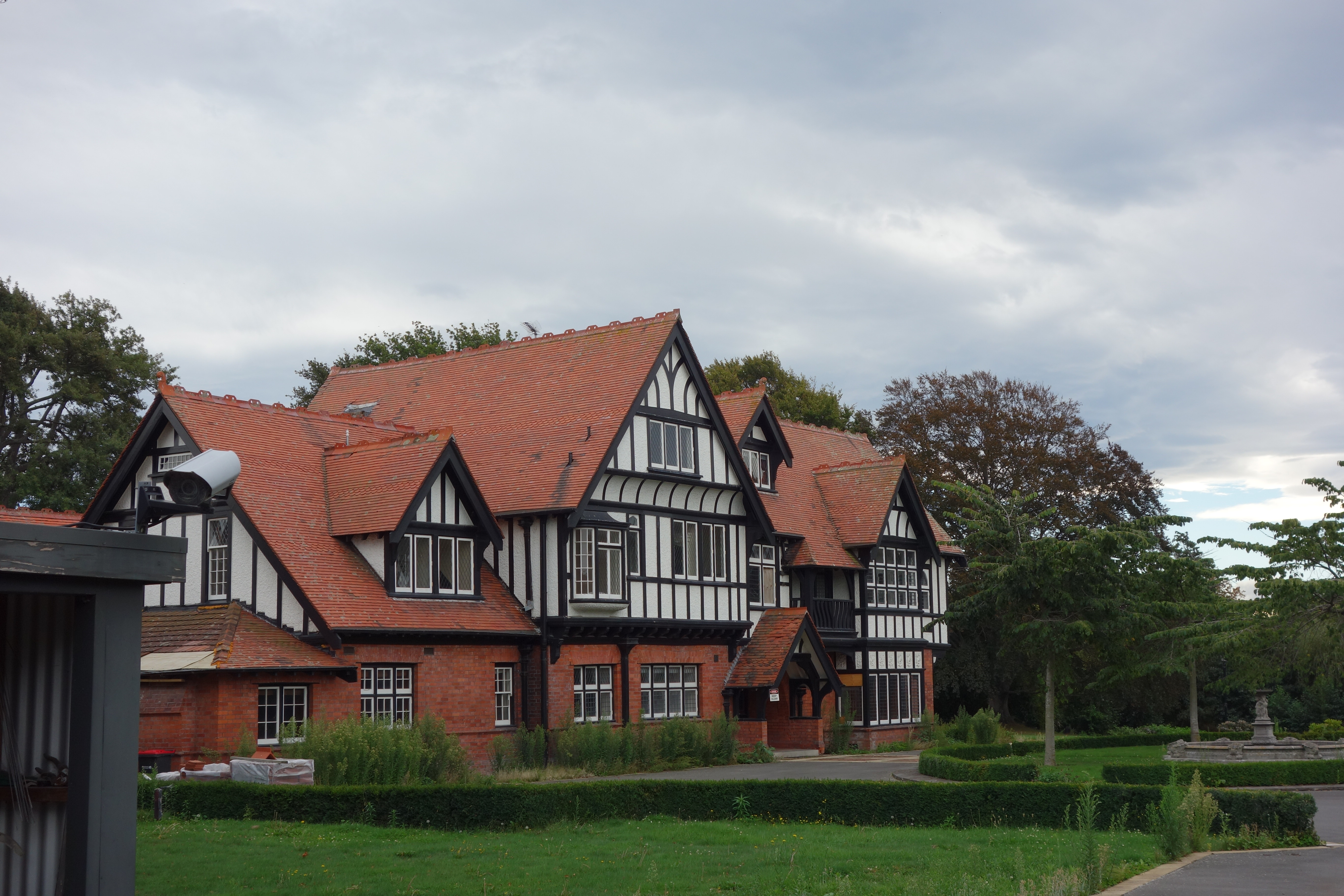
Daresbury in Christchurch

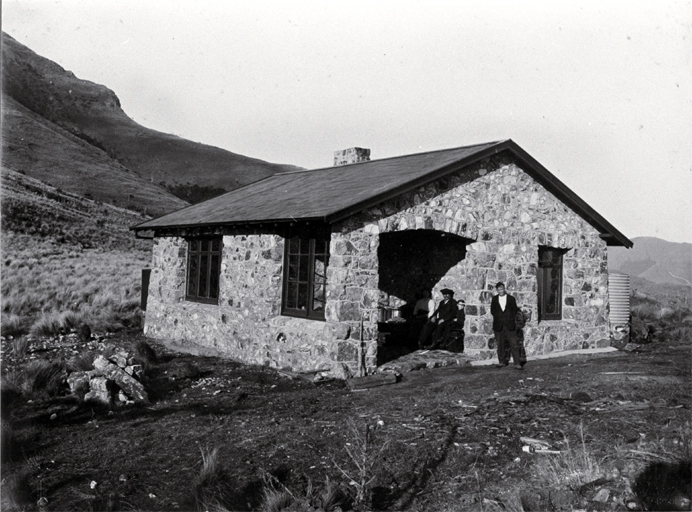
Sign of the Packhorse on the summit road (Christchurch)

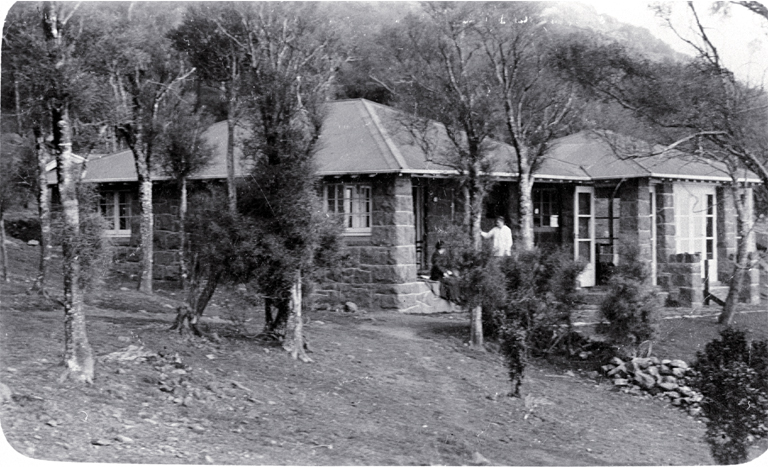
Sign of the Bellbird on the summit road (Christchurch)

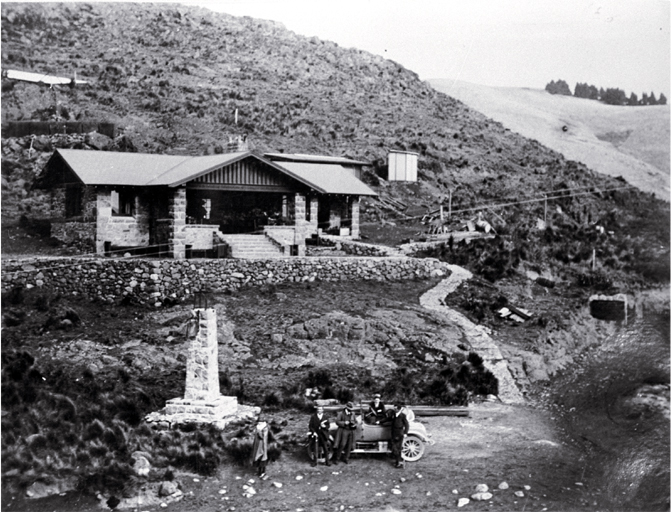
Sign of the Kiwi on the summit road (Christchurch)

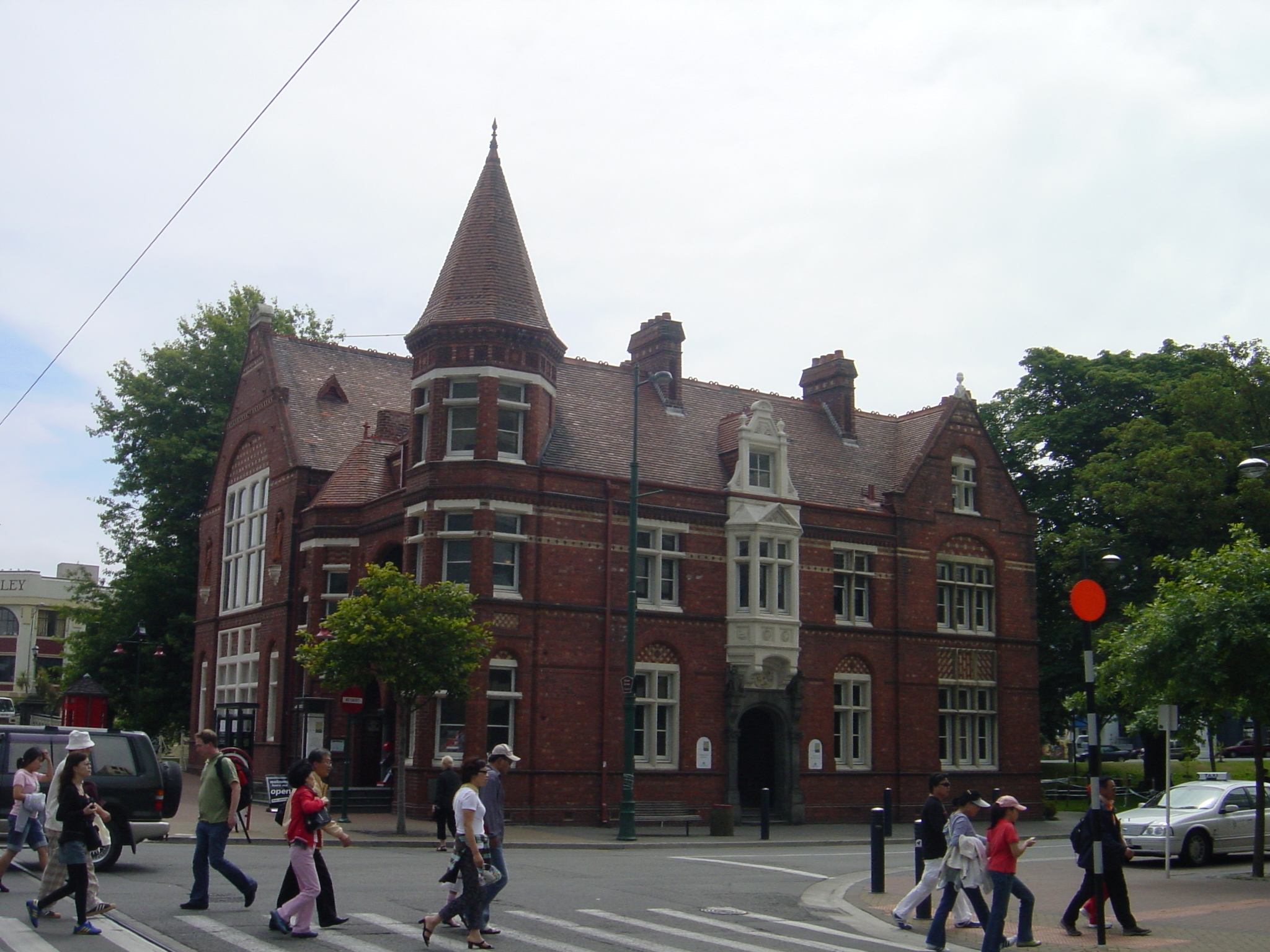
Christchurch Municipal Chambers

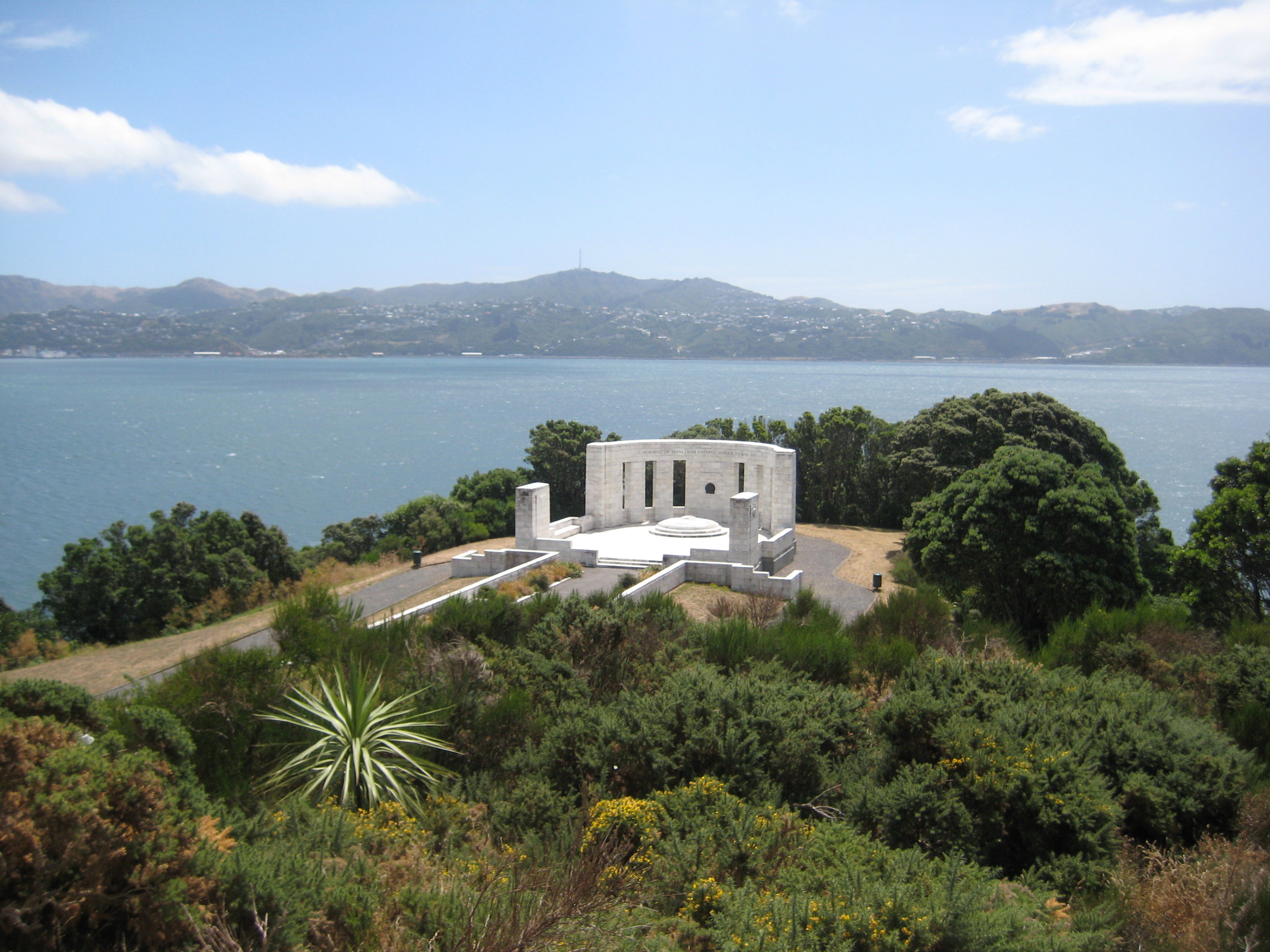
Massey Memorial, Wellington

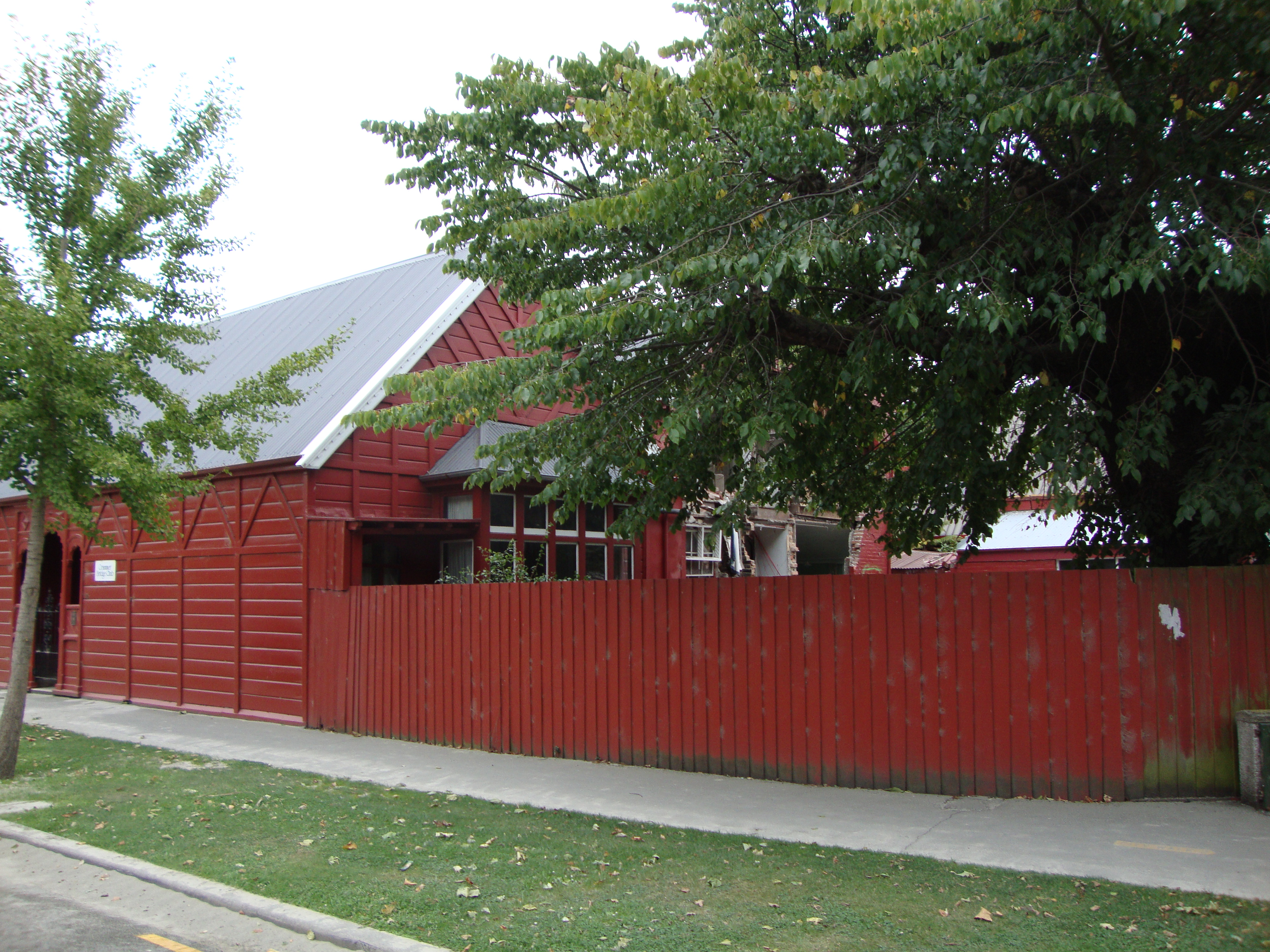
Cranmer Bridge Club, Christchurch

== See also ==
- Alison Sleigh
