= Opheliminae =

Scientific classification
- Domain: Eukaryota
- Kingdom: Animalia
- Phylum: Arthropoda
- Class: Insecta
- Order: Hymenoptera
- Family: Eulophidae
- Subfamily: Opheliminae; Westwood

Genera
- Australsecodes Girault, 1928; Ophelimus Haliday, 1844

Subfamily of wasps

Opheliminae is a subfamily of the chalcid wasp family Eulophidae which consist of two genera and 56 species.
