= Elisabeth Scott =

British architect

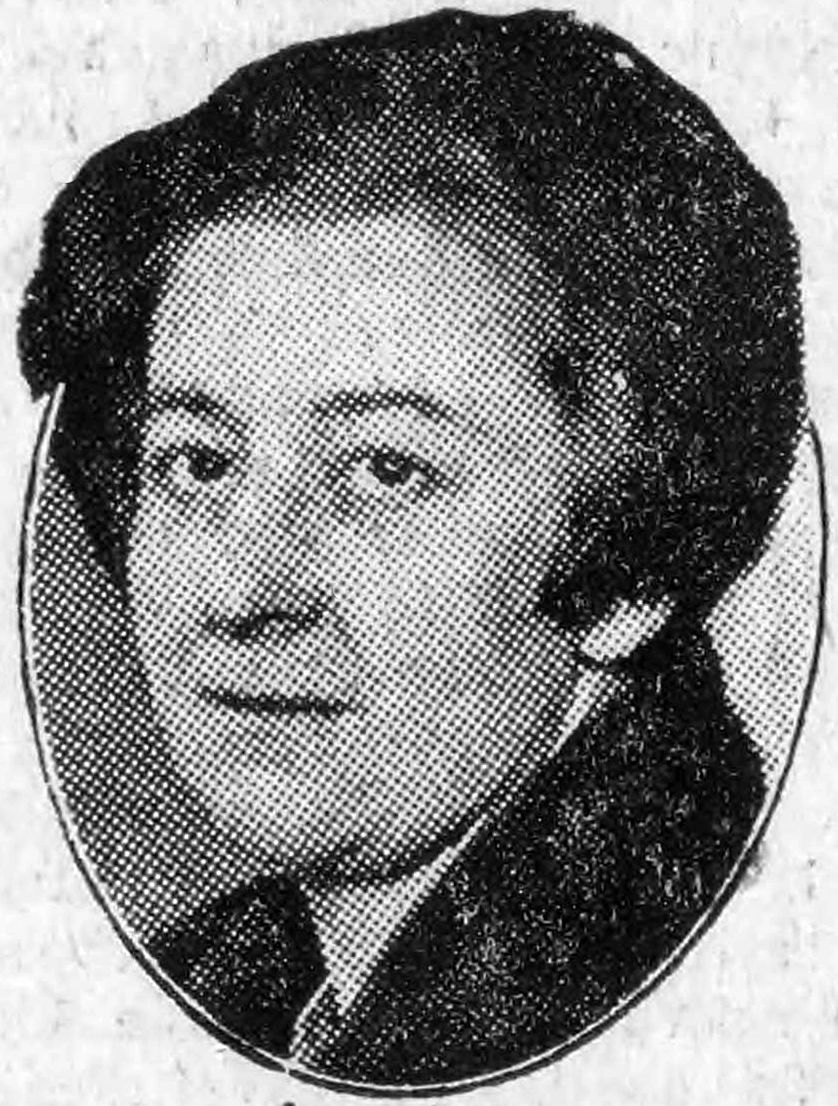
Portrait of architect Elisabeth Scott, 1928.

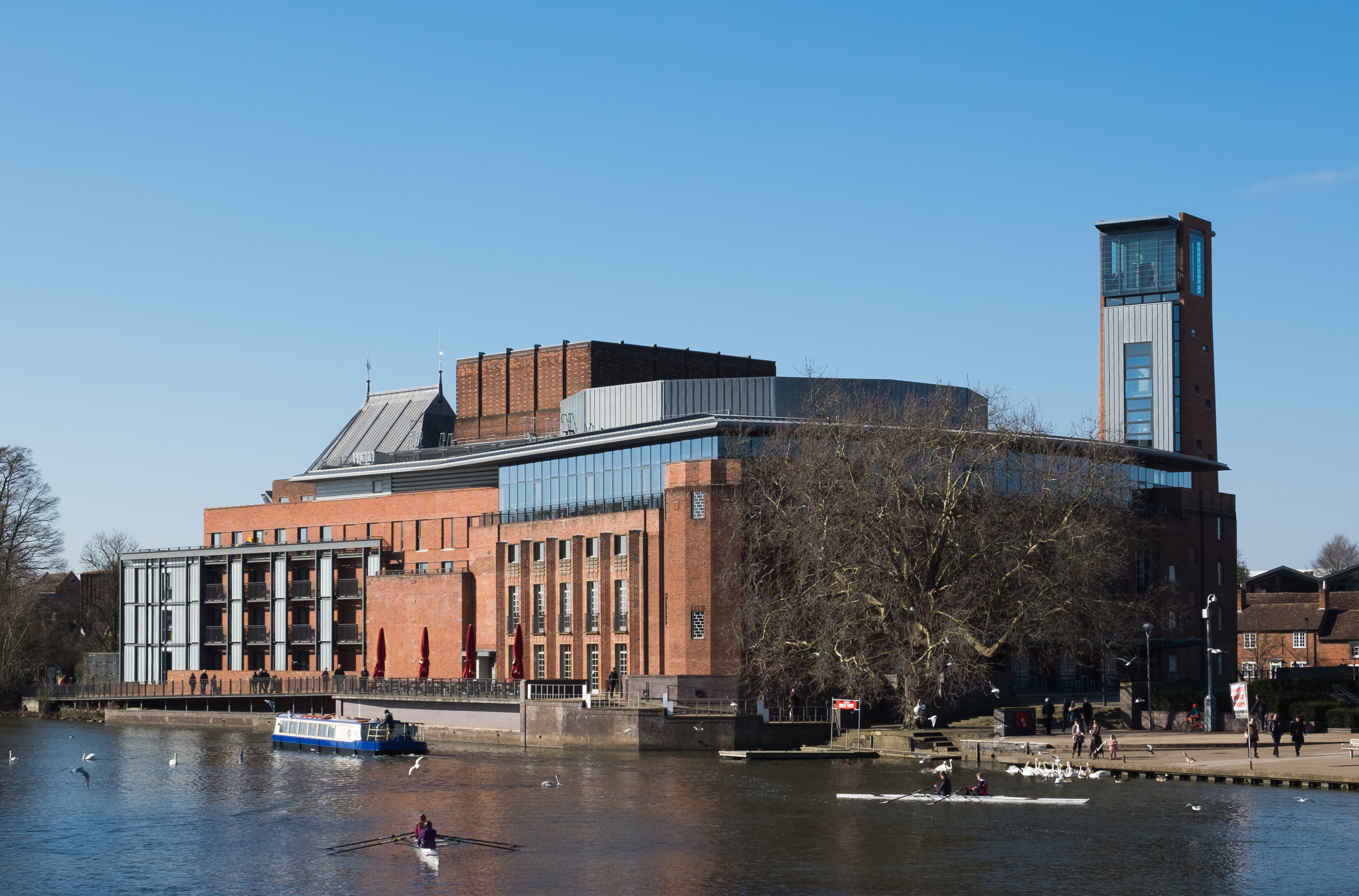
Royal Shakespeare Theatre

Elisabeth Whitworth Scott (20 September 1898 – 19 June 1972) was a British architect who designed the Shakespeare Memorial Theatre at Stratford-upon-Avon, England. This was the first important public building in Britain to be designed by a female architect.

== Early life ==
Scott was born in Bournemouth, England, one of ten children of Bernard Scott, a surgeon. She was a great-niece of the architects George Gilbert Scott and George Frederick Bodley and second cousin of Giles Gilbert Scott, the architect of Liverpool Cathedral. She was educated at home until the age of fourteen, when she enrolled at the Redmoor School, Bournemouth. In 1919, she became one of the early students at the Architectural Association's new school in Bedford Square, London, graduating in 1924.

== Career ==
Scott's first position was with the architects David Niven and Herbert Wigglesworth, a practice specialising in the Scandinavian style. In turn she became an assistant to Louis de Soissons, a progressive architect producing buildings in the contemporary style for the new garden city of Welwyn, Hertfordshire (where she worked on the design for the Shredded Wheat Factory, now a listed building) and the modernist Oliver Hill.

=== Shakespeare Memorial Theatre ===
In 1927, a competition for a replacement to the burnt-out Shakespeare Memorial Theatre was announced and Scott entered, with a confidence in her own abilities taken from the sound theoretical grounding at the Architectural Association's school. At the time, she was working for Maurice Chesterton's practice at Hampstead, London, and Chesterton agreed to oversee her proposals for feasibility. (Maurice Chesterton was a cousin of the theatre's publicist A.K. Chesterton.) Maurice Chesterton's daughter Elizabeth Chesterton, herself an architect, claimed in a late interview that the competition entry had been falsely "submitted under Scott's name", suggesting that all research into the practical requirements of theatre function had been her father's. Maurice Chesterton himself "disclaimed any personal share whatever in the successful design". Scott was assisted by two fellow AA students: Alison Sleigh and John Chiene Shepherd. On winning the competition (against seventy-one other entries) the four formed a partnership to prepare the detailed plans and supervise the construction.

The reaction to Scott's design was mixed. The Manchester Guardian suggested that, although the design reflected the building's purpose, its bulk in the small town was "startling...monstrous [and] brutal." The Times did not agree, observing how well the building "adapt[ed] itself to the lines of the river and landscape". Sir Edward Elgar, then 75, was to be the theatre's new musical director but, after visiting the building, he so was furiously angry with that "awful female" and her "unspeakably ugly and wrong" design that he would have nothing further to do with it, refusing even to go inside. On the other hand, dramatist George Bernard Shaw (a member of the SMT committee notwithstanding his earlier telegram of congratulations to its chairman on having the unsuitable old building burnt down) was a firm supporter of Scott's design as the only one to show any theatrical sense. Scott herself acknowledged that in her design she had not intended to conceal the functionality of the building.

Although most criticism was directed at the building's external form, in the auditorium the performers—although acknowledging that Scott had been at the mercy of her theatrical advisors: William Bridges-Adams, Barry Jackson and stage designer Norman Wilkinson (1882–1934, since 1920 a governor of the SMT)—found that it was curiously difficult to connect with their audience: evidently the large, plain expanse of the cream-painted side walls had the effect of diffusing attention from the stage. Only in 1951, when the gallery seating was extended along the sides, was this overcome. However, the building's lack of "meaningless decoration" was one of the features enthusiastically praised in the special June 1932 edition of the modernist Architectural Review.

From today's viewpoint the theatre, now called the Royal Shakespeare Theatre, is regarded as a "nationally significant building" representing the "best modern municipal style of architecture". It was made a Grade II* listed building on 14 October 1980.

=== Later practice ===
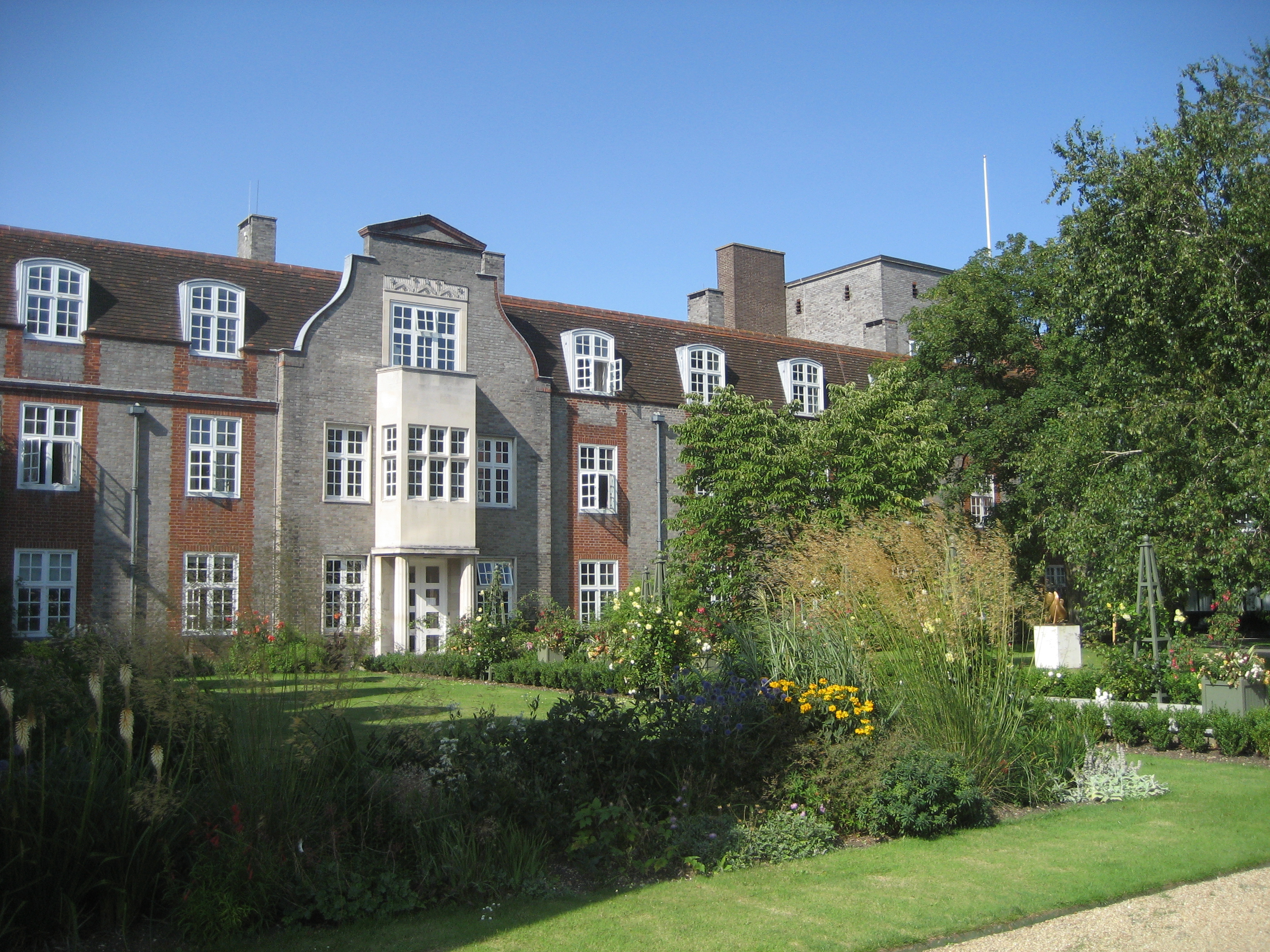
Fawcett Building, Newnham College, Cambridge

Scott was joined in the partnership by John Breakwell and—as John Shepherd and Alison Sleigh had married—the practice became "Scott, Shepherd and Breakwell". None of their subsequent commissions had the prominence of the SMT, although their 1938 work on the Fawcett Building at Newnham College, Cambridge, is of note. In the Post-war period, Scott returned to Bournemouth, working with the practice of Ronald Phillips & Partners. In the 1960s, she joined the public sector, working for Bournemouth Borough Architect's Department on such projects as the new Pavilion Theatre on Bournemouth Pier. These relatively mundane schemes were no reflection of Scott's early talent; largely forgotten, she was "unable to live up to her perceived early promise". She retired in 1968.

== Feminism ==
In 1924, when Scott entered practice, there were no prominent women architects and her selection for the project to rebuild the Shakespeare Memorial Theatre after it was destroyed by fire was only through her success in an international competition. Her achievement, and her decision to employ where possible women architects to assist her on the Stratford design, was instrumental in opening up the profession to women. Scott was not an outspoken feminist but was identified with the progressive movement to overturn traditional assumptions about women and the professions. She was by nature more of a quiet and practical feminist, ensuring that women were represented on her design projects and working through the Fawcett Society to promote wider acceptance. Above anything else, she disliked being labelled as a 'female architect' rather than simply an 'architect'. Elisabeth was a Soroptimist and an active member of Soroptimist International of Bournemouth.

== Family ==
In 1936, she married George Richards. She died in Bournemouth on 19 June 1972.

== UK passport ==
In November 2015 it was announced Elisabeth Scott would be one of only two prominent British women (the other being Ada Lovelace) to be featured in the design of the new UK passport, to be used for the next 5 years.

== See also ==
- Women in architecture

== Sources ==
- Beauman, Sally (1982). The Royal Shakespeare Company: A History of Ten Decades. Oxford, England: Oxford University Press. ISBN 0-19-212209-6.
- Pringle, Marian : The Theatres of Stratford-upon-Avon 1875 – 1992: An Architectural History, Stratford upon Avon Society (1994) ISBN 0-9514178-1-9
- Jellicoe, Geoffrey Alan (1933), The Shakespeare Memorial Theatre, Stratford-upon-Avon, Ernest Benn
- Walker, Lynne (1984), Women architects: their work, Sorella Press
