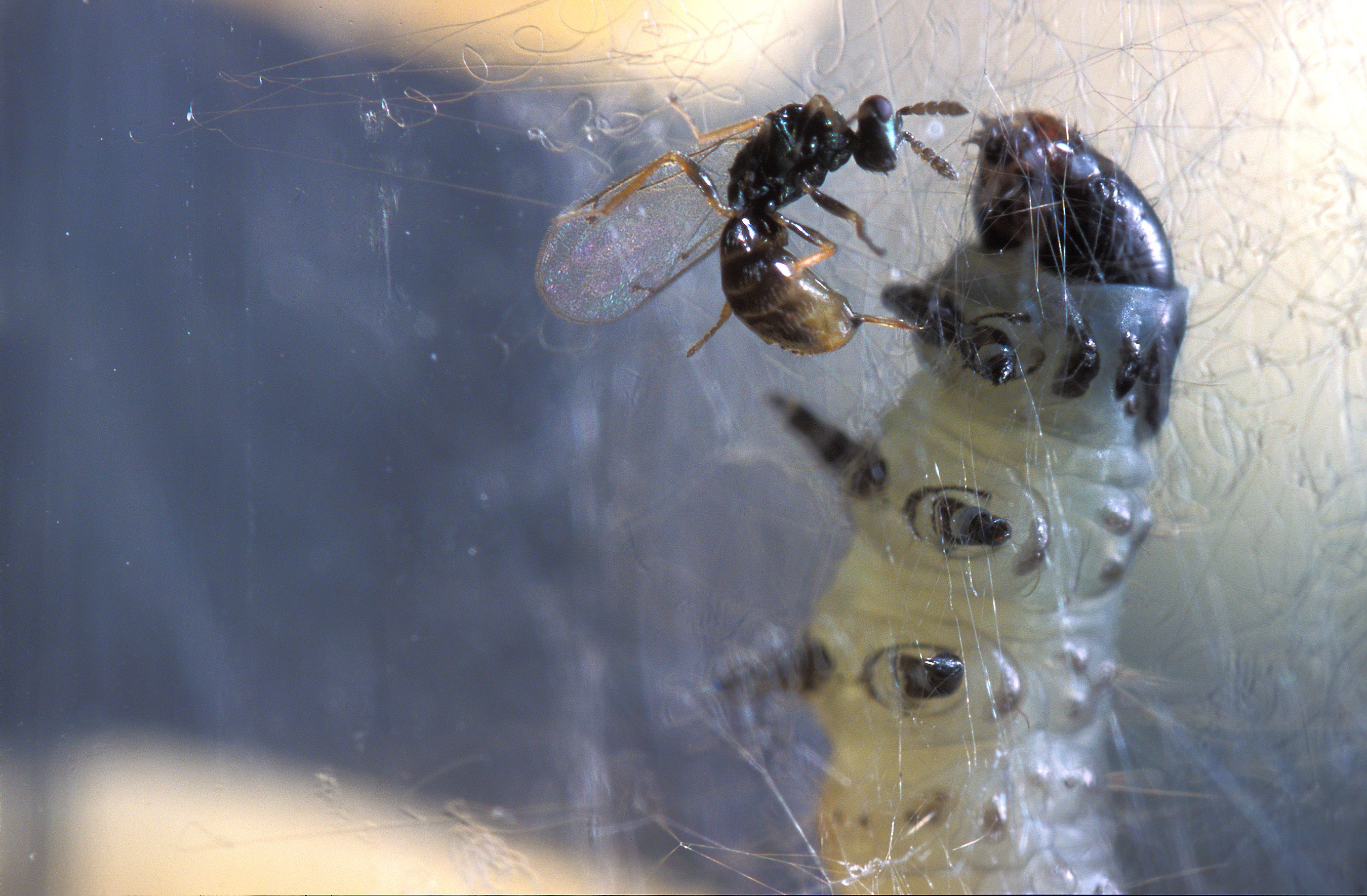
- Colpoclypeus florus

Scientific classification
- Kingdom: Animalia
- Phylum: Arthropoda
- Clade: Pancrustacea
- Class: Insecta
- Order: Hymenoptera
- Superfamily: Chalcidoidea
- Family: Eulophidae; Westwood 1829

Subfamilies
- Elasminae; Entedoninae; Entiinae; Eulophinae; Opheliminae; Tetrastichinae

Diversity
- Five subfamilies about 300 genera about 4300 species

= Eulophidae =

Eulophidae Temporal range: Ypresian–Recent

Family of wasps

The Eulophidae is a large family of hymenopteran insects, with over 4,300 described species in some 300 genera. The family includes the genus Elasmus, which used to be treated as a separate family, "Elasmidae", and is now treated as a subfamily of Eulophidae. These minute insects are challenging to study, as they deteriorate rapidly after death unless extreme care is taken (e.g., preservation in ethanol), making identification of most museum specimens difficult. The larvae of very few species feed on plants, but the majority are primary parasitoids on a huge range of arthropods at all stages of development. They are exceptional in that they are one of two hymenopteran families with some species that are known to parasitize thrips. Eulophids are found throughout the world in virtually all habitats (one is even aquatic, parasitising water-penny beetles).

Eulophids are separable from most other Chalcidoidea by the possession of only four tarsomeres on each leg, a small, straight protibial spur (as opposed to the larger, curved one in most other chalcidoids), and by antennae with two to four funicle segments and at most 10 antennomeres.

== See also ==
- Aprostocetus
