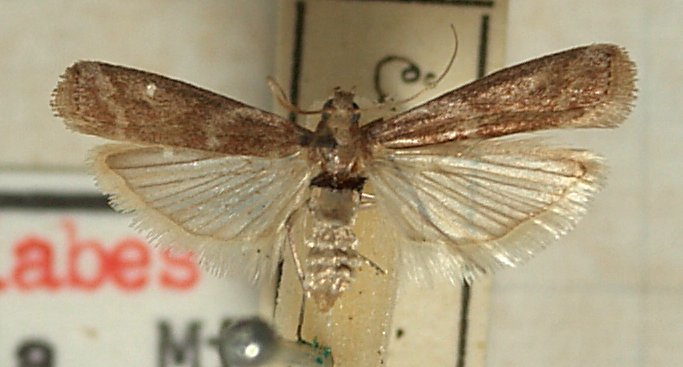

Scientific classification
- Domain: Eukaryota
- Kingdom: Animalia
- Phylum: Arthropoda
- Class: Insecta
- Order: Lepidoptera
- Family: Pyralidae
- Genus: Cryptoblabes
- Species: C. gnidiella

Binomial name
- Cryptoblabes gnidiella (Millière, 1867)

Synonyms
- Ephestia gnidiella Millière, 1867; Cryptoblabes aliena Swezey, 1909; Albinia wockiana Briosi, 1877

= Cryptoblabes gnidiella =

Honeydew moth

Species of moth

Cryptoblabes gnidiella, the honeydew moth or Christmasberry moth, is a moth of the family Pyralidae. It is natively found around the Mediterranean Sea but occurs also in Africa (South Africa, Réunion, Madagascar, Ghana), the Oriental & Australasian region (Australia, Hawaii, New Guinea) and is an introduced species in South America and Middle America.

The wingspan is 11–20 mm. The caterpillars feed on oranges and other types of citrus fruit, apple and maize. The adults feed on honeydew, and their particular association with the Christmasberry (Brazilian pepper, Schinus terebinthifolius) seems to be mainly for that reason.

This species has been reported from several dozen host plants, including many cultivated plants, especially fruits (e.g. grapes, lemons, and pomegranates). It is considered a serious pest.
