= Megorama frontale =

Scientific classification
- Kingdom: Animalia
- Phylum: Arthropoda
- Class: Insecta
- Order: Coleoptera
- Suborder: Polyphaga
- Superfamily: Bostrichoidea
- Family: Ptinidae
- Subfamily: Xyletininae
- Tribe: Lasiodermini
- Genus: Megorama
- Species: M. frontale

Binomial name
- Megorama frontale (LeConte, 1878)

Species of beetle

Megorama frontale is a species of beetle in the family Ptinidae.
