= Lasioderma hemiptychoides =

Scientific classification
- Kingdom: Animalia
- Phylum: Arthropoda
- Class: Insecta
- Order: Coleoptera
- Suborder: Polyphaga
- Superfamily: Bostrichoidea
- Family: Ptinidae
- Subfamily: Xyletininae
- Tribe: Lasiodermini
- Genus: Lasioderma
- Species: L. hemiptychoides

Binomial name
- Lasioderma hemiptychoides Fall, 1905

Species of beetle

Lasioderma hemiptychoides is a species of beetle in the family Ptinidae.
