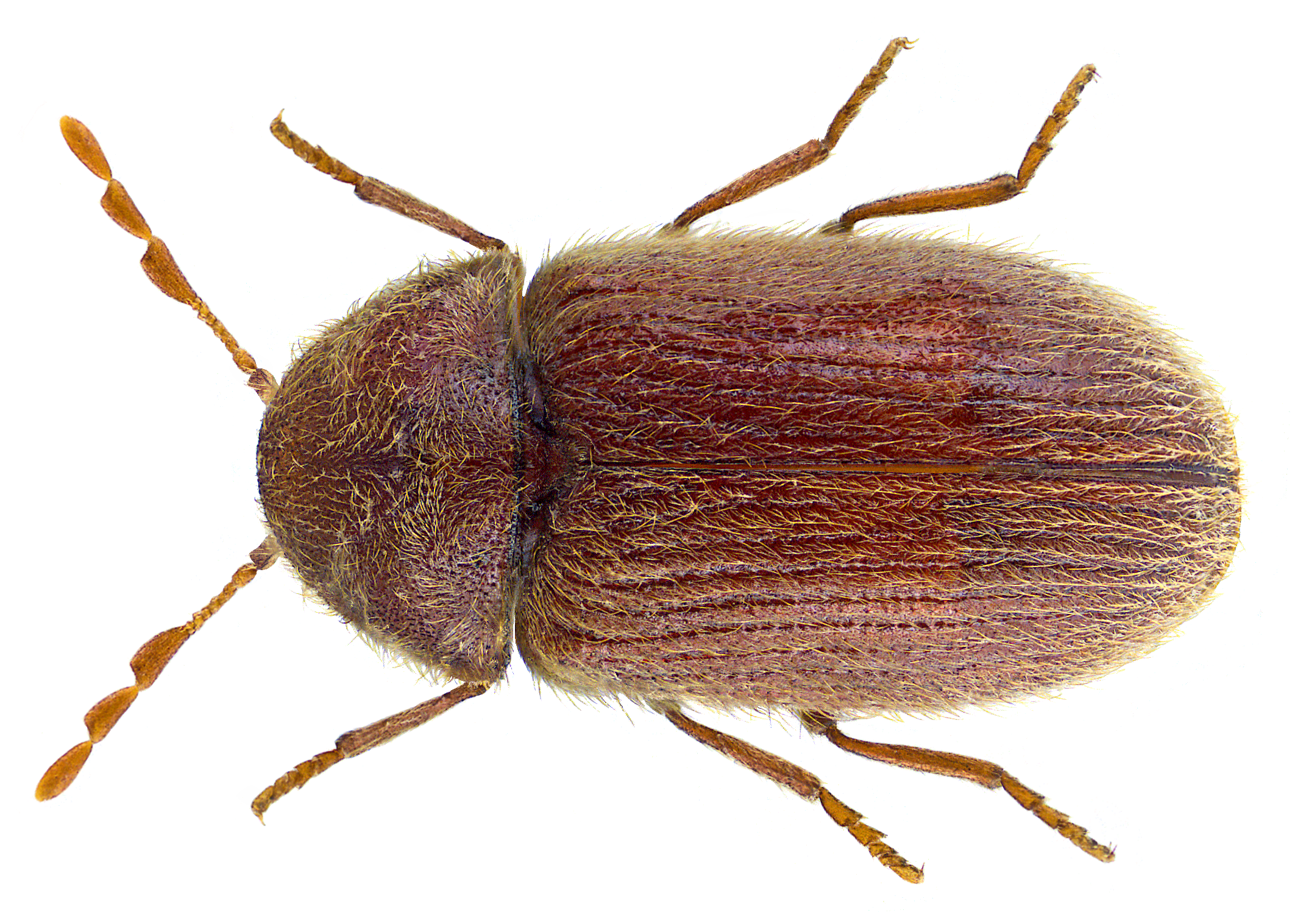

Scientific classification
- Kingdom: Animalia
- Phylum: Arthropoda
- Clade: Pancrustacea
- Class: Insecta
- Order: Coleoptera
- Suborder: Polyphaga
- Family: Ptinidae
- Subfamily: Anobiinae
- Tribe: Stegobiini
- Genus: Stegobium; Motschulsky, 1860
- Species: S. paniceum

Binomial name
- Stegobium paniceum (Linnaeus, 1758)

Synonyms
- Anobium paniceum Linnaeus, 1758; Sitodrepa panicea (Linnaeus, 1758)

= Drugstore beetle =

Species of beetle

The drugstore beetle (Stegobium paniceum), also known as the bread beetle, biscuit beetle, and misnamed as the biscuit weevil (despite not being a weevil), is a small brown beetle that infests a wide variety of dried plant products, where it is among the most common non-weevils. It is the only living member of the genus Stegobium. It belongs to the family Ptinidae, which also includes the deathwatch beetle, furniture beetle and cigarette beetle. A notable characteristic of this species is the symbiotic relationship the beetles have with a yeast-like fungus which is transmitted from female to larvae through the oviduct.

The drugstore beetle is distributed worldwide with higher prevalence in warmer climates. It is commonly confused with the cigarette beetle, as they have a similar size and coloring. Adults possess antennae ending in 3-segmented clubs, while cigarette beetles have serrated (saw-like) antennae. Their bodies are lined with grooves running longitudinally along the elytra, whereas the cigarette beetle is smooth.

== Description ==
Adult drugstore beetles are between 2.5 and 3.5 millimetres (3/32 and 1/8 in) long and have a reddish-brown colour with a cylindrical body. Larvae are habitually curled. The pupa is proportionally more slender than that of the cigarette beetle.

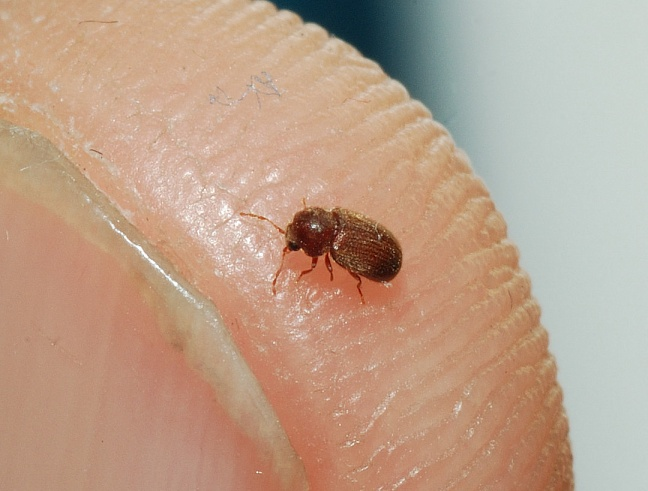
Drugstore beetle on human fingertip

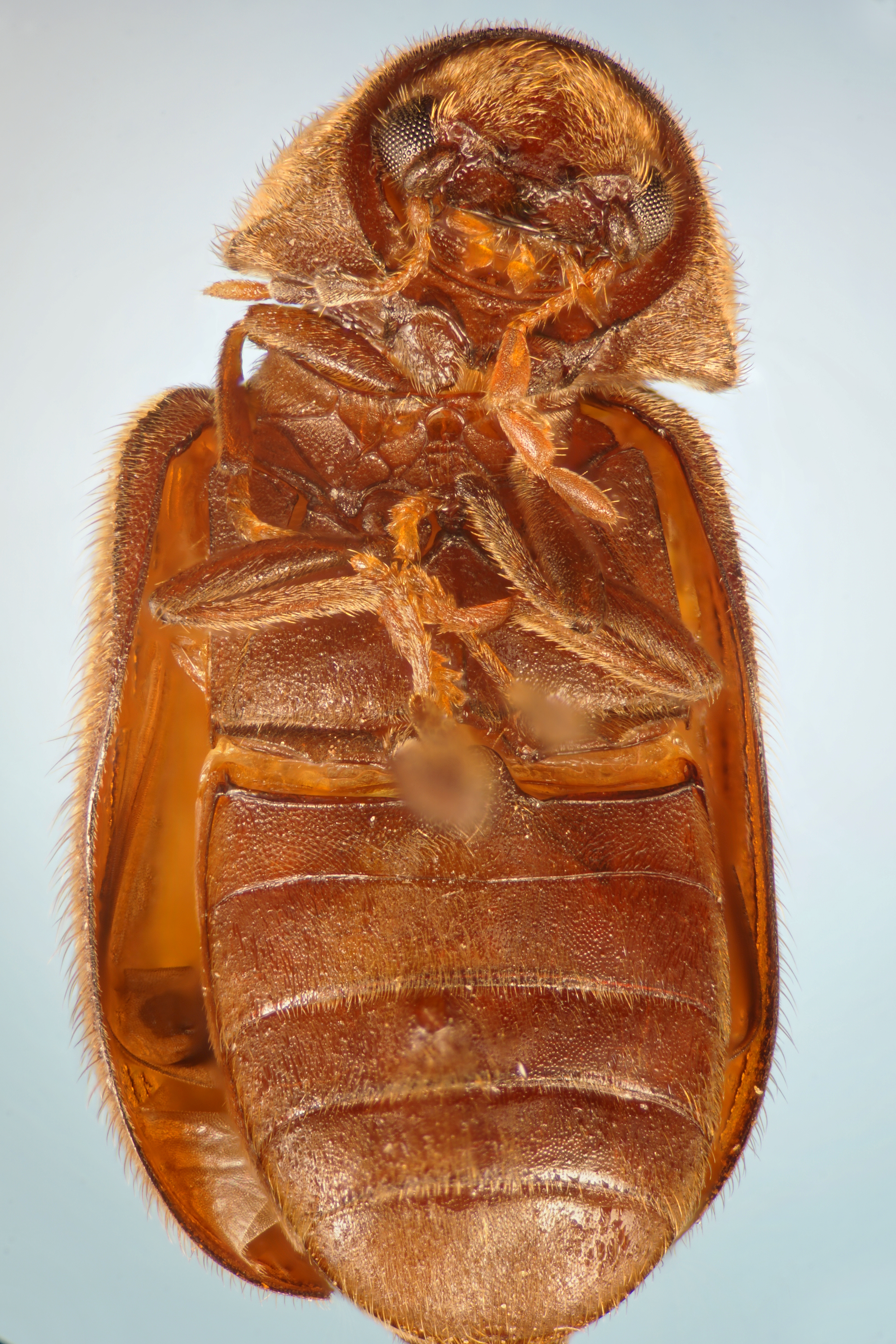
Ventral side of drugstore beetle

Males and females appear nearly identical, except that males have a sexually dimorphic slot-like structure on the tarsal claws which can only be observed under a microscope. During the pupal stage, males and females can be differentiated as the female genital papillae are bulging outwards and divergent, while the male genital papillae are not protruding and are not as pronounced. As adults carry their genitals within their body, there is no reliable way to distinguish sexes in live specimen beyond the pupal stage.

== Food resources ==
Drugstore beetles primarily feed and cause damage during the larval stage. The drugstore beetle attacks a wide variety of food sources including dried herbs and medicinal plants, earning its name. This species is known for feeding on both food and non-food materials. The beetle eats bread, grain, coffee beans, powdered milk, sweets like cookies and chocolates, spices and herbs, dried fruit, seeds, and more. They also consume museum specimens, wool, hair, leather, books, upholstery, and manuscripts. Adults gnaw through packaging forming large holes in the material, leading to their deterioration, contamination, and loss of structural integrity.

== Life history ==
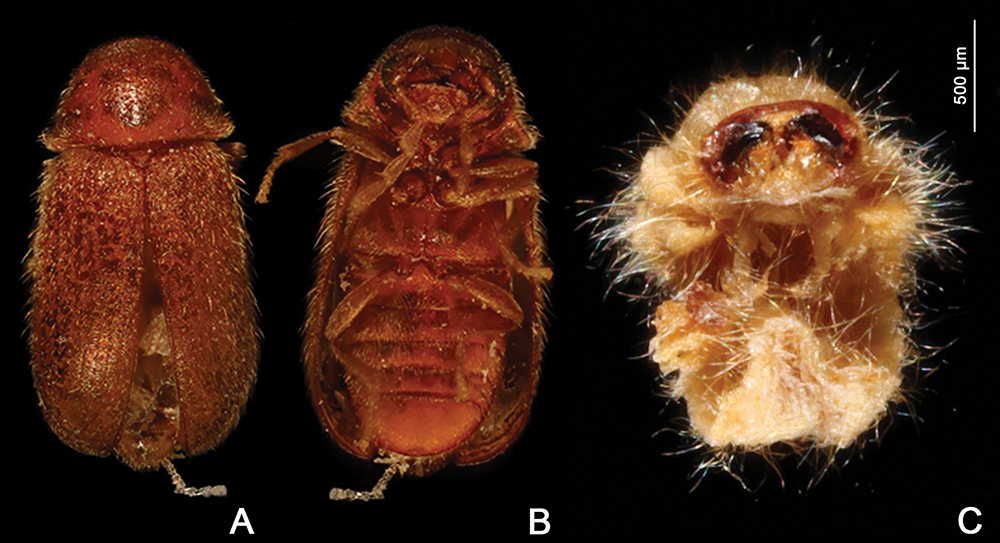
Drugstore beetle life cycle

The life cycle of this beetle transitions from the egg, to 4-6 larval instars, the construction of a cocoon for the pupa, and finally, the adult stage. The female can lay up to 75 eggs, depositing them in or near sources of food. Approximately 80% of her eggs end up being fertile. The egg stage lasts around 7–20 days at a temperature between 20 °C and 27.5 °C. The larvae then form a cocoon of silk and food material which they use to pupate. The pupa stays in the cocoon for varying amounts of time before the adult emerges. Between temperatures 20 °C and 27.5 °C, the pupal stage typically lasts from 5–12 days. Temperature and relative humidity play an important role in the growth and development of drugstore beetles, with the optimal range being between 15 °C and 35 °C, and an ideal temperature of 30 °C. Studies have found that increasing the relative humidity or temperature shortened the incubation period for these eggs and the pupal period. At peak conditions, it takes the eggs around 40 days to develop into adults. At the end of this cycle, adults live for about 85 days at 17.5 °C. The specific length of each stage depends on the temperature and food sources available to the beetles.

== Taxonomy and evolution ==
The drugstore beetle was originally described by Carl Linnaeus in 1758 as part of his Systema Naturae under the name Dermestes paniceus. It was assigned to the newly created genus Stegobium by Victor Motschulsky in 1860. The drugstore beetle is the only living species in the genus Stegobium. The oldest known member of the genus is Stegobium raritanensis from the Late Cretaceous (Turonian ~94-90 million years ago) aged New Jersey amber.

== Genetics ==
As a stored product pest, the evolutionary history of the drugstore beetle suggests that it evolved from a wood-feeding ancestor. Studies found that the beetle has 8 autosomal chromosomes and 1 sex chromosome forming a diploid set of 18 chromosomes. The sex determination system for Stegobium paniceum is based on XX-X0 as they lack the Y chromosome. The genome size of this species is estimated to be around 238 to 345 Mb which is significantly smaller than the median genome size of 760 Mb for the Coleoptera order.

== Mating ==
Male and female S. paniceum use sex pheromones to attract a mate. Female drugstore beetles utilize stegobinone, a volatile compound, to elicit a pheromonal response that communicates their presence and availability to males. This compound makes it much easier for the drugstore beetle to search for mates, indicates their willingness to mate, and facilitates the mating process by exciting and attracting males. They produce copious amounts of sex pheromones, reaching as much as 50 to 200 ng, allowing the females to maintain the signal for greater distances. It was found that male response to females peaked 5 to 12 days after becoming an adult. For females, their pheromone levels increased after 1 day, levelled off after 5, and lasted at least 14 days. The pheromone is also specific to this species, ensuring the propagation of the drugstore beetle's genes.

The proper orientation of the male and female during the mating process follows two experimentally determined phases called pre-mounting and post-mounting. The first phase involves the female proactively directing pre-mounting behaviors such as mate finding and courtship. The latter component involves the male detecting tactile cues by coming into contact with the female's dorsal setae, which are sensory hairs located on her back. The male uses physical touch to obtain information regarding the female's condition and her capacity to mate, which allows him to better engage in mating behaviors. The tarsal claw slots are secondary sex features of males that play a major role in mating behavior, especially in species that do not engage in parental care. The male drugstore beetle uses the claw slots found at the end of their legs to trap the setae on the elytra or forewing of the female. The hairs on the female beetle gets inserted and trapped into the claw slots of the males. This behavior is supported by evidence that when the male dismounts from the female, there is a time lag caused by the male trying to remove its claws from the female. This interaction improves the positioning of the male during mating, preventing him from falling off of the female prematurely, thereby prolonging the duration of mating and enhancing the overall mating process.

== Mutualism with fungi ==
Stegobium paniceum possess large cells with symbionts located in the mycetome and lumen of the intestine. Mycetomes, an organ part of the digestive system, has four lobes in drugstore beetle larvae. As the beetle develops into an adult, six tubular appendages appear from each lobe. Two of the six appendages may exist to remove waste products produced by the symbionts. They also serve to provide nitrogenous waste products to the yeast to promote their growth. The larvae lack symbionts immediately after hatching until they take in the yeast cells orally, infecting the mycetocytes of the midgut mycetome organ. The yeast continue to accumulate throughout the pupal stage. The symbiotic yeast cells found in this species are elongated with a bud attached to one end. The cells were named S. anobii and were classified under the genus Saccharomyces temporarily, but this taxonomic categorization needs further study. The size of the yeast cells ranges from 1.5 to 3.5 micrometers in width and 3 to 6 micrometers in length.

The beetles obtain sterols, necessary for their growth, from their diet as well as from the yeast-like fungi they harbor. The main function of the yeast is to provide their host with B-complex vitamins. Multiple theories exist to explain how the drugstore beetle obtains the vitamins from the yeast. The prevailing theory is that as the larvae develops, the yeast cells leave the mycetomes, allowing the host to obtain the essential vitamins by digesting the yeast cells. Another theory claims that the vitamins enter the host by diffusing from the yeast cells to the cytoplasm of the mycetome cells. Experiments discovered that when the yeast cells were eliminated, no larval growth occurred, indicating that the vitamins are essential for host survival. Drugstore beetles rely on the symbiotic relationship they have with the yeast cells housed within their bodies to survive. While rearing their young, females use their oviducts to place the yeast cells on their eggs which are then consumed by larvae after they hatch. The B vitamins that the yeast produce are essential for the survival of the larvae, making it possible for them to exist in areas with food of poorer nutritional value. This symbiotic relationship increases the chance of survival for the larvae even in environments with scarce resources. As the beetle's lifespan increases, the yeast also live for longer. The yeast cells are able to propagate themselves using the beetles, spreading through the beetle's offspring. The drugstore beetle act as a source of protection for the yeast as well. Both groups benefit greatly from their coexistence in this symbiotic relationship.

== Pest control ==
The oldest records of the modern drugstore beetle as a pest are known from the Bronze Age of Akrotiri, Santorini, Greece around 1500 BC where it was found associated with stored pulses.

=== Source of infestation ===
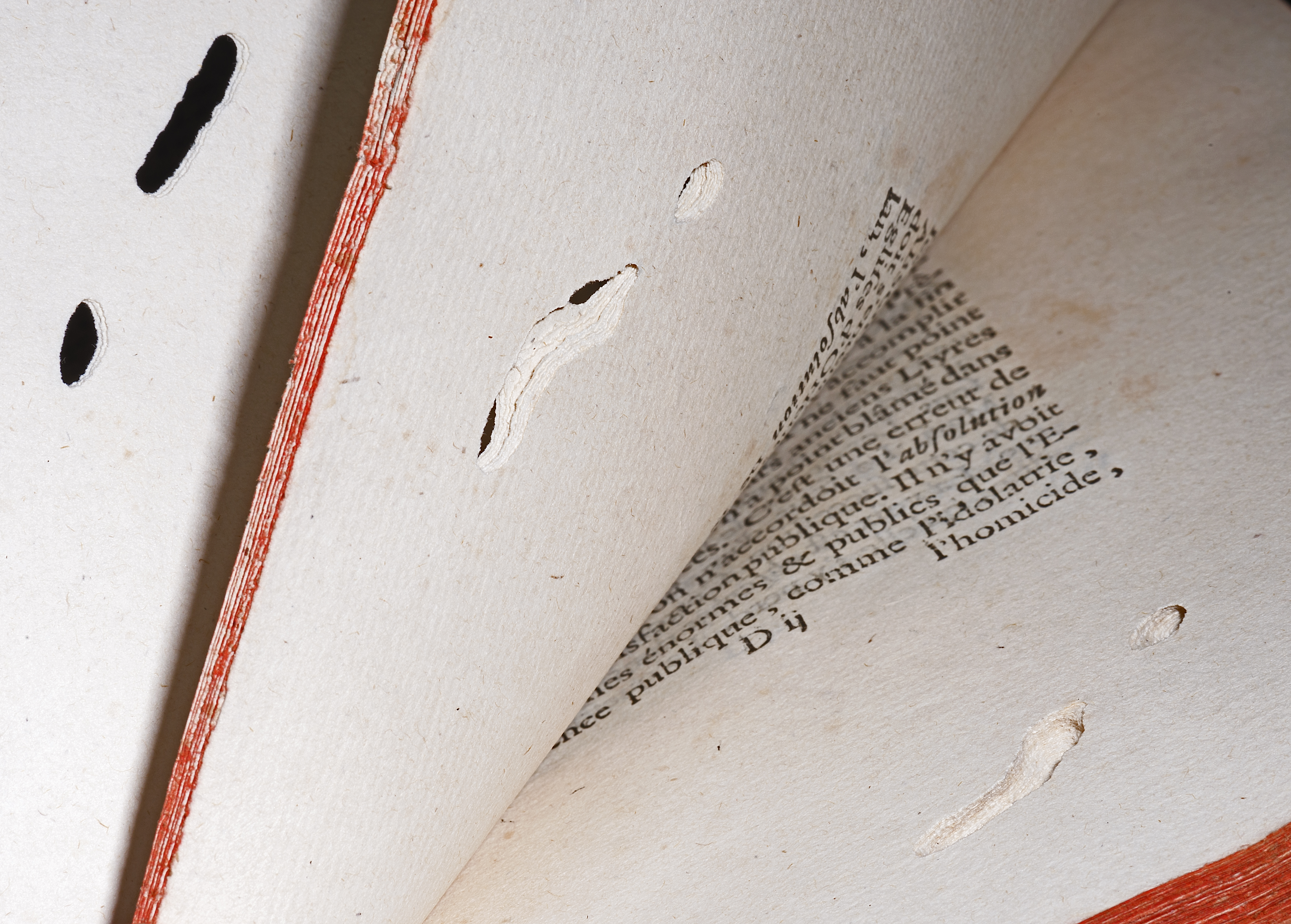
Drugstore beetle damage

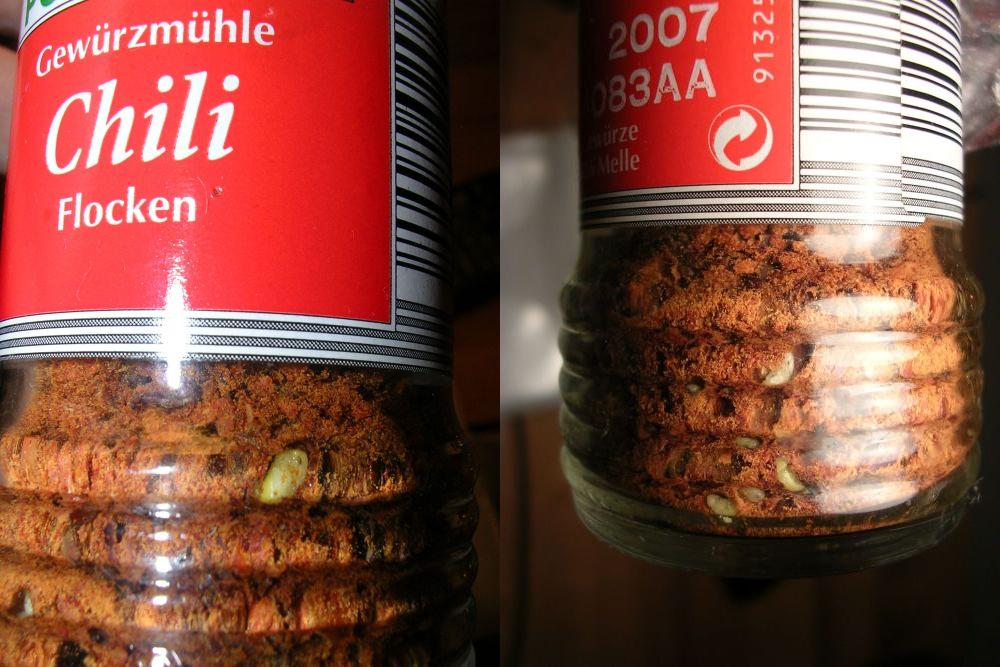
Drugstore beetle as a household pest

The most effective method of ridding a home of this beetle is to try to discover the source of the infestation. Drugstore beetles often enter a home in bulk items like bird seed, grass seed, or dry pet food, where several generations of beetles can develop unnoticed until some of the adults eventually leave to infest new locations. Telltale signs of infested items are shot-like holes puncturing the outside packaging of food items and pockmarking solid items like crackers and pasta, as well as loose powder at the bottom of storage bags. While adult beetles do not feed, they are adept at chewing holes.

Once inside the home, the adult beetles will lay their eggs on a variety of foods including whole grains, processed grains and vegetative material. Food sources which can become infested include grains, flour, bread, rice, seeds, beans, pasta, cereals, bird seed, grass seed, potpourri, spices, teas, and tobacco. While they are highly adept at chewing out of cardboard, foil, and plastic film to escape the package in which they have undergone metamorphosis to adults, they are somewhat less likely to eat into a sealed, airtight foil or plastic bag. Ideally, all open packages should be discarded in an infested home; however, it is also effective to freeze items if the entire contents can be brought below −20 °C (−4 °F).

Food storage areas like pantries and cabinets need to be vacuumed thoroughly, including the crevices between floor boards, the corners of cabinets, and areas where mice may have hoarded things like dry dog food. A bird nest within a home can also provide a haven for drugstore beetles, and a professional may need to be consulted to address this. Lowering home humidity levels can be helpful as well. While the use of chemical insecticides may be undesirable in food storage areas, food grade diatomaceous earth can be useful sprinkled in corners or even mixed into bird seed (diatomaceous earth is edible, but inhaling it should be avoided).

Another way of controlling the population rate could be by exposing the beetle to higher temperatures (43–55 °C), over longer periods of time.

=== Efficacy of essential oils ===
The cons of insecticides, increasing resistance to compounds, and high costs were incentives that drove researchers to discover alternate means of pursuing pest control. In the search for decent alternatives, scientists have found that carbon dioxide gas (CO_{2}) and essential oils from plants could be used to safely regulate Drugstore Beetle numbers. This transition away from synthetic insecticides to plant based insecticides was meant to resolve some of the health concerns associated with synthetic compounds. Studies were conducted to investigate the usefulness of an essential oil from Z. bungeanum Maxim on Drugstore Beetle larvae and adults. Results showed that beetles that were given higher doses of these oils had higher rates of mortality. The benefit of using essential oils is that they exhibit low mammalian toxicity which makes it a promising alternative to synthetic insecticides. Z. bungeanum Maxim was shown to have high repellent activity which points to its promise as an effective means of pest control.

Drugstore Beetles are a pest that severely impacts Chinese medicinal materials. The essential oil from Z. bungeanum Maxim provides a safer alternative for pest control. It has the capacity to prolong the time it takes for larvae to develop and can even keep adults from laying eggs successfully, effectively controlling pest numbers. Both adults and larvae were impacted by the oils and any nuances in their responses was attributed to differences in morphology and behavioral response. The essential oil can be used as a natural pest control agent with healthier and safer implications compared to other means of pest management.

== Economic impact ==
A pest of many dried plant products, the drugstore beetle negatively impacts stored materials and leads to economic loss. Fumigants like phosphine were previously used to remove this pest, but after repeated usage, the fumigants posed a risk to health. Many medicinal plants of China which are used for various treatments are damaged by this pest, greatly impacting the economy. Thus, there is great motive for finding other mechanisms of combatting this species. Sex pheromones play a significant role in mate selection which suggests that this beetle has a developed olfactory system, allowing semiochemical strategies to be used to provide a safe way to control this pest. S. paniceum relies on semiochemicals to act as signals that help them locate food and oviposition and mating sites. Chemicals released by Chinese medicinal plant materials (CMPMs) attracts large numbers of these beetles, leading to an infestation. The behavior of drugstore beetles can be manipulated by utilizing volatile compounds similar to those produced by the CMPMs to target their olfactory system, but further research is needed to study these compounds.

The economic consequences of drugstore beetles are significant and diverse, affecting several businesses and individuals worldwide. These persistent pests, categorized as stored product beetles, have a remarkable ability to infest and damage a wide range of stored goods, including grains, cereals, spices, pharmaceuticals, and more. Their presence in stored products not only contaminates them with insect fragments, exoskeletons, and fecal matter but also renders them unfit for human consumption, leading to significant financial losses for businesses and households alike. The damage inflicted by drugstore beetles often necessitates the disposal of affected goods, resulting in wasted inventory and revenue loss.

Additionally, the presence of pests in food processing facilities, warehouses, and retail outlets can damage their reputation, delay the flow of goods, and attract attention from regulatory authorities, therefore worsening the economic impact. Effective pest management strategies, including regular inspection, proper storage practices, and sanitation efforts, are essential to mitigate the economic impact of drugstore beetles. By addressing infestations promptly and implementing proactive control measures, businesses and households can minimize financial losses and safeguard stored commodities from these persistent pests.

== Treatment ==
The drugstore beetle commonly infests stored products, posing a problem to many homes. There are many ways to counter their rapid growth. Once the source of the infestation is located, any disposable items populated with beetles should be wrapped in plastic and discarded. Because the beetles lay their eggs on or near food items, it is important to thoroughly inspect food containers for them. The drugstore beetle prefers warmer temperatures so placing them in a freezer for either 16 days at −2 °C or 7 days at −25 °C will kill them at any stage in their life cycle. Alternatively, the beetles can also be heated at extremely high temperatures of 88 °C for an hour or 48 °C for 16 to 24 hours in an oven. Regular check-up and maintenance is required to prevent reinfestation. This means cleaning up any spilled items quickly and storing food in airtight glass, plastic, or metal containers. The last resort is utilizing insecticides or insect growth regulators, but these extreme measures are typically not necessary.
