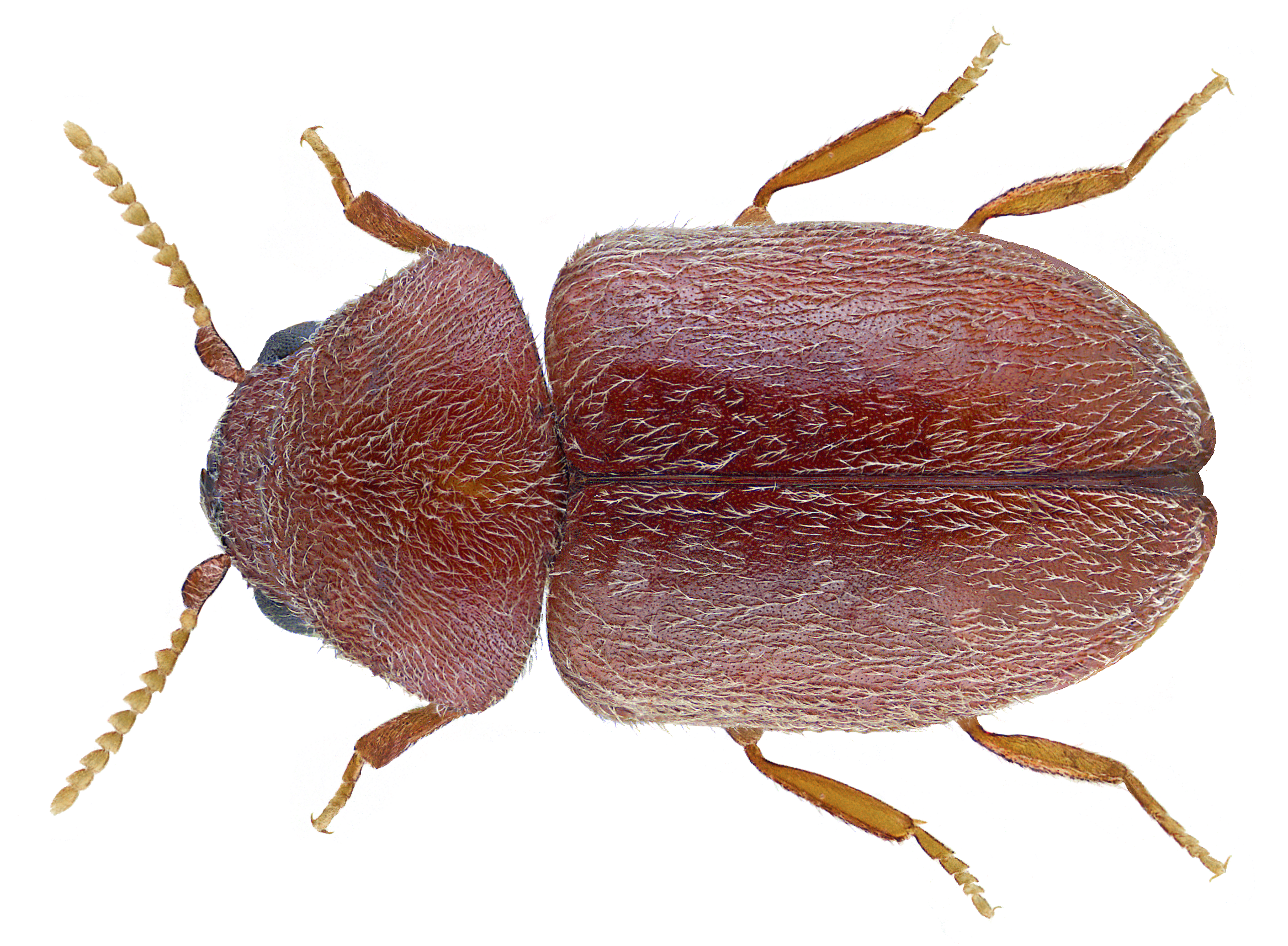

Scientific classification
- Kingdom: Animalia
- Phylum: Arthropoda
- Clade: Pancrustacea
- Class: Insecta
- Order: Coleoptera
- Suborder: Polyphaga
- Family: Ptinidae
- Genus: Lasioderma
- Species: L. serricorne

Binomial name
- Lasioderma serricorne (Fabricius, 1792)

Synonyms
- Lasioderma breve (Wollaston, 1861); Lasioderma castaneum Melsheimer, 1846; Lasioderma fuscum (Rey, 1892); Lasioderma testaceum (Duftschmid, 1825); Lasioderma torquatum (Chevrolat, 1859); Pseudochina fuscum Rey, 1892; Ptinus serricorne Fabricius, 1792; Ptilinus testaceus Duftschmid, 1825; Xyletinus torquatum Chevrolat, 1859

= Lasioderma serricorne =

Species of beetle

Lasioderma serricorne, more commonly referred to as the cigarette beetle, cigar beetle, paprika beetle or tobacco beetle, is a small beetle that shares a resemblance with the drugstore beetle (Stegobium paniceum) and the common furniture beetle (Anobium punctatum). The cigarette beetle, along with the drugstore and furniture beetles, all belong to the beetle family Ptinidae. The cigarette beetle can be distinguished from A. punctatum by its flatter thorax, whereas A. punctatum has a humped thorax. The cigarette beetle can be further differentiated from S. paniceum by its uniformly serrated antennae with unmodified apex, unlike the three-segmented apical "club" of S. paniceum. Additionally, L. serricorne has no evident grooves in its elytra, or hardened wing covers, compared to A. punctatum and S. paniceum which both have grooves.

In addition to cigarette beetle, other common names for L. serricorne include "tobacco bug", "tobacco borer", "tobacco weevil" and "cheroot beetle". Lastly, another common name for the species is "tow bug", after the species' tendency to feed on upholstery fillings such as tow, hemp, and flax.

The cigarette beetle measures between 2 and 3 mm in length, making the cigarette beetle relatively small, and it is dark brown in color. Despite its diminutive size, the cigarette beetle is a significant pest in tobacco related industries for which it gets its namesake. Beyond tobacco, the cigarette beetle will infest most dry goods, including cereals, dried fruits, herbs, flour, and certain animal products.

Geographically, L. serricorne is naturally found in pan-tropical regions, but they have been distributed all over the world through the dried goods trade. The distribution and success of reproduction of the species is heavily tied to their environment. Larvae of the cigarette beetle require temperatures between 15 °C and 40 °C in order to successfully hatch, with the most optimal range for fecundity being between 30 °C and 33 °C. While the cigarette beetle can be found globally, this temperature preference allows the species to thrive best in tropical zones where temperature conditions are most suitable to this ideal range.

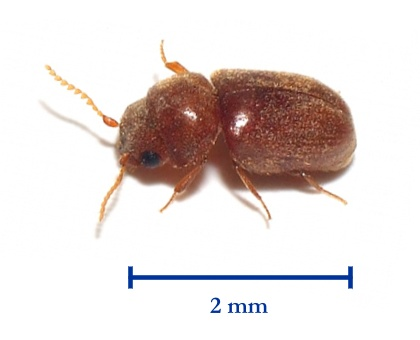
L. serricorne to scale

The cigarette beetle also has strong flight capability, which contributes to its migration pattern. This ability to move efficiently between infested food sources to uninfested food sources greatly contributes to the species' success as a pest and its geographic range.

The primary food source for this species includes the stored commodities they infest, such as spices, seeds, rice, cereals, and most notably, dried tobacco leaves. The food source of the cigarette beetle significantly influences fecundity, developmental time, survival rates, and body weight. The lowest fecundity was reported with tobacco leaves as a food source, while flour produced the highest fecundity.

== Geographic range ==
Lasioderma serricorne are naturally found in pan-tropical areas but can be found anywhere where dried tobacco is stored. The species has been distributed throughout the world by transportation of infested dried goods. Climate is vital to the growth and reproduction of L. serricorne, specifically in terms of temperature. L. serricorne larvae will not hatch below 15 °C or above 40 °C. The longevity and fecundity of adult beetles are also impacted, both of which are significantly reduced at high temperatures. Climates in the 33 °C to 37.5 °C range can significantly decrease the duration of the preoviposition period, while the oviposition period tends to lengthen at this temperature range. The ideal temperature range for maximum fecundity, for cigarette beetles is 30 °C to 33 °C. Thus, the climate that is best suited to this species is the tropical zone, as a significant limitation to their geographic distribution is low temperature.

Lasioderma serricorne are strong fliers, which contributes to their migration patterns. Flying migrant L. serricorne beetles have a significant impact on the species' ability to infest in different agricultural landscapes, which further contributes to the species' wide geographic range.

== Food resources ==
The common name of cigarette beetle may be misleading, as this species has a wide range of food resources. In fact, cigarette beetles have the most varied diet of storage insects, second only to T. castaneum.

Lasioderma serricorne primarily feed off stored commodities such as spices, seeds, rice, cereal, and most notably dried tobacco leaves. The fecundity, developmental time, egg-to-adult survival rate, and adult body weight of the L. serricorne is heavily influenced by their food source. The food source that results in the highest fecundity is wheat flour, while the lowest fecundity is found when tobacco leaves are the primary food source. Additionally, larvae reared in wheat flour display the highest survival rates into adulthood. When infesting spices, cayenne pepper and paprika are the most favorable food sources to produce the highest body weights and longest life spans in L. serricorne.

Interestingly, L. serricorne is one of the only species known to inhabit and feed upon dry tobacco and its products. This is due to the fact that tobacco is nutritionally deficient and a prominent chemical in tobacco, nicotine, can cause nicotine toxicity in insects. Nicotine is an incredibly toxic substance to soft bodied insects and is one of the most effective botanical pesticides. It was previously thought that cigarette beetles were able to process nicotine into a less harmful chemical, cotinine. However, current research suggests that nicotine can pass unmetabolized through cigarette beetles without causing significant damage. Specifically, over 91% of digested nicotine can be recovered in the beetle's waste, or frass. It has been suggested that the microbes in L. serricorne's gut have contributed to their ability to pass nicotine unmetabolized and harmlessly though their digestive systems.

While cured tobacco is the cigarette beetle's most abundant food source, they display preference amongst types of cured tobacco. It was found that cigarette beetles most prefer flue-cured type, and least preferred is Burley. It can be concluded that generally cigarette beetles have a preference for tobacco types with the highest sugar content and lowest nicotine percentage.

=== Adult ===
The most common food resource for adult cigarette beetles is cured tobacco leaves, particularly tobacco leaves stored in commodity warehouses and facilities. However, as stated earlier they will consume a wide variety of dried good product depending on where they hatched.

=== Larvae ===
Newly emerged larvae will begin eating the substrate within which they were laid upon given that it is a suitable food resource. As for the amount of food larvae require, it takes about 0.012-0.15 g of food for a larva to grow into adulthood.

When the substrate they are hatched on is not suitable for the cigarette beetle's diet, the larvae may eat the eggshell they hatched from, as well as other unhatched eggs. However, this is not sufficient to bring the larvae into adulthood, and the larvae will die if a suitable food source is not found.

== Parental care ==
=== Oviposition ===
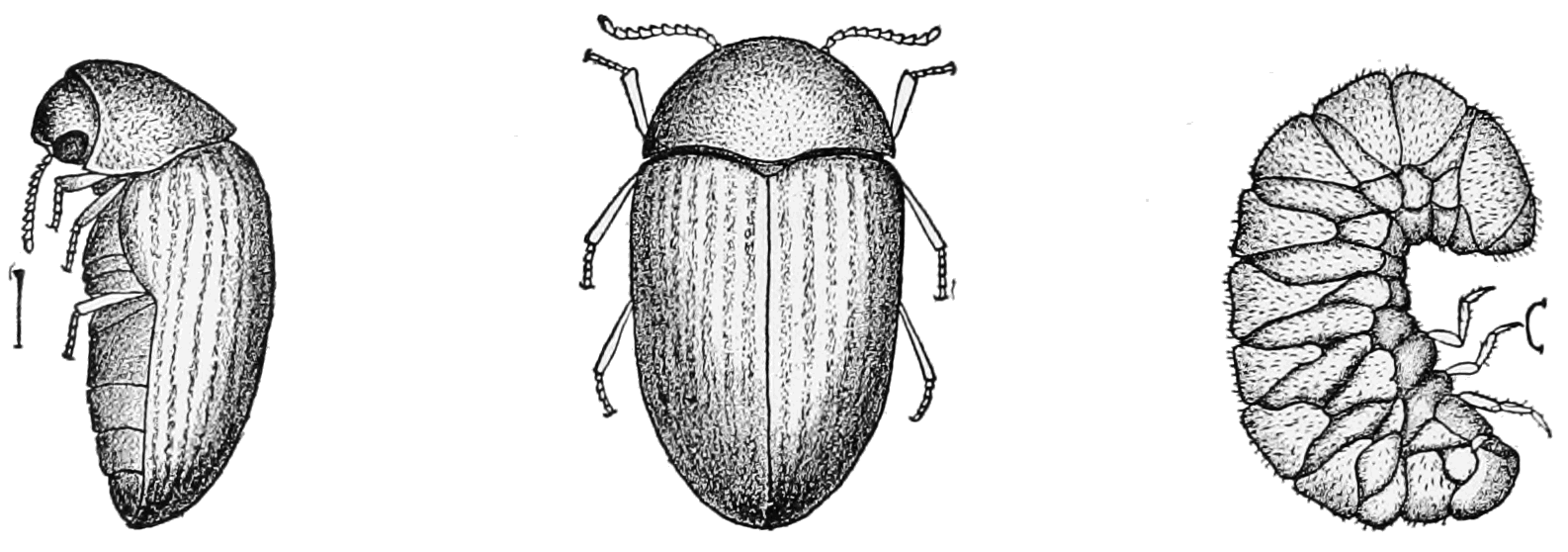
Cigarette Beetle Stages of Development

The number of eggs a female cigarette beetle will lay during oviposition varies greatly on the environment the female has to lay eggs on. Typically, a female will lay up to 100 eggs in an evening directly on their food source. Most eggs are laid by a female within 4 days of adult emergence, but females can lay eggs up to 12 days after emerging into adulthood. Most of the time, females will oviposit at or near the site where they themselves had developed. The females and males of the cigarette beetle species do not care for their offspring after oviposition is completed. The rate of oviposition in cigarette beetles is highest at the upper temperature limit for reproduction but decreased sharply at any temperature above this ideal range. The type of substrate the cigarette beetle lays eggs on can impact the number of eggs laid, where lying eggs on rice produced the smallest number of eggs and lying eggs on wheat produced the greatest number of eggs.

=== Host learning and selection for egg laying ===
Cigarette beetles can be influenced on where to lay their eggs by smell. A study found that cigarette beetles produced significantly more eggs when given the opportunity to lay them on a food substrate as opposed to a non-food substrate. This effect can be found for a variety of food substrates, and although the success varies between types of food, all food substrates perform better than nonfood material.

==== Odor ====
Part of L. serricorne's ability to recognize the difference between food and non-food substrate and which would in turn make the best oviposition location is through odor. When a non-food substrate was soaked in the smell of tobacco and wheat, female cigarette beetles not only choose to oviposition there, but laid significantly more eggs than they did on the non-food odor substrate. This has implications for their success as a pest, as the more attractive a food environment is by odor, the more eggs they will lay. This knowledge has contributed to the production of odorous cigarette beetle repellant solution, which coats dried goods in a non-food odor that deters them from lying eggs in packaged products.

== Life history ==
=== Life cycle ===
==== Egg ====
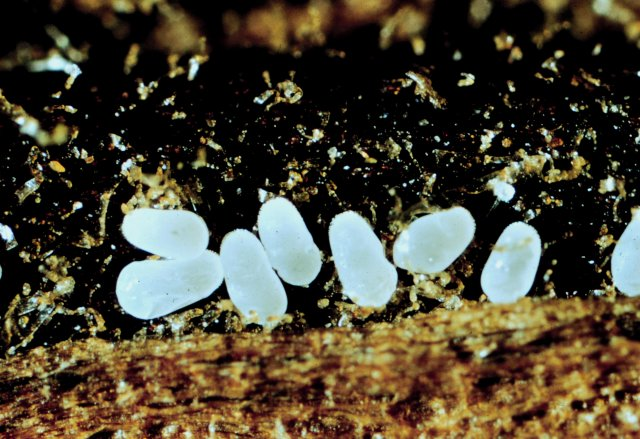
Eggs

Lasioderma serricorne eggs are white and opaque when they are first laid, but soon become yellow tinted after hatching. They are oblong in shape, and their length is generally 0.29 to 0.50 mm long with a diameter of 0.18-0.25 mm. An individual egg typically weighs between 8.0 and 9.0 μg.

The pre-oviposition period of L. serricorne ranges from 1 to 5 days. During oviposition, the female beetle will lay between 10 and 100 eggs in the evening or night directly on top of dried food material. The number of eggs laid can depend on the type of substrate they are laid upon. Crowding can cause the female beetle to deposit their mature eggs more quickly, but in general females will reduce the number of eggs they lay when faced with over-population. Eggs will usually hatch 6–8 days after they are laid, and at suitable temperatures egg viability can be up to 100%.

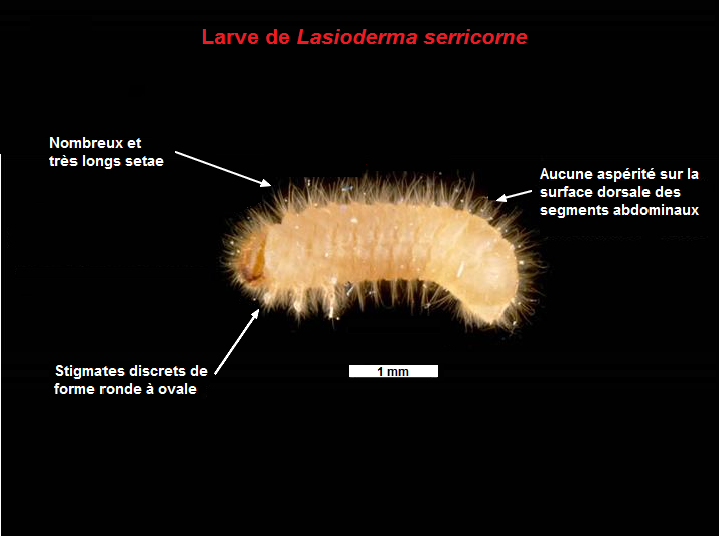
L. serricorne larva

==== Larva ====
The cigarette beetle's larvae can be distinguished with difficulty from the grubs of the drugstore beetle, most easily by their longer hair and dark head capsule.

To hatch, the L. serricorne larva will chew through the chorion of the egg on the posterior side. The larva then lifts the chewed shell like a cap, which allows the larva to penetrate the opening. Freshly hatched larvae are somewhat transparent, but gradually will assume a yellow-white color. When no other food is available, the larva occasionally will eat the rest of their eggshell as well as the shells of unhatched eggs surrounding them. When the larva emerges, it is typically active with the ability to move significant distances to search for food. This ability of the L. serricorne larva to move form infested to non-infested dried food sources contributes to the species' high rates of infestation. Their small size also gives them the ability to penetrate small openings in the seams of packaged commodities.

Lasioderma serricorne larva will molt twice and on the second molt will assume a scarabaeiform shape. After molting, larvae are typically less active, but they still are able to move considerable distances. At this stage, larvae tend to bury deep into commodities when they are in commodities that are packed loosely enough to do so. Fully grown larvae become immobile and stop feeding. At this stage, the larva will form a cocoon using food waste material and secretions from their midgut. Cocoons usually assume an ovoid shape, but this can vary. They typically measure 4.5 mm long and 3 mm wide. In total, L. serricorne larva will typically undergo four growth periods before pupation, although this depends on the temperature they are reared in.

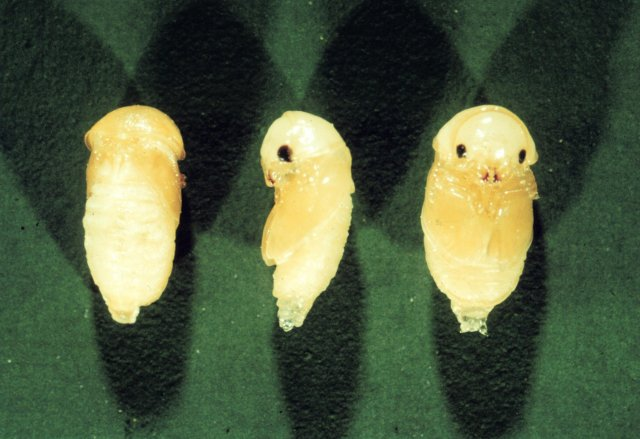
L. serricorne pupa

==== Pupation ====
Larva will remain in their cocoon for 2–4 days undergoing structural changes before emerging as a pupa. Pupae are a uniform white color that can be accompanied by a green tint when newly formed. The pupae will gradually take on a red-brown color that darkens as they age. Pupae are not active and have limited movement. The average length of a pupa is 3.5 mm with an average width of 1.7 mm. Pupae display sexual dimorphism, where male pupae have globular non-projecting genitalia while females have divergent genitalia.

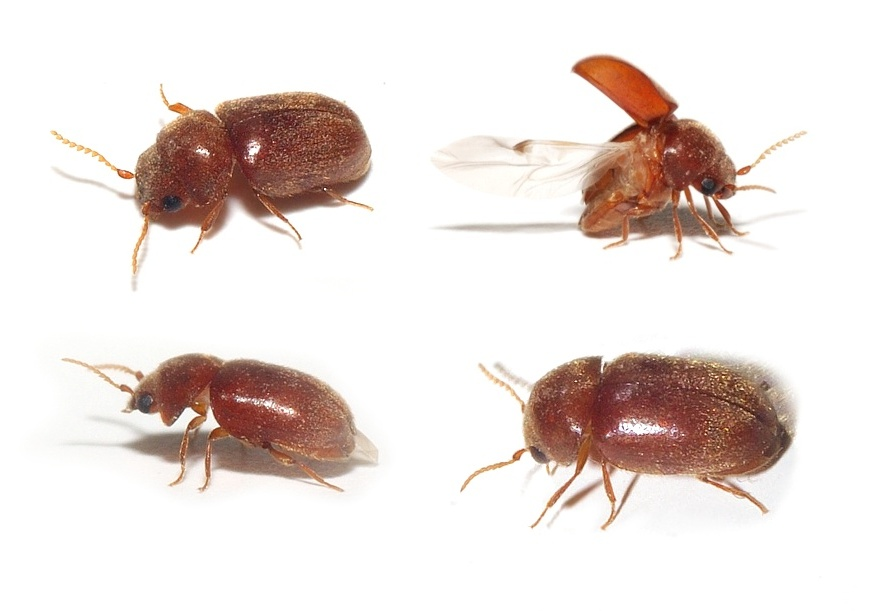
Several views of Adult Lasioderma serricorne specimen

==== Adult ====
Adult L. serricorne will stay in the pupal stage for 4–6 days before they emerge fully sexually matured and colored. The adult body is an elongated oval that is slightly convex. Their antennae contain 11 segments, some of which are distinctly triangular. Their matured color is a deep red-brown. There also exists a mutated black body form of the species.

Adult females will often weigh more than their male counterpart. The average length of an adult female is around 2.6 mm long, while the average width is 1.4 mm. For an adult male, their average length is 2.1 mm in length, and they have an average width of 1.2 mm. Adult L. serricorne have wings and are capable of flight. Adults typically live for 2–7 weeks but several factors influence their longevity, such as mating status and larval food substrate.

== Enemies ==
Parasites and predators have caused fluctuations in L. serricorne's population. The most significant enemies of the cigarette beetle are the Anisopteromalus calandrae and Lariophagus distinguendus. Both parasitoid species will attack cigarette beetles in the late larval and pupal stages. A. calendrae is a pteromalid wasp, and after developing to adulthood, the female wasp will mate and oviposit in the beetle larvae and pupae. Moniezella Augusta is another predator of the beetle and is a type of predatory mite which kills and eats L. serricome in the larval and pupal stage. Other predators that occasionally feed on L. serricorne include Chaeotospila elegans and two beetles called Tenebroides mauritanicus and Pediculoides ventricosus. None of these predators have caused significant reductions in the L. serricorne population though.

== Mating ==
=== Searching for a mate ===
Lasioderma serricorne have the ability to mate successfully as soon as they emerge from the pupal cell, but typically mate 2–3 days after emerging. Mating typically takes place on top of the food substrate. The courtship of the adult beetles is facilitated by pheromonal and tactile stimulation provided by the female beetle. Male cigarette beetles will often attempt to mate with other males, as well, particularly when present near a pheromone source.

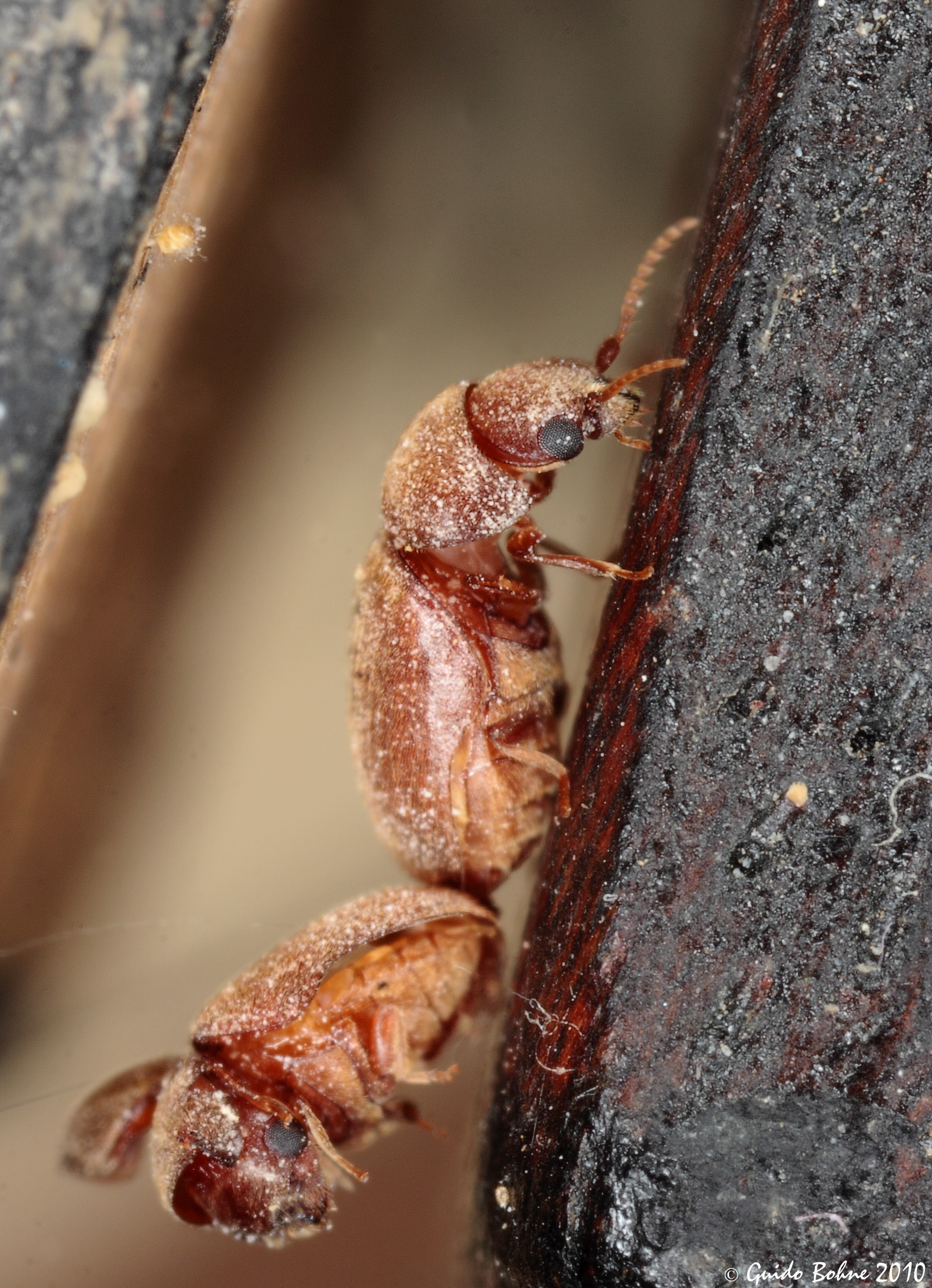
Adult female and male cigarette beetles mating.

==== Pheromones ====
Female cigarette beetles produce a sex pheromone that incites a strong attraction in their male counterparts that excites them to mate. The pheromone is produced by a specialized gland in the female's abdomen. The gland connects to a duct which allows for secretion from a pore above the female's genitalia. The primary compound secreted by this gland is serricornin.

Responsiveness to serricornin increases with the age of unmated males, reaching maximum attractiveness in the fourth week of adult life.

After receiving a serricornin signal and experiencing an attraction to the female, a male will lower its head and vibrate their antennae, extending their forelegs, and quickly walk around. They then will mount the female.

=== Female/male interactions ===
During mating, the male and female beetles orient opposite each other so that only their abdominal ends touch each other. Both sexes of the species can mate multiple times and engage in repeated mating. Unlike other species, the amount of mating occurrences has no effect on the number of eggs that are laid.

Female cigarette beetles engage in polyandry and mating with multiple males has shown to reduce female lifespan. This effect is heightened when one of their mates is an aggressive male. Aggressive males can cause a high cost of mating in Cigarette Beetle females due to increased male sexual harassment and damage from the male genitalia. The male genitalia can cause damage to the female's reproductive tract with the spines it bears or by the toxic elements in their ejaculate.

== Mutualism ==
Cigarette beetles carry a symbiotic yeast, Symbiotaphrina kochii, that is transmitted to the next generation superficially on the eggs and carried internally in larvae and adults in the mycetome, a specialized organ that is linked to the gut. The yeast cells assist in the digestion of less nutritious foods, supply needed B-vitamins and sterols, and provide resistance to certain toxins.

The diversity of the cigarette beetle's diet and ability to survive on foods of poor nutritional quality is due largely to this symbiotic relationship. The yeasts are transferred from parent to offspring when the egg passes through the oviduct. When the larvae hatch, they feed on the yeast which allows a population of yeast to grow in the mycetoma organ of the beetle's gut. Here, the yeast produces a variety of B-vitamins that are required to sustain life but may not be provided by the beetle's diet.

== Infestation ==
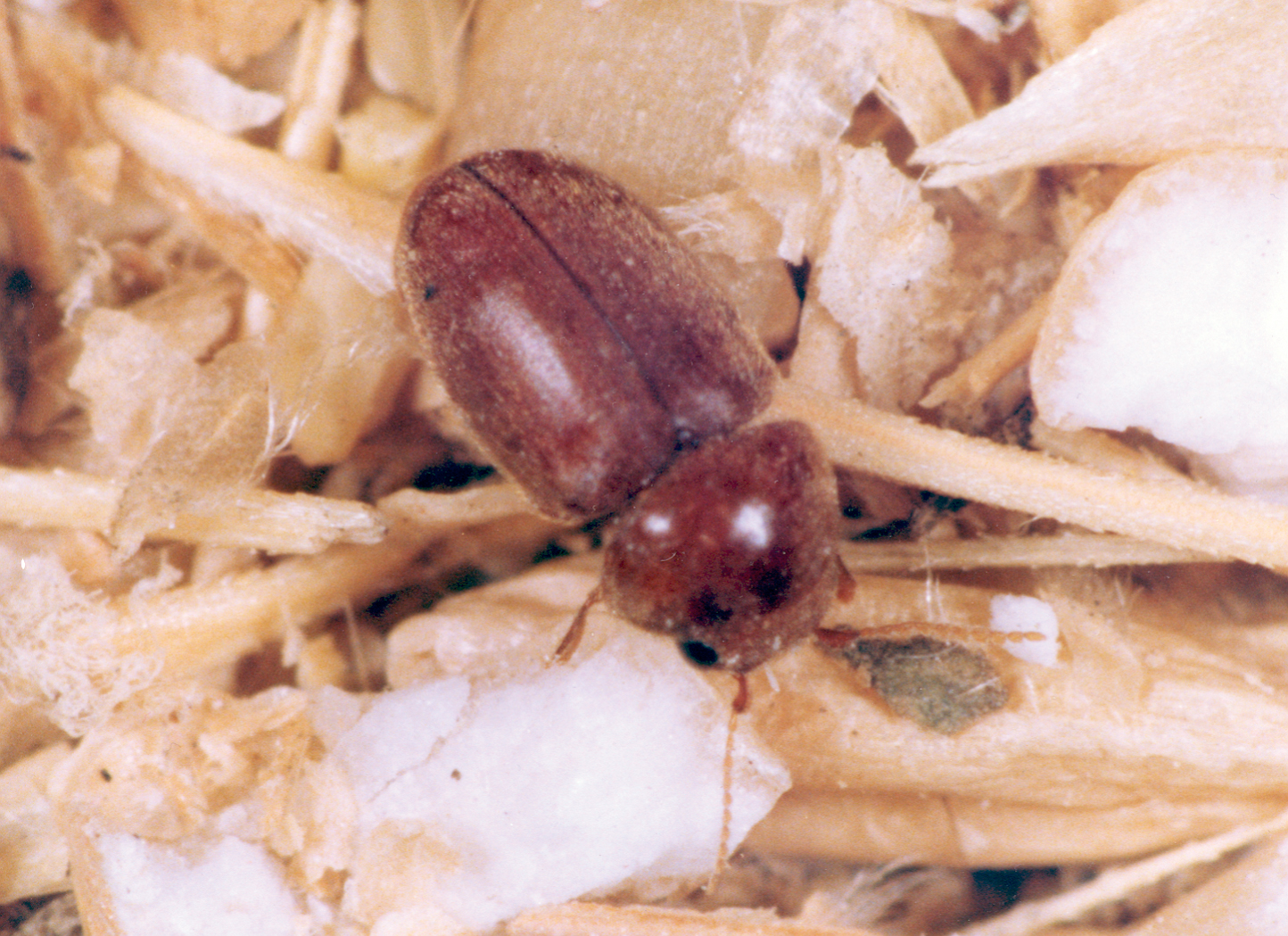
Cigarette beetle on dried tobacco product.

Tobacco and its related products can be infested by Lasioderma serricorne and Ephestia elutella (tobacco moth), which are the most widespread and damaging pests for the tobacco industry. Infestation can range from the tobacco cultivated in the fields to the leaves used for manufacturing cigars, cigarillos, cigarettes, etc. Besides tobacco products, the beetle causes significant damage to many stored food products including flours, dry mixes, dried fruits, and other products commonly kept in the kitchens, pantries, or large supply containers. They may also infest non-food products such as dried plants and herbarium specimen.

During infestation, adults will make holes in food packaging to escape. Adults rarely feed on the infested material. Larvae causes the most significant damage to dried packaged goods.

The cigarette beetle is known for its economic impact on tobacco leaves. L. serricorne are estimated to be present in up to 1% of all warehoused tobacco product. Significant economic loss also occurs when the beetle infests individual products such as cigarettes.

The damage that cigarette beetles cause to dried stored products is typically severe, mostly due to the fact that the species spends its entire life stages inside its food, feeding on them and causing many aspects of damage. One, the beetles cause product weight loss due to the amount of raw material actually consumed by the pests. Although each individual beetle does not consume a significant amount of product, infestations can produce thousands of these beetles. Second, infestation of product significantly reduces the market value of the product. Third, consumers may be less likely to buy a product that is infested in the future, even if it is no longer infested.

=== Control in commercial and industrial settings ===
Insect monitoring traps are available for L. serricorne, which contain specific pheromones to attract male beetles, and help detect and monitor infestations. Infested bulk tobacco in the form of bales or hogsheads can be fumigated using phosphine. Methyl bromide is labeled for tobacco, but is not approved for use by Corresta.

Dosage rates and treatment times with methyl bromide are 20 grams/m^{3} at 21 °C above and 32 grams/m^{3} for 48–72 hours at 7–20 °C. Methyl bromide is not recommended for cigar tobacco since it can produce off odours in the product. Methyl bromide is not acceptable to the tobacco industry.

With phosphine dosage rates are one gram of phosphine (equivalent to a 3-gram table) per m^{3} for 5 days at 12–15 °C and 4 days at 16–20 °C and 3 days above 20 °C. This dosage is not approved for phosphide resistant beetles. All tested beetles in the United States have shown resistance. Corresta Standards require a dosage that attains 600 ppm for 6 days at temperatures > 20 °C.

For localized or household-level infestations the preferred control measure is to find the infested product, dispose of it, and treat around the area with a residual insecticide such as cypermethrin to kill off any remaining beetles.

== Interactions with humans and livestock ==
=== Disease ===
Lasioderma serricorne has been known in rare cases to be associated with an infection called canthariasis, which is a human insectal disease caused by either the adult beetle or their larvae. Canthariasis infections transmitted to humans by the cigarette beetle has been reported in China and Malaysia. Transmission can occur by consuming food materials infested by L. serricorne larvae.
