= Lasioderma haemorrhoidale =

Scientific classification
- Kingdom: Animalia
- Phylum: Arthropoda
- Clade: Pancrustacea
- Class: Insecta
- Order: Coleoptera
- Suborder: Polyphaga
- Superfamily: Bostrichoidea
- Family: Ptinidae
- Subfamily: Xyletininae
- Tribe: Lasiodermini
- Genus: Lasioderma
- Species: L. haemorrhoidale

Binomial name
- Lasioderma haemorrhoidale (Illiger, 1807)

Species of beetle

Lasioderma haemorrhoidale is a species of beetle in the family Ptinidae.

A small beetle unintentionally introduced from the Mediterranean region, it feeds on Maltese star-thistle seed heads, but has had little effect in controlling the plant.
