= Hyphantidium albicostale =

Scientific classification
- Kingdom: Animalia
- Phylum: Arthropoda
- Class: Insecta
- Order: Lepidoptera
- Family: Pyralidae
- Genus: Hyphantidium
- Species: H. albicostale

Binomial name
- Hyphantidium albicostale (Walker, 1863)

Species of moth

Hyphantidium albicostale is a moth of the family Pyralidae first described by Francis Walker in 1863. It is sometimes placed in the genus Ephestia, by considering Hyphantidium as a synonym. It is found in Fiji and probably in Sri Lanka.
