= Megorama viduum =

Scientific classification
- Kingdom: Animalia
- Phylum: Arthropoda
- Clade: Pancrustacea
- Class: Insecta
- Order: Coleoptera
- Suborder: Polyphaga
- Family: Ptinidae
- Tribe: Lasiodermini
- Genus: Megorama
- Species: M. viduum

Binomial name
- Megorama viduum Fall, 1905

Species of beetle

Megorama viduum is a species of beetle in the family Ptinidae. It is found in North America.
