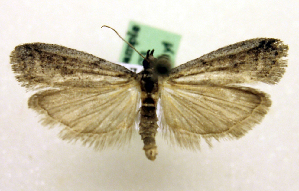

Scientific classification
- Domain: Eukaryota
- Kingdom: Animalia
- Phylum: Arthropoda
- Class: Insecta
- Order: Lepidoptera
- Family: Pyralidae
- Genus: Ephestia
- Species: E. mistralella

Binomial name
- Ephestia mistralella (Millière, 1874)

Synonyms
- Euzophera mistralella Millière, 1874; Ephestia mistralella moebiusi Rebel, 1907

= Ephestia mistralella =

Species of moth

Ephestia mistralella is a species of snout moth in the genus Ephestia. It was described by Pierre Millière in 1874, and is known from France, Germany, Denmark, Fennoscandia, Estonia, Latvia and the Iberian Peninsula.

The wingspan is 14–22 mm.

The larvae feed on Empetrum species, including Empetrum nigrum.
