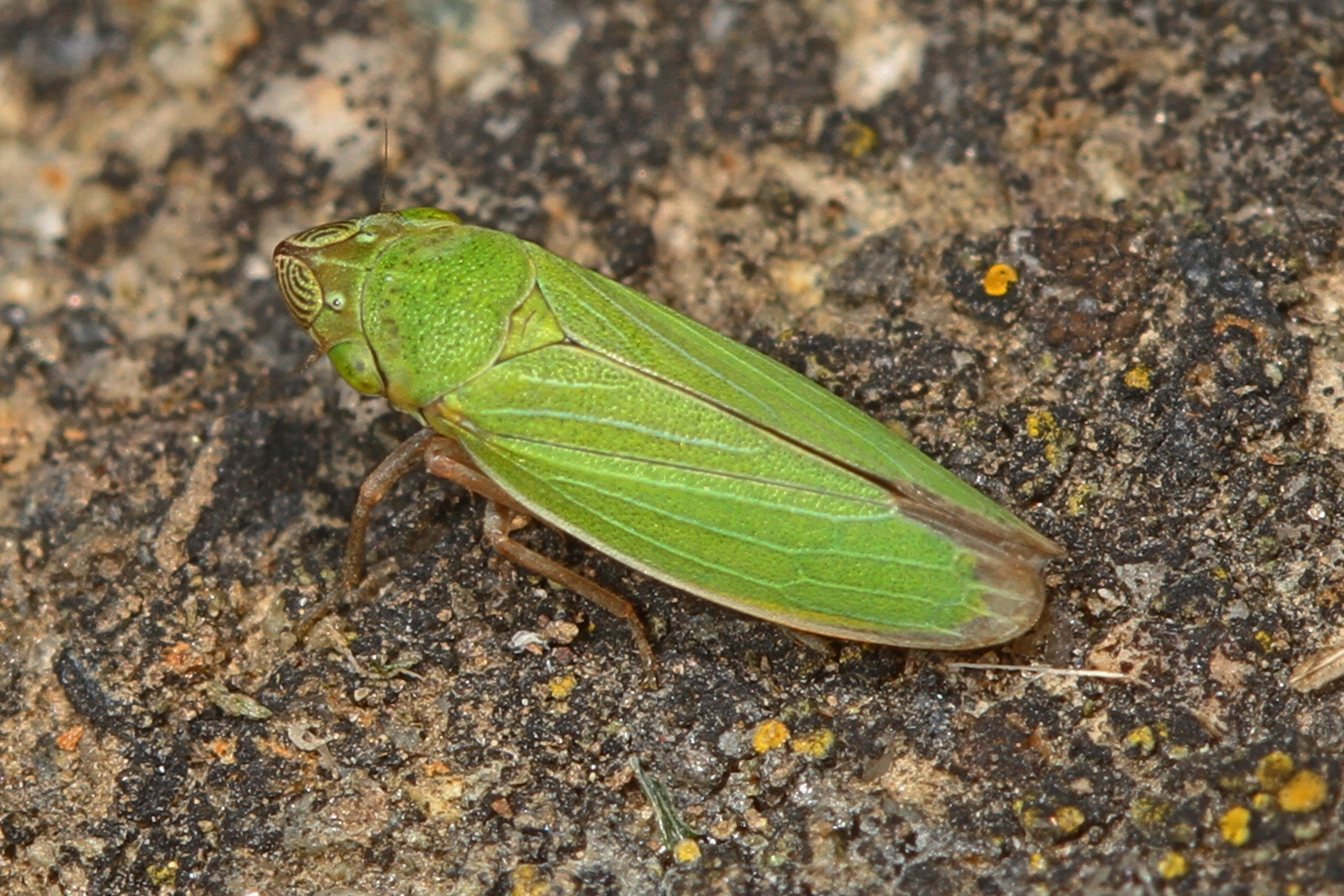

Scientific classification
- Kingdom: Animalia
- Phylum: Arthropoda
- Clade: Pancrustacea
- Class: Insecta
- Order: Hemiptera
- Suborder: Auchenorrhyncha
- Family: Cicadellidae
- Genus: Helochara
- Species: H. communis

Binomial name
- Helochara communis Fitch, 1851

= Helochara communis =

Species of true bug

Helochara communis, the bog leafhopper, is a species of sharpshooter in the family Cicadellidae. It has specialized abdominal organs called mycetomes within its abdomen, containing multiple bacterial symbionts.

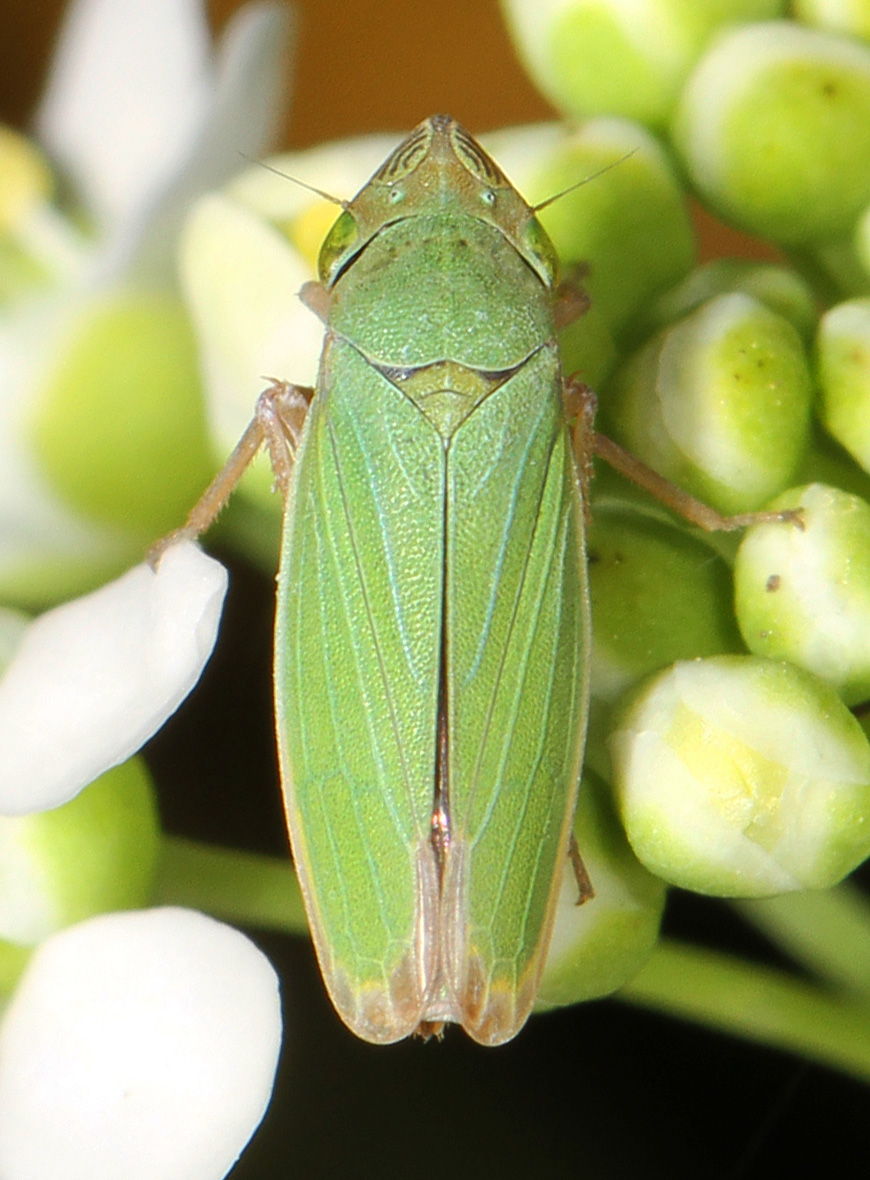
Bog leafhopper, Helochara communis

It feeds primarily on sedges, rushes, and various wetland grasses found in marshy or boggy habitats.
