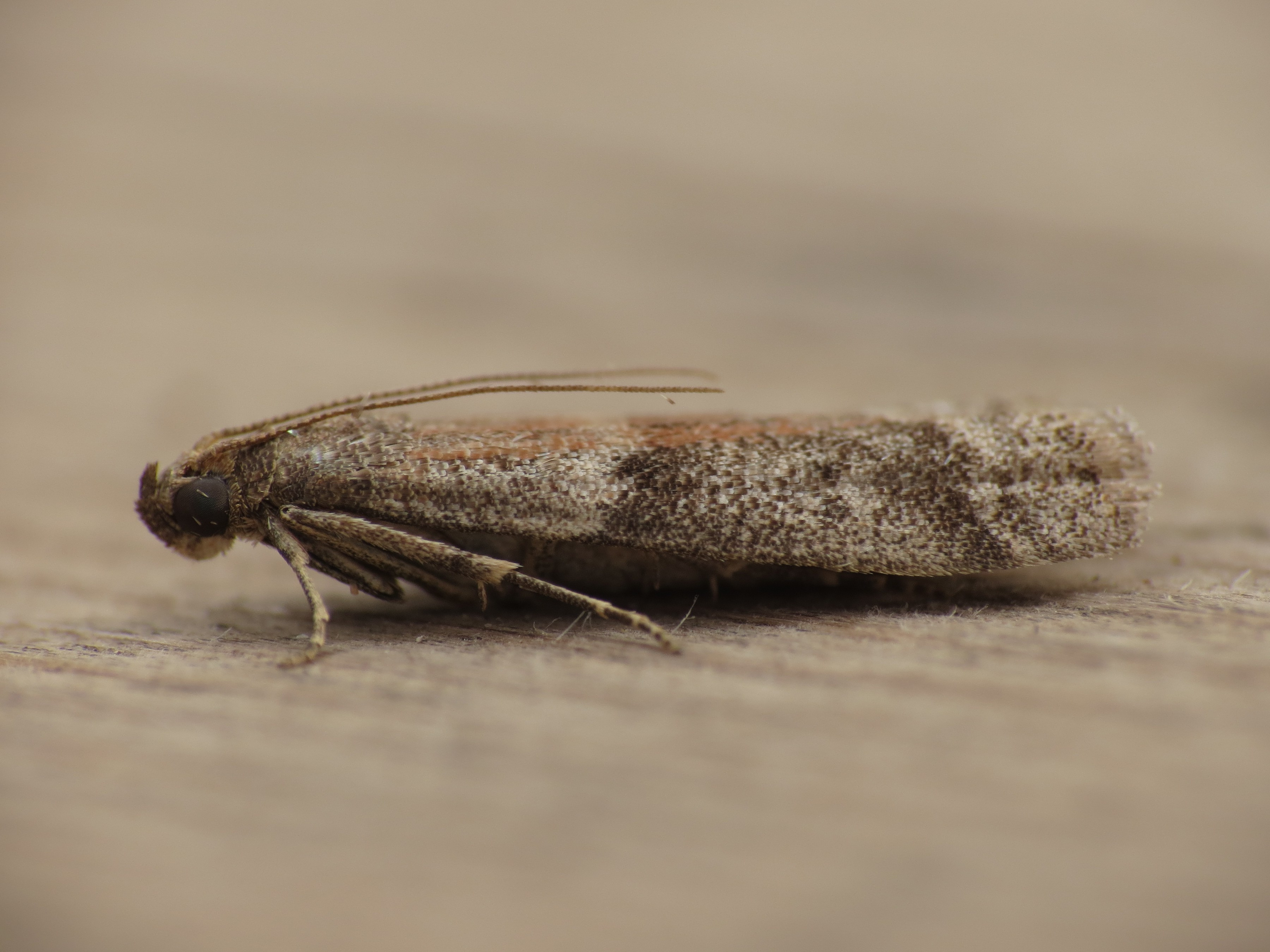

Scientific classification
- Domain: Eukaryota
- Kingdom: Animalia
- Phylum: Arthropoda
- Class: Insecta
- Order: Lepidoptera
- Family: Pyralidae
- Genus: Ephestia
- Species: E. unicolorella

Binomial name
- Ephestia unicolorella Staudinger, 1881

Synonyms
- Xenephestia intermediella Amsel, 1961; Ephestia vitivora Filipjev, 1931; Ephestia woodiella Richards & Thomson, 1932; Heterographis bimaculatella D. Lucas, 1955

= Ephestia unicolorella =

Species of moth

Ephestia unicolorella is a species of snout moth in the genus Ephestia. It was first described by Staudinger in 1881, and is known from Iran, Turkey, Morocco, Azerbaijan and most of Europe.

The wingspan is 10–13 mm.

The larvae feed on dried plant matter.

== Subspecies ==
- Ephestia unicolorella unicolorella
- Ephestia unicolorella woodiella Richards & Thomson, 1932 (Europe)
