= Ephestia abnormalella =

Scientific classification
- Domain: Eukaryota
- Kingdom: Animalia
- Phylum: Arthropoda
- Class: Insecta
- Order: Lepidoptera
- Family: Pyralidae
- Genus: Ephestia
- Species: E. abnormalella

Binomial name
- Ephestia abnormalella Ragonot, 1887

Species of moth

Ephestia abnormalella is a species of snout moth in the genus Ephestia. It was described by Émile Louis Ragonot in 1887, and is known from Uzbekistan.
