= Cryptoblabes hemigypsa =

Scientific classification
- Domain: Eukaryota
- Kingdom: Animalia
- Phylum: Arthropoda
- Class: Insecta
- Order: Lepidoptera
- Family: Pyralidae
- Genus: Cryptoblabes
- Species: C. hemigypsa

Binomial name
- Cryptoblabes hemigypsa Turner, 1913

Species of moth

Cryptoblabes hemigypsa is a species of snout moth in the genus Cryptoblabes. It was described by Turner in 1913, and is known from Australia.
