= Cryptoblabes ferrealis =

Scientific classification
- Domain: Eukaryota
- Kingdom: Animalia
- Phylum: Arthropoda
- Class: Insecta
- Order: Lepidoptera
- Family: Pyralidae
- Genus: Cryptoblabes
- Species: C. ferrealis

Binomial name
- Cryptoblabes ferrealis Lower, 1902

Species of moth

Cryptoblabes ferrealis is a species of snout moth in the genus Cryptoblabes. It was described by Oswald Bertram Lower in 1902, and is known from Australia.
