= Cryptoblabes euraphella =

Scientific classification
- Kingdom: Animalia
- Phylum: Arthropoda
- Class: Insecta
- Order: Lepidoptera
- Family: Pyralidae
- Genus: Cryptoblabes
- Species: C. euraphella

Binomial name
- Cryptoblabes euraphella (Meyrick, 1879)

Synonyms
- Nephopteryx euraphella Meyrick, 1879

Species of moth

Cryptoblabes euraphella is a species of snout moth in the genus Cryptoblabes. It was described by Edward Meyrick in 1879, and is known from Australia.
