= Cryptoblabes proleucella =

Scientific classification
- Kingdom: Animalia
- Phylum: Arthropoda
- Class: Insecta
- Order: Lepidoptera
- Family: Pyralidae
- Genus: Cryptoblabes
- Species: C. proleucella

Binomial name
- Cryptoblabes proleucella Hampson, 1896

Species of moth

Cryptoblabes proleucella is a species of moth of the family Pyralidae described by George Hampson in 1896. It is found in India, the Malay Archipelago, Samoa and Taiwan.

The larvae are predators of Hemiptera species.
