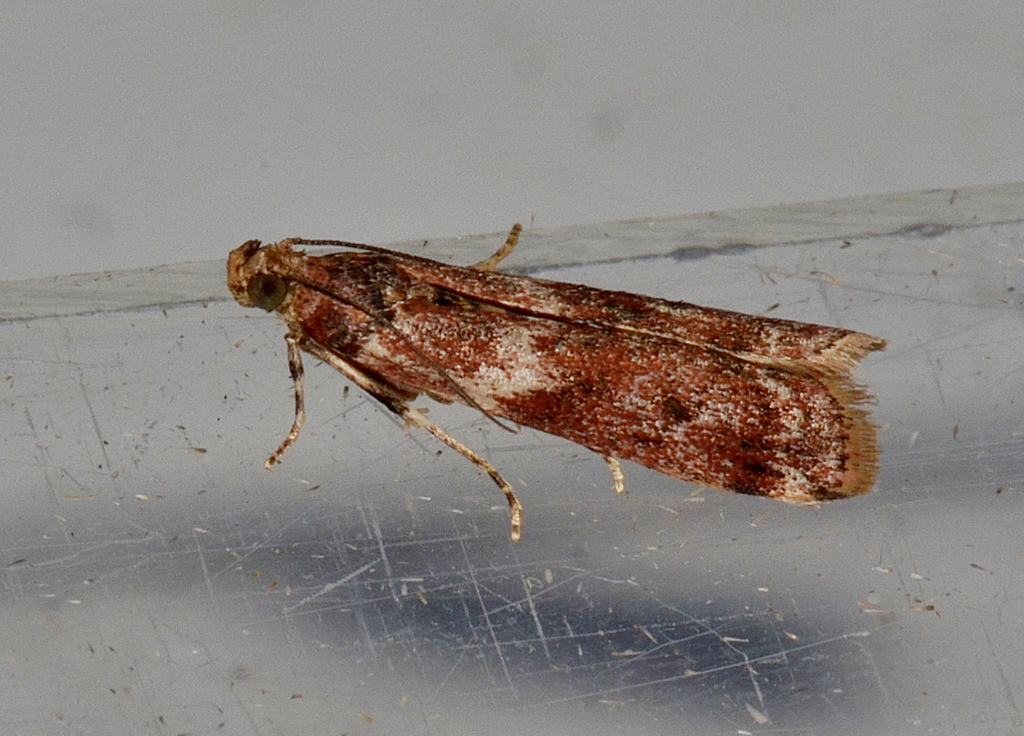

Scientific classification
- Kingdom: Animalia
- Phylum: Arthropoda
- Class: Insecta
- Order: Lepidoptera
- Family: Pyralidae
- Genus: Cryptoblabes
- Species: C. plagioleuca

Binomial name
- Cryptoblabes plagioleuca Turner, 1904

Synonyms
- Cryptoblabes centroleuca Lower, 1905; Eurhodope ardescens Meyrick, 1929

= Cryptoblabes plagioleuca =

Species of moth

Cryptoblabes plagioleuca, the mango-flower moth, blossom moth or mango-flower webber, is a species of snout moth in the genus Cryptoblabes. It was described by Turner in 1904. It is found from Indonesia (Sumatra), New Hebrides, Australia and the Society Islands.
