= Ephestia animella =

Scientific classification
- Kingdom: Animalia
- Phylum: Arthropoda
- Clade: Pancrustacea
- Class: Insecta
- Order: Lepidoptera
- Family: Pyralidae
- Genus: Ephestia
- Species: E. animella

Binomial name
- Ephestia animella Nupponen & Junnilainen, 1998

Species of moth

Ephestia animella is a species of snout moth in the genus Ephestia. It was described by Kari Nupponen and Jari Junnilainen in 1998 and is known from Russia. It has been recorded at an elevation range of 900 to 1000 metres.
