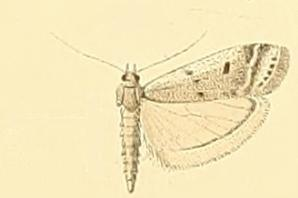

Scientific classification
- Kingdom: Animalia
- Phylum: Arthropoda
- Class: Insecta
- Order: Lepidoptera
- Family: Pyralidae
- Genus: Ephestia
- Species: E. disparella

Binomial name
- Ephestia disparella Hampson, 1901

= Ephestia disparella =

Species of moth

Ephestia disparella is a species of snout moth in the genus Ephestia. It was described by George Hampson in 1901. It is found in southern Europe.
