= Cryptoblabes ephestialis =

Scientific classification
- Kingdom: Animalia
- Phylum: Arthropoda
- Class: Insecta
- Order: Lepidoptera
- Family: Pyralidae
- Genus: Cryptoblabes
- Species: C. ephestialis

Binomial name
- Cryptoblabes ephestialis Hampson, 1903

Synonyms
- Euzopherodes ephestialis Hampson, 1903

Species of moth

Cryptoblabes ephestialis is a moth of the family Pyralidae first described by George Hampson in 1903. It is found in India and Sri Lanka. The caterpillar is a pest on Ricinus communis.
