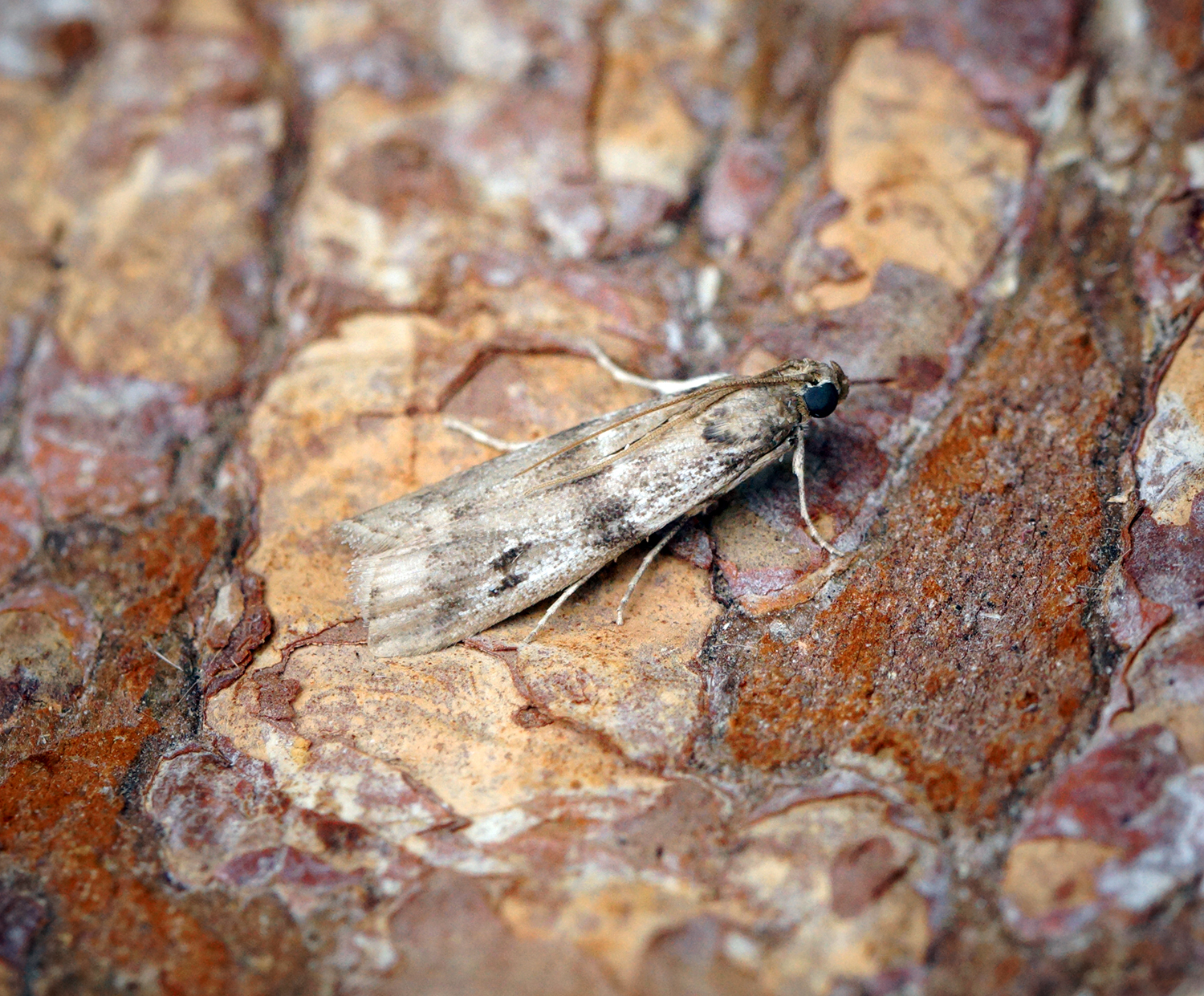

Scientific classification
- Kingdom: Animalia
- Phylum: Arthropoda
- Clade: Pancrustacea
- Class: Insecta
- Order: Lepidoptera
- Family: Pyralidae
- Genus: Ephestia
- Species: E. welseriella

Binomial name
- Ephestia welseriella (Zeller, 1848)

Synonyms
- Myelois welseriella Zeller, 1848; Myelois tephrinella Lederer, 1870

= Ephestia welseriella =

Species of moth

Ephestia welseriella is a species of snout moth in the genus Ephestia. It was described by Zeller in 1848. It is found from the Iberian Peninsula north to France and Germany and east to Ukraine and southern Russia.

The wingspan is 18–24 mm. Adults are on wing from May to August.

The larvae feed in the bulbs of Allium species.
