= Cryptoblabes adoceta =

Scientific classification
- Kingdom: Animalia
- Phylum: Arthropoda
- Clade: Pancrustacea
- Class: Insecta
- Order: Lepidoptera
- Family: Pyralidae
- Genus: Cryptoblabes
- Species: C. adoceta

Binomial name
- Cryptoblabes adoceta Turner, 1904

Species of moth

Cryptoblabes adoceta, the sorghum head moth, is a species of snout moth in the genus Cryptoblabes. It was described by Turner in 1904 and is found in the Northern Territory, Queensland in Australia and in Hawaii (Maui).

The wingspan is about 15 mm (0.59 in).

The larvae feed on Sorghum bicolor, feeding from within the seed heads of their host plant.
