= Ephestia inquietella =

Scientific classification
- Kingdom: Animalia
- Phylum: Arthropoda
- Class: Insecta
- Order: Lepidoptera
- Family: Pyralidae
- Genus: Ephestia
- Species: E. inquietella

Binomial name
- Ephestia inquietella Zerny, 1932

Species of moth

Ephestia inquietella is a species of snout moth in the genus Ephestia. It was described by Hans Zerny, in 1932. It is found in Morocco and Spain.
