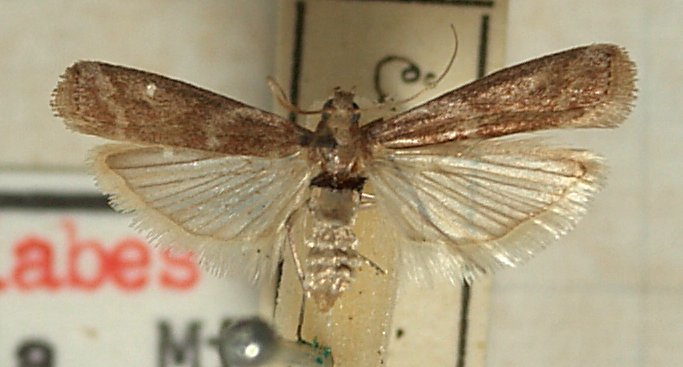
- Honeydew moth (C. gnidiella) specimen

Scientific classification
- Kingdom: Animalia
- Phylum: Arthropoda
- Clade: Pancrustacea
- Class: Insecta
- Order: Lepidoptera
- Family: Pyralidae
- Subfamily: Phycitinae
- Genus: Cryptoblabes; Zeller, 1848

Type species
- Ancylosis rutilella Zeller, 1839

Synonyms
- Albinia Briosi, 1877 (non Robineau-Desvoidy, 1830: preoccupied)

= Cryptoblabes =

Genus of moths

Cryptoblabes is a genus of small moths belonging to the snout moth family (Pyralidae). They are the type genus of the Cryptoblabini tribe of the huge snout moth subfamily Phycitinae. At least one representative of this genus nowadays occurs in many parts of the world, though this is the result of accidental introductions by humans; most species of Cryptoblabes are fairly restricted in range.

Cryptoblabes species can be hard to tell apart from related moths in the field. The lack of forewing vein 7 but no other (though veins 4 and 5 may appear as one proximally) is characteristic at least in some species. The caterpillars are found on a wide range of flowering plants where they eat living overground parts (and sometimes dead leaves); some are highly polyphagous and may occasionally become pests on such diverse crops as Citrus, mango (Mangifera indica), apple guava (Psidium guajava), Tamarindus and common wheat (Triticum aestivum).

== Selected species ==
Species of Cryptoblabes include:

- Cryptoblabes adoceta Turner, 1904
- Cryptoblabes albocostalis (Lucas, 1892)
- Cryptoblabes alphitias Turner, 1913
- Cryptoblabes amphicharis Meyrick, 1933
- Cryptoblabes angustipennella Ragonot, 1888
- Cryptoblabes ardescens (Meyrick, 1929)
- Cryptoblabes bistriga (Haworth, 1811)
- Cryptoblabes ephestialis Hampson, 1903
- Cryptoblabes euraphella (Meyrick, 1879)
- Cryptoblabes ferrealis Lower, 1902 (tentatively placed here)
- Cryptoblabes gnidiella (Millière, 1867) – honeydew moth, Christmasberry moth
- Cryptoblabes hemigypsa Turner, 1913
- Cryptoblabes mannsheimsi Roesler, 1969
- Cryptoblabes myosticta (Hampson, 1903)
- Cryptoblabes plagioleuca Turner, 1904
- Cryptoblabes poliella (Lower, 1905)
- Cryptoblabes proleucella Hampson, 1896
- Cryptoblabes trabeata Meyrick, 1932
