= Cryptoblabes poliella =

Scientific classification
- Domain: Eukaryota
- Kingdom: Animalia
- Phylum: Arthropoda
- Class: Insecta
- Order: Lepidoptera
- Family: Pyralidae
- Genus: Cryptoblabes
- Species: C. poliella

Binomial name
- Cryptoblabes poliella (Lower, 1905)

Synonyms
- Ephestiopsis poliella Lower, 1905

Species of moth

Cryptoblabes poliella is a species of snout moth in the genus Cryptoblabes. It was described by Oswald Bertram Lower in 1905, and is known from Australia.
