= Ephestia cypriusella =

Scientific classification
- Domain: Eukaryota
- Kingdom: Animalia
- Phylum: Arthropoda
- Class: Insecta
- Order: Lepidoptera
- Family: Pyralidae
- Genus: Ephestia
- Species: E. cypriusella

Binomial name
- Ephestia cypriusella (Roesler, 1965)

Synonyms
- Anagasta cypriusella Roesler, 1965

Species of moth

Ephestia cypriusella is a species of snout moth in the genus Ephestia. It was described by Roesler in 1965, and is known from Cyprus, Greece and Turkey.
