= Cryptoblabes myosticta =

Scientific classification
- Kingdom: Animalia
- Phylum: Arthropoda
- Class: Insecta
- Order: Lepidoptera
- Family: Pyralidae
- Genus: Cryptoblabes
- Species: C. myosticta

Binomial name
- Cryptoblabes myosticta (Hampson, 1903)

Synonyms
- Etiella myosticta Hampson, 1903

Species of moth

Cryptoblabes myosticta is a species of snout moth in the genus Cryptoblabes. It was described by George Hampson in 1903. It is found in India.
