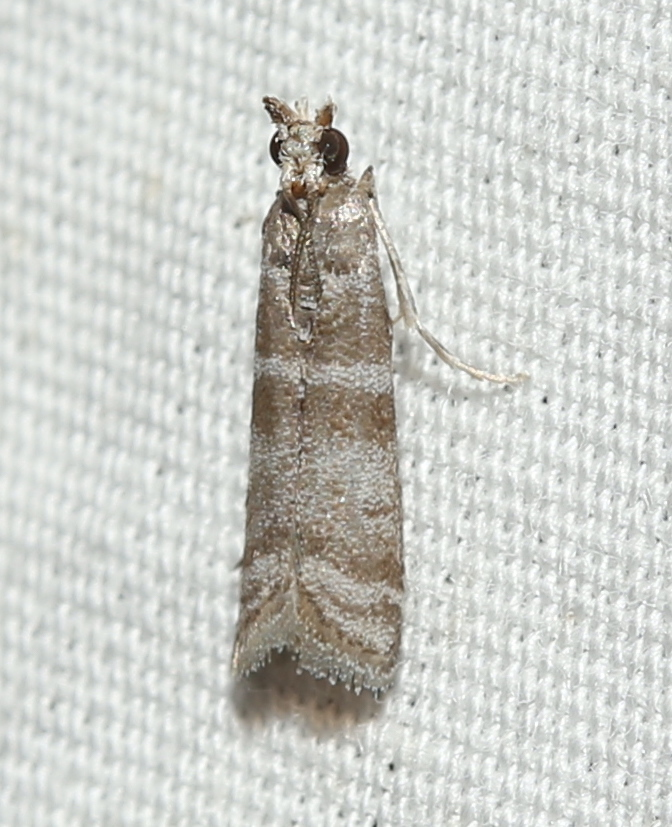

Scientific classification
- Kingdom: Animalia
- Phylum: Arthropoda
- Class: Insecta
- Order: Lepidoptera
- Family: Pyralidae
- Genus: Ephestia
- Species: E. columbiella

Binomial name
- Ephestia columbiella Neunzig, 1990

= Ephestia columbiella =

Species of moth

Ephestia columbiella is a species of snout moth in the genus Ephestia. It was described by Herbert H. Neunzig in 1990 and is known from North America, including Alabama, Florida, South Carolina and West Virginia.
