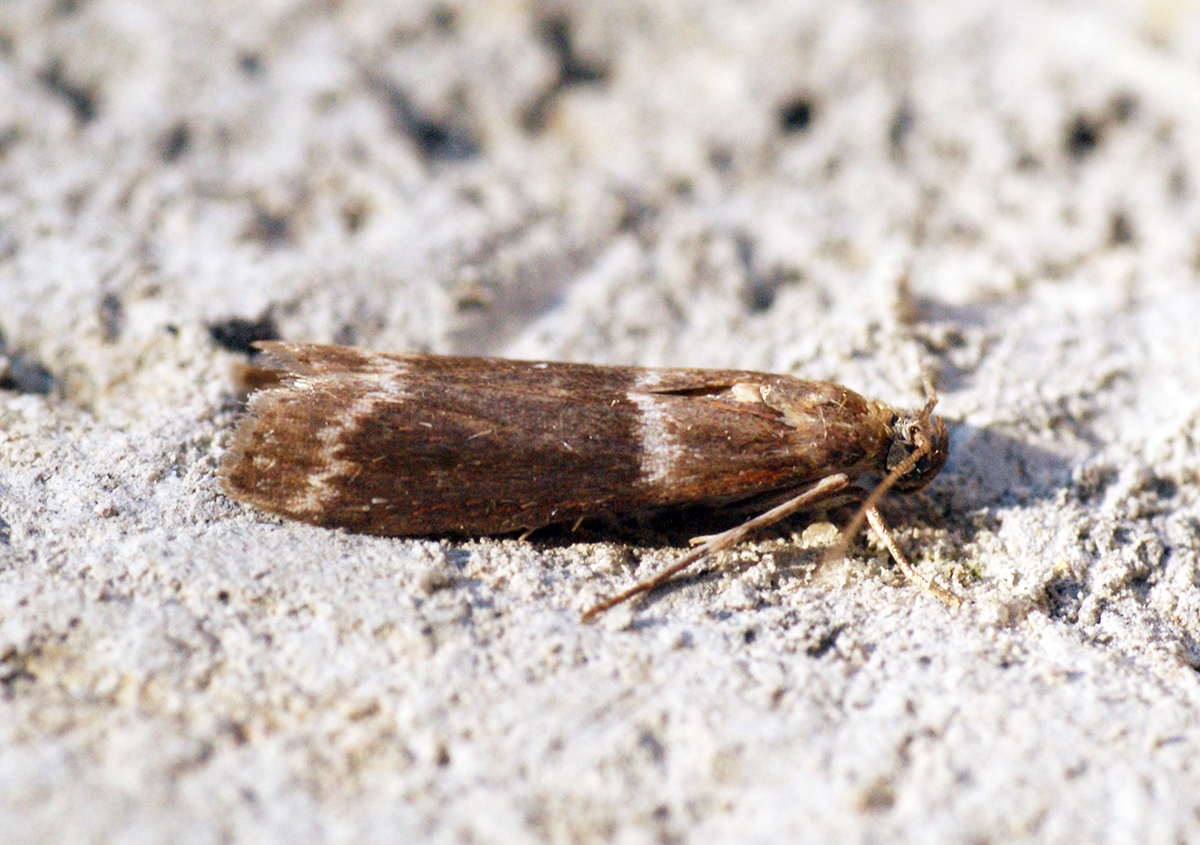

Scientific classification
- Kingdom: Animalia
- Phylum: Arthropoda
- Clade: Pancrustacea
- Class: Insecta
- Order: Lepidoptera
- Family: Pyralidae
- Genus: Cryptoblabes
- Species: C. bistriga

Binomial name
- Cryptoblabes bistriga (Haworth, 1811)

Synonyms
- Phycis bistriga Haworth, 1811; Ancylosis rutilella Zeller, 1839; Cryptoblabes loxiella Ragonot, 1887; Ilithyia obsoletella Heinemann, 1865

= Cryptoblabes bistriga =

Species of moth

Cryptoblabes bistriga is a species of snout moth in the genus Cryptoblabes. It was described by Adrian Hardy Haworth in 1811. It is found in most of Europe, except Portugal, parts of the Balkan Peninsula and Ukraine.

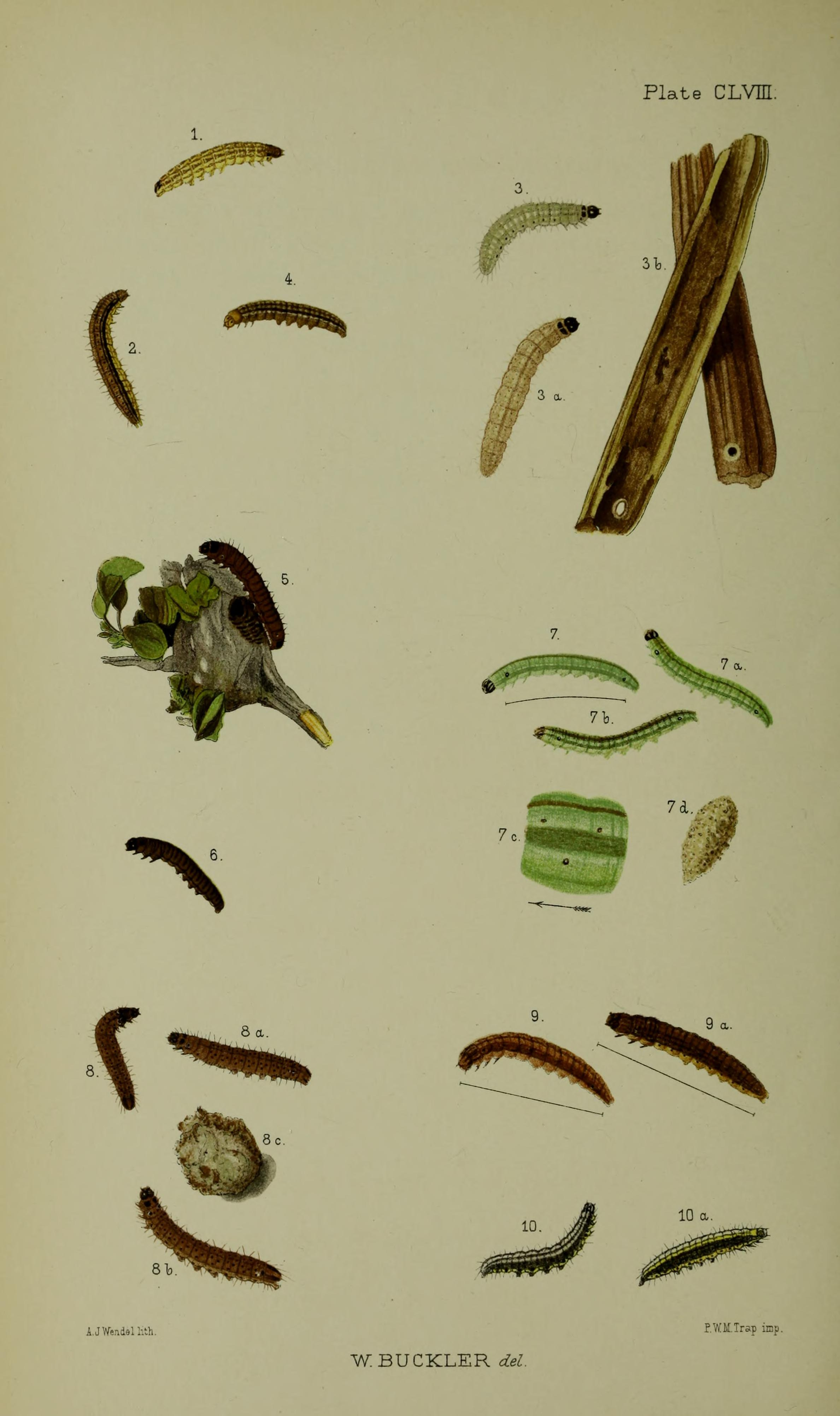
Fig. 2 larva after final moult

The wingspan is 18–20 mm.The forewings are fuscous, the veins broadly suffused with fuscous-reddish; lines whitish, first at 4, rather thick, straight, second very near termen, serrate; discal dots obscurely indicated; a whitish terminal suffusion. Hindwings light fuscous. Larva pale brown, darker-freckled; dorsal line darker; subdorsal and lateral blackish-brown; spiracular ochreous-whitish, double; a brown black-centred lateral spot on 3 and 12; head light brown: in folded leaves of oak and alder; 9, 10.

They are on wing from late June to July.

The larvae feed on the leaves of various trees, including Quercus, Alnus and Myrica species. They feed from within a folded leaf.
