= Megorama =

Scientific classification
- Kingdom: Animalia
- Phylum: Arthropoda
- Class: Insecta
- Order: Coleoptera
- Suborder: Polyphaga
- Family: Ptinidae
- Tribe: Lasiodermini
- Genus: Megorama; Fall, 1905

Genus of beetles

Megorama is a genus of death-watch and spider beetles in the family Ptinidae. There are about five described species in Megorama.

== Species ==
These five species belong to the genus Megorama:

- Megorama frontale (LeConte, 1878)^{i c g b}
- Megorama ingens Fall, 1905^{i c g b}
- Megorama simplex (LeConte, 1865)^{i c g}
- Megorama subserratum Israelson, 1974^{g}
- Megorama viduum Fall, 1905^{i c g b}

Data sources: i = ITIS, c = Catalogue of Life, g = GBIF, b = Bugguide.net
