= Ephestia rectivittella =

Scientific classification
- Domain: Eukaryota
- Kingdom: Animalia
- Phylum: Arthropoda
- Class: Insecta
- Order: Lepidoptera
- Family: Pyralidae
- Genus: Ephestia
- Species: E. rectivittella

Binomial name
- Ephestia rectivittella Ragonot, 1901

Species of moth

Ephestia rectivittella is a species of snout moth in the genus Ephestia. It was described by Ragonot in 1901, and is known from Madagascar.
