= Lasioderma turkmenicum =

Scientific classification
- Kingdom: Animalia
- Phylum: Arthropoda
- Class: Insecta
- Order: Coleoptera
- Suborder: Polyphaga
- Family: Ptinidae
- Genus: Lasioderma
- Species: L. turkmenicum

Binomial name
- Lasioderma turkmenicum Toskina, 1999

Species of beetle

Lasioderma turkmenicum is a species of beetles in the genus Lasioderma of the family Ptinidae.
