= Cryptoblabes angustipennella =

Scientific classification
- Domain: Eukaryota
- Kingdom: Animalia
- Phylum: Arthropoda
- Class: Insecta
- Order: Lepidoptera
- Family: Pyralidae
- Genus: Cryptoblabes
- Species: C. angustipennella

Binomial name
- Cryptoblabes angustipennella Ragonot, 1888

Species of moth

Cryptoblabes angustipennella, the earhead caterpillar, is a moth of the family Pyralidae. It was first described by Émile Louis Ragonot in 1888. It is found in India and Sri Lanka. The caterpillar is a pest of Eleusine coracana.
