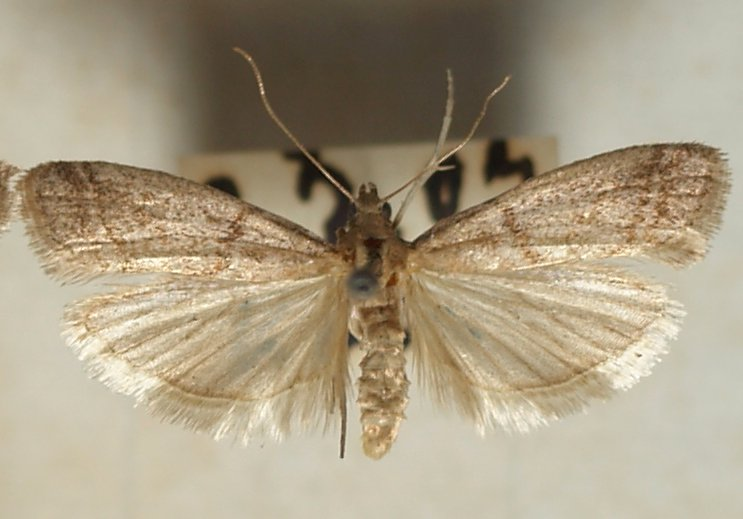

Scientific classification
- Kingdom: Animalia
- Phylum: Arthropoda
- Clade: Pancrustacea
- Class: Insecta
- Order: Lepidoptera
- Family: Pyralidae
- Genus: Ephestia
- Species: E. elutella

Binomial name
- Ephestia elutella (Hübner, 1796)

Synonyms
- Numerous, see text

= Ephestia elutella =

Cacao moth

Species of moth

Ephestia elutella, the cacao moth, tobacco moth or warehouse moth, is a small moth of the family Pyralidae. It is probably native to Europe, but has been transported widely, even to Australia. A subspecies is E. e. pterogrisella.

== Description ==
The wingspan is 14–20 mm. Forewings in male are less elongate, [ than other Ephestia ] with costal fold enclosing flocculent scales; grey, sprinkled with whitish and mixed with dark fuscous, towards dorsum often also with ferruginous-reddish; lines pale, dark-edged, first straight, rather oblique, second almost straight; two darker transversely placed discal dots. Hindwings pale fuscous, anteriorly thinly scaled, in 6 with median and subdorsal whitish-ochreous basal hair tufts. Larva brown-whitish; dots brown; head and plate of 2 reddish brown: on biscuit, chocolate, figs

This moth flies throughout the warmer months, e.g. from the end of April to October in Belgium and the Netherlands.

== Infestation ==
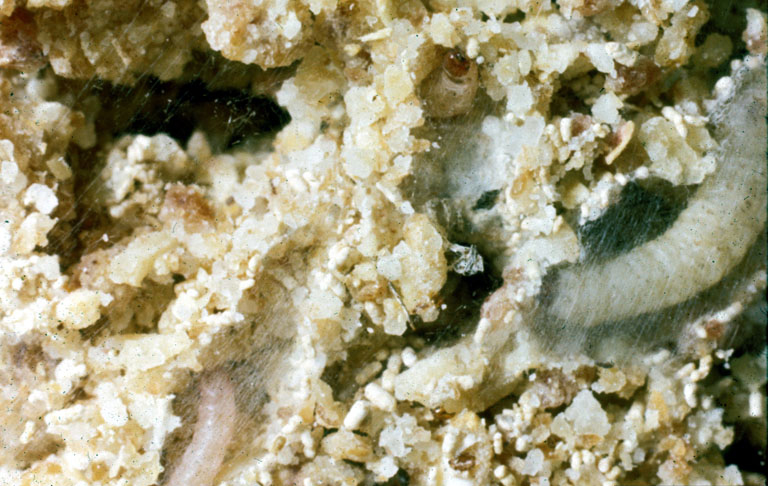
Caterpillars of Ephestia elutella (tobacco moth)

The caterpillars of Ephestia elutella are often considered a pest, as they feed on dry plant produce, such as cocoa beans and tobacco, as well as cereals and dried fruit and nuts. Less usual foods include dried-out meat and animal carcasses, specimens in insect collections, and dry wood.

Tobacco and its related products can be infested by Lasioderma serricorne (tobacco beetle) and Ephestia elutella, which are the most widespread and damaging stored product pests affecting the tobacco industry. Infestation can range from the tobacco cultivated in the fields to the leaves used for manufacturing cigars, cigarillos, cigarettes, etc.

== Taxonomy ==
This species has been known under a number of junior synonyms:

- Ephestia amarella Dyar, 1904
- Ephestia icosiella Ragonot, 1888
- Ephestia infumatella Ragonot, 1887
- Ephestia roxburghi (lapsus)
- Ephestia roxburghii Gregson, 1873
- Ephestia roxburgii (lapsus)
- Ephestia uniformata Dufrane, 1942 (variety)
- Homoeosoma affusella Ragonot, 1888
- Hyphantidium sericarium Scott, 1859
- Phycis angusta (Haworth, 1811)
- Phycis elutea Haworth, 1811; (unjustified emendation)
- Phycis rufa Haworth, 1811
- Phycis semirufa Haworth, 1811
- Tinea elutella Hübner, 1796
