= Cryptoblabes alphitias =

Scientific classification
- Domain: Eukaryota
- Kingdom: Animalia
- Phylum: Arthropoda
- Class: Insecta
- Order: Lepidoptera
- Family: Pyralidae
- Genus: Cryptoblabes
- Species: C. alphitias

Binomial name
- Cryptoblabes alphitias Turner, 1913

Species of moth

Cryptoblabes alphitias is a species of snout moth in the genus Cryptoblabes. It was described by Alfred Jefferis Turner in 1913. It is found in Australia. The holotype (female) was collected in Kuranda, Queensland.
