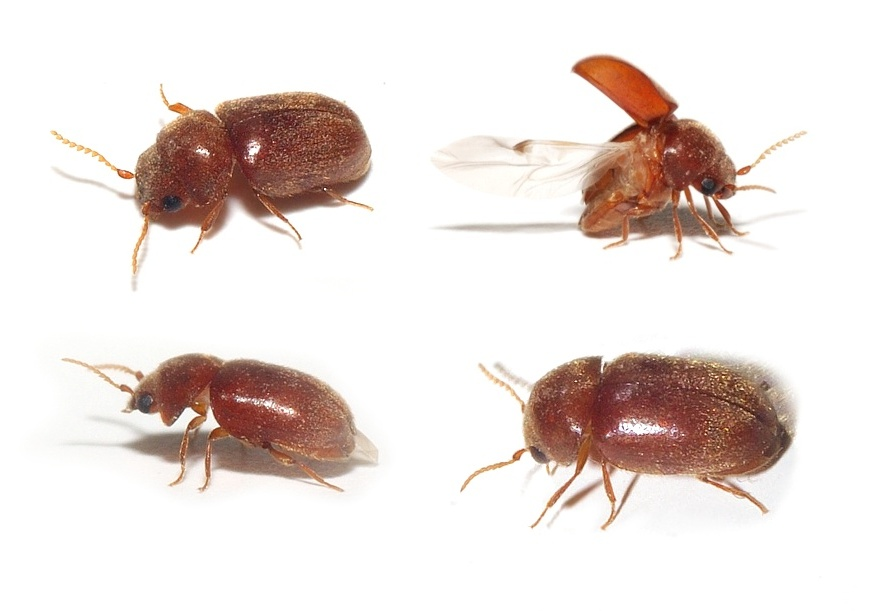
- Lasioderma serricorne

Scientific classification
- Kingdom: Animalia
- Phylum: Arthropoda
- Clade: Pancrustacea
- Class: Insecta
- Order: Coleoptera
- Suborder: Polyphaga
- Family: Ptinidae
- Tribe: Lasiodermini
- Genus: Lasioderma; Stephens, 1835

Synonyms
- Hypora Jacquelin du Val, 1860; Pseudochina Mulsant and Rey, 1864

= Lasioderma =

Genus of beetles

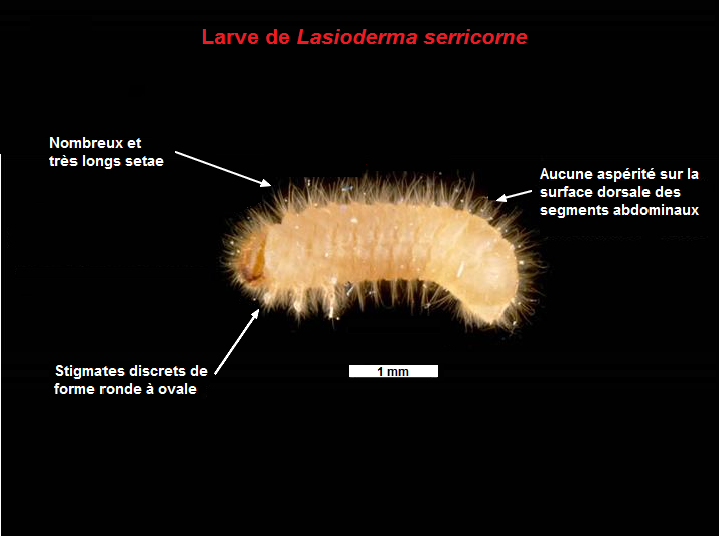
Lasioderma serricorne, larva

Lasioderma is a genus of beetles in the family Ptinidae. As of 1990, there were over 50 species in the genus.

== Species ==
These 36 species belong to the genus Lasioderma:

- Lasioderma aterrimum Roubal, 1916^{g}
- Lasioderma atrorubrum Toskina, 1999^{g}
- Lasioderma atrum Toskina, 1999^{g}
- Lasioderma baudii Schilsky, 1899^{g}
- Lasioderma bubalus Fairmaire, 1860^{g}
- Lasioderma corsicum Schilsky, 1899^{g}
- Lasioderma desectum (Wollaston, 1861)^{g}
- Lasioderma dolini Toskina, 2011
- Lasioderma excavatum (Wollaston, 1861)^{g}
- Lasioderma falli Pic, 1905^{i c g b}
- Lasioderma flavicollis (Wollaston, 1865)^{g}
- Lasioderma formosanum Pic, 1943^{g}
- Lasioderma haemorrhoidale (Illiger, 1807)^{i c g b}
- Lasioderma hemiptychoides Fall, 1905^{i c g b}
- Lasioderma kiesenwetteri Schilsky, 1899^{g}
- Lasioderma laeve (Illiger, 1807)^{g}
- Lasioderma latitans (Wollaston, 1861)^{g}
- Lasioderma melanocephalum Schilsky, 1899^{g}
- Lasioderma micans (Mannerheim, 1829)^{g}
- Lasioderma minutum Lindberg, 1950^{g}
- Lasioderma morulum Toskina, 2011
- Lasioderma mulsanti Schilsky, 1899^{g}
- Lasioderma multipunctatum Toskina, 1999^{g}
- Lasioderma obscurum (Solsky, 1868)^{g}
- Lasioderma prolixum Toskina, 2011
- Lasioderma punctulatum Reitter, 1884^{g}
- Lasioderma redtenbacheri (Bach, 1852)^{g}
- Lasioderma semirufulum Reitter, 1897^{g}
- Lasioderma semirufum Fall, 1905^{i c g}
- Lasioderma serricorne (Fabricius, 1792)^{i c g b} (cigarette beetle)
- Lasioderma sparsum Toskina, 2011
- Lasioderma striola (Rey, 1892)^{g}
- Lasioderma tauricum Toskina, 2011
- Lasioderma thoracicum (Morawitz, 1861)^{g}
- Lasioderma triste Roubal, 1919^{g}
- Lasioderma turkmenicum Toskina, 1999
- Lasioderma turkestanicum Reitter, 1901^{g}

Data sources: i = ITIS, c = Catalogue of Life, g = GBIF, b = Bugguide.net
