= Cryptoblabes albocostalis =

Scientific classification
- Kingdom: Animalia
- Phylum: Arthropoda
- Class: Insecta
- Order: Lepidoptera
- Family: Pyralidae
- Genus: Cryptoblabes
- Species: C. albocostalis

Binomial name
- Cryptoblabes albocostalis (T. P. Lucas, 1892)

Synonyms
- Homoeosoma albocostalis T. P. Lucas, 1892; Cryptoblabes albicostalis

Species of moth

Cryptoblabes albocostalis is a species of snout moth in the genus Cryptoblabes. It was described by Thomas Pennington Lucas in 1892 and is known from Australia.
