= Cryptoblabes trabeata =

Scientific classification
- Kingdom: Animalia
- Phylum: Arthropoda
- Class: Insecta
- Order: Lepidoptera
- Family: Pyralidae
- Genus: Cryptoblabes
- Species: C. trabeata

Binomial name
- Cryptoblabes trabeata Meyrick, 1932

Species of moth

Cryptoblabes trabeata is a species of moth of the family Pyralidae described by Edward Meyrick in 1932. It is found in Fiji and Samoa.
