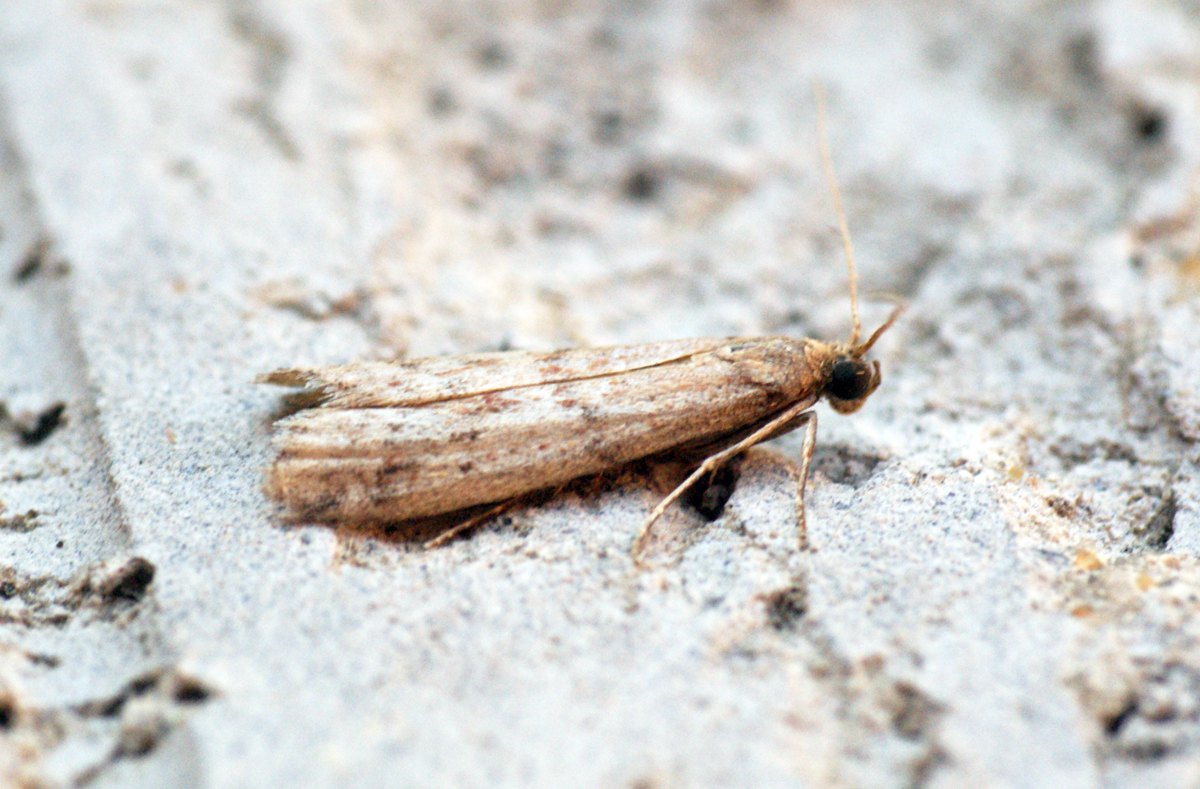

Scientific classification
- Domain: Eukaryota
- Kingdom: Animalia
- Phylum: Arthropoda
- Class: Insecta
- Order: Lepidoptera
- Family: Pyralidae
- Genus: Ephestia
- Species: E. parasitella

Binomial name
- Ephestia parasitella Staudinger, 1859

= Ephestia parasitella =

Species of moth

Ephestia parasitella is a species of snout moth in the genus Ephestia. It was described by Staudinger in 1859, and is known from Spain, France, the Benelux, Croatia and Russia.

The wingspan is 14–20 mm. Adults are on wing from April to September.
