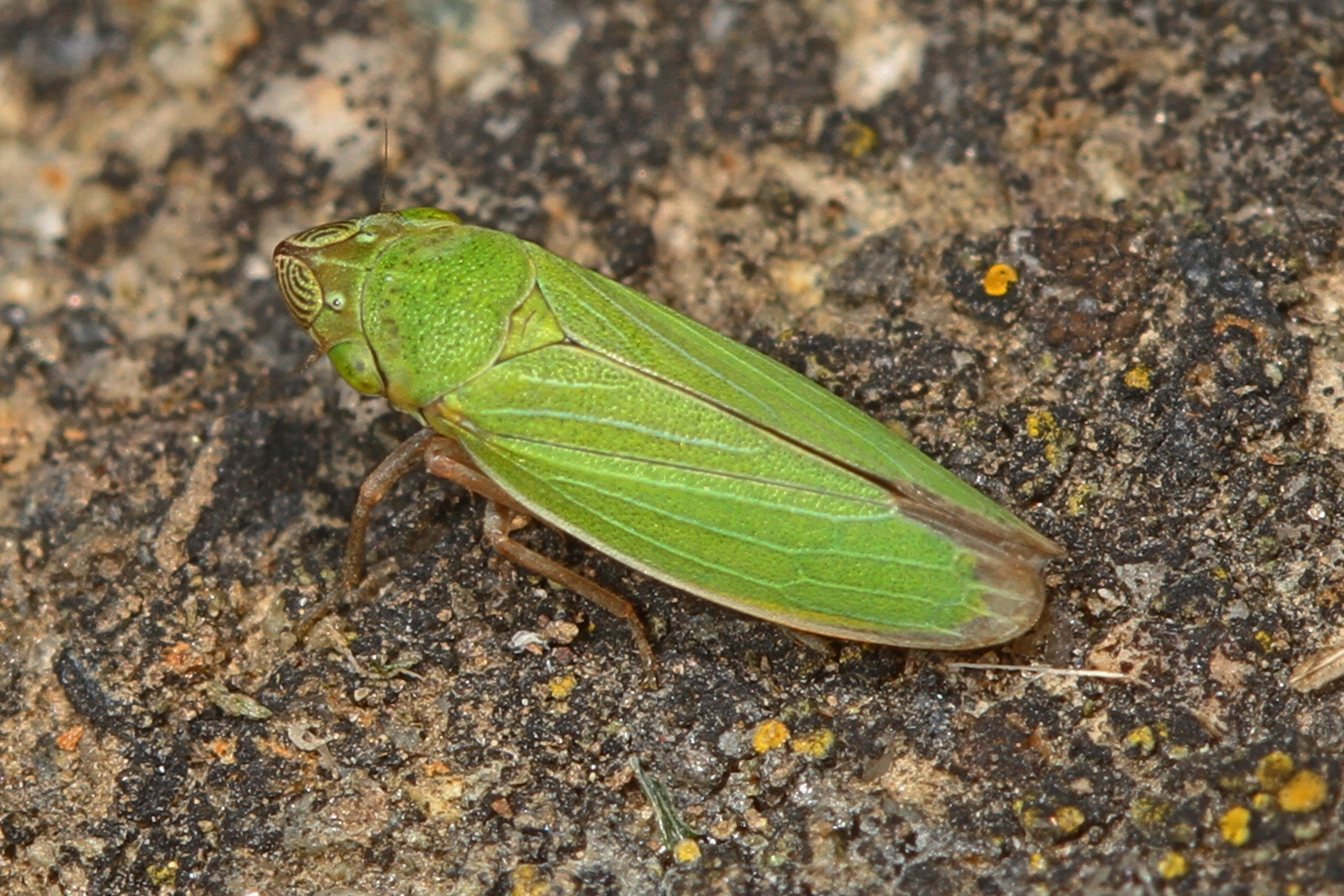
- Helochara communis

Scientific classification
- Domain: Eukaryota
- Kingdom: Animalia
- Phylum: Arthropoda
- Class: Insecta
- Order: Hemiptera
- Suborder: Auchenorrhyncha
- Family: Cicadellidae
- Tribe: Cicadellini
- Genus: Helochara; Fitch, 1851

= Helochara =

Genus of true bugs

Helochara is a genus of leafhoppers in the family Cicadellidae. There are about six described species in Helochara.

== Species ==
These six species belong to the genus Helochara:

- Helochara communis Fitch, 1851^{c g b} (bog leafhopper)
- Helochara delta Oman, 1943^{c g}
- Helochara deltoides Hamilton, 1986^{c g b}
- Helochara forceps Hamilton, 1986^{c g}
- Helochara inflatoseta (Lethierry, 1890)^{c g}
- Helochara mexicana Hamilton, 1986^{c g}

Data sources: i = ITIS, c = Catalogue of Life, g = GBIF, b = Bugguide.net
