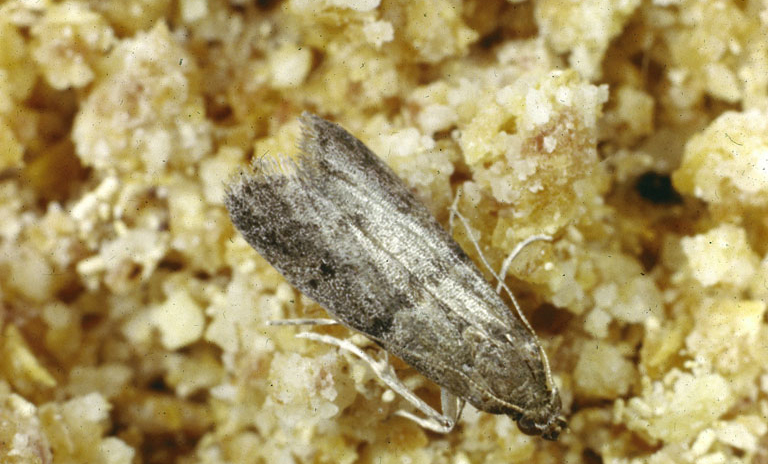
- Cacao moth (E. elutella)

Scientific classification
- Kingdom: Animalia
- Phylum: Arthropoda
- Clade: Pancrustacea
- Class: Insecta
- Order: Lepidoptera
- Family: Pyralidae
- Tribe: Phycitini
- Genus: Ephestia; Guenée, 1845

Species
- Several, see text

Synonyms
- Anagasta Heinrich, 1956; Hyphantidium Scott, 1859

= Ephestia =

Genus of moths

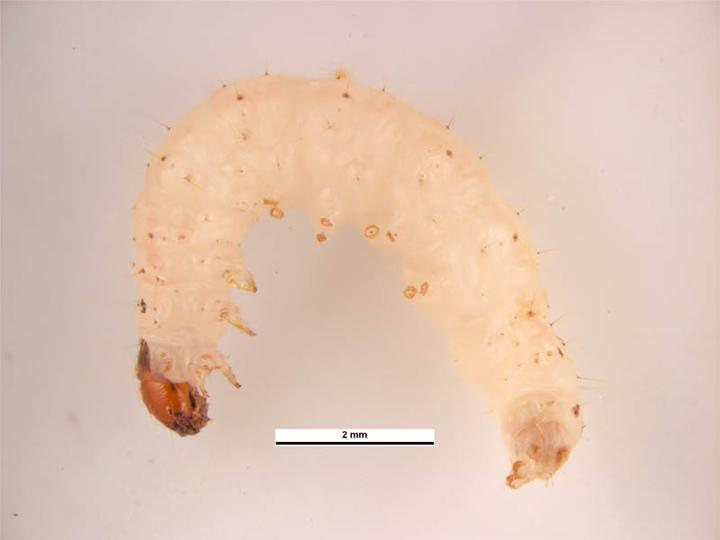
Ephestia kuehniella, larva

Ephestia is a genus of small moths belonging to the family Pyralidae. Some species are significant pests of dry plant produce, such as seeds and cereals. Best known among these are probably the cacao moth (E. elutella) and the Mediterranean flour moth (E. kuehniella).

The genus Cadra is closely related to Ephestia and might be a junior synonym. Several of these moths are variously assigned to one or the other genus, in particular in non-entomological sources.

== Diversity ==
Species of Ephestia include:

- Ephestia abnormalella Ragonot, 1887
- Ephestia animella K.Nupponen & Junnilainen, 1998
- Ephestia callidella Guenée, 1845
- Ephestia calycoptila Meyrick, 1935
- Ephestia columbiella Neunzig, 1990
- Ephestia cypriusella Roesler, 1965
- Ephestia disparella Hampson, 1901
- Ephestia elutella (Hübner, 1796) – cacao moth, tobacco moth, warehouse moth
- Ephestia inquietella Zerny, 1932
- Ephestia kuehniella (Zeller, 1879) – Mediterranean flour moth, Indian flour moth, mill moth
- Ephestia laetella Rebel, 1907
- Ephestia mistralella (Millière, 1874)
- Ephestia parasitella Staudinger, 1859
- Ephestia rectivittella Ragonot, 1901
- Ephestia subelutellum (Ragonot, 1901)
- Ephestia unicolorella Staudinger, 1881
- Ephestia welseriella (Zeller, 1848)
