= Pierre Millière =

French entomologist

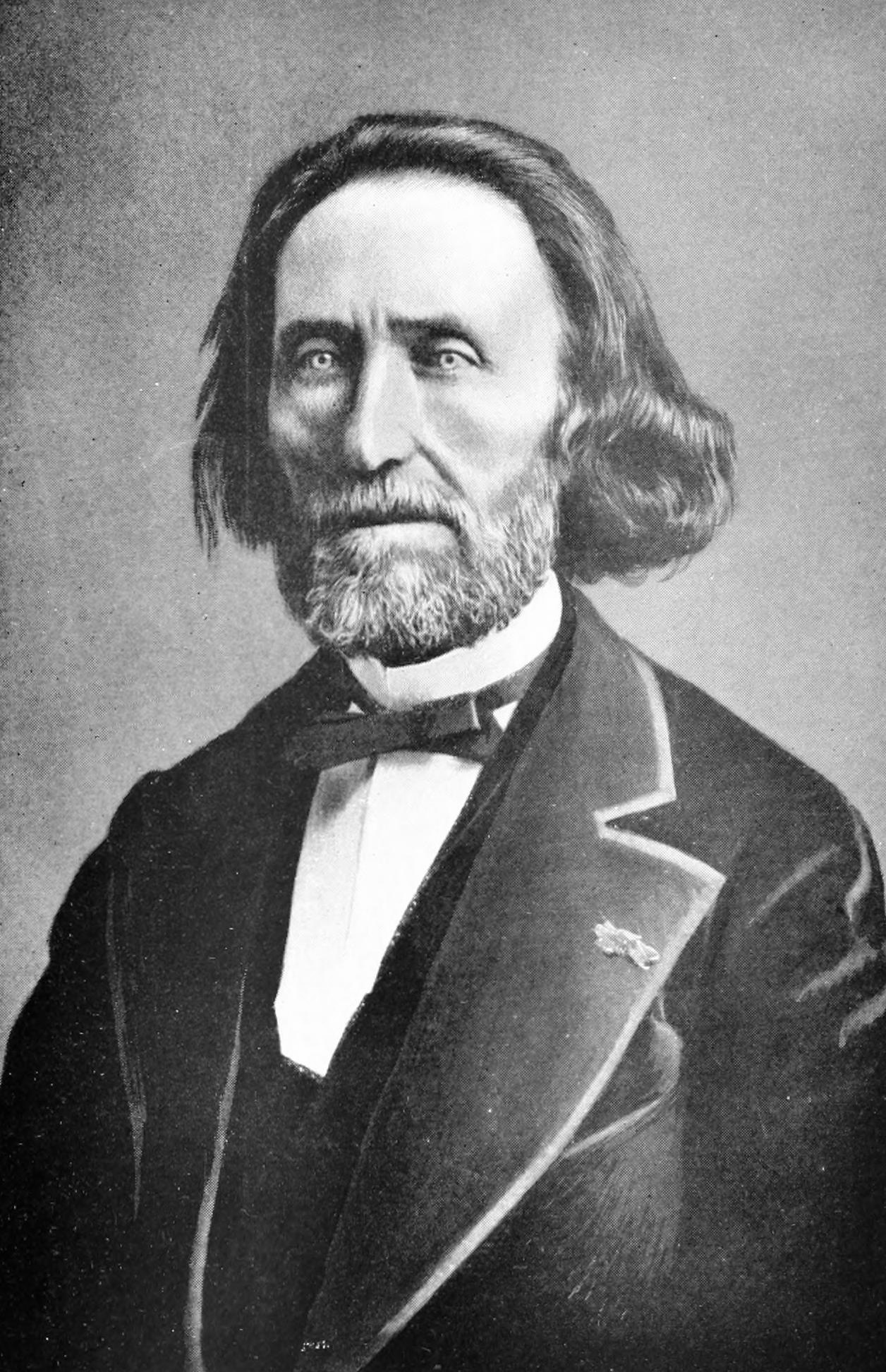
Pierre Millière

Pierre Millière was a French entomologist chiefly interested in Lepidoptera.

Born 1 December 1811 in Saint-Jean-de-Losne on the Côte d'Or and died 29 May 1887 in Cannes Millière was a pharmacist and dealer who studied Lepidoptera as a hobby, though in a very professional manner.

He was the author of Iconographie et description de Chenilles et Lépidoptères inédits. Paris, F. Savy, 1859-1874. 35 parts (bound in 3 volumes).

His collections of macrolepidoptera and Pyralidae are in Palais Coburg in Vienna, there are some of his microlepidoptera in the Natural History Museum, Leiden but the bulk of his microlepidoptera collection is in the Muséum national d'Histoire naturelle in Paris.
