= Mycetome =

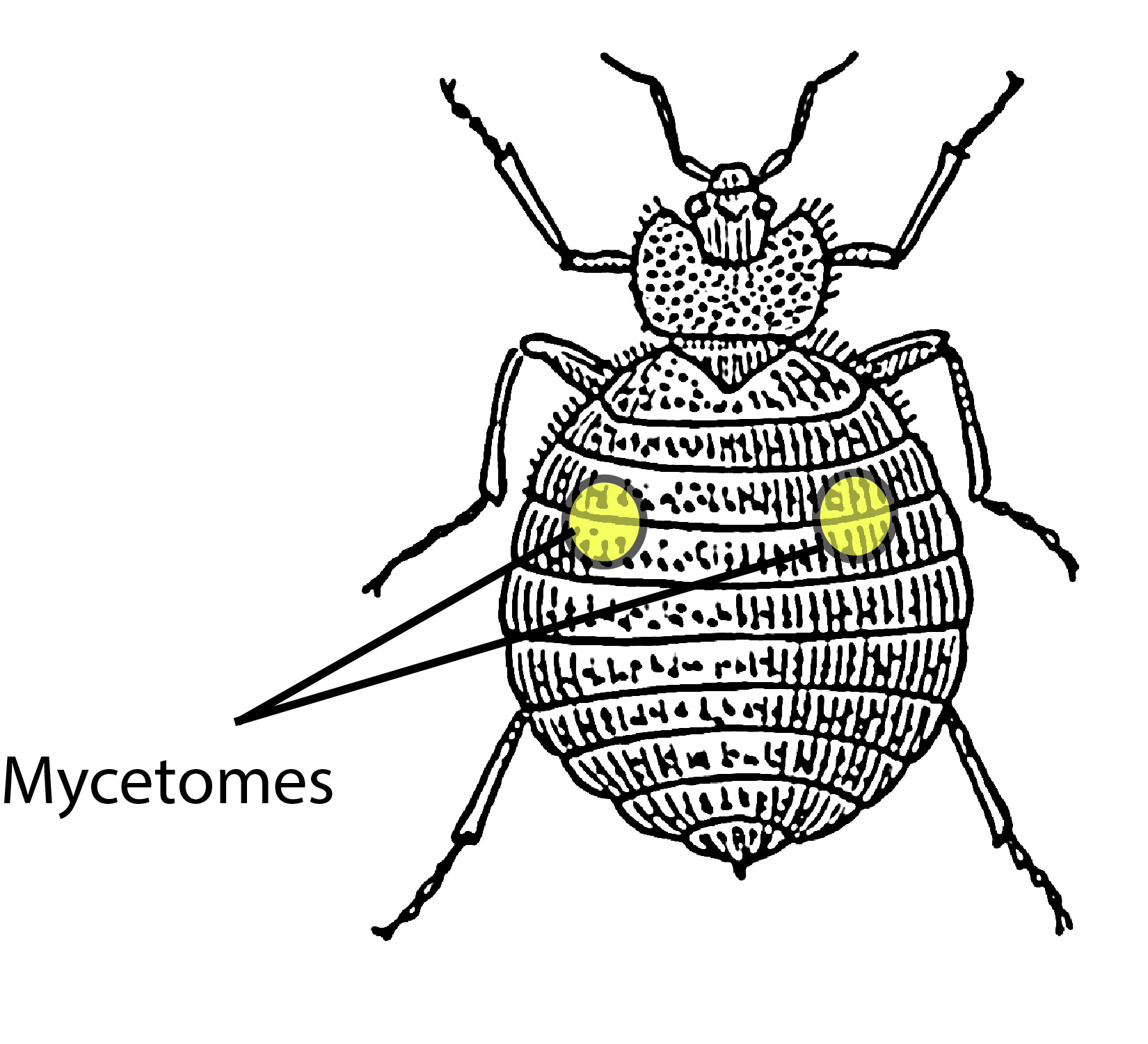
Location of the two mycetomes in the body of an adult Cimex lectularius

A mycetome is a specialized organ in a number of animal species which houses that animal's symbionts, isolating them from the animal's natural cellular defense mechanisms and allowing sustained controlled symbiotic growth. In several species, such as bed bugs and certain families of leech, these symbionts are attached to the gut and aid in the production of vitamin B from ingested meals of blood. In insects, the organisms that inhabit these structures are either bacteria or yeasts.

In bed bugs, it has been found that heat stress can damage the mycetome, preventing the symbionts from being successfully passed from the adult female to her eggs at the time of oogenesis, causing the resulting nymphs to develop abnormally or die prematurely.
