= Lasiodermini =

Scientific classification
- Kingdom: Animalia
- Phylum: Arthropoda
- Class: Insecta
- Order: Coleoptera
- Suborder: Polyphaga
- Family: Ptinidae
- Subfamily: Xyletininae
- Tribe: Lasiodermini

Tribe of beetles

Lasiodermini is a tribe of death-watch and spider beetles in the family Ptinidae. There are at least 3 genera and 30 described species in Lasiodermini.

== Genera ==
These three genera belong to the tribe Lasiodermini:

- Lasioderma Stephens, 1835
- Megorama Fall, 1905
- Pseudolasioderma Logvinovskiy, 1978
