= Arsenophonus nasoniae =

Scientific classification
- Domain: Bacteria
- Kingdom: Pseudomonadati
- Phylum: Pseudomonadota
- Class: Gammaproteobacteria
- Order: Enterobacterales
- Family: Morganellaceae
- Genus: Arsenophonus
- Species: A. nasoniae

Binomial name
- Arsenophonus nasoniae Gherna et al. 1991

Species of bacterium

Arsenophonus nasoniae is a species of bacterium which was previously isolated from Nasonia vitripennis, a species of parasitoid wasp. These wasps are generalists which afflict the larvae of parasitic carrion flies such as blowflies, houseflies and flesh flies. A. nasoniae belongs to the phylum Pseudomonadota and family Morganellaceae. The genus Arsenophonus, has a close relationship to the Proteus (bacterium) rather than to that of Salmonella and Escherichia. The genus is composed of gammaproteobacterial, secondary-endosymbionts which are gram-negative. Cells are non-flagellated, non-motile, non-spore forming and form long to highly filamentous rods. Cellular division is exhibited through septation. The name 'Arsenophonus nasoniae gen. nov., sp. nov.' was therefore proposed for the discovered bacterium due to its characteristics and its microbial interaction with N. vitripennis. The type strain of A. nasoniae is Strain SKI4 (ATCC 49151).

== Isolation and genomic profiling ==
The genome of A. nasoniae was carried out by DNA pyrosequencing and genome assembly. The assembled draft genome was composed of 3, 567, 128 base pairs and contained a mixture of both extrachromosomal DNA and bacterial chromosomes. Phylogenetic analyses revealed that the closest sequenced relatives of A. nasoniae are that of P. mirabilis and P. luminescens. Analyses also revealed that 67% of A. nasoniae open reading frames had homologous genes in the genera Proteus, Yersinia or Photorhabdus. Analysis of the extra-chromosomal genome showed that there was a group of putative plasmids encoding several groups of Type IV pili genes; these of which showed high homology with that of gammaproteobacteria conjugative transfer genes. Further phylogenetic analysis using a basic matrix revealed that the genus Arsenophonus forms a monophyletic clade.

In terms of bacterial metabolism, A. nasoniae is only present in a fraction of wasp hosts therefore the bacterium is unlikely to significantly contribute to the nutrition of the host insect. A. nasoniae was able to grow on cell-free media but required additional nutritional supplementation. This finding suggested that the bacterium is likely to have retained a variety of key metabolic pathways common to free-living bacteria; however the bacterium is also likely to have lost genes in pathways where the host environment (Nasonia vitripennis) provides the required metabolites.

A. nasoniae lacked genes for the metabolism of proline, histidine and arginine. The loss of loss of the histidine pathway is typical of a variety of obligate parasitic bacteria. Genomic analysis showed that A. nasoniae had conserved genes for ATP-binding cassette transporters for arginine, methionine and proline; therefore suggesting the bacterium is able to supplement its reduced bio-synthetic abilities by up-taking these amino acids from its environment. As for other biological pathways, A. nasoniae shares similarities with genomes of the insect-infecting bacterial genus, Wolbachia, by which genomic analysis revealed a bias towards the conservation of genes encoding enzymes and proteins involved in nucleotide, co-factor, vitamin and lipid metabolism.

== Killer-son trait in wasps ==
Microorganisms often have influence on insect species, in which some insects require presence of resident symbiotic bacteria for normal physiological function. In other cases, infecting bacteria may confer insect resistance against natural enemies, thus helping insect survival rates. In contrast to the positive roles some symbiotic bacteria play with regards to insects, there are a variety of microbiological interactions which hinder the host. In this case, the infecting microbe is transmitted vertically from parent to offspring, but leads to a reduction in host fitness. This action occurs by the alteration of the hosts' reproductive biology, such as causing imbalanced sex-ratios in offspring.

A. nasoniae is a maternally inherited parasitic bacterium which infects the parasitoid wasp species Nasonia vitripennis. Genetically, female wasp offspring are diploid and develop from fertilised eggs. Males on the other hand are haploid and develop from unfertilised eggs. A. nasoniae exhibits the son-killer trait which causes lethality of approximately 80% of male embryos produced by infected female wasps. A. nasoniae causes inhibition of the formation of the maternal centrosome in male N. vitripennis embryos. The maternal centrosome is an organelle which is specifically required for early male embryonic development. The action of the killer-son trait by A. nasoniae results in unorganized mitotic spindles and developmental arrest prior to the establishment of somatic sexual identity of the host wasps' offspring. The overall effect on wasp offspring is the induced killing of male haploid embryos; resulting in a skewed sex-ratio toward female offspring.

Transmission of the bacterium occurs through intermediate infection of the fly pupal host. This is due to injection into the host during stinging by the wasp, resulting in subsequent acquisition of the A. nasoniae infection during larval wasp feeding. This mode of transmission also results in the bacterial infection moving horizontally between individual wasps in N. vitripennis populations following co-infection within host pupa. A. nasoniae is then maintained in host wasp populations due to on-going horizontal transmission. A. nasoniae can be easily cultured outside of its host organism which is unusual for insect symbionts. The ability of the bacterium to live outside host cells may be an adaptive advantage for the exploitation of multiple different host organisms and species

95% of the daughters of an infected female inherit the killer-son trait. Because male hosts act as an evolutionary dead-end for A. nasoniae, the symbiont will increase its fitness if it causes the infected wasp host to produce more, or higher quality daughters, compared to that of an uninfected host. The killing of males therefore provides an incremental gain in fitness of infected females, which is relative to females infected with non-male-killing bacteria. Adaptive advantages for female off-spring by killing male off-spring include reduced competition by siblings for resources, reduced inbreeding and an increased consumption of local resources via consumption of dead male siblings. Aside from the son-killer trait, infection by the bacterium has not been found to measurably affect the host.

== Host diversity ==
Several studies have found that the diversity of Arsenophonus host species is particularly large and that the genus Arsenophonus represents one of the richest and most widespread clusters of symbiotic bacteria which infect insects. The diversity in the host range of A. nasoniae and other species can be explained by the bacterial transmission routes; by which the bacterium can be transmitted both vertically and through horizontal gene transfer among host species.

Infection by A. nasoniae has been detected in a variety of other wasp species, including two other members of the genus Nasoniae, Nasonia longicornis and Nasonia giraulti. Infection has also been detected in the wasp species Spalangia cameroni of the genus Spalangia and in the species Muscidifurax uniraptor of the genus Muscidifurax. Male-killing has been observed in all four species, reflecting the ability of A. nasoniae to infect a variety of different host organisms and be passed on vertically and horizontally. A. nasoniae has also been detected in a variety of fly species including Muscidifurax raptor and Pachycrepoideus vindemmiae. Microscopic studies have revealed morphologically similar symbionts to A. nasoniae from various tissues of blood-sucking triatomine insects. Several members of the genus Arsenophonus have also been found to infect hard tick species, aphids, antlions, bees, lice and two plant species.

A potential benefit of host infection by A. nasoniae is for the reduction of population sizes in parasites which negatively impact potentially endangered or ecologically important species. For example, a study was carried out by which the parasitoid wasp Pteromalus venustus was infected horizontally with A. nasoniae. This wasp infects populations of the alfalfa leaf-cutting bee, Megachile rotundata. Infection was observed to induce the killer-son trait in P. venustus, therefore lowering the proportion of male wasp off-spring and negatively impacting mating success for female off-spring. Overall, action of A. nasoniae could help to reduce the P. venustus population in the bees, with potential for application concerning the conservation of important or endangered species.
