= Erich Bornberg-Bauer =

Austrian Bioinformatician

- Born: 1963 (age 62–63); Vienna, Austria
- Education: University of Vienna
- Known for: Protein evolution; Neutral networks; De novo gene birth
- Awards: Member Faculty of 1000
- Scientific career
- Fields: Biochemistry; Molecular Evolution; Bioinformatics; Origin of Life.
- Workplaces: Westphalian Wilhelms-University; Max Planck Institute for Biology
- Doctoral advisor: Prof. Peter Schuster
- Website: bornberglab.org

Erich Bornberg-Bauer (born 1963 in Vienna) is an Austrian biochemist, theoretical biologist and bioinformatician.

== Life ==
Bornberg-Bauer studied biochemistry, physics and mathematics (1981–1991) at the University of Vienna and obtained a diploma in biochemistry (1992). He performed his doctoral research on evolutionary fitness landscapes of RNA and proteins in the group of Peter Schuster, Institute of Theoretical Chemistry, University of Vienna, and received his Ph.D in 1995. He continued his academic career at the University of Vienna (Institute of Mathematics) as a university assistant (equivalent to assistant professor; 1994 – 1996). Thereafter, he worked at the Deutsche Krebsforschungszentrum in Heidelberg as a postdoctoral researcher in the group of Martin Vingron on algorithms for sequence analysis (1996–1998), and subsequently as a project leader at EML (European Media Laboratory) GmbH (1998 – 2000; this department is now a part of Heidelberg Institute for Theoretical Studies). Since 2000, Bornberg-Bauer has been working as an independent academic researcher, first as a senior lecturer in bioinformatics at the University of Manchester (2000–2003), and then as a professor of Molecular Evolution and Bioinformatics at the Institute for Evolution and Biodiversity, University of Münster (2003 – present). Since 2018, he is a guest scientist at the Max Planck Institute for Biology in Tübingen. He has been a guest professor at Claude Bernard University Lyon 1 and a visiting scholar at European Bioinformatics Institute.

== Research ==
Bornberg-Bauer's earlier research focused on the aspects of RNA and protein evolution, especially on the phenomenon of neutral evolution, evolvability and robustness. Together with Hue Sun Chan (University of Toronto), he developed the concept of superfunnels on neutral networks, which describes how populations of functional polymers (such as proteins) randomly explore the sequence space to find transition sequences (switches) to new networks. His work also showed that errors in a protein's sequence that arise during translation (phenotypic mutations), help to explore the sequence space more rapidly. This phenomenon, termed as the look ahead effect, dramatically increases the probability of a gene to acquire beneficial double mutations. His research group at the University of Münster has been working on three main research topics. First is (since 2005) modular evolution of proteins, which involves understanding of how protein domains can reshuffle to create new proteins with altered functions. The second topic is about a phenomenon known as de novo gene birth by which new protein coding genes emerge from DNA segments in an organism's genome, that do not contain any genes. The third topic is genomic analysis of the evolution of eusociality in insects. Bornberg-Bauer has been involved in the initial genome sequencing and annotation of Eucalyptus grandis, Nasonia vitripennis, Nasonia giraulti, Nasonia longicornis, Zostera marina, Bombus terrestris, Bombus impatiens, Atta cephalotes, Blattella germanica and Cryptotermes secundus

His earlier work and most research projects from his group, primarily involve bioinformatics and computational biology. Recent projects form his group have coupled theoretical findings with experiments to understand the molecular evolution of promiscuous (multifunctional) enzymes, and the properties of proteins that emerge de novo. Bornberg-Bauer's work has been supported by the German Research Foundation, the Volkswagen Foundation, the European Commission, and four research grants from the Human Frontier Science Program in 2006, 2013, 2018 and 2023, among others. Since 2021, Bornberg-Bauer is leading the research priority program, "The Genomic Basis of Evolutionary Innovations (GEvol)" of the German Research Foundation He has been Editor-in-chief of Bioinformatics and Biology Insights since 2009 and is editorial member of the Journal of the Royal Society Interface, BMC Evolutionary Biology and the Journal of Experimental Zoology.

== Publications ==
Erich Bornberg-Bauer has published more than 150 scientific articles and book chapters.

Scientific articles

- Erich Bornberg-Bauer Publication list (University of Münster: Bornberglab)

Selected publications

- Bornberg-Bauer, Erich; Eicholt, Lars A. (2026-01-28). "Emergence and evolution of protein-coding de novo genes". Nature Reviews Genetics. doi:10.1038/s41576-025-00929-9. ISSN 1471-0056.
- Lange, A.; Patel, P.H.; Heames, B.; et al. (2021). "Structural and functional characterization of a putative de novo gene in Drosophila". Nature Communications. 12 (1) 1667. Bibcode:2021NatCo..12.1667L. doi:10.1038/s41467-021-21667-6. PMC 7954818. PMID 33712569.
- Terrapon, N; Li, C; Robertson, HM; Ji, L; Meng, X; Booth, W; Chen, Z; Childers, CP; Glastad, KM; Gokhale, K; Gowin, J; Gronenberg, W; Hermansen, RA; Hu, H; Hunt, BG; Huylmans, AK; Khalil, SM; Mitchell, RD; Munoz-Torres, MC; Mustard, JA; Pan, H; Reese, JT; Scharf, ME; Sun, F; Vogel, H; Xiao, J; Yang, W; Yang, Z; Yang, Z; Zhou, J; Zhu, J; Brent, CS; Elsik, CG; Goodisman, MA; Liberles, DA; Roe, RM; Vargo, EL; Vilcinskas, A; Wang, J; Bornberg-Bauer, E; Korb, J; Zhang, G; Liebig, J (2014). "Molecular traces of alternative social organization in a termite genome". Nat Commun. 5 3636. Bibcode:2014NatCo...5.3636T. doi:10.1038/ncomms4636. hdl:2286/R.I.44873. PMID 24845553..
- Harrison, MC; Jongepier, E; Robertson, HM; Arning, N; Bitard-Feildel, T; Chao, H; Childers, CP; Dinh, H; Doddapaneni, H; Dugan, S; Gowin, J; Greiner, C; Han, Y; Hu, H; Hughes, DST; Huylmans, AK; Kemena, C; Kremer, LPM; Lee, SL; Lopez-Ezquerra, A; Mallet, L; Monroy-Kuhn, JM; Moser, A; Murali, SC; Muzny, DM; Otani, S; Piulachs, MD; Poelchau, M; Qu, J; Schaub, F; Wada-Katsumata, A; Worley, KC; Xie, Q; Ylla, G; Poulsen, M; Gibbs, RA; Schal, C; Richards, S; Belles, X; Korb, J; Bornberg-Bauer, E (2018). "Hemimetabolous genomes reveal molecular basis of termite eusociality". Nat Ecol Evol. 2 (3): 557–566. Bibcode:2018NatEE...2..557H. doi:10.1038/s41559-017-0459-1. PMC 6482461. PMID 29403074..
- Sikosek, T; Chan, HS; Bornberg-Bauer, E (2012). "Escape from Adaptive Conflict follows from weak functional trade-offs and mutational robustness". Proc Natl Acad Sci U S A. 109 (37): 14888–93. Bibcode:2012PNAS..10914888S. doi:10.1073/pnas.1115620109. PMC 3443171. PMID 22927372., Sikosek, T; Chan, HS; Bornberg-Bauer, E (2012). "Escape from Adaptive Conflict follows from weak functional trade-offs and mutational robustness". Proc Natl Acad Sci U S A. 109 (37): 14888–93. Bibcode:2012PNAS..10914888S. doi:10.1073/pnas.1115620109. PMC 3443171. PMID 22927372..
- Bornberg-Bauer, E; Chan, HS (1999). "Modeling evolutionary landscapes: mutational stability, topology, and superfunnels in sequence space". Proc Natl Acad Sci U S A. 96 (19): 10689–94. Bibcode:1999PNAS...9610689B. doi:10.1073/pnas.96.19.10689. PMC 17944. PMID 10485887., Bornberg-Bauer, E; Chan, HS (1999). "Modeling evolutionary landscapes: mutational stability, topology, and superfunnels in sequence space". Proc Natl Acad Sci U S A. 96 (19): 10689–94. Bibcode:1999PNAS...9610689B. doi:10.1073/pnas.96.19.10689. PMC 17944. PMID 10485887..
- Moore, AD; Bornberg-Bauer, E (2012). "The dynamics and evolutionary potential of domain loss and emergence". Mol Biol Evol. 29 (2): 787–96. doi:10.1093/molbev/msr250. PMC 3258042. PMID 22016574., Moore, AD; Bornberg-Bauer, E (2012). "The dynamics and evolutionary potential of domain loss and emergence". Mol Biol Evol. 29 (2): 787–96. doi:10.1093/molbev/msr250. PMC 3258042. PMID 22016574..
- Weiner, J 3rd; Beaussart, F; Bornberg-Bauer, E (2006). "Domain deletions and substitutions in the modular protein evolution". FEBS J. 273 (9): 2037–47. doi:10.1111/j.1742-4658.2006.05220.x. PMID 16640566..
- Whitehead, DJ; Wilke, CO; Vernazobres, D; Bornberg-Bauer, E (2008). "The look-ahead effect of phenotypic mutations". Biol. Direct. 3: 18. doi:10.1186/1745-6150-3-18. PMC 2423361. PMID 18479505., Whitehead, DJ; Wilke, CO; Vernazobres, D; Bornberg-Bauer, E (2008). "The look-ahead effect of phenotypic mutations". Biol. Direct. 3: 18. doi:10.1186/1745-6150-3-18. PMC 2423361. PMID 18479505..
- Wissler, L; Gadau, J; Simola, DF; Helmkampf, M; Bornberg-Bauer, E (January 2013). "Mechanisms and dynamics of orphan gene emergence in insect genomes". Genome Biol Evol. 5 (2): 439–55. doi:10.1093/gbe/evt009. PMC 3590893. PMID 23348040..
- Olsen, J.; Rouzé, P.; Verhelst, B.; et al. (2016). "The genome of the seagrass Zostera marina reveals angiosperm adaptation to the sea". Nature. 530 (7590): 331–335. Bibcode:2016Natur.530..331O. doi:10.1038/nature16548. hdl:10400.1/9620. PMID 26814964.
- Sadd, B.M.; Barribeau, S.M.; Bloch, G.; et al. (2015). "The genomes of two key bumblebee species with primitive eusocial organization". Genome Biology. 16 (1) 76. doi:10.1186/s13059-015-0623-3. PMC 4414376. PMID 25908251.
- Myburg, A.; Grattapaglia, D.; Tuskan, G.; et al. (2014). "The genome of Eucalyptus grandis". Nature. 510 (7505): 356–362. Bibcode:2014Natur.510..356M. doi:10.1038/nature13308. hdl:2263/42125. PMID 24919147.
