= Eudonia linealis =

Conservation status
- Data Deficit (NZ TCS)

Scientific classification
- Kingdom: Animalia
- Phylum: Arthropoda
- Clade: Pancrustacea
- Class: Insecta
- Order: Lepidoptera
- Family: Crambidae
- Genus: Eudonia
- Species: E. linealis

Binomial name
- Eudonia linealis (Walker, 1866)

Synonyms
- Scoparia linealis Walker, 1866

Species of moth

Eudonia linealis is a species of moth in the family Crambidae. This species is endemic to New Zealand. In 2025 this species was classified as "data deficient" under the New Zealand Threat Classification System.

== Taxonomy ==
It was originally described by Francis Walker in 1866 using a specimen collected in Nelson by T. R. Oxley and named Scoparia linealis. Hudson discussed this species in his 1928 publication The Butterflies and Moths of New Zealand as a synonym of Scoparia submarginalis. In 1988 John S. Dugdale placed the species in the genus Eudonia. There is debate as to whether this species is recognised, as the type specimen is lacking its abdomen. It has been hypothesized that the holotype of this species, held at the Natural History Museum, London, may be a worn specimen of Eudonia philerga. This species was regarded as taxonomically unresolved in the 2025 threat classification.

== Description ==
Walker described the species as follows:

Female. Blackish. Body beneath and legs silvery white. Palpi porrect, fringed, a little longer than the breadth of the head; third joint lanceolate, less than half the length of the second. Antennae very slender. Legs smooth. Fore wings slightly acute, thickly hoary-speckled, except an interrupted black longitudinal line in the disk and a few slender longitudinal interrupted black streaks near the exterior border; two hoary slightly zigzag lines; one at rather beyond one-fourth of the length, black-bordered on the outer side; the other at much beyond three-fourths of the length, black-bordered on the inner side; marginal points black. Hind wings aeneous-cinereous. Length of the body 4 lines; of the wines 9 lines.

== Distribution ==
This species is endemic to New Zealand. The type specimen was collected in Nelson. This species has possibly been rediscovered at Canaan Downs on Takaka Hill by Ian Millar.

== Conservation status ==
In 2025 this species was classified by the New Zealand Department of Conservation as "data deficient" under the New Zealand Threat Classification System.
