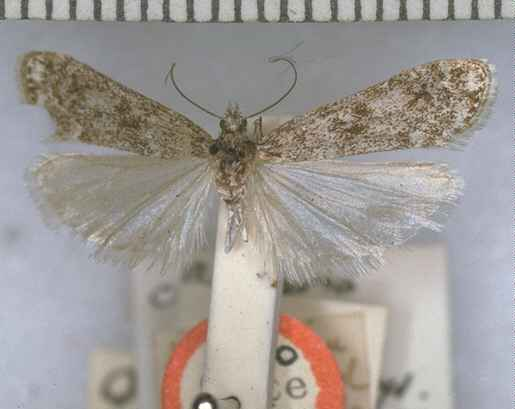
- Male holotype

Scientific classification
- Kingdom: Animalia
- Phylum: Arthropoda
- Class: Insecta
- Order: Lepidoptera
- Family: Crambidae
- Genus: Eudonia
- Species: E. oreas

Binomial name
- Eudonia oreas (Meyrick, 1884)

Synonyms
- Scoparia oreas Meyrick, 1884

= Eudonia oreas =

Species of moth endemic to New Zealand

Eudonia oreas is a moth in the family Crambidae. This species was named by Edward Meyrick in 1884. It is endemic to New Zealand and is only found in the Otago region of the South Island. It inhabits the high alpine zone throughout Otago and can also be found in low lying areas around Dunedin. The adults and larvae have been found on rock faces. Adults are recorded as being on the wing in December.

== Taxonomy ==
This species was named by Edward Meyrick in 1884 using a specimen collected at Ben Lomond near Lake Wakatipu at an altitude of 5,000 ft (1,500 m) and originally named Scoparia oreas. Meyrick went on to give a full description of the species in 1885. George Hudson discussed this species in his 1928 publication The butterflies and moths of New Zealand. In 1988 John S. Dugdale placed this species in the genus Eudonia. The holotype specimen is held at the Natural History Museum, London.

== Description ==
Meyrick described this species as follows:

Male.—22 mm. Head and thorax whitish, strongly mixed with dark fuscous. Palpi 3 1/4, dark fuscous, apex and basal joint white. Antennae pubescent, dark grey, ciliations 1. Abdomen whitish-grey, segmental margins whitish. Legs white, tibiae and tarsi banded with blackish. Forewings very elongate, tolerably triangular, costa slightly arched, apex rounded, hindmargin obliquely rounded; white, somewhat mixed with pale grey, and rather thinly irrorated with dark fuscous; some obscure dark fuscous spots near base; first line white, very indistinct, somewhat curved, tolerably indented, posteriorly obscurely margined with dark fuscous; orbicular moderate, roundish, dark fuscous, detached; claviform moderate, broadly linear, dark fuscous, touching first line; reniform 8-shaped, whitish, margined with dark fuscous, upper and lower margins incomplete; second line white, indistinct, dilated to form spots on costa and inner margin, obscurely margined with dark fuscous; subterminal broad, white, ill-defined, narrowly interrupted above middle, apex of lower portion almost coalescing with second line; hindmargin dark fuscous, with a row of white dots : cilia. white, with a sharply-defined dark fuscous line. Hindwings 1 1/3, grey-whitish, apex hardly darker; cilia whitish.

This species is similar in appearance to Eudonia philerga but can be distinguished as E. oreas has longer and narrower forewings, whiteish hindwings, as well as the longer ciliations on the antennae.

== Distribution ==
This species is endemic to New Zealand. It is only found in Otago in the South Island.

== Habitat ==
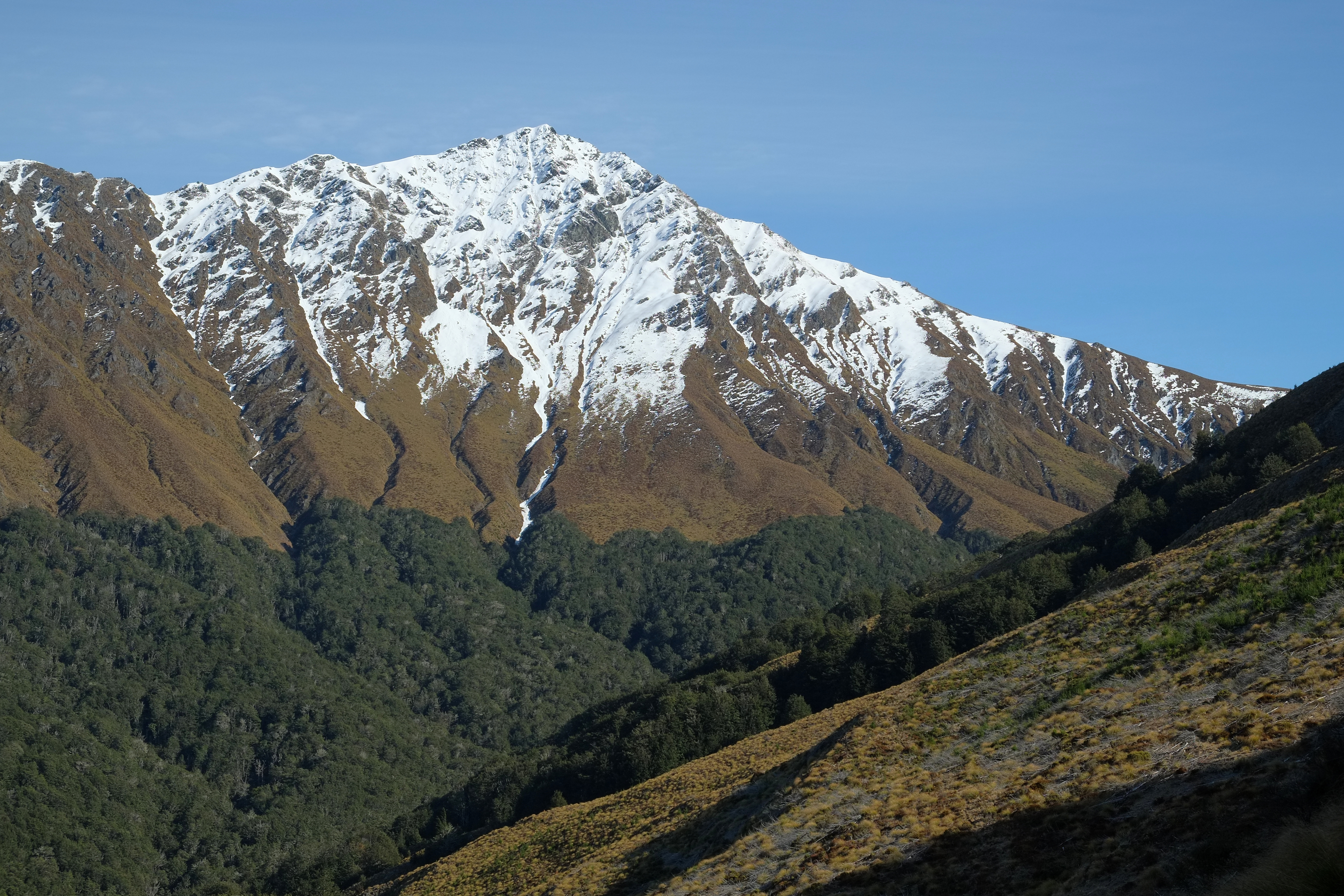
Type locality, Ben Lomond.

This moth is lives in the high alpine zone throughout Otago and also in low lying areas around Dunedin. Both the adults and larvae of this species inhabit rock faces.

== Behaviour ==
Adults have been recorded on wing in December.
