= Cardinium =

"Candidatus Cardinium"

Scientific classification (Candidatus)
- Domain: Bacteria
- Phylum: Bacteroidota
- Class: Sphingobacteriia
- Order: Sphingobacteriales
- Family: incertae sedis
- Genus: "Candidatus Cardinium" Zchori-Fein et al. 2004
- Species: "Ca. C. hertigii"

Binomial name
- "Candidatus Cardinium hertigii" Zchori-Fein et al. 2004

Genus of bacteria

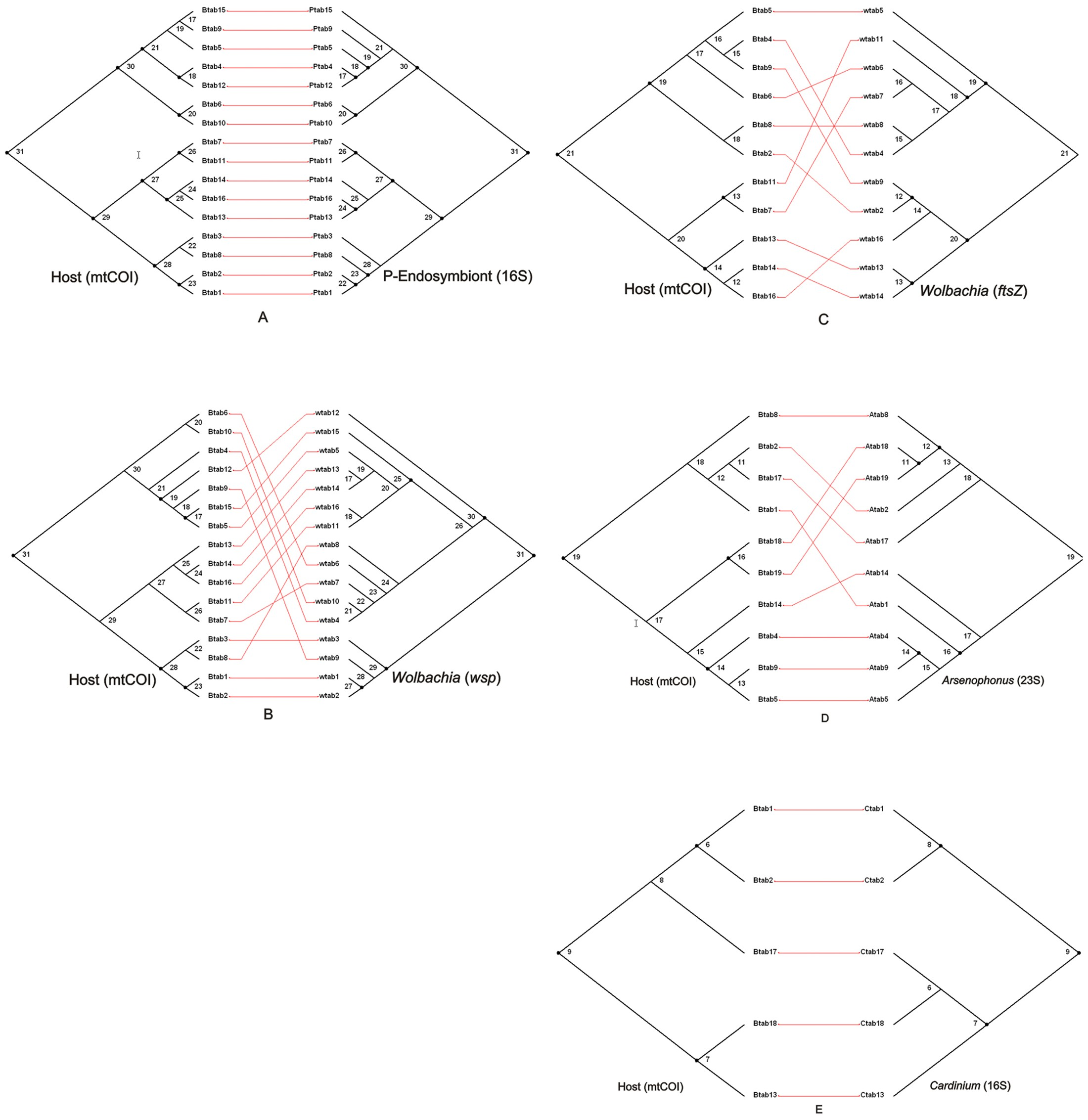
This image is a set of phylogenetic trees based on various sequencing data. It includes two Wolbachia genes and Cardinium 16S rRNA sequence data, along with a reference P-endosymbiont and Arsenophonus.

"Candidatus Cardinium" is a genus of Gram-negative parasitic bacteria that reside within cells of some arthropods and nematodes. Although they have not yet been isolated in pure culture (hence the designation Candidatus), they are known to influence reproduction in their hosts in order to further their own proliferation via maternal transmission. This leads to their classification as a reproductive parasite. Another example of this type of parasitism is the genus Wolbachia, which also infects arthropods. These two genera can also co-infect the same animal, as in some nematodes. "Candidatus Cardinium" bacteria use many of the same methods to interfere with host reproduction as Wolbachia, including inducing cytoplasmic incompatibility and distorting the sex ratio in the host population to favor females. The mechanisms by which "Candidatus Cardinium" induces these conditions in hosts are thought to be different from the mechanisms used by Wolbachia. "Candidatus Cardinium" bacteria are maternally inherited; infections are maintained through generations through the egg cells (termed vertical transmission). It is estimated that 6–10% of all arthropods are infected with "Candidatus Cardinium" bacteria.

"Candidatus Cardinium" were first discovered in 1996 in the cells of deer ticks, although attempts to culture them independently of host cells were unsuccessful.
