= Spalangia endius =

Scientific classification
- Kingdom: Animalia
- Phylum: Arthropoda
- Class: Insecta
- Order: Hymenoptera
- Family: Spalangiidae
- Genus: Spalangia
- Species: S. endius

Binomial name
- Spalangia endius Walker, 1839

Species of wasp

Spalangia endius is an insect of the family Spalangiidae. The scientific name was published in 1839.
