= Cytoplasmic incompatibility =

Mating incompatibility in arthropods caused by parasites

Cytoplasmic incompatibility (CI) is a mating incompatibility reported in many arthropod species that is caused by intracellular parasites such as Wolbachia. These bacteria reside in the cytoplasm of the host cells (hence the name cytoplasmic incompatibility) and modify their hosts' sperm in a way that leads to embryo death unless this modification is 'rescued' by the same bacteria in the eggs. CI has been reported in many insect species (including amongst many others mosquitoes, Drosophila fruit flies, flour beetles, snout moths and parasitoid wasps), as well as in mites and woodlice. Aside from Wolbachia, CI can be induced by the bacteria Cardinium, Rickettsiella, Candidatus Mesenet longicola and Spiroplasma. CI is currently being exploited as a mechanism for Wolbachia-mediated disease control in mosquitoes.

== History ==
CI was first reported in mosquitoes in the 1930s and then studied extensively in the 1950s by Sabbas Ghelelovitch and especially Hannes Laven. Laven apparently was also the first to recognise the potential for CI-induced speciation and population control. The first mathematical model uncovering the population biological principles of CI was presented in 1959. In 1971, Janice Yen and A. Ralph Barr demonstrated the etiologic relationship between Wolbachia infection and cytoplasmic incompatibility in Culex mosquitos when they found that eggs were killed when the sperm of Wolbachia-infected males fertilized infection-free eggs. The discovery that Wolbachia is very common and widely distributed across arthropods lead to a surge in research on CI in the 1990s and 2000s. Several landmark studies in the 2010s paved the way to use CI-inducing Wolbachia for controlling suppressing diseases such as dengue fever in mosquitoes.

== Symptoms ==
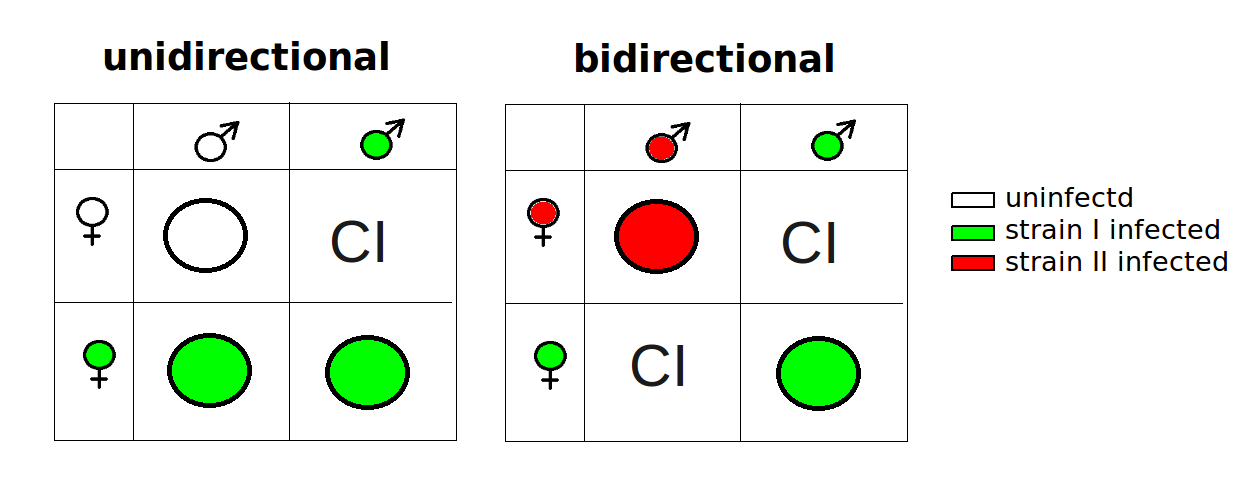
Unidirectional CI: Mating of infected males and uninfected females results in CI. All other crosses are compatible. Bidirectional CI: Mating of males infected with Wolbachia strain I and females infected by Wolbachia strain II (and vice versa) results in CI.

CI occurs when a Wolbachia infected male mates with a female that is infected by another Wolbachia strain (bidirectional CI) or is uninfected (unidirectional CI). Any other combination of un-/infected male/female crosses are compatible. An infected female is compatible with any uninfected male, or with any male infected with the same Wolbachia strain. On the other hand, an uninfected female is only compatible with an uninfected male. In other words, if the male is infected by a CI-inducing strain of Wolbachia that is non-existent in its mate, it is an incompatible cross. Turelli et al. 2018 finds that CI can be resolved by infection of the females with the same strain that is affecting the males, which imposes a population level incentive in favour of CI-inducing strains of Wolbachia. They also find that this propagates the WO phage. Hosts can be cured from Wolbachia infection by antibiotic use.

In diploid organisms CI leads to embryonic mortality. In contrast, CI in haplodiploid hosts can also manifest as embryonic mortality, but may also in some species lead to haploid offspring that then develop into males. The closely related species of the wasp Nasonia show embryonic mortality as well as male development among incompatible crosses. In N. vitripennis, however, the vast majority of the CI embryos are converted into males.

== Cellular mechanism ==
There are two distinguished events that lead to the CI inducing manipulation. The first occurs inside the Wolbachia infected male during spermatogenesis and is called modification. Because Wolbachia are absent from mature sperm and appear to be excluded during the individualization process, the modification must occur before the conclusion of spermatogenesis. The second event, called rescue, takes place inside the fertilized egg where Wolbachia presence prevents CI from occurring. As long as the Wolbachia strains in egg and sperm cells correspond, harmful effects cannot be observed on a cellular level.

A major consequence of CI is the delayed entry into mitosis of the male pronucleus. As a secondary consequence, stemming from this asynchrony, the paternal chromosomes do not properly condense and align on the metaphase plate during the first mitosis. As a consequence, only the maternal chromosome segregate normally, producing haploid embryos. The rescue of CI by infected eggs leads to the restoration of synchrony between the female and the male pronucleus.

The exact mechanisms of how Wolbachia perform modification and rescue are unknown. In Drosophila, the earliest effects caused by CI can already be observed during the sperm chromatin remodeling of the paternal chromosomes. However, it was also observed that in other host species, the defects caused by CI only occur much later in development.

== Population biology ==
CI is a manipulative phenotype that can lead to the rapid spread of the bacteria inducing it. CI results in the death of uninfected offspring and therefore the infected offspring benefit from reduced competition within the population. When the CI-inducing bacteria are rare in the population, there will be only few incompatible matings and selection (or drive) towards higher frequencies will only be weak. However, the more common the bacteria become, the stronger the selection and hence the faster their spread through the population (positive frequency-dependent selection). Unimpeded, the bacteria can therefore quickly reach infection frequencies of 100%.

However, a number of empirically well-documented factors can slow down or even prevent the spread of CI-inducing agents. These include imperfect maternal transmission, reduced fitness of infected individuals, or incomplete CI. When maternal transmission is incomplete and/or infected females have a reduced fitness, an 'infection threshold' arises so that the bacteria spread from an initial frequency above this threshold but become extinct when their initial frequency is below the threshold. The invasion threshold may be overcome through random genetic drift and therefore facilitated by small (at least locally) population sizes.

More complex scenarios than that of a simple host population have been explored through mathematical models, including models with more than one strain or species of maternally inherited bacteria, structured host populations, random genetic drift and overlapping generations.

== Evolutionary implications ==
CI, as described by Werren, results in selection pressure on uninfected males, as infected females can mate both with uninfected males and infected males, but uninfected females cannot mate with infected males. As Wolbachia are only transmitted by females, this mechanism promotes the spread of Wolbachia and therefore keeps Wolbachia from dying out because of incomplete transmission. This has led to discoveries in control of disease transmission by using Wolbachia to control the reproduction of a population by introducing Wolbachia-infected males. This has been seen in the Aedes, mosquito, family, in the Aedes albopictus and Aedes aegypti species.

=== Speciation ===
It is speculated that CI can lead to "rapid speciation". When two populations of the same species are infected by two Wolbachia strains A and B, they might be bidirectionally incompatible and crosses between the two populations do not lead to viable offspring. Thus gene flow between these two populations is interrupted, leading to constant segregation in development and, finally, to speciation. The populations develop to a point where incompatibility would be maintained even in absence of Wolbachia.

== See also ==
- Wolbachia
- Cardinium
- Endosymbiont
- Intragenomic conflict
