= OSER1 =

Protein-coding gene in the species Homo sapiens

Identifiers
- Aliases: OSER1, C20orf111, HSPC207, Osr1, Perit1, dJ1183I21.1, oxidative stress responsive serine rich 1
- External IDs: MGI: 1913930; GeneCards: OSER1

Gene location (Human)
Chr.	Chromosome 20 (human)
Band	20q13.12	Start	44,195,939 bp
Band	20q13.12	End	44,210,771 bp

Gene location (Mouse)
Chr.	Chromosome 2 (mouse)
Band	2|2 H3	Start	163,247,742 bp
Band	2|2 H3	End	163,266,617 bp
RNA expression pattern
Bgee	Human / Mouse (ortholog); Top expressed in: left testis; right testis; sperm; muscle of thigh; gastrocnemius muscle; buccal mucosa cell; gastric mucosa; popliteal artery; tibial arteries; skin of leg / Top expressed in: primary oocyte; secondary oocyte; zygote; testicle; esophagus; muscle of thigh; spermatid; islet of Langerhans; granulocyte; morula; More reference expression data
BioGPS	n/a
Orthologs
Databases	NCBI: entry; OMA: entry
Species	Human	Mouse
Entrez	51526	66680
Ensembl	ENSG00000132823	ENSMUSG00000035399
UniProt	Q9NX31	Q9D722
RefSeq (mRNA)	NM_016470	NM_025699
RefSeq (protein)	NP_057554	NP_079975
Location (UCSC)	Chr 20: 44.2 – 44.21 Mb	Chr 2: 163.25 – 163.27 Mb
PubMed search
- Wikidata
View/Edit Human	View/Edit Mouse

OSER1 (Oxidative Stress Responsive Serine Rich 1), or Chromosome 20 open reading frame 111, C20orf111, is the hypothetical protein that in humans is encoded by the OSER1 gene. OSER1/C20orf111 is also known as Perit1 (peroxide inducible transcript 1), HSPC207, and dJ1183I21.1. It was originally located using genomic sequencing of chromosome 20. The National Center for Biotechnology Information, or NCBI, shows that it is located at q13.11 on chromosome 20, however the genome browser at the University of California-Santa Cruz (UCSC) website shows that it is at location q13.12, and within a million base pairs of the adenosine deaminase locus. It was also found to have an increase in expression in cells undergoing hydrogen peroxide(H_{2}O_{2})-induced apoptosis. After analyzing the amino acid content of OSER1, it was found to be rich in serine residues.

== Gene ==
OSER1 a valid, protein coding gene that is found on the minus strand of chromosome 20 at q13.12 by searching the UCSC Genome Browser, but q13.11 according to Refseq on NCBI.

=== Gene neighborhood ===
A few of the known genes near OSER1 are given in the box below with their known function.

Gene	Chromosomal Location	Strand	Function
Junctophilin 2 (JPH2)	20q13.12	Minus	Help facilitate the assembly of DHPR with other proteins of the excitation-contraction coupling machinery. Loss of function leads to cardiac-specific JPH2 deficiency and results in lower cardiac contractility
TOX high mobility group box family member 2 (Tox2)	20q13.12	Plus	Shown to play a large role in transcription activation
Adenosine deaminase (ADA)	20q13.12	Minus	Encodes an enzyme that catalyzes the hydrolysis of adenosine to inosine. Deficiency in this enzyme causes a form of severe combined immunodeficiency disease (SCID), in which there is dysfunction of both B and T lymphocytes with impaired cellular immunity and decreased production of immunoglobulins.

== Transcript ==
=== General properties ===
- Genomic DNA Length:14,968 base pairs (bp)
- Most common mRNA Length: 2,260 bp with 4 exons. Has 10 splice isoforms.
- 5' untranslated region 252 bp long.
- 3' untranslated region 1,129 bp long.

=== Transcript variants ===
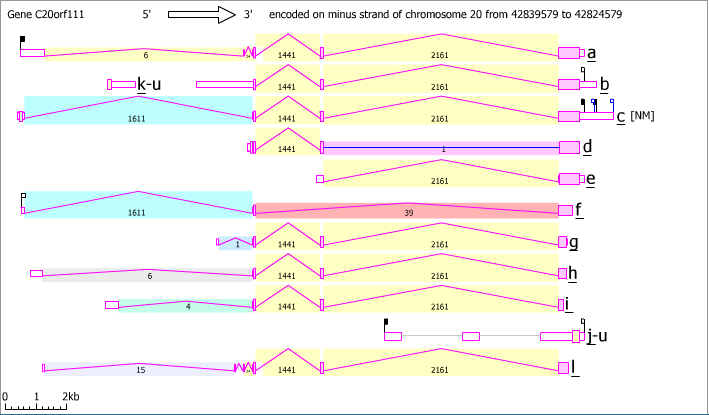
Transcript Variants of C20orf111

10 splice isoforms that encode good proteins, altogether 8 different isoforms, 2 of which are complete isoforms. The image below shows the 10 isoforms that are predicted. Of these 10 splice isoforms, 8 have varying peptide lengths, however all of these proteins are only hypothetical with no extensive research done on them.

=== Transcription regulation ===
When looking at the predicted promoter sequence, there are no RNA Polymerase II binding sites, however there is a binding site for core promoter element for TATA-less promoters. In this same region of the promoter, there is also a TATA-binding factor sequence, which helps in the positioning of RNA polymerase II for transcription.

== Protein ==
=== General properties ===
- Contains a highly conserved domain of unknown function 776 (DUF776), which composes 62% of the entire protein.
- Molecular weight 31.8 kilodaltons
- Isoelectric point 8.57
- Predicted to be a nuclear protein

=== Function ===
The function of OSER1 is not well understood by the scientific community in general. It does contain a domain of unknown function, DUF776, which has a large segment that is well conserved from Caenorhabditis elegans to humans. Its expression is increased in rat cardiomyocytes undergoing hydrogen peroxide induced apoptosis. It has also been shown that its overexpression extends lifespan in silkworms, nematodes, and flies, while its depletion correspondingly shortens lifespan. This effect might be due to its regulation of mitochondrial biology and oxidative stress. Moreover, it promotes reproduction in animal models and is associated with human reproduction and longevity.

=== Expression ===
When looking at the EST Profiles in humans, normal tissue (non-cancerous), expresses at a level of 82 transcripts per million. OSER1 has been shown to increase in expression in rat cardiac myocytes undergoing |H|2|O|2|-induced apoptosis, suggesting a role in cell death. In bladder, cervical, head and neck, non-neoplasia, pancreatic, and prostate cancer cells, there are expression levels lower than normal.

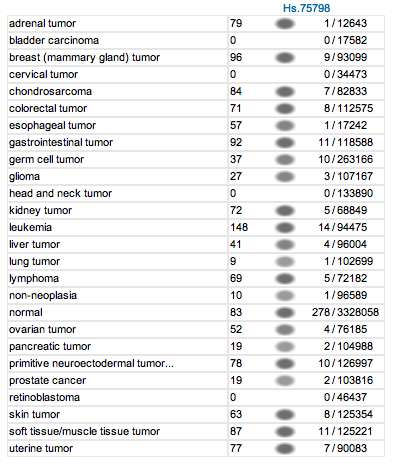
Expression of Perit1 in cancerous cells according to NCBI Geo Profiles.

=== Homology ===
OSER1 gene has no clear paralogs in the human genome. However, it has many orthologs in other organisms, and is conserved highly in organisms such as Xenopus tropicalis and is semi-conserved in the proto-animal Trichoplax adherens at the C-terminus.

The following table presents a select number of the orthologs found.

Scientific name	Common name	Accession number	Sequence length(aa)	Percent identity	Percent Similarity
Homo sapiens	Human	NP_057554.4	292	-	-
Pan troglodytes	Chimpanzee	NP_001151026.1	292	99.7	99
Ailuropoda melanoleuca	Giant Panda	XP_002917406	292	92	96
Equus caballus	Horse	XP_001503005.1	292	91	96
Mus musculus	Mouse	NP_079975	291	87	92
Ornithorhynchus anatinus	Platypus	XP_001513001	293	66	73
Gallus gallus	Chicken	NP_001025152	294	66	75
Xenopus tropicalis	W.Clawed Frog	NP_988917	291	58	69
Danio rerio	Zebrafish	XP_956651	300	45	59
Nasonia vitripennis	Jewel Wasp	XP_003424720	271	58	14
Drosophila melanogaster	Fruit Fly	NP_609391	287	47	18
Trichoplax adhaerens	Trichoplax	XP_002114376	237	46	13

=== Conservation ===
The image below is a multiple sequence alignment comparing the conservation of the OSER1 protein amongst other organisms. The protein is highly conserved in the DUF776 region amongst vertebrates, and also at the C-terminus in eukaryotes.

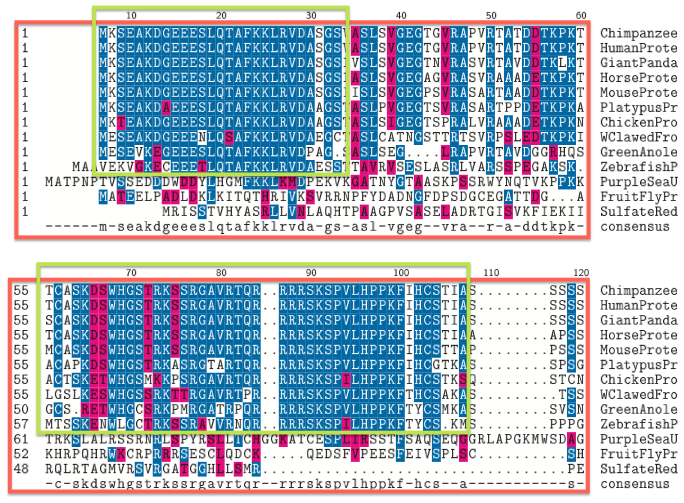
MSA of the orthologs of OSER1 protein

=== Predicted post-translational modification ===
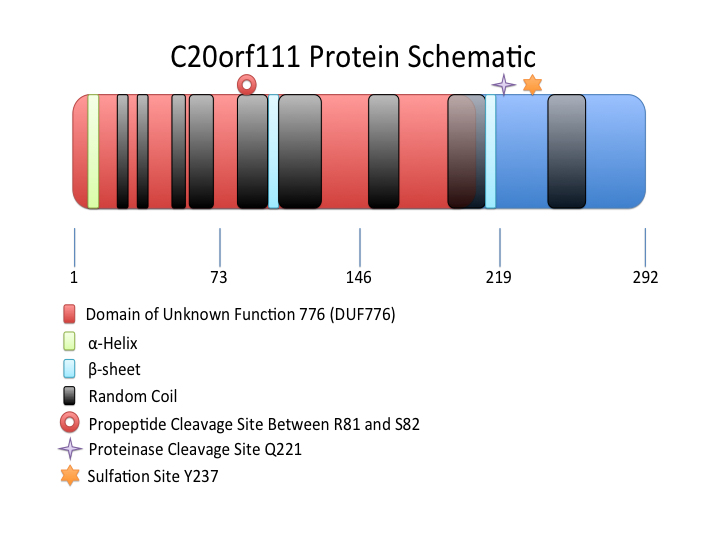
C20orf111 protein schematic showing predicted secondary structure and post-translational modifications.

Using tools at ExPASy the following are predicted post-translational modifications for OSER1.

- Predicted propeptide cleavage site in protein between position R81 and S82.
- 30 predicted Serine phosphorylation sites
- 5 predicted Threonine phosphorylation sites
- 3 predicted Tyrosine phosphorylation sites

=== Predicted secondary structure ===
PELE (Protein Secondary Structure Prediction) was used to predict the secondary structure of OSER1. There is little in the way of β-strand or α-helix secondary structure, but a large part of the protein appears to exist as random coils. This is shown on the image of the OSER1 images to the right.
