= Peter Schuster (theoretical chemist) =

Austrian theoretical chemist (1941–2026)

Peter K. Schuster
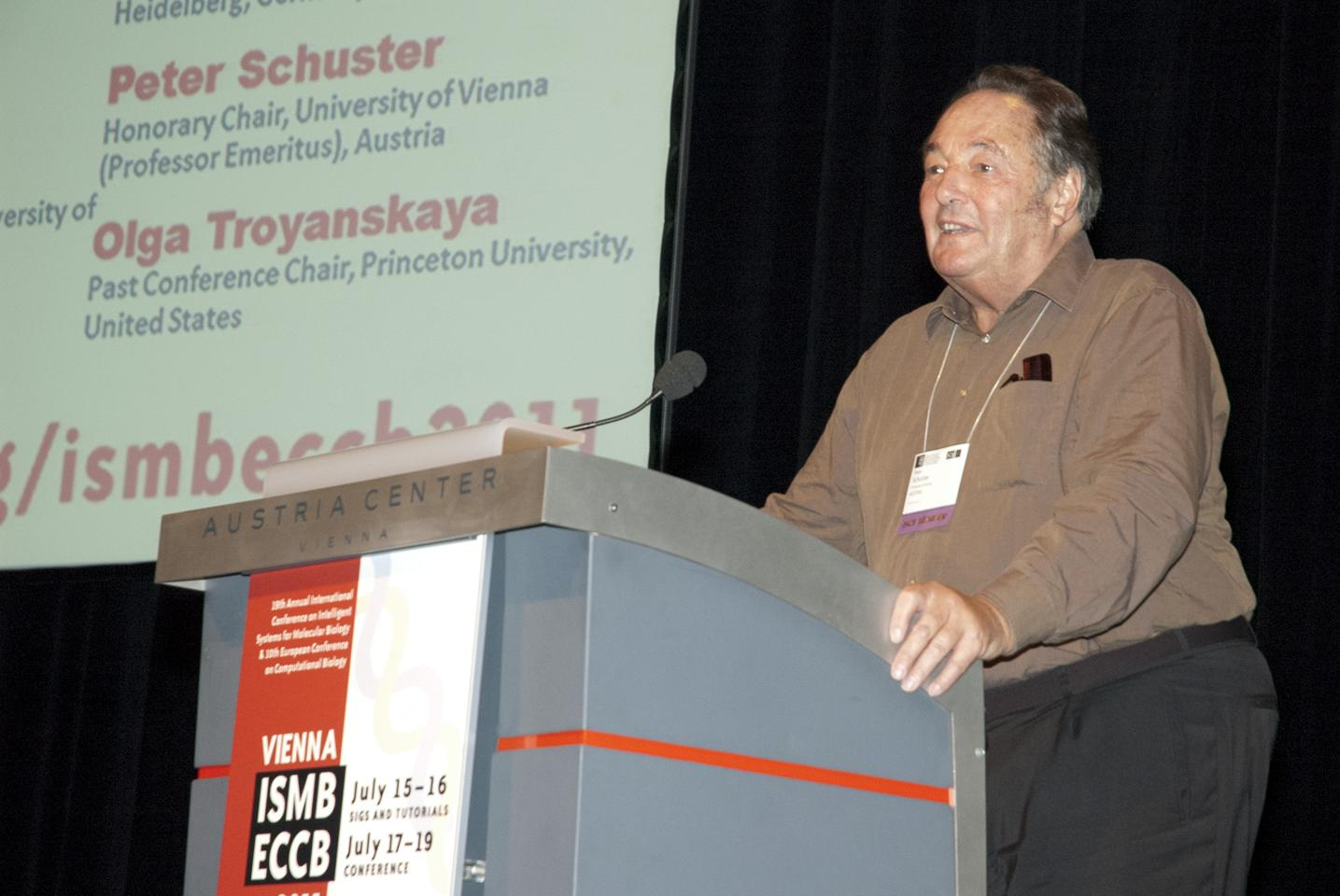
- Born: 7 March 1941; Vienna, Austria
- Died: 15 June 2026 (aged 85)
- Education: University of Vienna (PhD, 1967); Max Planck Institute for Biophysical Chemistry
- Known for: Theory of molecular evolution
- Scientific career
- Fields: Theoretical Biochemistry
- Workplaces: University of Vienna
- Doctoral students: Martin Nowak; Günter P. Wagner; Erich Bornberg-Bauer

Peter K. Schuster (7 March 1941 – 15 June 2026) was an Austrian theoretical chemist known for his work with the German Nobel Laureate Manfred Eigen in developing the quasispecies model. His work has made great strides in the understanding of viruses and their replication, as well as theoretical mechanisms in the origin of life.

== Life and career ==
Schuster was born in Vienna, Austria on 7 March 1941. He graduated with highest honours from a "gymnasium". Schuster studied chemistry and physics at the University of Vienna and earned his PhD in 1967. He was a Postdoc at the Max Planck Institute for Biophysical Chemistry. Together with Eigen, Schuster developed the quasispecies model. Schuster was a full professor of theoretical chemistry at the University of Vienna, the founding director of the Institute of Molecular Biotechnology in Jena, Germany, as well as the head of its Department of Molecular Evolutionary Biology. He was an external faculty member at the Santa Fe Institute. Schuster was later the President of the Austrian Academy of Sciences. He died on 15 June 2026, at the age of 85.

== Honours and awards ==
- 1971: Theodor Körner promotion prize
- 1971: Jubilee Award of the Chemical-Physical Society
- 1983: Erwin Schrödinger Prize of the Austrian Academy of Sciences
- 1989: Dr. Asen Zlatarov prize of the Bulgarian Academy of Sciences
- 1993: Austrian Decoration for Science and Art
- 1993: Member of the German Academy of Sciences Leopoldina
- 1995: Philip Morris Research Prize
- 1995: Josef Loschmidt Medal of the Austrian Chemical Society
- 1997: City of Vienna Prize for Science
- 1997: Cardinal Innitzer Prize for Science
- 1999: Wilhelm Exner Medal of the Austrian Trade Association.
- 2010: Great Silver Medal for Service to the City of Vienna

== See also ==
- What is Life? (Schrödinger)
