= Adi Utarini =

Indonesian public health researcher

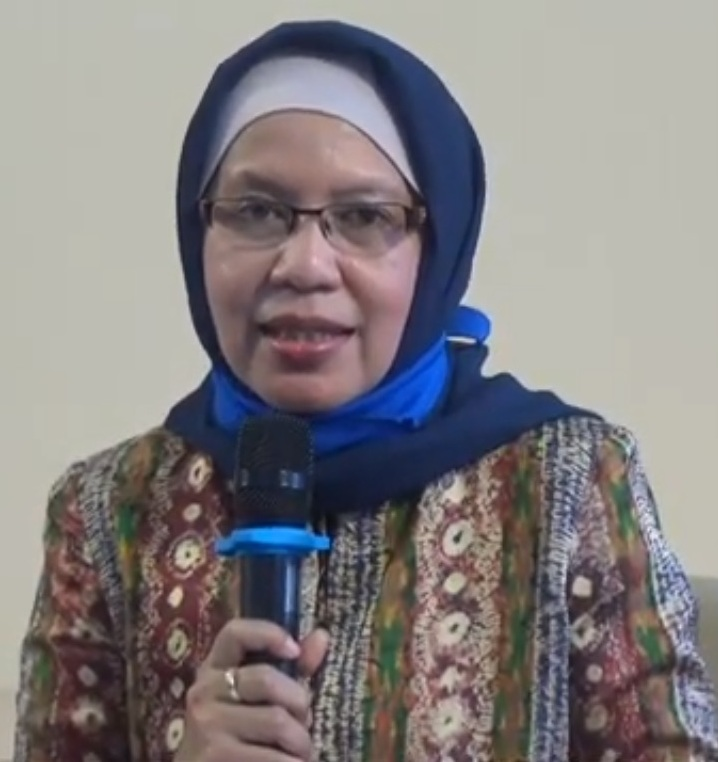
- Utarini in August 2020
- Born: 4 June 1965 (age 61); Yogyakarta, Indonesia
- Education: Umeå University; UCL Great Ormond Street Institute of Child Health; Gadjah Mada University
- Known for: randomized controlled trial of the Wolbachia technique for dengue control
- Awards: Nature's 10 (2020)
- Scientific career
- Workplaces: Gadjah Mada University
- Thesis: Evaluation of the user-provider interface in malaria control programme: the case of Jepara district, Central Java province, Indonesia (2002)
- Website: www.adiutarini.id

Adi Utarini is an Indonesian public health researcher who works on disease control of dengue fever. She serves as Professor of Public Health in the Department of Health and Policy Management at Gadjah Mada University, Yogyakarta. In 2020, she was selected as one of Nature's 10 for pioneering the randomized controlled trial of a dengue prevention technique using mosquitoes carrying the Wolbachia bacteria. In 2021, she was selected as one of TIME's 100 most Influential People of 2021

== Early life and education ==
Utarini was born in Yogyakarta on 4 June 1965. She studied medicine at the Gadjah Mada University, Yogyakarta, Indonesia. After graduating in 1989 she completed two master's degrees, one at the UCL Great Ormond Street Institute of Child Health, United Kingdom (1994) and one at Umeå University, Sweden (1997). She remained at Umeå for her doctoral research, where she focused on a malaria control programme in Central Java. She completed her doctorate in 2002.

== Research and career ==
Utarini focuses on disease control and healthcare quality at Gadjah Mada University, Yogyakarta, Indonesia. She served as Project Leader for World Mosquito Program Yogyakarta. Yogyakarta is a densely populated city of almost 400,000 people with high transmission rates of dengue fever. In 2018, she delivered a TEDx talk on attempts to reduce dengue outbreaks in the city.

Utarini co-led a randomized controlled trial of the technique employing Wolbachia-carrying mosquitoes in reducing the spread of mosquito-borne diseases, such as the dengue fever, starting from 2016 in Yogyakarta. In August 2020 she announced that the method reduced the incidence of dengue fever by 77% during the trial. The Wolbachia bacterium prevents mosquitoes from passing viruses to humans. While the method had been developed since the 1990s at the Monash University, Australia, the trial was "the strongest evidence yet" to support its impact, and the first randomized control trial of this approach. In the trial, the city of Yogyakarta was divided into 24 clusters—12 randomly selected to receive the Wolbachia-infected mosquitoes and the rest to serve as control. As of December 2020, the full data had not been published, but the data was unblinded in June 2020 and a preliminary result was released in August, which showed the 77% reduction in the areas where the Wolbachia-modified mosquitoes were released compared to the control area. Epidemiologists praised the result as "staggering" and "epochal", and an important step in the fight against dengue, which causes about 400 million infections and 25,000 deaths annually, as well as possibly other mosquito-carried diseases.

Utarini was recruited to the effort in 2013, becoming the Indonesia lead scientist of the project. In addition to coordinating the trial, she played an important role in securing the regulatory approval from multiple government ministries. Throughout the trial, Utarini had to gain the support of the local community, which she achieved through wall paintings, short films and face-to-face meetings; the eagerness of the community to participate was one of the successful aspects of the trial.

Between 2015 and 2017 she served in the Research Council of the Indonesian Ministry of Research and Technology. In 2020 Utarini was selected as one of Nature's 10 for pioneering the Wolbachia mosquito trials.

On 13 October 2021, she appointed as Member of BRIN Steering Committee by Joko Widodo.

== Personal life ==
Utarini is known affectionately as "Prof Uut", and is described by colleagues as quiet but persuasive. Her hobbies include cycling and playing the piano. Utarini was married to Iwan Driprahasto, a professor of pharmacology, also at Gadjah Mada. He died of coronavirus disease in March 2020.

== Select publications ==
- Wardhani, Viera; Utarini, Adi; van Dijk, Jitse Pieter; Post, Doeke; Groothoff, Johan Willem (1 March 2009). "Determinants of quality management systems implementation in hospitals". Health Policy. 89 (3): 239–251. doi:10.1016/j.healthpol.2008.06.008. hdl:11370/20c43e00-dc21-4553-885e-ca55575b180e. ISSN 0168-8510. PMID 18752866.
- Claramita, Mora; Utarini, Adi; Soebono, Hardyanto; Van Dalen, Jan; Van der Vleuten, Cees (1 March 2011). "Doctor–patient communication in a Southeast Asian setting: the conflict between ideal and reality". Advances in Health Sciences Education. 16 (1): 69–80. doi:10.1007/s10459-010-9242-7. ISSN 1573-1677. PMC 3074074. PMID 20658353.
- Tantowijoyo, Warsito; Andari, Bekti; Arguni, Eggi; Budiwati, Nida; Nurhayati, Indah; Fitriana, Iva; Ernesia, Inggrid; Daniwijaya, Edwin W.; Supriyati, Endah; Yusdiana, Dedik H.; Victorius, Munasdi (17 April 2020). "Stable establishment of wMel Wolbachia in Aedes aegypti populations in Yogyakarta, Indonesia". PLOS Neglected Tropical Diseases. 14 (4) e0008157. doi:10.1371/journal.pntd.0008157. ISSN 1935-2735. PMC 7190183. PMID 32302295.

Alongside scientific publications, Utarini has written for The Conversation.

== Awards ==
- Civil Service Long Service Medal, 2nd class (2014)
