= Arsenophonus arthropodicus =

Scientific classification (Candidatus)
- Domain: Bacteria
- Phylum: Pseudomonadota
- Class: Gammaproteobacteria
- Order: Enterobacterales
- Family: Morganellaceae
- Genus: Arsenophonus
- Species: "Ca. A. arthropodicus"

Binomial name
- "Candidatus Arsenophonus arthropodicus" Dale et al. 2006

Species of bacterium

Candidatus Arsenophonus arthropodicus is a Gram-negative and intracellular secondary (S) endosymbiont that belongs to the genus Arsenophonus. This bacterium is found in the Hippoboscid louse fly, Pseudolynchia canariensis. S-endosymbionts are commonly found in distinct tissues. Strains of recovered Arsenophonus found in arthropods share 99% sequence identification in the 16S rRNA gene across all species. Arsenophonus-host interactions involve parasitism and mutualism, including a popular mechanism of "male-killing" found commonly in a related species, Arsenophonus nasoniae. This species is considered "Ca. A. arthropodicus" due it being as of yet uncultured.

== Isolation and genome identification ==
=== Isolation ===
Amplified 16S rRNA gene sequences of Phoenix canariensis pupal DNA showed Arsenophonus detection in hemocytes, gut, fat body, and reproductive tissues indicating distribution of bacterium throughout hosts tissues. Lab cultured bacteria found in these tissues show extracellular and intracellular attachment indicating Ca. A. arthropodicus can initiate intracellular infection in the host cells in vitro.

A primary culture of P. canariensis pupae was used to enrich Ca. A. arthropodicus through Gram-positive inhibitor vancomycin and Gram-negative sensitive antibacterial cationic peptides. Ancestral species identification also provides insight into Arsenophonus being a monophyletic clade.

=== Genome identification ===
Contents of the Ca. A. arthropodicus genome are a single chromosome and multiple extrachromosomal elements. Through the use of restriction enzymes Notl and Ascl the approximate chromosome size is 3.51 Mbp. Two species were identified from enrichments based on the behavior of extrachromosomal DNA under alkaline lysis, restriction enzymes, and agarose gel electrophoresis .
