= Arsenophonus =

Scientific classification
- Domain: Bacteria
- Kingdom: Pseudomonadati
- Phylum: Pseudomonadota
- Class: Gammaproteobacteria
- Order: Enterobacterales
- Family: Morganellaceae
- Genus: Arsenophonus; Gherna et al. 1991

Type species
- Arsenophonus nasoniae

Species
- Arsenophonus apicola Nadal et al. 2022; "Candidatus Arsenophonus arthropodicus" Dale et al. 2006; "Candidatus Arsenophonus insecticola" Allen et al. 2007; "Candidatus Arsenophonus lipoptenae" corrig. Nováková et al. 2016; "Candidatus Arsenophonus melophagi" Nováková et al. 2015; Arsenophonus nasoniae Gherna et al. 1991; "Candidatus Arsenophonus nilaparvatae" Fan et al. 2016; "Candidatus Arsenophonus phytopathogenicus" Bressan et al. 2012; "Candidatus Arsenophonus triatominarum" Hypša and Dale 1997

Genus of bacteria

Arsenophonus is a genus of Morganellaceae, of the Gammaproteobacteria. Members of the Arsenophonus genus are increasingly discovered bacterial symbionts of arthropods that are estimated to infect over 5% of arthropod species globally and form a variety of relationships with hosts across the mutualism parasitism continuum. Arsenophonus bacteria have been identified in a diversity of insect taxa, including economically important species such as the Western honey bee and the rice pest Nilaparvata lugens.

The majority of work on Arsenophonus has been done on the type species Arsenophonus nasoniae for which genetic manipulation has been successful in achieving in vivo tracking of the bacterium. Arsenophonus nasoniae infects Nasonia parasitic wasps, is vertically transmitted, passed from a female wasp to the fly host during parasitisation, and then acquired by her hatching larvae feeding on the microbe. It has a male-killing phenotype. Infection with Arsenophonus nasoniae triggers the death of approximately 80% of the wasps male offspring. Killing male offspring is thought to facilitate the spread of Arsenophonus through the host population as it releases more resources to female offspring, and it is the female line that Arsenophonus is transmitted through. However, horizontal transmission during superparasitism of a single fly pupae by multiple wasp females is required for symbiont spread.

Within the genus a number of Arsenophonus strains have known roles as mutualistic endosymbionts. In both Pediculus humanus and Lipoptena cervi Arsenophonus symbionts are essential to host functioning and are involved in vitamin synthesis, and are vertically transmitted across host generations. In other hosts Arsenophonus is suspected to be parasitic and infection acquired through the environment. In the Western honey bee Arsenophonus can be horizontally transmitted via social behaviour, and the presence of Arsenophonus in a colony has been linked to poor bee health. This species has been formally described as Arsenophonus apicola. Arsenophonus apicola can also infect Galleria mellonella waxworms both through injection and orally, indicating it can also develop associations with honey bee associated taxa. The majority of associations between Arsenophonus and host taxa remain uncharacterized.

The diversity of interactions between Arsenophonus and insects has led to the genus being adopted, alongside Sodalis, as one where it is possible to investigate the genetic and evolutionary changes associated with different types of symbiosis. Siozios et al demonstrated early stages of transition to vertical (parent-offspring) transmission were associated with increases in Arsenophonus genome size, associated with proliferation of prophage. This was considered a consequence of loss of CRISPR-Cas defences, hypothesized to be driven by reduce phage predation rates in strongly host associated endosymbionts. Indeed, Arsenophonus nasoniae has one of the more complex microbial genomes, carrying over 50 prophage elements and 17 plasmids.
