= Spalangia cameroni =

Scientific classification
- Kingdom: Animalia
- Phylum: Arthropoda
- Class: Insecta
- Order: Hymenoptera
- Family: Spalangiidae
- Genus: Spalangia
- Species: S. cameroni

Binomial name
- Spalangia cameroni Perkins, 1910

Species of insect of the genus Spalangia

Spalangia cameroni is a species of parasitic wasp in the genus Spalangia that feeds on houseflies. It has a lifecycle of 21–28 days, and is used as a biological pest control.
