= Bioinformatics and Biology Insights =

- Discipline: Bioinformatics
- Language: English
- Edited by: Erich Bornberg-Bauer

Publication details
- Publisher: SAGE Publications
- Open access: Yes

Standard abbreviations
- ISO 4: Bioinform. Biol. Insights

Indexing
- ISSN: 1177-9322

Links
- Journal homepage; Online access

Bioinformatics and Biology Insights is a peer-reviewed open access academic journal focusing on the application of bioinformatics to biological research. The journal was originally published by Libertas Academica, but SAGE Publications became the publisher in September 2016. The journal is edited by Erich Bornberg-Bauer.

== Abstracting and indexing ==
The journal is indexed in

- Emerging Sources Citation Index
- PubMed/PubMed Central
- Scopus
- Selected EBSCO, Elsevier, & Gale databases
