= Intragenomic conflict =

Differential transmission of genes residing in the same genome

Intragenomic conflict refers to the evolutionary phenomenon where genes have phenotypic effects that promote their own transmission in detriment of the transmission of other genes that reside in the same genome. The selfish gene theory postulates that natural selection will increase the frequency of those genes whose phenotypic effects cause their transmission to new organisms, and most genes achieve this by cooperating with other genes in the same genome to build an organism capable of reproducing and/or helping kin to reproduce. The assumption of the prevalence of intragenomic cooperation underlies the organism-centered concept of inclusive fitness. However, conflict among genes in the same genome may arise both in events related to reproduction (a selfish gene may "cheat" and increase its own presence in gametes or offspring above the expected according to fair Mendelian segregation and fair gametogenesis) and altruism (genes in the same genome may disagree on how to value other organisms in the context of helping kin because coefficients of relatedness diverge between genes in the same genome).

== Nuclear genes ==
Autosomic genes usually have the same mode of transmission in sexually reproducing species due to the fairness of Mendelian segregation, but conflicts among alleles of autosomic genes may arise when an allele cheats during gametogenesis (segregation distortion) or eliminates embryos that do not contain it (lethal maternal effects). An allele may also directly convert its rival allele into a copy of itself (homing endonucleases). Finally, mobile genetic elements completely bypass Mendelian segregation, being able to insert new copies of themselves into new positions in the genome (transposons).

=== Segregation distortion ===
In principle, the two parental alleles have equal probabilities of being present in the mature gamete. However, there are several mechanisms that lead to an unequal transmission of parental alleles from parents to offspring. One example is a gene drive complex, called a Segregation Distorter (SD), that "cheats" during meiosis or gametogenesis and thus is present in more than half of the functional gametes. The most studied examples are SD in Drosophila melanogaster (fruit fly), t haplotype in Mus musculus (mouse) and sk in Neurospora spp. (fungus). Possible examples have also been reported in humans. Segregation distorters that are present on sex chromosomes (as is the case with the X chromosome in several Drosophila species) are denominated sex-ratio distorters, as they induce a sex-ratio bias in the offspring of the carrier individual.

==== Gamete killing ====
Gamete killers, a type of meiotic driver, are the most commonly identified type of segregation distorter. Gamete killers are often referred to as sperm killers, pollen killers, or spore killers depending on the clade in which they are found. They are most commonly expressed in males though there is one system in mice that appears to act via egg sabotage during female gametogenesis. Most gamete killer systems can be grouped into two sub groups: Driver-Target systems and Toxin-Antidote systems. In Driver-Target systems, the driving chromosome (containing the main drive locus and insensitive target locus) targets wild type chromosomes that contain a sensitive target locus. Importantly in this kind of system, recombination between the driver and target is often suppressed to avoid the formation of a "suicide chromosome". An example of a Driver-Target system is the coadapted gene complex in Drosophila melanogaster called Segregation Distorter (SD). The main drive locus, a truncated tandem duplication of the gene RanGAP on chromosome 2L (Sd-RanGAP) targets a repetitive array of satellite DNA on chromosome 2R called Responder. The mechanism of SD is unknown, but through some interaction with Responder, Sd-RanGAP induces a chromatin condensation defect in wild type sperm that results in their elimination. Toxin-Antidote systems on the other hand consist of a drive locus that produces both a toxin and an antidote. The toxin is fatal to gametes that do not contain the antidote which results in the death of those gametes. Spore killers, like sk and wtf, are frequently Toxin-Antidote systems.

==== True meiotic drive ====
Other systems do not involve gamete destruction, but rather use the asymmetry of meiosis in females: the driving allele ends up in the oocyte instead of in the polar bodies with a probability greater than one half. This is termed true meiotic drive, as it does not rely on a post-meiotic mechanism. The best-studied examples include the neocentromeres (knobs) of maize, as well as several chromosomal rearrangements in mammals. The general molecular evolution of centromeres is likely to involve such mechanisms.

=== Lethal maternal effects ===
The Medea gene causes the death of progeny from a heterozygous mother that do not inherit it. It occurs in the flour beetle (Tribolium castaneum). Maternal-effect selfish genes have been successfully synthesized in the lab.

=== Transposons ===
Transposons are autonomous replicating genes that encode the ability to move to new positions in the genome and therefore accumulate in the genomes. They replicate themselves in spite of being detrimental to the rest of the genome. They are often called 'jumping genes' or parasitic DNA and were discovered by Barbara McClintock in 1944.

=== Homing endonuclease genes ===
Homing endonuclease genes (HEG) convert their rival allele into a copy of themselves, and are thus inherited by nearly all meiotic daughter cells of a heterozygote cell. They achieve this by encoding an endonuclease which breaks the rival allele. This break is repaired by using the sequence of the HEG as template.

HEGs encode sequence-specific endonucleases. The recognition sequence (RS) is 15–30 bp long and usually occurs once in the genome. HEGs are located in the middle of their own recognition sequences. Most HEGs are encoded by self-splicing introns (group I & II) and inteins. Inteins are internal protein fragments produced from protein splicing and usually contain endonuclease and splicing activities. The allele without the HEGs are cleaved by the homing endonuclease and the double-strand break are repaired by homologous recombination (gene conversion) using the allele containing HEGs as template. Both chromosomes will contain the HEGs after repair.

=== B-chromosome ===
B-chromosomes are nonessential chromosomes; not homologous with any member of the normal (A) chromosome set; morphologically and structurally different from the As; and they are transmitted at higher-than-expected frequencies, leading to their accumulation in progeny. In some cases, there is strong evidence to support the contention that they are simply selfish and that they exist as parasitic chromosomes. They are found in all major taxonomic groupings of both plants and animals.

== Cytoplasmic genes ==
Since nuclear and cytoplasmic genes usually have different modes of transmission, intragenomic conflicts between them may arise. Mitochondria and chloroplasts are two examples of sets of cytoplasmic genes that commonly have exclusive maternal inheritance, similar to endosymbiont parasites in arthropods, like Wolbachia.

=== Males as dead-ends to cytoplasmic genes ===
Anisogamy generally produces zygotes that inherit cytoplasmic elements exclusively from the female gamete. Thus, males represent dead-ends to these genes. Because of this fact, cytoplasmic genes have evolved a number of mechanisms to increase the production of female descendants and eliminate offspring not containing them.

=== Feminization ===
Male organisms are converted into females by cytoplasmic inherited protists (Microsporidia) or bacteria (Wolbachia), regardless of nuclear sex-determining factors. This occurs in amphipod and isopod Crustacea and Lepidoptera.

=== Male-killing ===
Male embryos (in the case of cytoplasmic inherited bacteria) or male larvae (in the case of Microsporidia) are killed. In the case of embryo death, this diverts investment from males to females who can transmit these cytoplasmic elements (for instance, in ladybird beetles, infected female hosts eat their dead male brothers, which is positive from the viewpoint of the bacterium). In the case of microsporidia-induced larval death, the agent is transmitted out of the male lineage (through which it cannot be transmitted) into the environment, where it may be taken up again infectiously by other individuals. Male-killing occurs in many insects. In the case of male embryo death, a variety of bacteria have been implicated, including Wolbachia.

=== Male-sterility ===
In some cases anther tissue (male gametophyte) is killed by mitochondria in monoecious angiosperms, increasing energy and material spent in developing female gametophytes. This leads to a shift from monoecy to gynodioecy, where part of the plants in the population are male-sterile.

=== Parthenogenesis induction ===
In certain haplodiploid Hymenoptera and mites, in which males are produced asexually, Wolbachia and Cardinium can induce duplication of the chromosomes and thus convert the organisms into females. The cytoplasmic bacterium forces haploid cells to go through incomplete mitosis to produce diploid cells which therefore will be female. This produces an entirely female population. If antibiotics are administered to populations which have become asexual in this way, they revert to sexuality instantly, as the cytoplasmic bacteria forcing this behaviour upon them are removed.

=== Cytoplasmic incompatibility ===
In many arthropods, zygotes produced by sperm of infected males and ova of non-infected females can be killed by Wolbachia or Cardinium.

== Evolution of sex ==
Conflict between chromosomes has been proposed as an element in the evolution of sex.

== See also ==
- Green-beard effect
