= Nasonia giraulti =

Scientific classification
- Domain: Eukaryota
- Kingdom: Animalia
- Phylum: Arthropoda
- Class: Insecta
- Order: Hymenoptera
- Family: Pteromalidae
- Genus: Nasonia
- Species: N. giraulti

Binomial name
- Nasonia giraulti Darling, 1990

Species of wasp

Nasonia giraulti is a species of pteromalid wasp in the family Pteromalidae. It can be differentiated from other species in its genus by its antennae. The species can be found in eastern North America. It is a parasitoid of bird blow fly pupae.
