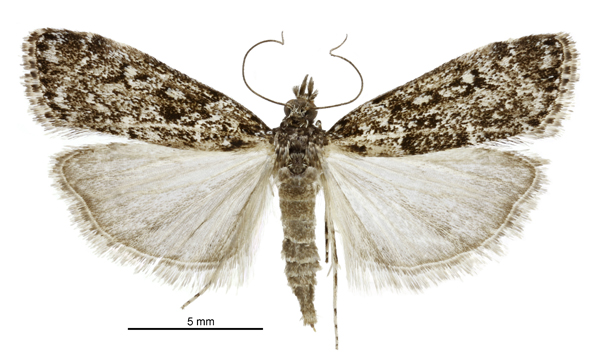
- Female
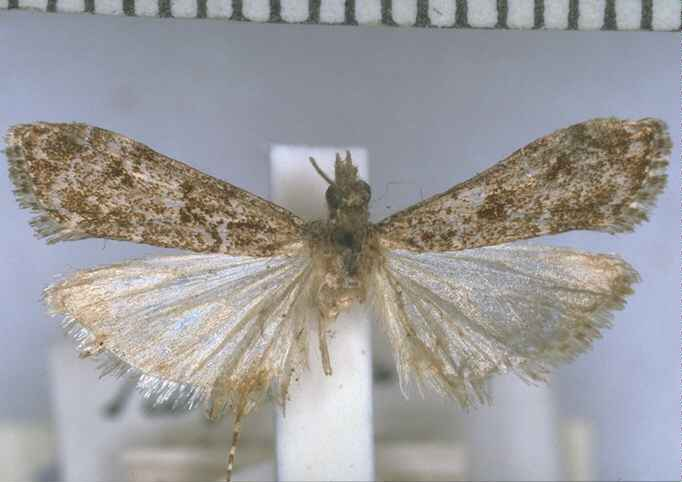
- Male holotype

Scientific classification
- Kingdom: Animalia
- Phylum: Arthropoda
- Clade: Pancrustacea
- Class: Insecta
- Order: Lepidoptera
- Family: Crambidae
- Genus: Eudonia
- Species: E. philerga

Binomial name
- Eudonia philerga (Meyrick, 1884)

Synonyms
- Scoparia philerga Meyrick, 1884

= Eudonia philerga =

Species of moth endemic to New Zealand

Eudonia philerga is a species of moth of the family Crambidae. This species was first described by Edward Meyrick. It is endemic to New Zealand, found throughout the country, and regarded as common. Larvae feed on moss. Adult moths have been observed on the wing more frequently from October to April, and are attracted to light.

== Taxonomy ==
This species was named Scoparia philerga by Edward Meyrick in 1884. Meyrick gave a detailed description of the adult moth in 1885. George Hudson discussed and illustrated this species in his 1928 publication The butterflies and moths of New Zealand. In 1988 John S. Dugdale placed this species in the genus Eudonia. The male holotype specimen, collected at Lake Wakatipu, is held at the Natural History Museum, London.

== Description ==
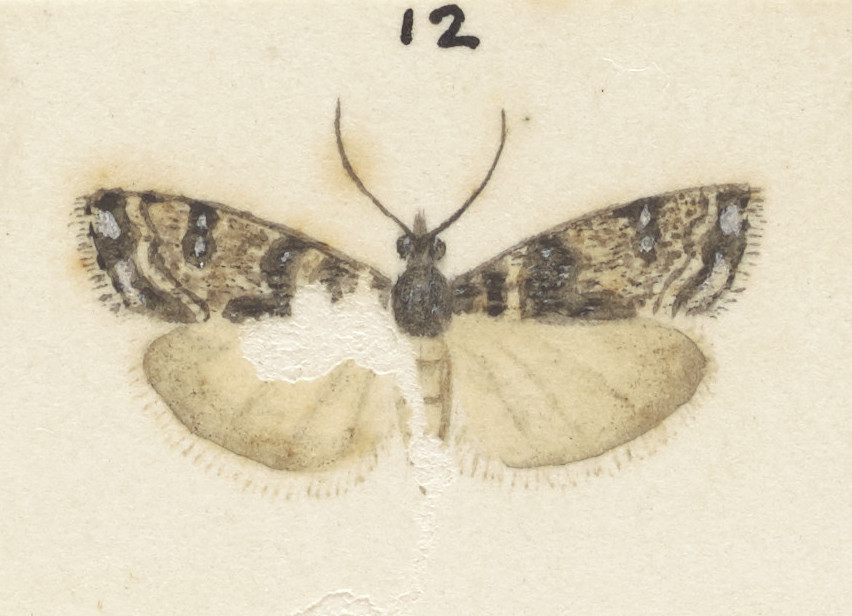
E. philerga illustrated by Hudson.

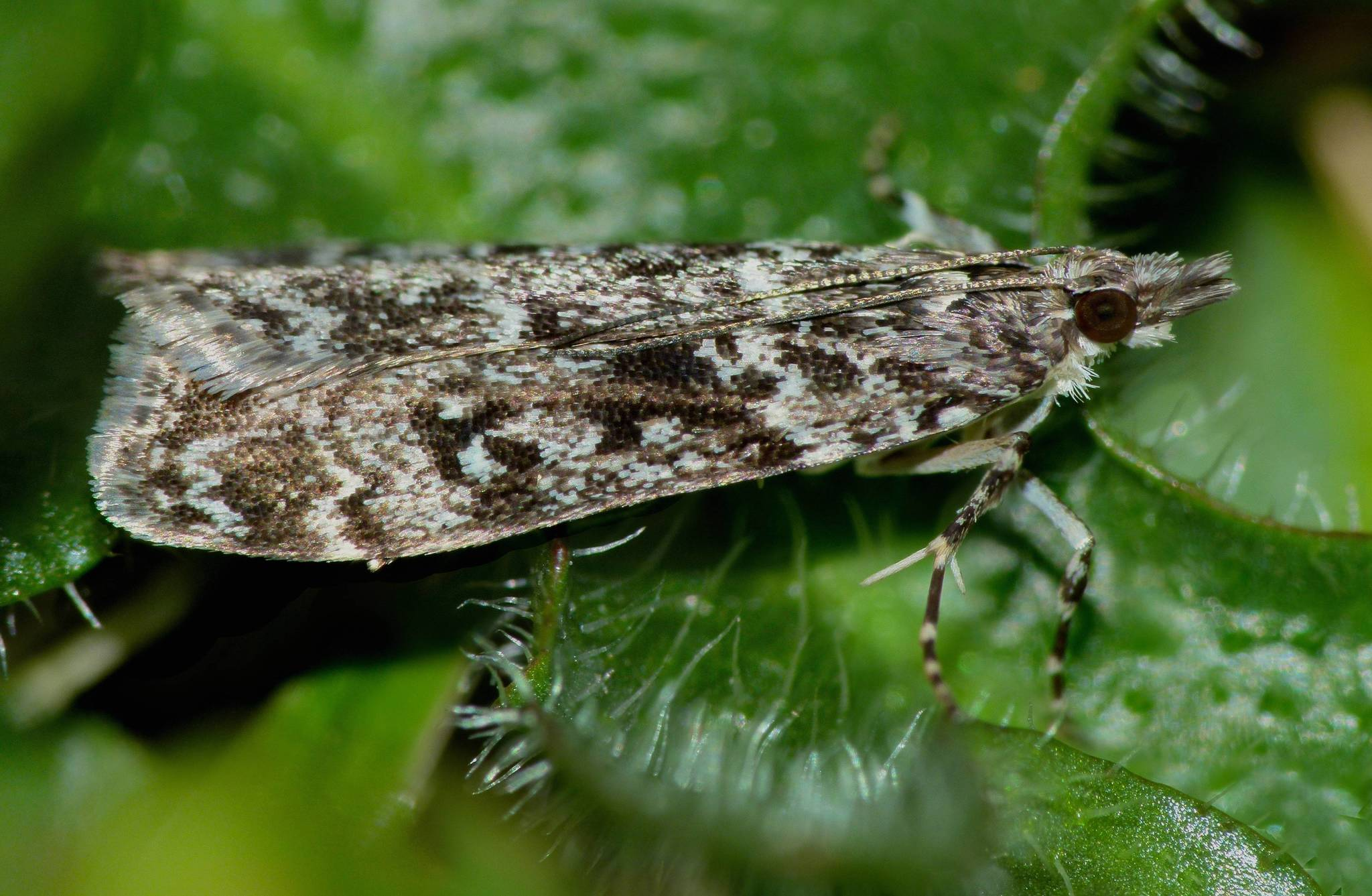
Observation of live E. philerga

The larvae of E. philerga are about 1/2 inch long and coloured a dull dark green with a head that is reddish brown. They have large blackish green protuberances. This colouration provides excellent camouflage as, when still, larvae are difficult to see amongst their host plant. The pupa is formed amongst moss and surrounded by a thin cocoon.

Hudson described the adult of the species as follows:

The expansion of the wings is a little over 3/4 inch. The fore-wings are rather narrow, dull white, speckled and obscurely marked with black. There is a short thick black streak at the base, the first line is white, obscurely margined with black towards the termen; the orbicular and claviform form an obscure black patch; the reniform is 8-shaped white margined with black and touching a small black mark on the costa; the second line is white, distinct, edged with black, the terminal space is black except the sub-terminal line, which is frequently broken and often touches the second line near the middle; there is a terminal row of white dots. The hind-wings are pale yellowish-white strongly shaded with grey towards the termen. The cilia of all the wings are dull white with a darker line.

Hudson noted that when at rest on trees or rocks, the colouration of the adult moth also provides excellent camouflage, safeguarding it from predators.

== Distribution ==
This species is endemic to New Zealand. It is found throughout the country and regarded as being common.

== Behaviour ==
It has been hypothesised that this species has two broods; and that adults of the autumn generation hibernate, since adults have been taken by light trapping during winter. Adults are on the wing throughout the year though more frequently from October to April. The adults of this species are attracted to light and have been collected via a mercury vapour light trap.

== Host species ==
The larvae of this species feed on mosses found on wood.

== Threats ==
A specimen of this species has been tested for Wolbachia infection; the result of this test was negative.
