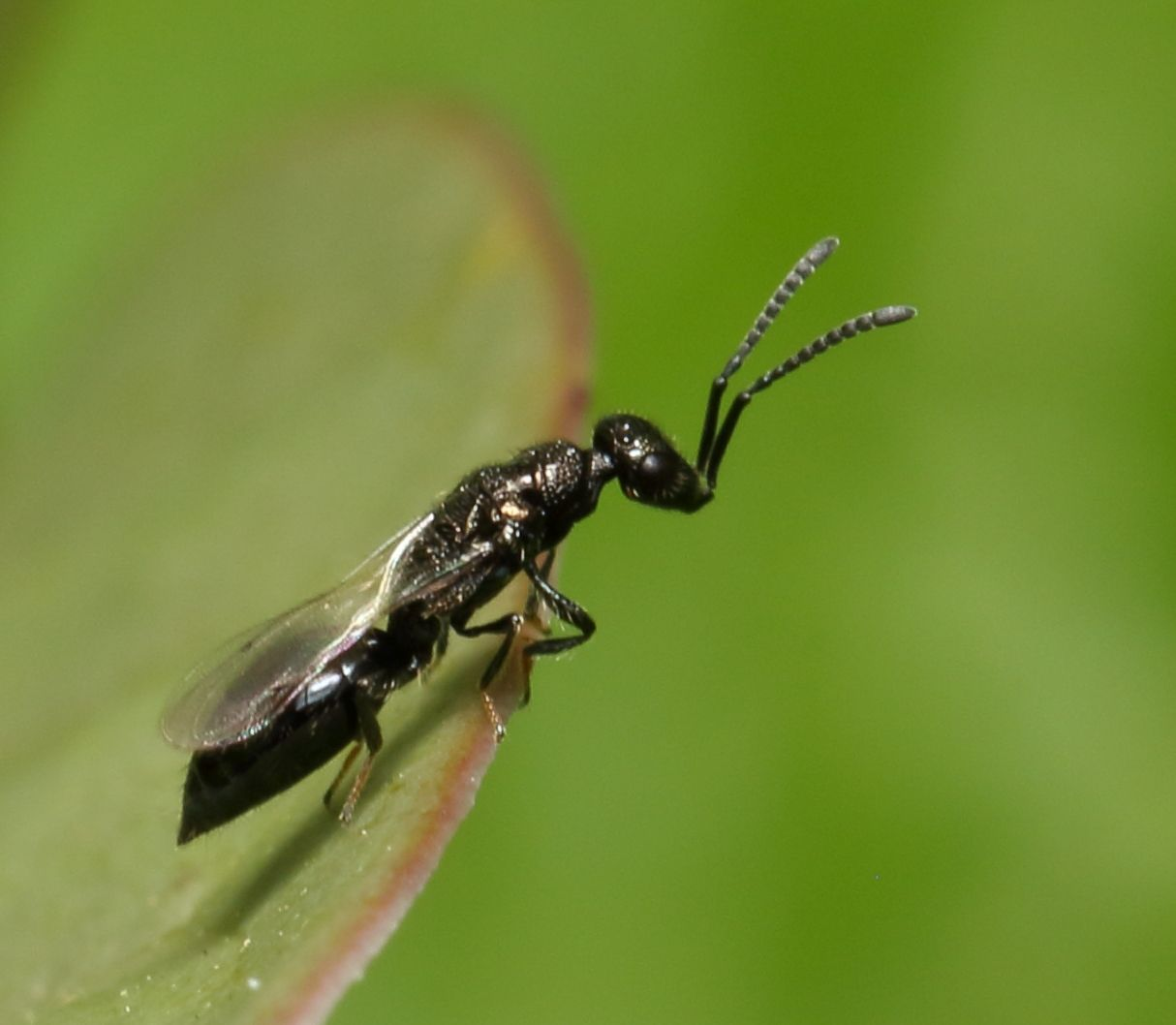
- Spalangia sp.

Scientific classification
- Kingdom: Animalia
- Phylum: Arthropoda
- Class: Insecta
- Order: Hymenoptera
- Family: Spalangiidae
- Subfamily: Spalangiinae
- Genus: Spalangia; Latreille, 1805

= Spalangia =

Genus of wasps

Spalangia is a genus of parasitoid wasp in the family Spalangiidae. Species include Spalangia cameroni and Spalangia endius.

== Species ==
The following species are known:

- Spalangia cameroni
- Spalangia chontalensis
- Spalangia drosophilae
- Spalangia endius
- Spalangia entellus
- Spalangia erythromera
- Spalangia gemina
- Spalangia haematobiae
- Spalangia hematobia
- Spalangia lanaiensis
- Spalangia nigra
- Spalangia nigripes
- Spalangia nigroaenea
- Spalangia rugulosa
- Spalangia turneri

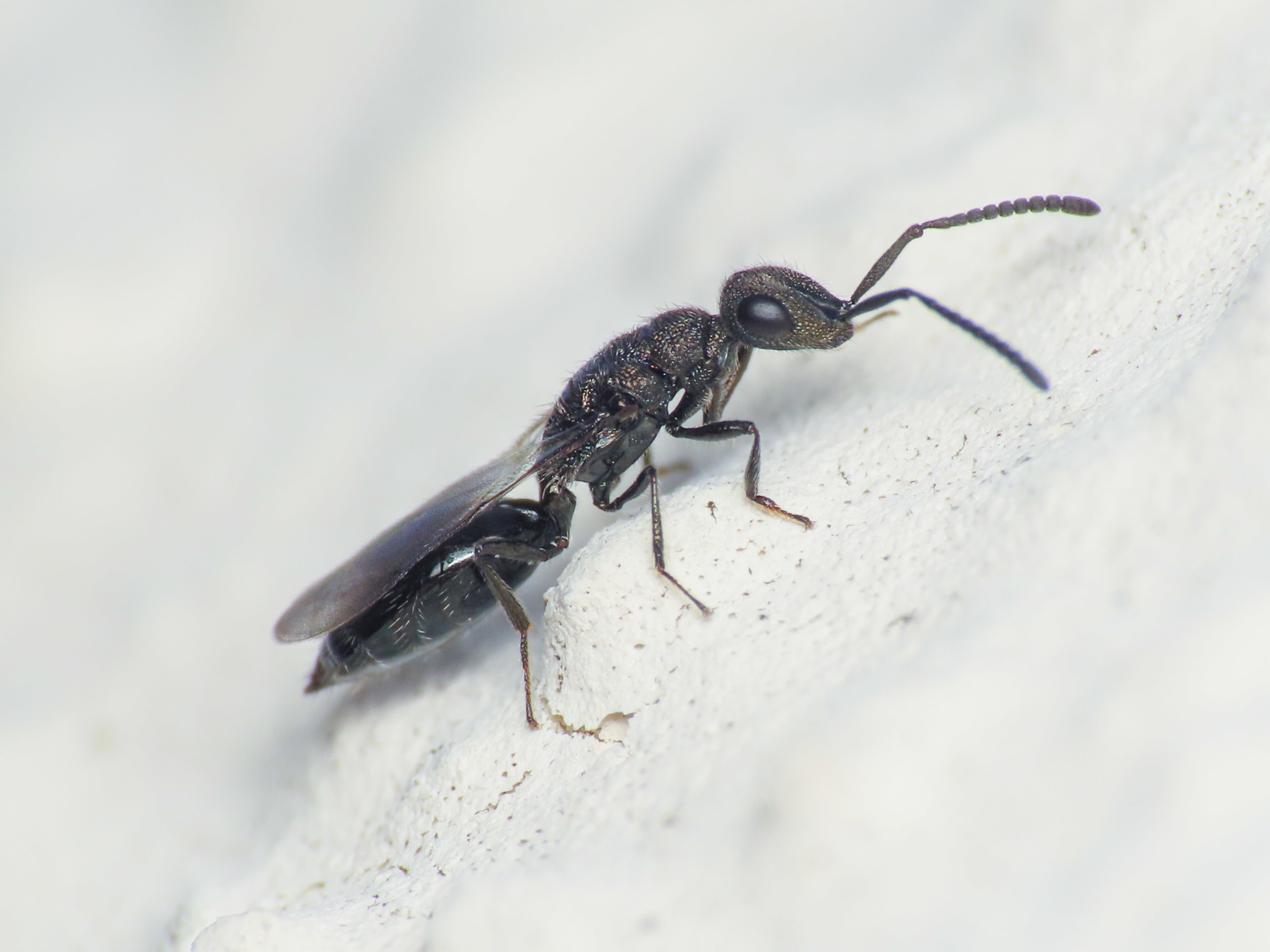
Spalangia rugulosa
