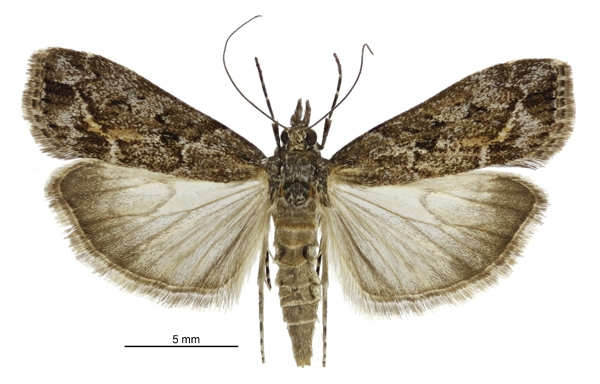
- Female

Scientific classification
- Kingdom: Animalia
- Phylum: Arthropoda
- Class: Insecta
- Order: Lepidoptera
- Family: Crambidae
- Genus: Eudonia
- Species: E. submarginalis

Binomial name
- Eudonia submarginalis (Walker, 1863)

Synonyms
- Hypochalcia submarginalis Walker, 1863; Nephopteryx maoriella Walker, 1866; Scoparia submarginalis (Walker, 1863

= Eudonia submarginalis =

Species of moth

Eudonia submarginalis is a species of moth in the family Crambidae. It was described by Francis Walker in 1863. It is endemic to New Zealand.

The larvae of this species feed on lichens, bryophytes and grasses. Adults of the species have been observed visiting the flowers of Leptospermum scoparium, Olearia virgata, Helichrysum intermedium and Dracophyllum acerosum likely feeding from and pollinating them.
