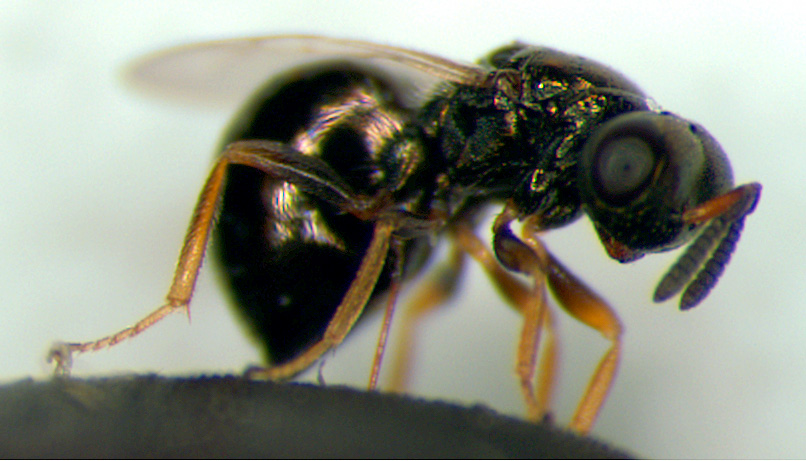
- Nasonia vitripennis

Scientific classification
- Kingdom: Animalia
- Phylum: Arthropoda
- Class: Insecta
- Order: Hymenoptera
- Family: Pteromalidae
- Subfamily: Pteromalinae
- Genus: Nasonia; Ashmead, 1904

Species
- Nasonia giraulti Nasonia longicornis Nasonia oneida Nasonia vitripennis

Synonyms
- Mormoniella Ashmead, 1904

= Nasonia =

Genus of wasps

Nasonia are a genus of small pteromalid parasitoid wasps that sting and lay eggs in the pupae of various flies. The fly species that Nasonia usually parasitize are primarily blow flies and flesh flies, making Nasonia a useful tool for biocontrol of these pest flies. The small match-head sized wasps are also referred to as jewel wasps based on the emerald sheen of their exoskeleton (visible in the adjacent image).

The wasp genus has acquired genes from the Pox virus and from Wolbachia in less than 100,000 years. Nasonia and other parasitic Hymenopterans appear to have evolved at a faster rate than most other insect orders, and it has been noted by a number of authors that this could be due to Wolbachia, different strains of which arguably infect or are endosymbionts of the differing species of Nasonia.

There are currently four described species in the genus Nasonia, N. vitripennis, N. longicornis, N. giraulti, and N. oneida. N. vitripennis is found worldwide; N. giraulti is found in eastern North America and N. longicornis is found in western North America. N. oneida was the most recently discovered, having been distinguished from N. giraulti as a separate species in 2010.

== Nasonia development ==
Upon encountering a suitable pupal host the Nasonia female uses her ovipositor (stinger) to drill a small hole through its chitinous outer puparium. She then commences to inject venom into the host before laying 20 to 40 small eggs on the host's outer integument. After approximately 36 hours the eggs hatch and the small Nasonia larvae use their mandibles to feed on the host. Though the Nasonia young develop inside of the host's puparium, as they do not directly enter the body of their prey they are considered ectoparasites.

Unlike the venom of bees, which is primarily used in defense, Nasonia venom functions to prime the host as a good food source. Specifically, the venom causes developmental arrest in the host, thus redirecting energy from this process toward pathways that produce nutrients required by the developing Nasonia larvae.

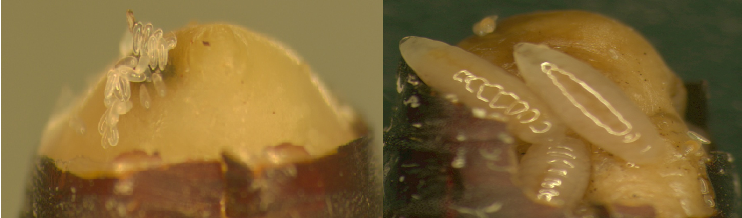
The host puparium partially removed to show the Nasonia eggs (left) and 5-day-old larvae (right)

After seven days the larvae stop feeding and move into the pupal stage where they remain for another 7 days, leading to a total developmental time from egg to adult of approximately 14 days at 25 °C. The Nasonia males, which emerge several hours before the females, escape by chewing small holes in the hosts puparium. The males wait by the escape holes for the emerging females (typically their sisters) upon which they immediately court in the attempt at mating.

== Genomics ==
In 2010 the Nasonia genome was announced after work over four years by an international consortium of research groups financed by the National Human Genome Research Institute. It is expected that the discovery will lead to applications in pest control.
