= Nasonia longicornis =

Scientific classification
- Domain: Eukaryota
- Kingdom: Animalia
- Phylum: Arthropoda
- Class: Insecta
- Order: Hymenoptera
- Family: Pteromalidae
- Genus: Nasonia
- Species: N. longicornis

Binomial name
- Nasonia longicornis Darling, 1990

Species of wasp

Nasonia longicornis is a species of pteromalid wasp in the family Pteromalidae. It can be identified by the structure of its antennae. It is a parasitoid of Protocalliphora pupae, usually found in birds' nests. The species is found in western North America. Females usually only mate once in their lifetime.
