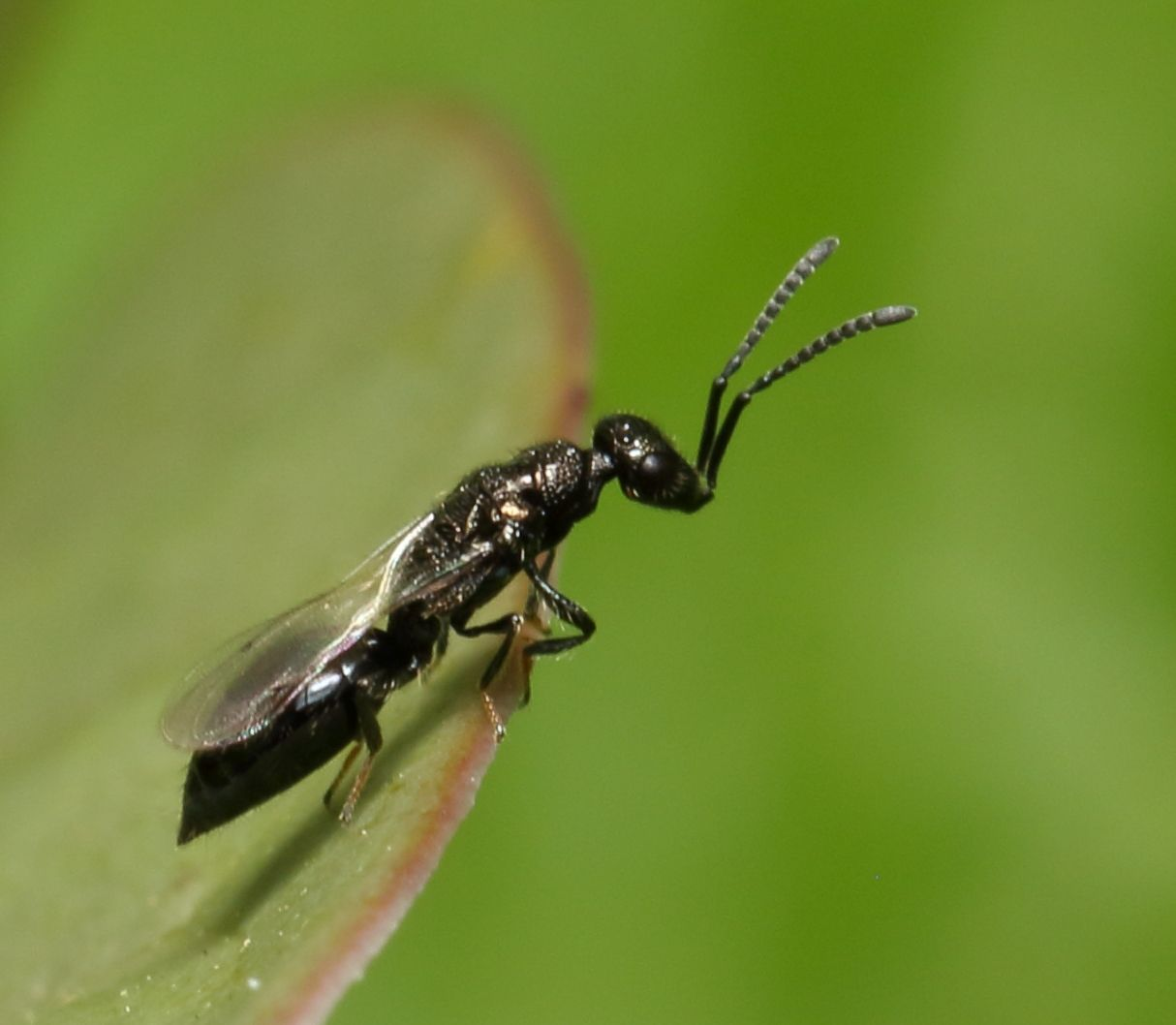
- Spalangia sp.

Scientific classification
- Domain: Eukaryota
- Kingdom: Animalia
- Phylum: Arthropoda
- Class: Insecta
- Order: Hymenoptera
- Superfamily: Chalcidoidea
- Family: Spalangiidae; Haliday, 1833

Subfamilies
- Spalangiinae, Erotolepsiinae

= Spalangiidae =

Family of wasps

Spalangiidae is a family of chalcid wasps that are parasitoids of flies. The two subfamilies (Spalangiinae and Erotolepsiinae) were moved from the family Pteromalidae to create this family in 2022. They are now known to be more closely related to the planidial clade (Eucharitidae + Perilampidae + Chrysolampidae + Eutrichosomatidae) of chalcid wasps than to the core Pteromalidae.

== Description ==
Antenna usually with 8 flagellomeres, including a single-segment clava; antennal toruli (bases) are placed very low on the head in most species; mandibles usually with 2 or 3 teeth; all legs with 5 tarsomeres; protibial spur stout and curved. Eunotopsia differs from the other genera in having 11 flagellomeres including 3 clavomeres, toruli placed higher on the head, and having undivided mandibles. In the Spalangiinae the toruli are placed on lobes that overhang the clypeus and labrum. This distinctive antennal placement and the prognathous head (i.e. the head is held with the mouthparts projecting forwards) make it easy to place members of Spalangiinae.

== Subfamilies, genera and distribution ==
Erotolepsiinae:

- Balrogia - Brazil
- Erotolepsia - Grenada, St Vincent & Grenadines
- Eunotopsia - New South Wales (Australia )
- Papuopsia - Papua New Guinea; Kerala (India), Sri Lanka

Spalangiinae:

- Playaspalangia - Mexico, Sri Lanka
- Spalangia - Worldwide
