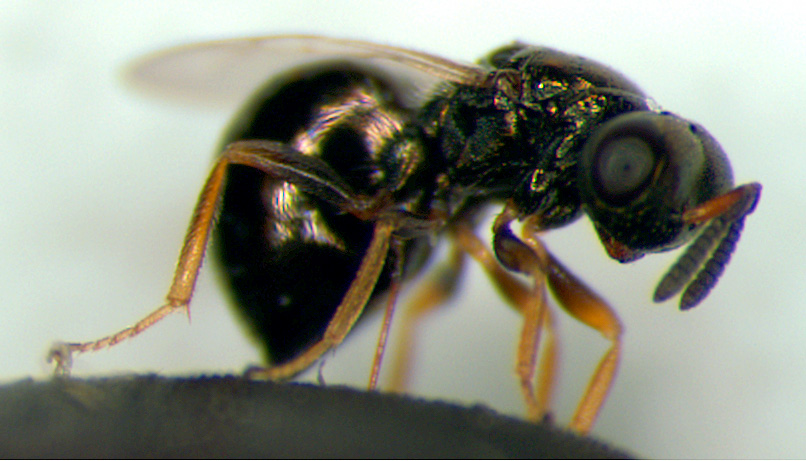
- Nasonia vitripennis female

Scientific classification
- Kingdom: Animalia
- Phylum: Arthropoda
- Class: Insecta
- Order: Hymenoptera
- Family: Pteromalidae
- Genus: Nasonia
- Species: N. vitripennis

Binomial name
- Nasonia vitripennis (Walker, 1836)

= Nasonia vitripennis =

Species of insect

Nasonia vitripennis (or Mormoniella vitripennis, or Nasonia brevicornis) is one of four known species under the genus Nasonia - small parasitoid wasps that afflict the larvae of parasitic carrion flies such as blowflies and flesh flies, which themselves are parasitic toward nestling birds. It is the best known and most widely studied of the parasitoid wasps, and their study forms a vital part of the information used to describe the order Hymenoptera, along with information from bees and ants. This parasitoid behaviour makes the wasps an interest for the development of biopesticide and biological systems for controlling unwanted insects.

The biosynthetic pathways for sex pheromones in Hymenoptera, determination of sex in development, and many protein and gene product comparisons to other insects have been studied using N. vitripennis (most often contrasted against the Western honey bee, Apis mellifera).

Nasonia vitripennis also has a high variety of proteins that have been discovered for venom and detection of odours and has repetitive DNA; this information has been made easier for study since the complete sequencing and release of the genome of N. vitripennis in 2010.

== Physiology ==
As in other Nasonia wasps, N. vitripennis is haplodiploid, having haploid males and diploid females, and measures from 2–3 mm in length, with larger and darker-colored females than males. These wasps, like most other insects, show much sexual dimorphism, and females tend to be less easy to distinguish by species than males. N. vitripennis females have a straight stigmal vein (a short branch from the stigma of the forewing), in comparison to the varying curvature in its three sister species. Males are generally distinguished using antenna and wing shape. Male N. vitripennis wasps have a spindle-shaped scape (the lower half of the antenna), meaning it is wider in the middle than at either of the joint ends. (This is in comparison to the “angulate” shape seen in N. giraulti and N. oneida, or the cylindrical shape of N. longicornis). The antennal flagellum is also shorter and wider than in the other three species of Nasonia. Male N. vitripennis have small forewings, in comparison to other Nasonia relatives.

== Pheromones and sexual behaviour ==
Male N. vitripennis wasps produce pheromones from papillae inside a rectal vesicle, and release pheromones through the anus. Female wasps show no similar organ for pheromone release. Prior research has pointed to the rectal papillae (inside the rectal vesicle) for the purpose of water and electrolyte resorption, since the adult male wasps rarely feed; however, localization techniques, pheromone biosynthesis data and observations of wasp behaviour (tapping abdomen on the ground, leaving traces of pheromone) all point to these organs being used in sexual communication.

Cephalic pheromones are also present in N. vitripennis, coming from the mouth of the males during courtship, which females contact with their antennae while signaling their receptivity to mating. The distinctive chemical mixture in male pheromones strongly attracts virgin females; mated females (and females merely exposed to the male pheromones) experimentally have shown little to no attraction.

After mating, females then turn their attention to searching for a host larva in which to oviposit – a behaviour which reroutes wasted time that would be spent over-mating to searching for a suitable host. This behavioural ‘switch’ is thought to be caused by pheromones alone, rather than by sperm transfer, as seems to be the case in other insects. Egg-laying in N. vitripennis occurs in the same fashion in all known species of Nasonia, where a mated female drills into and deposits her eggs under the puparum of fly larvae.

== Noncomplementary sex determination ==
Hymenoptera largely reproduce through facultative parthenogenesis, where haploid males develop from unfertilized eggs (arrhenotoky) and diploid females develop from fertilized eggs.

Sex determination in all Nasonia has been shown to be due mainly to fertilization status (fertilized or unfertilized as an egg), as well as by chromosome number. Nasonia and other Chalcid wasps use a different sex determination system than a large portion of Hymenopterans (including Honey bees), who use CSD (complementary sex determination), where sex is determined by homozygous or heterozygous alleles of a single gene. The most recent accepted model for this non-CSD system is called Maternal Effect Genomic Imprinting Sex Determination (MEGISD). This model involves a masculinizing/virilizing maternal effect gene that “imprints upon” the cytoplasmic component of oocytes, and an “unimprinted” paternal contribution (in female offspring) that provides a counter effect to virilization and allows for female development to occur. Since all diploid eggs become female (due to the factor originating in the male genetic contribution that prevents masculinization), this differs from CSD in that under CSD, males can be diploid if they are homozygous or hemizygous.

== Wolbachia ==
Wolbachia are maternally inherited, and exist in multiple insect species. Multiple strains of Wolbachia have been noted in even single strains of Nasonia. These bacteria are a very well-documented endosymbiont (arguably parasite) of the wasps that can have consequences for fertility when their presence is altered. It has been suggested that Wolbachia have assisted with genetic divergence through buildup of mutations and selecting for compensatory mechanisms, causing the emergence of new strains to occur more quickly. This is through a model of ‘mitochondrial sweeping’, when Wolbachia bring mitochondria from one host population to another.
