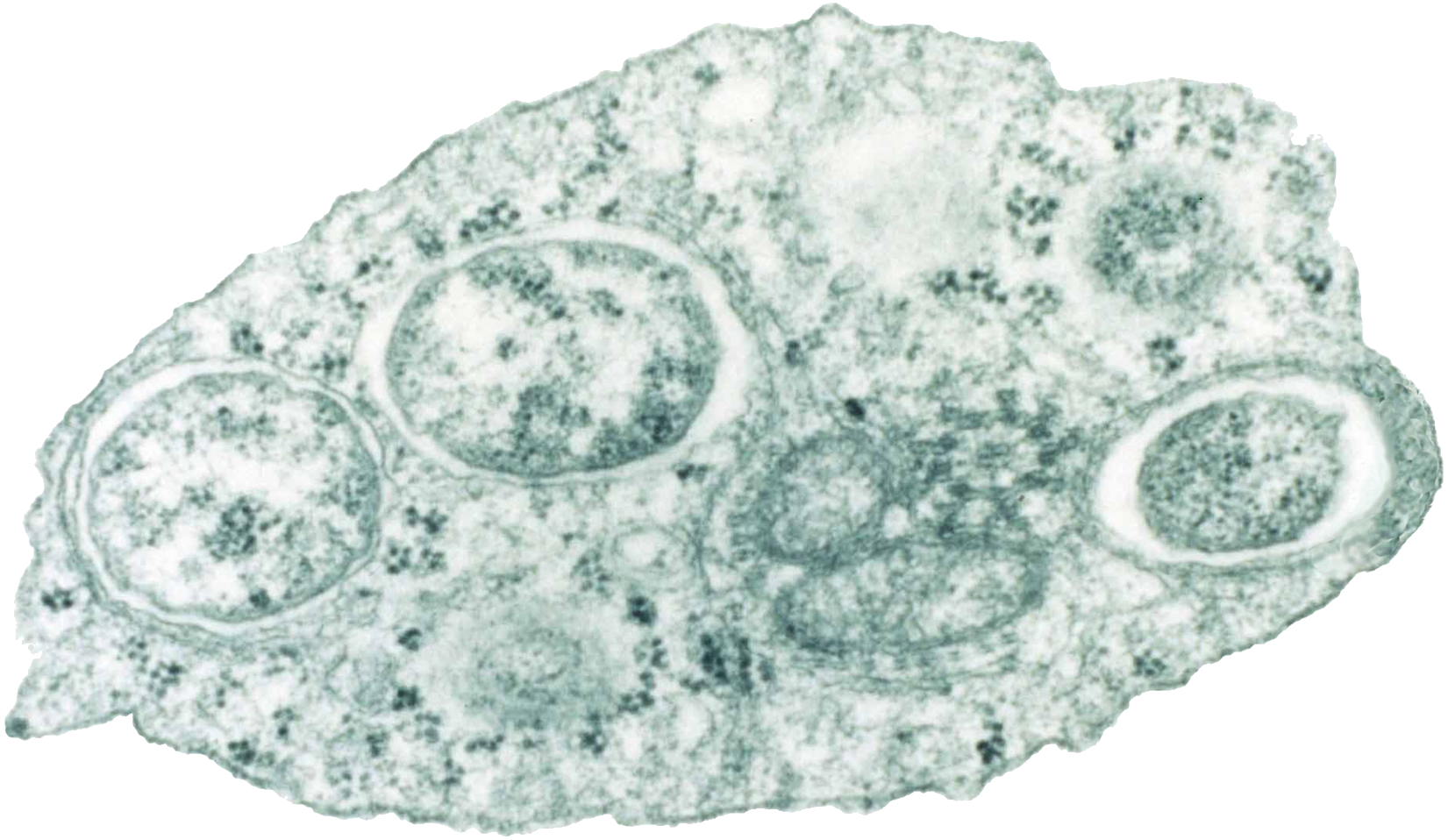
- Transmission electron micrograph of Wolbachia within an insect cell Credit: Public Library of Science / Scott O'Neill

Scientific classification
- Domain: Bacteria
- Kingdom: Pseudomonadati
- Phylum: Pseudomonadota
- Class: Alphaproteobacteria
- Order: Rickettsiales
- Family: Ehrlichiaceae
- Genus: Wolbachia; Hertig 1936 (Approved Lists 1980)

Species
- "Candidatus Wolbachia bourtzisii" Ramirez-Puebla et al. 2015; "Candidatus Wolbachia brugii" Ramirez-Puebla et al. 2015; "Candidatus Wolbachia collembolicola" Ramirez-Puebla et al. 2015; "Candidatus Wolbachia ivorensis" Ehounoud et al. 2016; Wolbachia melophagi (Nöller 1917) Philip 1956 (Approved Lists 1980); "Candidatus Wolbachia multihospitum" Ramirez-Puebla et al. 2015; "Candidatus Wolbachia onchocercicola" Ramirez-Puebla et al. 2015; Wolbachia pipientis Hertig 1936 (Approved Lists 1980)

= Wolbachia =

Genus of bacteria in the Alphaproteobacteria class

Wolbachia is a genus of gram-negative bacteria infecting many species of arthropods and filarial nematodes. The relationship between Wolbachia and its hosts ranges from parasitism through benign symbiosis up to obligate mutualism. It is one of the most common parasitic microbes of arthropods, and is possibly the most widespread reproductive parasite bacterium in the biosphere. Its interactions with hosts are complex and highly diverse across the various species in which it is found. Some host species cannot reproduce, or even survive, absent internal Wolbachia colonies. One study concluded that more than 16% of neotropical insect species carry bacteria of this genus, and as many as 25–70% of all insect species are estimated to be potential hosts.

== History ==
The first organism classified as Wolbachia was discovered in 1924 by Marshall Hertig and Simeon Burt Wolbach in the common house mosquito. They described it as "a somewhat pleomorphic, rodlike, gram-negative, intracellular organism [that] apparently infects only the ovaries and testes". Hertig formally described the species in 1936, and proposed both the generic and specific names: Wolbachia pipientis.

Research on Wolbachia intensified after 1971, when Janice Yen and A. Ralph Barr of UCLA discovered that Culex mosquito eggs were killed by a cytoplasmic incompatibility when the sperm of Wolbachia-infected males fertilized infection-free eggs.

Since, a large number of bacteria with close phylogenetic affinity to the originally detected W. pipientis have been discovered in a variety of hosts spanning over the Arthropoda and Nematoda phyla. The taxonomic classification of the various discovered groups remains a subject of debate, with no consensus on whether these groups of Wolbachia pipientis-like organisms should be categorized as the same or different species. Therefore, the strains are collectively referred to as Wolbachia, with the various groups of phylogenetically closely related strains designated as supergroups rather than distinct species. In general, each supergroup corresponds to a specific host or group of hosts. The genus Wolbachia is of considerable interest today due to its ubiquitous distribution, its many different evolutionary interactions, and its potential use as a biocontrol agent.

Phylogenetic studies have shown that the closest relatives to Wolbachia are the genera Francisella and Bartonella. Unlike Wolbachia, which needs a host cell to multiply, relatives belonging to these genera can be cultured on agar plates.

== Method of sexual differentiation in hosts ==
Wolbachia can infect many different types of organs, but are most notable for the infections of the testes and ovaries of their hosts altering the reproduction abilities of these. Wolbachia species are ubiquitous in mature eggs, but not mature sperm. Only infected females, therefore, pass the infection on to their offspring. Wolbachia bacteria maximize their spread by altering the reproductive capabilities of their hosts in such a way as to favour the infected females. Several different examples of this favoring have been observed, including:

- Male killing, which occurs when infected males die during larval development, which increases the rate of born, infected females.
- Feminization, which results in infected males that develop as females or infertile pseudofemales. This is especially prevalent in Lepidoptera species such as the adzuki bean borer (Ostrinia scapulalis).
- Parthenogenesis, successful reproduction absent fertilization by the relevant male of the species. Some scientists have suggested that parthenogenesis may always be attributable to the effects of Wolbachia, though this is not the case for the marbled crayfish. An example of parthenogenesis induced by presence of Wolbachia are some species within the Trichogramma parasitoid wasp genus, which have evolved to procreate without males due to the presence of Wolbachia. Males are rare in this genus of wasp, possibly because many have been killed by that same strain of Wolbachia.
- Cytoplasmic incompatibility, the inability of Wolbachia-infected males to successfully reproduce with uninfected females or females infected with another Wolbachia strain. This reduces the reproductive success of those uninfected females and therefore promotes the infecting strain. In the cytoplasmic incompatibility mechanism, Wolbachia interferes with the parental chromosomes during the first mitotic divisions to the extent that they can no longer divide in synchrony.

== Effects of sexual differentiation in hosts ==
Several host species, such as those within the genus Trichogramma, are so dependent on sexual differentiation of Wolbachia that they are unable to reproduce effectively without the bacteria in their bodies, and some might even be unable to survive uninfected.

One study on infected woodlice showed the broods of infected organisms had a higher proportion of females than their uninfected counterparts.

Wolbachia, especially Wolbachia-caused cytoplasmic incompatibility, may be important in promoting speciation. Wolbachia strains that distort the sex ratio may alter their host's pattern of sexual selection in nature, and also engender strong selection to prevent their action, leading to some of the fastest examples of natural selection in natural populations.

The male killing and feminization effects of Wolbachia infections can also lead to speciation in their hosts. For example, populations of the pill woodlouse, Armadillidium vulgare which are exposed to the feminizing effects of Wolbachia, have been known to lose their female-determining chromosome. In these cases, only the presence of Wolbachia can cause an individual to develop into a female. Cryptic species of ground wētā (Hemiandrus maculifrons complex) are host to different lineages of Wolbachia which might explain their speciation without ecological or geographical separation.

=== Effect on aromatase ===
The enzyme aromatase is found to mediate sex-change in many species of fish. Wolbachia can affect the activity of aromatase in developing fish embryos.

== Mechanism of host transfer ==
=== Step 1: Physical transfer ===
==== Predator-prey interactions ====
Wolbachia may transfer from prey to predator through the digestive system. To do so, Wolbachia needs to first survive through the lumen secretion and then enter the host tissue through the gut epithelium. This route does not seem to occur frequently due to little evidence.

==== Host–parasitoid/parasite interactions ====
This may be one of the most common routes of Wolbachia host shifts. Compared to predator-prey interactions, the physical association between the host and parasites typically lasts longer, occurs at various developmental stages, and enables Wolbachia to directly contact various tissues.

Since this interaction may expose both sides to microbial exchange, one strategy for understanding the direction of transfer is to assess Wolbachia's presence in close relatives on both sides, as the donor side generally has a larger diversity of infection.

One parasitoid species can infect multiple shared hosts, and one host species can infect multiple parasitoids. For instance, parthenogenesis-inducing Wolbachia can spread between Trichogramma parasitoid wasps sharing host eggs.

Parasites can also serve as a vector between infected and uninfected hosts without being infected. When the mouthparts and ovipositors of aphelinid parasitoid wasps become contaminated through feeding on Wolbachia-infected Bemisia tabaci, it can infect the next host.

==== Shared plant and other food sources ====
This route applies to microbes that can survive either within or on the surface of the food. Experiments demonstrated that the Wolbachia wAlbB strain can survive extracellularly for up to 7 days, and up to 50 days for some strains in cotton leaf phloem vessels.

Plants are one of the best platforms for this route. By physical contact between arthropod mouthparts and plant tissue, the Wolbachia inhabiting the salivary glands of some insects may be transferred to the plants. As a result, arthropod species feeding on the same plants may share common Wolbachia strains.

Other insect food sources may also mediate Wolbachia horizontal transfer, such as the sharing of dung patches between two Malagasy dung beetle species.

=== Step 2: Survival and proliferation in the new host ===
The pathogen-associated molecular patterns (PAMPs) in the bacteria, such as peptidoglycan, can activate the host's innate immune responses. In response, some Wolbachia strains have a unique functional peptidoglycan amidase (AmiDwol) that cleaves its bacterial cell wall so that it can escape from immune responses. Besides the peptidoglycans, cell-to-cell movements of Wolbachia can also cause oxidative stress to the host and trigger the host's immune response. Therefore, Wolbachia has a triple-layer vacuole that acts as a mechanical shield to protect it from cellular immune responses.

=== Step 3: Vertical transmission ===
Vertical transmission requires Wolbachia to reach germ line cells and maintain in the zygote. Wolbachia may initially occupy somatic stem cells as a stable reservoir and then use the host's vitellogenin transovarial transportation system to enter the oocyte. Once Wolbachia enter the zygote, they need to reach important host tissues without disrupting the embryo's development. This can be achieved using the host cytoskeleton, by bundling Wolbachia protein WD0830 to host actin filaments. They can also increase the division rate of germ-line stem cells to localize and increase their titer. Under natural conditions, successful vertical transmission of Wolbachia is challenging.

=== Step 4: Spread within the host population ===
Invasion of a new population likely stems from specific phenotypic effects, including reproductive manipulations and/or providing direct fitness benefits to their female hosts.

Upon transferring into a new host, Wolbachia may retain its original phenotypic effects, induce a different phenotype, or have no detectable effect. For instance, a strain that induces male killing in the moth Cadra cautella induced cytoplasmic incompatibility in a novel moth host Ephestia kuehniella.

== Fitness advantages by Wolbachia infections ==
Wolbachia infection has been linked to viral resistance in Drosophila melanogaster, Drosophila simulans, and mosquito species. Flies, including mosquitoes, infected with the bacteria are more resistant to positive-sense ssRNA viruses such as Drosophila C virus, norovirus, flock house virus, cricket paralysis virus, chikungunya virus, Zika virus, and West Nile virus.

In the common house mosquito, higher levels of Wolbachia were correlated with more insecticide resistance.

In leafminers of the species Phyllonorycter blancardella, Wolbachia bacteria help their hosts produce green islands on yellowing tree leaves, that is, small areas of leaf remaining fresh, allowing the larvae to continue feeding while growing to their adult forms. Larvae treated with tetracycline, which kills Wolbachia, lose this ability and subsequently only 13% emerge successfully as adult moths.

Muscidifurax uniraptor, a parasitoid wasp, also benefits from hosting Wolbachia bacteria.

In the parasitic filarial nematode species responsible for elephantiasis, such as Brugia malayi and Wuchereria bancrofti, Wolbachia has become an obligate endosymbiont and provides the host with chemicals necessary for its reproduction and survival. Elimination of the Wolbachia symbionts through antibiotic treatment therefore prevents reproduction of the nematode, and eventually results in its premature death.

Some Wolbachia species that infect arthropods also provide some metabolic provisioning to their hosts. In Drosophila melanogaster, Wolbachia is found to mediate iron metabolism under nutritional stress and in Cimex lectularius, the Wolbachia strain cCle helps the host to synthesize B vitamins.

Some Wolbachia strains have increased their prevalence by increasing their hosts' fecundity. Wolbachia strains captured from 1988 in southern California still induce a fecundity deficit, but nowadays the fecundity deficit has been replaced in the wild with a fecundity advantage such that infected Drosophila simulans produces more offspring than the uninfected ones.

== Life-history consequences of Wolbachia infection ==
Wolbachia often manipulates host reproduction and life-history in a way that favours its own propagation. In the Pharaoh ant, Wolbachia infection correlates with increased colony-level production of reproductives (i.e., greater reproductive investment), and earlier onset of reproductive production (i.e., shorter life-cycle). Infected colonies also seem to grow more rapidly. There is substantial evidence that the presence of Wolbachia that induce parthenogenesis have put pressure on species to reproduce primarily or entirely this way.

Additionally, Wolbachia has been seen to decrease the lifespan of Aedes aegypti, carriers of mosquito-borne diseases, decreasing their efficacy of pathogen transmission because older mosquitoes are more likely to have become carriers of one of those diseases. This has been exploited as a method for pest control.

== Genomics ==
The first Wolbachia genome to be determined was that of strain wMel, which infects D. melanogaster fruit flies. This genome was sequenced at The Institute for Genomic Research in a collaboration between Jonathan Eisen and Scott O'Neill. The second Wolbachia genome to be determined was of strain wBm, which infects Brugia malayi nematodes . Since the development and release of high-throughput sequencing technologies in the mid-2000s, the number of published Wolbachia genomes has grown significantly, driven by both the decreased cost of sequencing and the expanding interest in studying this bacterium.

The genetic background to the reproductive parasitism has been extensively studied in different host systems. A key factor for the alteration of host reproduction is the presence of the bacteriophage WO, which harbours the CI inducing genes cifA and cifB, contributing to the phenotypic expression of altered reproductive success observed in infected hosts.

=== Horizontal gene transfer ===
Comparative sequence analyses of bacteriophage WO offer some of the most compelling examples of large-scale horizontal gene transfer between Wolbachia coinfections in the same host. It is the first bacteriophage implicated in frequent lateral transfer between the genomes of bacterial endosymbionts. Gene transfer by bacteriophages could drive significant evolutionary change in the genomes of intracellular bacteria that were previously considered highly stable or prone to loss of genes over time.

Wolbachia also transfers genes to the host. A nearly complete copy of the Wolbachia genome sequence was found within the genome sequence of the fruit fly Drosophila ananassae and large segments were found in seven other Drosophila species.

In an application of DNA barcoding to the identification of species of Protocalliphora flies, several distinct morphospecies had identical cytochrome c oxidase I gene sequences, most likely through horizontal gene transfer (HGT) by Wolbachia species as they jump across host species. As a result, Wolbachia can cause misleading results in molecular cladistical analyses. It is estimated that between 20 and 50 percent of insect species have evidence of HGT from Wolbachia—passing from microbes to animal (i.e. insects).

== Small RNA ==
The small non-coding RNAs WsnRNA-46 and WsnRNA-59 in Wolbachia were detected in Aedes aegypti mosquitoes and Drosophila melanogaster. The small RNAs (sRNAs) may regulate bacterial and host genes. Highly conserved intragenic region sRNA called ncrwmel02 was also identified in Wolbachia pipientis. It is expressed in four different strains in a regulated pattern that differs according to the sex of the host and the tissue localisation. This suggested that the sRNA may play important roles in the biology of Wolbachia.

== Relation to human-related infections ==
=== Role in parasites ===
Outside of insects, Wolbachia infects a variety of isopod species, spiders, mites, and many species of filarial nematodes (a type of parasitic worm), including those causing onchocerciasis (river blindness) and elephantiasis in humans, as well as heartworms in dogs. Not only are these disease-causing filarial worms infected with Wolbachia, but Wolbachia also seems to play an inordinate role in these diseases.

A large part of the pathogenicity of filarial nematodes is due to host immune response toward their Wolbachia. Elimination of Wolbachia from filarial nematodes generally results in either death or sterility of the nematode. Consequently, current strategies for control of filarial nematode diseases include elimination of their symbiotic Wolbachia via the simple doxycycline antibiotic, rather than directly killing the nematode with often more toxic antinematode medications.

=== Disease prevention ===
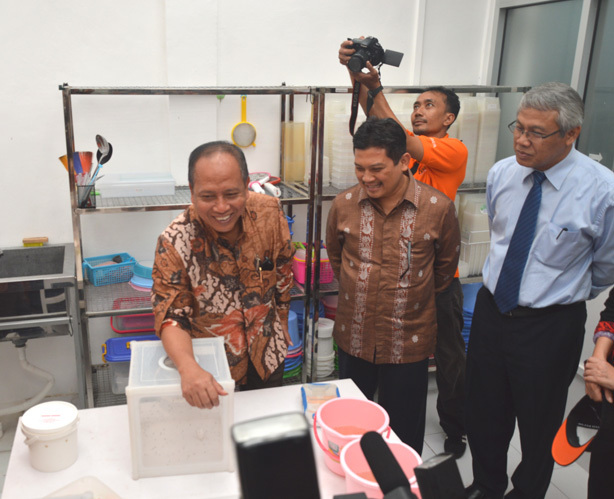
Indonesian research minister Mohamad Nasir during a visit to a Wolbachia mosquito lab of the Eliminate Dengue Project.

Naturally existing strains of Wolbachia have been shown to be a route for vector control strategies because of their presence in arthropod populations, such as mosquitoes. Due to the unique traits of Wolbachia that cause cytoplasmic incompatibility, some strains are useful to humans as a promoter of genetic drive within an insect population. Wolbachia-infected females are able to produce offspring with uninfected and infected males; however, uninfected females are only able to produce viable offspring with uninfected males. This gives infected females a reproductive advantage that is greater the higher the frequency of Wolbachia in the population. Computational models predict that introducing Wolbachia strains into natural populations will reduce pathogen transmission and reduce overall disease burden. An example includes a life-shortening Wolbachia that can be used to control dengue virus and malaria by eliminating the older insects that contain more parasites. Promoting the survival and reproduction of younger insects lessens selection pressure for evolution of resistance.

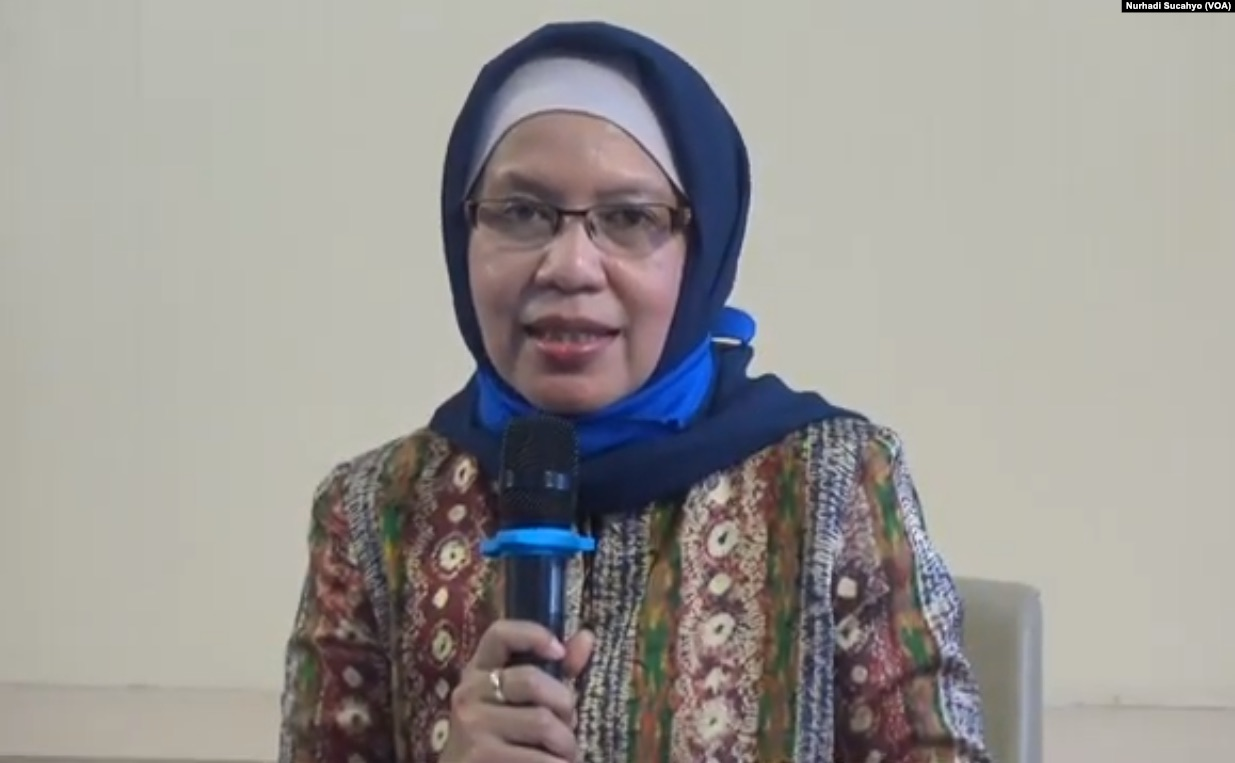
Adi Utarini, research lead of the Wolbachia trial in Yogyakarta, Indonesia

In addition, some Wolbachia strains are able to directly reduce viral replication inside the insect. For dengue, they include wAlbB and wMelPop with Aedes aegypti, and wMel with Aedes albopictus and Aedes aegypti.

Wolbachia has also been identified to inhibit replication of chikungunya virus (CHIKV) in A. aegypti. The wMel strain of Wolbachia pipientis significantly reduced infection and dissemination rates of CHIKV in mosquitoes, compared to Wolbachia uninfected controls and the same phenomenon was observed in yellow fever virus infection converting this bacterium in an excellent promise for YFV and CHIKV suppression.

Wolbachia also inhibits the secretion of West Nile virus (WNV) in cell line Aag2 derived from A. aegypti cells. The mechanism is somewhat novel, as the bacteria actually enhances the production of viral genomic RNA in the cell line Wolbachia. Also, the antiviral effect in intrathoracically infected mosquitoes depends on the strain of Wolbachia, and the replication of the virus in orally fed mosquitoes was completely inhibited in wMelPop strain of Wolbachia.

The effect of Wolbachia infection on virus replication in insect hosts is complex and depends on the Wolbachia strain and virus species. While several studies have indicated consistent refractory phenotypes of Wolbachia infection on positive-sense RNA viruses in Drosophila melanogaster, the yellow fever mosquito Aedes aegypti and the Asian tiger mosquito Aedes albopictus, this effect is not seen in DNA virus infection and in some cases Wolbachia infection has been associated or shown to increase single stranded DNA and double-stranded DNA virus infection. There is also currently no evidence that Wolbachia infection restricts any tested negative-sense RNA viruses indicating Wolbachia would be unsuitable for restriction of negative-sense RNA arthropod borne viruses.

Wolbachia infection can also increase mosquito resistance to malaria, as shown in Anopheles stephensi where the wAlbB strain of Wolbachia hindered the lifecycle of Plasmodium falciparum.

However, Wolbachia infections can also enhance pathogen transmission. Wolbachia has enhanced multiple arboviruses in Culex tarsalis mosquitoes. In another study, West Nile virus (WNV) infection rate was significantly higher in Wolbachia (strain wAlbB)-infected C. tarsalis compared to controls.

Wolbachia may induce reactive oxygen species–dependent activation of the Toll (gene family) pathway, which is essential for activation of antimicrobial peptides, defensins, and cecropins that help to inhibit virus proliferation. Conversely, certain strains actually dampen the pathway, leading to higher replication of viruses. One example is with strain wAlbB in Culex tarsalis, where infected mosquitoes actually carried the West Nile virus (WNV) more frequently. This is because wAlbB inhibits REL1, an activator of the antiviral Toll immune pathway. As a result, careful studies of the Wolbachia strain and ecological consequences must be done before releasing artificially-infected mosquitoes in the environment.

==== Techniques and deployments ====
===== Strain wMel, mixed-sex =====
The World Mosquito Program (WMP) uses Wolbachia strain wMel to infect Aedes mosquitos. The mixed-sex mosquitos are intended to infect the local population with wMel, giving them transmission resistance.

In 2014, WMP released infected mosquitos in Townsville, an Australia city with 187,000 inhabitants plagued by dengue. For four years after introduction, no cases of dengue were reported. Trials in much smaller areas had been carried out, but a larger area had not been tested. No environmental ill-effects were reported. The cost was A$15 per inhabitant, but it was hoped that it could be reduced to US$1 in poorer countries with lower labor costs.

In 2016, WMP scientist Scott Ritchie proposed using wMel mosquitos to combat the spread of the Zika virus. A study reported that Wolbachia wMel has the ability to block Zika in Brazil. In October 2016, it was announced that US$18 million in funding was being allocated for the use of Wolbachia-infected mosquitoes to fight Zika and dengue viruses. Deployment was slated for early 2017 in Colombia and Brazil.

Between 2016 and 2020, WMP conducted its first randomized controlled trial in Yogyakarta, an Indonesian city of about 400,000 inhabitants. In August 2020, the trial's Indonesian lead scientist Adi Utarini announced that the trial showed a 77% reduction in dengue cases compared to the control areas. This trial was the "strongest evidence yet" for the technique.

In 2017–2019, WMP released mosquitos in Niterói, Brazil.

In March 2023, Brazil's Oswaldo Cruz Foundation signed an agreement with WMP to provide funds for a large "mosquito factory" producing infected insects.

===== Male incompatibility =====
Another method to use Wolbachia in mosquitos exploits the cytoplasmic incompatibility between infected males and uninfected females. If an uninfected female mates with an infected male, her eggs become infertile. With enough infected males released, the mosquito population would be reduced temporarily.

Verily, the life sciences arm of Google's parent company Alphabet Inc., uses this method. In July 2017, it announced a plan to release about 20 million Wolbachia-infected male Aedes aegypti mosquitoes in Fresno, California, in an attempt to combat the Zika virus. Singapore's National Environment Agency has teamed up with Verily to come up with an advanced, more efficient way to release male Wolbachia mosquitoes for Phase 2 of its study to suppress the urban Aedes aegypti mosquito population and fight dengue.

On November 3, 2017, the US Environmental Protection Agency (EPA) registered Mosquito Mate, Inc. to release Wolbachia strain "ZAP"-infected male mosquitoes in 20 US states and the District of Columbia.

== See also ==
- Intragenomic conflict
- Quorum sensing
- Delftia tsuruhatensis a bacterium that naturally prevent malaria.
- Serratia a genus of bacteria that can be genetically modified to prevent malaria.
