= List of Pteromalus species =

This is a list of 432 species in Pteromalus, a genus of pteromalid wasps in the family Pteromalidae.

== Pteromalus species ==
- Pteromalus aartseni (Gijswijt, 1972)^{c g}
- Pteromalus abdominalis Statz, 1938^{c g}
- Pteromalus aberrans Forster, 1841^{g}
- Pteromalus abieticola Ratzeburg, 1848^{c g}
- Pteromalus achillei Janzon, 1984^{c g}
- Pteromalus acicularis Forster, 1841^{g}
- Pteromalus actinopterae (Hedqvist, 1977)^{c g}
- Pteromalus acuminatus Forster, 1841^{g}
- Pteromalus aeneus Fonscolombe, 1832^{c g}
- Pteromalus aerosus Statz, 1938^{c g}
- Pteromalus aeson Walker, 1848^{c g}
- Pteromalus agilis Forster, 1841^{g}
- Pteromalus albescens Ratzeburg, 1844^{c g}
- Pteromalus albidovenosus Walker, 1874^{c g}
- Pteromalus albipennis Walker, 1835^{c g}
- Pteromalus albitarsis De Stefani, 1907^{c g}
- Pteromalus almeriensis Gijswijt, 1999^{c g}
- Pteromalus alternans Forster, 1841^{g}
- Pteromalus alternipes Walker, 1872^{c g}
- Pteromalus altus (Walker, 1834)^{c g}
- Pteromalus amabilis Walker, 1836^{c g}
- Pteromalus amage (Walker, 1849)^{c g}
- Pteromalus ambiguus Forster, 1841^{g}
- Pteromalus amerinae Swederus, 1795^{c g}
- Pteromalus ametrus Graham, 1981^{g}
- Pteromalus amyntor Walker, 1846^{c g}
- Pteromalus anaxis Walker, 1849^{c g}
- Pteromalus angustus Forster, 1841^{g}
- Pteromalus annae Janzon, 1984^{c g}
- Pteromalus anomalipes Forster, 1841^{g}
- Pteromalus antheraecola Amerling & Kirchner, 1860^{c g}
- Pteromalus apantelesi Risbec, 1952^{c g}
- Pteromalus apantelophagus (Crawford, 1910)^{c g}
- Pteromalus apicalis Nees, 1834^{c g}
- Pteromalus apionis (Goureau, 1847)^{c g}
- Pteromalus apum (Retzius, 1783)^{c g}
- Pteromalus arborivagus Forster, 1841^{g}
- Pteromalus archia Walker, 1843^{c g}
- Pteromalus arnicae Janzon, 1984^{c g}
- Pteromalus atomos Fonscolombe, 1832^{c g}
- Pteromalus atomus Statz, 1938^{c g}
- Pteromalus atra Statz, 1938^{c g}
- Pteromalus atramentarius Forster, 1841^{g}
- Pteromalus aurantiacus Ratzeburg, 1852^{c g}
- Pteromalus auratus Swederus, 1795^{c g}
- Pteromalus aureolus (Thomson, 1878)^{c g}
- Pteromalus aurifacies Forster, 1841^{g}
- Pteromalus aurinitens Forster, 1841^{g}
- Pteromalus barycerus Forster, 1841^{g}
- Pteromalus baton Walker, 1839^{c g}
- Pteromalus bedeguaris (Thomson, 1878)^{c g}
- Pteromalus bekiliensis Risbec, 1952^{c g}
- Pteromalus berylli Walker, 1835^{c g}
- Pteromalus bienna Walker, 1848^{c g}
- Pteromalus bifoveolatus Förster, 1861^{g}
- Pteromalus blandus Forster, 1841^{g}
- Pteromalus bottnicus Vikberg, 1979^{c g}
- Pteromalus brachygaster (Graham, 1969)^{c g}
- Pteromalus breviscapus Forster, 1841^{g}
- Pteromalus brunnicans Ratzeburg, 1848^{c g}
- Pteromalus bryce Walker, 1842^{c g}
- Pteromalus calenus Walker, 1843^{c g}
- Pteromalus canariensis (Janzon, 1977)^{c g}
- Pteromalus capreae (Linnaeus, 1761)^{c g}
- Pteromalus cardui (Erdos, 1953)^{g}
- Pteromalus carinatus Forster, 1841^{g}
- Pteromalus cassotis Walker, 1847^{c g b}
- Pteromalus caudiger (Graham, 1969)^{c g}
- Pteromalus cerealellae (Ashmead, 1902)^{c g}
- Pteromalus cerinopus Forster, 1841^{g}
- Pteromalus chalybaeus Nees, 1834^{c g}
- Pteromalus chlorogaster (Thomson, 1878)^{c g}
- Pteromalus chlorospilus (Walker, 1834)^{c g}
- Pteromalus chrysis Forster, 1841^{g}
- Pteromalus chrysos Walker, 1836^{c g}
- Pteromalus ciliatus Walker, 1795^{c g}
- Pteromalus cioni (Thomson, 1878)^{c g}
- Pteromalus cionobius (Erdos, 1953)^{g}
- Pteromalus clavicornis Swederus, 1795^{c g}
- Pteromalus clavipes Forster, 1841^{g}
- Pteromalus cleophanes Walker, 1839^{c g}
- Pteromalus coeruleiventris (Ashmead, 1888)^{c g}
- Pteromalus coerulescens Ratzeburg, 1852^{c g}
- Pteromalus coeruleus Forster, 1841^{g}
- Pteromalus coloradensis (Ashmead, 1890)^{c g}
- Pteromalus colosseus Forster, 1841^{g}
- Pteromalus compactus Forster, 1841^{g}
- Pteromalus compos Forster, 1841^{g}
- Pteromalus concinnus Forster, 1841^{g}
- Pteromalus conformis (Graham, 1969)^{c g}
- Pteromalus conoideus Ratzeburg, 1848^{c g}
- Pteromalus conopidarum (Boucek, 1961)^{c g}
- Pteromalus cosis Walker, 1839^{c g}
- Pteromalus costulata Gijswijt, 1999^{c g}
- Pteromalus couridae Cameron, 1913^{c g}
- Pteromalus crassicapitatus Statz, 1938^{c g}
- Pteromalus crassicornis Zetterstedt, 1838^{c g}
- Pteromalus crassinervis (Thomson, 1878)^{c g}
- Pteromalus crassus Forster, 1841^{g}
- Pteromalus cryptocephali Ratzeburg, 1852^{c g}
- Pteromalus cubocephalus Forster, 1841^{g}
- Pteromalus cupreus Nees, 1834^{c g}
- Pteromalus curculionoides (Bouché, 1834)^{g}
- Pteromalus cylindraceus Forster, 1841^{g}
- Pteromalus cyniphidis (Linnaeus, 1758)^{g}
- Pteromalus dahlbomi Ratzeburg, 1844^{c g}
- Pteromalus dalmanni Forster, 1841^{g}
- Pteromalus damo Walker, 1847^{c g}
- Pteromalus decipiens (Graham, 1969)^{c}
- Pteromalus defossus Statz, 1938^{c g}
- Pteromalus delvarei Vago, 2002^{c g}
- Pteromalus dendrolimi Matsumura, 1926^{c g}
- Pteromalus depressus Forster, 1841^{g}
- Pteromalus devorator Forster, 1841^{g}
- Pteromalus diadema Ratzeburg, 1852^{c g}
- Pteromalus diatatus Schmidt, 1851^{c g}
- Pteromalus difficilis Forster, 1841^{g}
- Pteromalus dimiduis Dalla Torre, 1898^{c g}
- Pteromalus diminuator Forster, 1841^{g}
- Pteromalus dirutor Forster, 1841^{g}
- Pteromalus discors Graham, 1992^{c g}
- Pteromalus discrepans Forster, 1861^{g}
- Pteromalus dispar (Curtis, 1827)^{c g}
- Pteromalus divitissimus Dalla Torre, 1898^{c g}
- Pteromalus dolichurus (Thomson, 1878)^{c g}
- Pteromalus doryssus Walker, 1847^{c g}
- Pteromalus doumeti Fairmaire, 1879^{c g}
- Pteromalus driopides Walker, 1839^{c g}
- Pteromalus ecarinatus Forster, 1841^{g}
- Pteromalus egregius Forster, 1841^{g}
- Pteromalus elatus Forster, 1841^{g}
- Pteromalus elevatus (Walker, 1834)^{c g}
- Pteromalus ellisorum Gijswijt, 1984^{c g}
- Pteromalus elongatus Ratzeburg, 1852^{c g}
- Pteromalus elpinice Walker, 1839^{c g}
- Pteromalus eminens Forster, 1841^{g}
- Pteromalus epicles Walker, 1847^{c g}
- Pteromalus epimelas Walker, 1836^{c g}
- Pteromalus esuriens Forster, 1841^{g}
- Pteromalus eurymi Gahan, 1913^{c g}
- Pteromalus euthymus Walker, 1847^{c g}
- Pteromalus euurae Askew, 1995^{c g}
- Pteromalus exanimis Brues, 1910^{c g}
- Pteromalus exiguus Forster, 1841^{g}
- Pteromalus exoletus Forster, 1841^{g}
- Pteromalus exsertus Forster, 1841^{g}
- Pteromalus extensus Forster, 1841^{g}
- Pteromalus fabia Walker, 1839^{c g}
- Pteromalus facilis Forster, 1841^{g}
- Pteromalus fagi Ratzeburg, 1852^{c g}
- Pteromalus fasciatus (Thomson, 1878)^{c}
- Pteromalus faunigena Forster, 1841^{g}
- Pteromalus felginas Walker, 1842^{c g}
- Pteromalus fenomenalis (Domenichini, 1958)^{g}
- Pteromalus ferox Forster, 1841^{g}
- Pteromalus fervidus Forster, 1841^{g}
- Pteromalus festivus Forster, 1841^{g}
- Pteromalus flavicornis (Girault & Dodd, 1915)^{c g}
- Pteromalus flavipalpis Ratzeburg, 1844^{c g}
- Pteromalus flaviscapus Rudow, 1886^{c g}
- Pteromalus flaviventris Rudow, 1886^{c g}
- Pteromalus foersteri Dalla Torre, 1898^{g}
- Pteromalus fugax Forster, 1841^{g}
- Pteromalus furtivus Forster, 1841^{g}
- Pteromalus fuscipennis (Walker, 1834)^{c g}
- Pteromalus fuscipes (Provancher, 1881)^{c g}
- Pteromalus fuscitarsis Ashmead, 1901^{c g}
- Pteromalus fuscopalpus Forster, 1841^{g}
- Pteromalus gallicolus Doganlar, 1980^{c g}
- Pteromalus garibaldius (Girault, 1938)^{c g}
- Pteromalus genuinus Forster, 1841^{g}
- Pteromalus glabriculus (Thomson, 1878)^{c g}
- Pteromalus gnavis Forster, 1841^{g}
- Pteromalus gracillimus Dalla Torre, 1898^{c g}
- Pteromalus gratiosus Forster, 1841^{g}
- Pteromalus grisselli ^{g}
- Pteromalus gryneus Walker, 1842^{c g}
- Pteromalus guttula Ratzeburg, 1852^{c g}
- Pteromalus habilis Forster, 1841^{g}
- Pteromalus hedymeles Walker, 1839^{c g}
- Pteromalus helenomus (Graham, 1969)^{c g}
- Pteromalus hemileucae Gahan, 1917^{c g}
- Pteromalus herbaceus Forster, 1841^{g}
- Pteromalus hercyniae Ratzeburg, 1844^{c g}
- Pteromalus hesus Walker, 1839^{c g}
- Pteromalus hieracii (Thomson, 1878)^{c g}
- Pteromalus hirtipes Statz, 1938^{c g}
- Pteromalus holmgrenii Dalla Torre, 1898^{c g}
- Pteromalus honestus Forster, 1841^{g}
- Pteromalus hunteri (Crawford, 1908)^{c g}
- Pteromalus hyalopterus Dalla Torre, 1898^{c g}
- Pteromalus hypocyaneus Forster, 1841^{g}
- Pteromalus hyponomeutae (Masi, 1909)^{g}
- Pteromalus ignobilis Forster, 1861^{g}
- Pteromalus illustratus Forster, 1841^{g}
- Pteromalus immundus Forster, 1841^{g}
- Pteromalus impeditus Walker, 1835^{c g}
- Pteromalus impressifrons Forster, 1841^{g}
- Pteromalus inanis Forster, 1841^{g}
- Pteromalus incertus Forster, 1841^{g}
- Pteromalus inclytus Forster, 1841^{g}
- Pteromalus inconspicuus Forster, 1841^{g}
- Pteromalus inermis Forster, 1841^{g}
- Pteromalus infelix Dalla Torre, 1898^{c g}
- Pteromalus infestus Forster, 1841^{g}
- Pteromalus infinitus Forster, 1841^{g}
- Pteromalus inquilinus Forster, 1841^{g}
- Pteromalus insignis Forster, 1841^{g}
- Pteromalus integer Walker, 1872^{c g}
- Pteromalus intermedius (Walker, 1834)^{c g}
- Pteromalus ipsea Walker, 1839^{c g}
- Pteromalus isarchus Walker, 1839^{c g}
- Pteromalus ivondroi Risbec, 1952^{c g}
- Pteromalus janssoni (Graham, 1969)^{c g}
- Pteromalus jejunus Forster, 1841^{g}
- Pteromalus keralensis Sureshan, 2001^{c g}
- Pteromalus kuwayamae Matsumura, 1926^{c g}
- Pteromalus lactucae (Szelenyi & Erdos, 1953)^{g}
- Pteromalus laetus Forster, 1841^{g}
- Pteromalus laevis Forster, 1841^{g}
- Pteromalus laricinellae Ratzeburg, 1848^{c g}
- Pteromalus larymna Walker, 1848^{c g}
- Pteromalus larzacensis Graham, 1984^{c g}
- Pteromalus latipennatus Statz, 1938^{c g}
- Pteromalus latreillei Ratzeburg, 1848^{c g}
- Pteromalus lazulinus Forster, 1841^{g}
- Pteromalus lepidotus Ratzeburg, 1852^{c g}
- Pteromalus leptogaster Forster, 1841^{g}
- Pteromalus leptostictus Forster, 1841^{g}
- Pteromalus leucanthemi Janzon, 1980^{c g}
- Pteromalus limbatus Forster, 1841^{g}
- Pteromalus lineolatus Dalla Torre, 1898^{c g}
- Pteromalus lixi (Sarra, 1924)^{g}
- Pteromalus longicornis Statz, 1938^{c g}
- Pteromalus lugens Forster, 1841^{g}
- Pteromalus lutulentus Dalla Torre, 1898^{c g}
- Pteromalus luzonensis Gahan, 1925^{c g}
- Pteromalus macrocerus Dalla Torre, 1898^{c g}
- Pteromalus macronychivorus Perez, 1864^{c g}
- Pteromalus maculiscapus Ratzeburg, 1844^{c g}
- Pteromalus mandibulatus Dalla Torre, 1898^{c g}
- Pteromalus marellii De Santis, 1998^{c g}
- Pteromalus mariae Dalla Torre, 1898^{c g}
- Pteromalus matsuyadorii Matsumura, 1926^{c g}
- Pteromalus maurus Forster, 1841^{g}
- Pteromalus mediocris Walker, 1835^{c g}
- Pteromalus megareus Walker, 1842^{c g}
- Pteromalus melancholicus Forster, 1841^{g}
- Pteromalus melanocerus Forster, 1841^{g}
- Pteromalus melanochlorus Forster, 1841^{g}
- Pteromalus meridionalis Risbec, 1952^{c g}
- Pteromalus metallicus Sureshan, 2001^{c g}
- Pteromalus metallifemur (Bukovskii, 1938)^{g}
- Pteromalus microgastris (Kurdjumov, 1912)^{g}
- Pteromalus microneurus Ratzeburg, 1844^{c g}
- Pteromalus microps (Graham, 1969)^{c g}
- Pteromalus micros Dalla Torre, 1898^{c g}
- Pteromalus mixtus Forster, 1841^{g}
- Pteromalus mobilis Forster, 1841^{g}
- Pteromalus molestus Forster, 1841^{g}
- Pteromalus monochrous Forster, 1841^{g}
- Pteromalus moravicus Graham, 1984^{c g}
- Pteromalus musaeus Walker, 1844^{c g}
- Pteromalus mutia Walker, 1839^{c g}
- Pteromalus mydon Walker, 1839^{c g}
- Pteromalus myopitae (Graham, 1969)^{c g}
- Pteromalus myopites De Stefani Perez, 1901^{c g}
- Pteromalus nanulus Dalla Torre, 1898^{c g}
- Pteromalus napaeus Forster, 1841^{g}
- Pteromalus naucus Forster, 1841^{g}
- Pteromalus navis Ratzeburg, 1848^{c g}
- Pteromalus nebulosus Dalla Torre, 1898^{c g}
- Pteromalus neesii Ratzeburg, 1844^{c g}
- Pteromalus neglectus Forster, 1841^{g}
- Pteromalus niger (Fonscolombe, 1832)^{c g}
- Pteromalus nigricans Forster, 1841^{g}
- Pteromalus nigrus Sureshan, 2001^{c g}
- Pteromalus niphe Walker, 1839^{c g}
- Pteromalus nodulosus Ratzeburg, 1848^{c g}
- Pteromalus nuperus Forster, 1841^{g}
- Pteromalus obductus Forster, 1841^{g}
- Pteromalus obscurus Nees, 1834^{c}
- Pteromalus obvolitans Forster, 1841^{g}
- Pteromalus ochrocerus (Thomson, 1878)^{c g}
- Pteromalus oenoe Walker, 1843^{c g}
- Pteromalus onerati Fitch, 1859^{c g}
- Pteromalus opacus Forster, 1841^{g}
- Pteromalus opimus Forster, 1841^{g}
- Pteromalus ormenus Walker, 1839^{c g}
- Pteromalus ornatus Forster, 1841^{g}
- Pteromalus ortalus Walker, 1839^{c g}
- Pteromalus osmiae Hedqvist, 1979^{c g}
- Pteromalus oxynthes Walker, 1843^{c g}
- Pteromalus pachygaster Forster, 1841^{g}
- Pteromalus pachymerus Forster, 1841^{g}
- Pteromalus pallipes (Spinola, 1808)^{c g}
- Pteromalus paludicola Boucek, 1972^{c g}
- Pteromalus papaveris Forster, 1841^{g}
- Pteromalus parietinae (Graham, 1969)^{c g}
- Pteromalus patro Walker, 1848^{c g}
- Pteromalus pellucidiventris Ratzeburg, 1848^{c g}
- Pteromalus pellucidus Forster, 1841^{g}
- Pteromalus phycidis (Ashmead, 1898)^{c g}
- Pteromalus picinus Forster, 1841^{g}
- Pteromalus pilosellae Janzon, 1984^{c g}
- Pteromalus pilosellus Forster, 1841^{g}
- Pteromalus planiusculus Forster, 1841^{g}
- Pteromalus platyphilus Walker, 1874^{c g}
- Pteromalus pogonochoeri Ratzeburg, 1844^{c g}
- Pteromalus poisoensis Graham, 1983^{c g}
- Pteromalus polychlori Ratzeburg, 1852^{c g}
- Pteromalus polycyclus Forster, 1841^{g}
- Pteromalus pomacearum Ratzeburg, 1852^{c g}
- Pteromalus pontaniae Askew, 1985^{c g}
- Pteromalus praeceps Forster, 1841^{g}
- Pteromalus praecocellae (Boucek, 1967)^{c g}
- Pteromalus praelongus Forster, 1841^{g}
- Pteromalus praepes Forster, 1841^{g}
- Pteromalus praepotens Forster, 1841^{g}
- Pteromalus princeps Forster, 1841^{g}
- Pteromalus procerus Graham, 1969^{c g}
- Pteromalus propinquus Forster, 1841^{g}
- Pteromalus proprius Walker, 1874^{c g}
- Pteromalus provincialis Graham, 1984^{g}
- Pteromalus psyllus Forster, 1841^{g}
- Pteromalus pulchellus Statz, 1938^{c g}
- Pteromalus pullus Forster, 1841^{g}
- Pteromalus punctum Forster, 1841^{g}
- Pteromalus pungens Forster, 1841^{g}
- Pteromalus puparum (Linnaeus, 1758)^{c g}
- Pteromalus purpureiventris (Ashmead, 1888)^{c g}
- Pteromalus pygmaeanae Ratzeburg, 1844^{c g}
- Pteromalus pygmaeolus Statz, 1938^{c g}
- Pteromalus pygmaeus Forster, 1841^{g}
- Pteromalus qinghaiensis Liao, 1987^{c g}
- Pteromalus questionis Forster, 1841^{g}
- Pteromalus racemosi Ratzeburg, 1848^{c g}
- Pteromalus ramulorum Ratzeburg, 1848^{c g}
- Pteromalus rapax Forster, 1841^{g}
- Pteromalus ratzeburgii Dalla Torre, 1898^{c g}
- Pteromalus rectispinus Statz, 1938^{c g}
- Pteromalus regius Forster, 1841^{g}
- Pteromalus relevatus Forster, 1841^{g}
- Pteromalus rhinthon Walker, 1844^{c g}
- Pteromalus rhoebus Walker, 1843^{c g}
- Pteromalus rhombicus Forster, 1841^{g}
- Pteromalus ridens Vago, 2002^{c g}
- Pteromalus rondanii Dalla Torre, 1898^{c g}
- Pteromalus rottensis Statz, 1938^{c g}
- Pteromalus rudowii Dalla Torre, 1898^{c g}
- Pteromalus ruficornis Rudow, 1886^{c g}
- Pteromalus saltatorius Forster, 1841^{g}
- Pteromalus sapphireus Forster, 1841^{g}
- Pteromalus scandiae (Graham, 1969)^{c g}
- Pteromalus semotus (Walker, 1834)^{c g}
- Pteromalus senegalensis Risbec, 1951^{c g}
- Pteromalus sequester Walker, 1835^{c g}
- Pteromalus serratae Graham, 1984^{c g}
- Pteromalus sestius Walker, 1843^{c g}
- Pteromalus shanxiensis Huang, 1987^{c g}
- Pteromalus similis Forster, 1841^{g}
- Pteromalus simplex Forster, 1841^{g}
- Pteromalus sincerus Forster, 1841^{g}
- Pteromalus singularis Forster, 1841^{g}
- Pteromalus smaragdinus Forster, 1841^{g}
- Pteromalus smaragdus Graham, 1969^{c g}
- Pteromalus solidaginis Graham & Gijswijt, 1991^{c g}
- Pteromalus solidus Forster, 1841^{g}
- Pteromalus sonchi Janzon, 1983^{c g}
- Pteromalus sophax Walker, 1839^{c g}
- Pteromalus sparsus Forster, 1841^{g}
- Pteromalus speculifer Graham, 1981^{c g}
- Pteromalus sphaerogaster Forster, 1841^{g}
- Pteromalus sphegigaster De Stefani, 1886^{c g}
- Pteromalus spilocerus Dalla Torre, 1898^{c g}
- Pteromalus splendidus Forster, 1841^{g}
- Pteromalus spoliator Forster, 1861^{g}
- Pteromalus squamifer Thomson, 1878^{c g}
- Pteromalus strobilobius Ratzeburg, 1852^{c g}
- Pteromalus subaequalis Forster, 1841^{g}
- Pteromalus sublaevis Forster, 1841^{g}
- Pteromalus subpunctatus Forster, 1841^{g}
- Pteromalus subterraneus Forster, 1841^{g}
- Pteromalus suia Walker, 1848^{c g}
- Pteromalus sulphuripes Forster, 1841^{g}
- Pteromalus sybarita Forster, 1841^{g}
- Pteromalus sylvarum Forster, 1841^{g}
- Pteromalus sylveni Hedqvist, 1979^{c g}
- Pteromalus syntomus Ratzeburg, 1852^{c g}
- Pteromalus syrphi Dalman, 1820^{c g}
- Pteromalus tananarivensis Risbec, 1952^{c g}
- Pteromalus temporalis (Graham, 1969)^{c g}
- Pteromalus terebrans Forster, 1841^{g}
- Pteromalus tereus Walker, 1839^{c g}
- Pteromalus tessellatus Ratzeburg, 1852^{c g}
- Pteromalus tethys Gijswijt, 1999^{c g}
- Pteromalus tibialis Nees, 1834^{c g}
- Pteromalus tibiellus Zetterstedt, 1838^{c g}
- Pteromalus tiburtus Walker, 1839^{c g}
- Pteromalus timidus Dalla Torre, 1898^{c g}
- Pteromalus tortricis (Schrank, 1781)^{c g}
- Pteromalus townsendi (Crawford, 1912)^{c g}
- Pteromalus toxeus Walker, 1843^{c g}
- Pteromalus tricollis Forster, 1841^{g}
- Pteromalus tripolii (Graham, 1969)^{c g}
- Pteromalus troglodytes Dalla Torre, 1898^{c g}
- Pteromalus unca Walker, 1839^{c g}
- Pteromalus unicolor Forster, 1841^{g}
- Pteromalus vaginatus Forster, 1841^{g}
- Pteromalus vaginulae Ratzeburg, 1852^{c g}
- Pteromalus vallatus Forster, 1841^{g}
- Pteromalus vallecula Ratzeburg, 1848^{c g}
- Pteromalus vanessae Howard, 1889^{c g}
- Pteromalus varians (Spinola, 1808)^{c g}
- Pteromalus variolosus Forster, 1841^{g}
- Pteromalus vectensis Cockerell, 1921^{c g}
- Pteromalus velox Forster, 1841^{g}
- Pteromalus veneris Dalla Torre, 1898^{c g}
- Pteromalus ventricosus Forster, 1841^{g}
- Pteromalus venustus Statz, 1938^{c g}
- Pteromalus verticalis Forster, 1841^{g}
- Pteromalus vibulenus (Walker, 1839)^{c g}
- Pteromalus vicarius Ratzeburg, 1852^{c g}
- Pteromalus vicinus Forster, 1841^{g}
- Pteromalus villosae Gijswijt, 1999^{c g}
- Pteromalus violarum Dalla Torre, 1898^{c g}
- Pteromalus viridicans Forster, 1841^{g}
- Pteromalus vitula Walker, 1843^{c g}
- Pteromalus vopiscus Walker, 1839^{c g}
- Pteromalus vorax Forster, 1841^{g}
- Pteromalus vulgaris (Ashmead, 1894)^{c g}
- Pteromalus vulso Walker, 1839^{c g}

Data sources: i = ITIS, c = Catalogue of Life, g = GBIF, b = Bugguide.net
