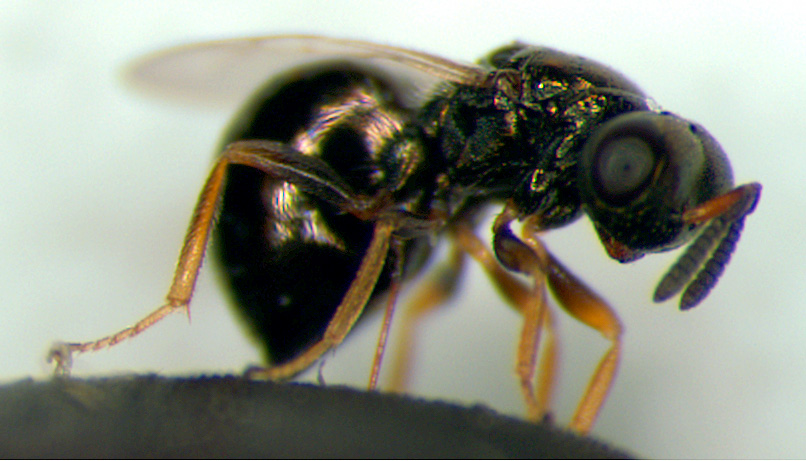
- Nasonia vitripennis

Scientific classification
- Domain: Eukaryota
- Kingdom: Animalia
- Phylum: Arthropoda
- Class: Insecta
- Order: Hymenoptera
- Family: Pteromalidae
- Subfamily: Pteromalinae

Genera
- See text

= Pteromalinae =

Subfamily of wasps

Pteromalinae is a parasitoid wasp subfamily in the family Pteromalidae.

== Genera ==
- Otitesellini: Adiyodiella, Apocrypta, Arachonia, Bouceka, Comptoniella, Crossogaster, Diaziella, Dobunabaa, Eujacobsonia, Grandiana, Grasseiana, Guadalia, Lipothymus, Marginalia, Micranisa, Micrognathophora, Otitesella, Philosycella, Philosycus, Philoverdance, Philotrypesis, Robertsia, Seres, Sycoecus, Sycoryctes, Sycoscapter, Walkerella, Watshamiella
- Pteromalini: Ablaxia, Abomalus, Acaenacis, Acroclisella, Acroclisissa, Acroclypa, Acrocormus, Aepocerus, Afropsilocera, Aggelma, Agiommatus, Aiemea, Allocricellius, Alticornis, Amandia, Amblypachus, Amphidocius, Angulifrons, Anisopteromalus, Ankaratrella, Anogmoides, Anogmus, Anorbanus, Apelioma, Apsilocera, Apycnetron, Arachnopteromalus, Arriva, Arthrolytus, Asoka, Atrichomalus, Boharticus, Bonitoa, Boucekina, Brachycaudonia, Bupronotum, Caenacis, Caenocrepis, Calliprymna, Callitula, Canberrana, Capellia, Catolaccus, Cecidolampa, Cecidostiba, Cheiropachus, Chlorocytus, Chrysoglyphe, Coelopisthia, Conigastrus, Conomorium, Cratomus, Critogaster, Cyclogastrella, Cyrtophagoides, Cyrtoptyx, Dasyneurophaga, Delisleia, Delucchia, Dibrachoides, Dibrachys, Diglochis, Dimachus, Dinarmoides, Dinarmolaelaps, Dinarmus, Dineuticida, Dinotiscus, Dinotoides, Diourbelia, Dirhicnus, Doganlaria, Dorcatomophaga, Elderia, Endomychobius, Epanogmus, Epicatolaccus, Epipteromalus, Erdoesina, Erythromalus, Eulonchetron, Eumacepolus, Eurydinota, Eurydinoteloides, Eurydinotomorpha, Euteloida, Ezgia, Fedelia, Ficicola, Fijita, Frena, Gbelcia, Genangula, Globimesosoma, Grissellium, Guancheria, Gugolzia, Guinea, Guolina, Gyrinophagus, Habritella, Habritys, Habromalina, Halomalus, Halticopterella, Halticopteroides, Helocasis, Heterandrium, Heteroprymna, Heteroschema, Hillerita, Hlavka, Hobbya, Holcaeus, Homoporus, Huberina, Hypopteromalus, Ischyroptyx, Isocyrtella, Isocyrtus, Isoplatoides, Jaliscoa, Kaleva, Klabonosa, Kratka, Kukua, Kumarella, Lampoterma, Lariophagus, Laticlypa, Lenka, Leodamus, Leptomeraporus, Licteria, Lomonosoffiella, Lonchetron, Longinucha, Lyrcus, Lysirina, Lyubana, Makaronesa, Mazinawa, Megadicylus, Merallus, Meraporus, Merismoclea, Merismomorpha, Merisus, Mesopolobus, Metacolus, Meximalus, Mimencyrtus, Mirekia, Miristhma, Mokrzeckia, Monoksa, Morodora, Muscidifurax, Nadelaia, Narendrella, Nasonia, Neanica, Nedinotus, Neocatolaccus, Neolyubana, Neopolycystus, Nephelomalus, Nikolskayana, Norbanus, Nuchata, Oaxa, Obalana, Olchon, Oniticellobia, Ottawita, Oxyharma, Oxysychus, Pandelus, Panstenon, Paracarotomus, Paradinarmus, Paraiemea, Paroxyharma, Pegopus, Peridesmia, Perilampidea, Perniphora, Pestra, Pezilepsis, Phaenocytus, Platneptis, Platypteromalus, Procallitula, Propicroscytus, Propodeia, Pseudanogmus, Pseudetroxys, Pseudocatolaccus, Psilocera, Psilonotus, Psychophagoides, Psychophagus, Pterapicus, Pterisemoppa, Pteromalus, Pterosemigastra, Pterosemopsis, Ptinocida, Pycnetron, Quercanus, Rakosina, Raspela, Rhaphitelus, Rhopalicus, Rohatina, Roptrocerus, Sceptrothelys, Schizonotus, Sedma, Sigynia, Sisyridivora, Spaniopus, Sphegigastrella, Sphegipterosema, Sphegipterosemella, Spilomalus, Spintherus, Spodophagus, Staurothyreus, Stenetra, Stenomalina, Stenoselma, Stichocrepis, Stinoplus, Strejcekia, Synedrus, Systellogaster, Szelenyinus, Tachingousa, Tanina, Tanzanicesa, Termolampa, Thureonella, Tomicobia, Toxeumella, Toxeumelloides, Trichargyrus, Trichokaleva, Trichomalopsis, Trichomalus, Tricolas, Trimeromicrus, Trinotiscus, Tritneptis, Trjapitzinia, Trychnosoma, Tsela, Uniclypea, Urolepis, Usubaia, Veltrusia, Vrestovia, Xiphydriophagus, Yanchepia, Yosemitea, Zdenekiana
