= Jaliscoa =

Jaliscoa may refer to:

- Jaliscoa (plant), a flowering plant genus in the family Asteraceae
- Jaliscoa (wasp), a wasp genus in the family Pteromalidae
