= Yosemitea =

Yosemitea may refer to:

- Yosemitea (plant), a genus of flowering plants in the family Brassicaceae
- Yosemitea (wasp), a genus of wasps in the family Pteromalidae
