= Strejcekia elegans =

Scientific classification
- Kingdom: Animalia
- Phylum: Arthropoda
- Class: Insecta
- Order: Hymenoptera
- Family: Pteromalidae
- Genus: Strejcekia
- Species: S. elegans

Binomial name
- Strejcekia elegans Boucek, 1972

Species of wasp

Strejcekia elegans is a species of parasitoid wasps in the subfamily Pteromalinae. It is found in Europe.
