= Lariophagus distinguendus =

Scientific classification
- Kingdom: Animalia
- Phylum: Arthropoda
- Class: Insecta
- Order: Hymenoptera
- Family: Pteromalidae
- Genus: Lariophagus
- Species: L. distinguendus

Binomial name
- Lariophagus distinguendus (Förster, 1841)

Synonyms
- Arthrolytus puncticollis Möller, 1882; Eupelmus urozonus Vayssière, 1900; Lariophagus distinguendus Hase, 1919; Lariophagus distinguendus Kurdjumov, 1913; Lariophagus puncticollis Kurdjumov, 1913; Lariophagus puncticollis Ruschka, 1915; Meraporus brevicornis Marchal, 1900; Meraporus graminicola Curtis, 1860; Meraporus utibilis Tucker, 19107 (protonym); Pteromalus calandrae Howard, 1881; Pteromalus distinguendus Arnold Förster, 1841 (protonym); Pteromalus oryzae Cameron, 1891; Pteromalus oryzinus Rondani, 1877

Species of wasp

Lariophagus distinguendus is a idiobiont ectoparasitoid hymenopteran in the family Pteromalidae, superfamily Chalcidoidea. It parasitizes small beetle larvae concealed in seeds, as well as prepupae and pupae in their cocoons. It is used for the biological control of several beetle pests of stored products, particularly in central Europe, where it is produced commercially and distributed by at least 11 companies.

== Taxonomy ==
Arnold Förster described this species in 1841 under the name Pteromalus distinguendus. In 1913, N. Kurdjumov moved it to the genus Lariophagus. While studying the types of Meraporus calandrae Howard and Meraporus utibilis Tucker, Hase in 1919 established their synonymy with Lariophagus distinguendus.

== Description ==
The female is 2 to 3 mm long, dark blue, basal part of abdomen green, wings white with yellow-brown veins. The male is 1.1 to 2 mm long.

== Diet ==
Lariophagus distinguendus will attack and eat Cigarette Beetles (L. Serricorne) at the pupal and larval stage. Females will also oviposit among the eggs of the Cigarette Beetle.

== Host species ==
Its hosts include, but are not limited to:

- Callosobruchus chinensis (adzuki bean beetle)
- Callosobruchus maculatus (cowpea weevil)
- Gibbium psylloides (hump beetle)
- Ptinus tectus (Australian spider beetle)
- Rhyzopertha dominica (lesser grain borer)
- Sitophilus granarius (wheat weevil)
- Sitophilus oryzae (rice weevil)
- Stegobium paniceum (drugstore beetle)
