= Pteromalus venustus =

Scientific classification
- Kingdom: Animalia
- Phylum: Arthropoda
- Class: Insecta
- Order: Hymenoptera
- Family: Pteromalidae
- Genus: Pteromalus
- Species: P. venustus

Binomial name
- Pteromalus venustus Statz, 1938

Parasitic wasp

Pteromalus venustus is a small gregarious hymenopteran parasitoid of the alfalfa leafcutting bee. It can cause serious economic loss through the loss of alfalfa leafcutting bees used for pollination.

== Life cycle ==
Upon finding an alfalfa leafcutting bee leaf cell containing a prepupa or pupa, the P. venustus female insert its ovipositor through the wall of the cell and sting the bee larva or pupa, thus paralyzing it. It then lays a number of eggs onto the paralized host, and goes on to searching for other leafcutting bee cells. The eggs hatch within 24-48 h, and the larvae immediately start feeding on the paralyzed host. If the temperatures are sufficiently cold (below ~15 °C) the P. venustus pre-pupae will overwinter, but if the temperatures remain sufficiently warm they will pupate and metamorphose to adults. To exit a leaf cell, one P. venustus adult chews an exit hole, through which all the other P. venustus present within this cell will exit. Adults mate immediately, and the females then search for hosts to parasitize.
