= Z. spinosa =

Z. spinosa may refer to:

- Zilla spinosa, a short leaved plant species
- Ziziphus spinosa, a buckthorn species in the genus Ziziphus

== See also ==
- Spinosa (disambiguation)
