= Miscogaster elegans =

Scientific classification
- Kingdom: Animalia
- Phylum: Arthropoda
- Class: Insecta
- Order: Hymenoptera
- Family: Pteromalidae
- Genus: Miscogaster
- Species: M. elegans

Binomial name
- Miscogaster elegans Walker, 1833

Synonyms
- Chrysolampus punctiger Nees, 1834; Lamprotatus elegans (Walker, 1833)

Species of wasp

Miscogaster elegans is a species of chalcid wasps in the Pteromalidae family and is found in Europe. Hosts are various species in the Agromyzidae family.
