= Cecidostiba =

Scientific classification
- Domain: Eukaryota
- Kingdom: Animalia
- Phylum: Arthropoda
- Class: Insecta
- Order: Hymenoptera
- Family: Pteromalidae
- Subfamily: Pteromalinae
- Tribe: Pteromalini
- Genus: Cecidostiba; Thompson, 1878

Type species
- Etroxys rugifrons Thomson, 1878

Synonyms
- Rhizomalus Bouček, 1972

Genus of wasps

Cecidostiba is a genus of parasitoid wasps in the tribe Pteromalini. All species in the genus are parasitoids of gall wasps (Cynipidae) on Quercus, Castanea and Acer.

As of 2025, there are 9 described species in the genus.

== Description ==
Species in the genus are parasitoids of gall wasps (Cynipidae) on Quercus, Castanea and Acer, along with other similar genera in the same tribe.

This genus can be distinguished from other similar genera such as Hobbya and Caenacis based on the presence of piliferous punctures on the mesoscutum.

== Species ==
This genus contains the following species:

- Cecidostiba atra Askew, 1975
- Cecidostiba docimus (Walker, 1839)
- Cecidostiba fungosus (Geoffroy, 1785)
- Cecidostiba fushica Kamijo, 1981
- Cecidostiba geganius (Walker, 1848)
- Cecidostiba ilicina Nieves-Aldrey & Askew, 1988
- Cecidostiba jucundus (Förster, 1841)
- Cecidostiba saportai Graham, 1984
- Cecidostiba semifascia (Walker, 1835)
