= Parurios =

Scientific classification
- Kingdom: Animalia
- Phylum: Arthropoda
- Class: Insecta
- Order: Hymenoptera
- Family: Pteromalidae
- Genus: Parurios; Girault, 1913

Genus of wasps

Parurios is a genus of wasps belonging to the family Pteromalidae.

The species of this genus are found in Central America.

== Species ==
- Parurios argenticoxae (Girault, 1915)
- Parurios atriscutum (Girault, 1933)
- Parurios australiana Girault, 1913
- Parurios conoidea Xiao & Huang, 2000
- Parurios fusca (Girault, 1915)
- Parurios keatsi (Girault, 1922)
- Parurios keralensis Narendran, 2000
- Parurios poei (Girault, 1915)
- Parurios truncatipennis (Dodd, 1924)
