= Muscidifurax uniraptor =

Scientific classification
- Domain: Eukaryota
- Kingdom: Animalia
- Phylum: Arthropoda
- Class: Insecta
- Order: Hymenoptera
- Family: Pteromalidae
- Genus: Muscidifurax
- Species: M. uniraptor

Binomial name
- Muscidifurax uniraptor Kogan & Legner, 1970

Species of wasp

Muscidifurax uniraptor is a species of wasp (the taxonomic order Hymenoptera) in the family Pteromalidae. The species does not currently have a common name. M. uniraptor is a pupal parasitoid of synanthropic filth-breeding Diptera and is a natural enemy of the housefly Musca domestica and the stable fly Stomoxys calcitrans.

== Wolbachia symbiosis ==
Wolbachia is a cytoplasmically inherited intracellular bacterium. It can generally be found in the reproductive organs of its host species, and can be transferred from female to offspring through the egg cytoplasm. This species causes many reproductive and sex ratio disorders in a range of insect species. However, it seems to be beneficial when present in the host species, M. uniraptor, increasing the host's fecundity or the ability to induce reproduction of fertile, viable offspring specifically under uniparental reproduction. The actual process of gamete duplication differs among the insects that have been infected with Wolbachia, including a similar species of wasp called Muscidifurax raptorellus. The bacterium has been known to cause negative side effects such as cytoplasmic incompatibility, thelytoky, and feminization in the reproductive habits of these various insect species. Traditionally, M. uniraptor determines the sex of offspring using haplodiploidy. The males are produced as haploids from unfertilized eggs while the females are produced as diploids from fertilized eggs. According to this practice, M. uniraptor would normally produce both male and female offspring. However, in M. uniraptor, Wolbachia causes thelytoky, a type of parthenogenesis in which females asexually reproduce only female offspring.

M. uniraptor generally follows the process of automixis, or meiotic thelytoky, where meiosis occurs in the developing oocyte and diploidy is restored by fusing the meiotic or mitotic products yielding diploid females or haploid males. However, the bacterium, Wolbachia, has evolved with this species of wasp through vertical transfer to induce irreversible thelytokous reproduction of only female offspring. When M. uniraptor females receive experimentally administered antibiotics, such as rifampicin, the strains of Wolbachia become eradicated, and the females should hypothetically be able to produce both male and female offspring since the bacteria are not present to induce thelytoky. However, the resulting male offspring of these experiments do not carry viable sperm. This implies that Wolbachia establishes itself early in the females in order to ensure its transfer into further hosts, at the risk of removing the current host's ability to sexually reproduce by not allowing it to produce fertile, viable male offspring. There are three primary reasons for why M. uniraptor has become so dependent on Wolbachia for survival and reproduction. The males of the species no longer produce viable sperm for sexual reproduction, and the females do not respond to any cues or advances by the males for sexual reproduction. Finally, the females lose a major muscle in their spermathecae that allow them to contain sperm after sexual reproduction. Therefore, without the symbiotic relationship between Wolbachia and M. uniraptor, the wasp species would not persist alone by means of sexual reproduction because of these evolutionary alterations that increase the fitness of the persisting relationship with the bacteria. The bacteria have seemingly inhibited the wasps' reproductive pathways through selective pressures to increase the fitness of their relationship, and the wasp is unlikely to regress to its former state of sexual reproduction as a result of these genetic alterations. Muscidifurax uniraptor now holds an endosymbiotic relationship with Wolbachia, and it has evolved to depend on these bacteria for reproduction and survival which results in the successful relationship we currently observe.
