= Espinoza =

Espinoza or Espinosa may refer to:

- Espinosa, Minas Gerais, a city in Minas Gerais, Brazil
- Espinosa de los Monteros, a city in Burgos, Spain
- Espinosa (Dorado), a division of Dorado, Puerto Rico
- Espinosa (wasp), a wasp genus in the subfamily Ormocerinae
- Espinosa (surname), people with the surname Espinoza or Espinosa

== Other uses ==
- Battle of Espinosa, 1808 battle in Spain during the Napoleonic Wars
- Ing. Fernando Espinoza Gutiérrez International Airport serving Santiago de Querétaro, Mexico
- Luisa Amanda Espinoza Association of Nicaraguan Women, Nicaraguan women’s political group

== See also ==
- Spinoza (disambiguation)
- Spinosa (disambiguation)
