= Ormocerus dirigoius =

Scientific classification
- Kingdom: Animalia
- Phylum: Arthropoda
- Class: Insecta
- Order: Hymenoptera
- Family: Pteromalidae
- Genus: Ormocerus
- Species: O. dirigoius

Binomial name
- Ormocerus dirigoius Morin & Gates, 2017

Species of wasp

Ormocerus dirigoius is a species of stingless wasp. It is native to Maine, United States. It is likely a parasitoid of an oak gall wasp in the family Cynipidae. This species was found in bi-catch of samples collected for another research project.
