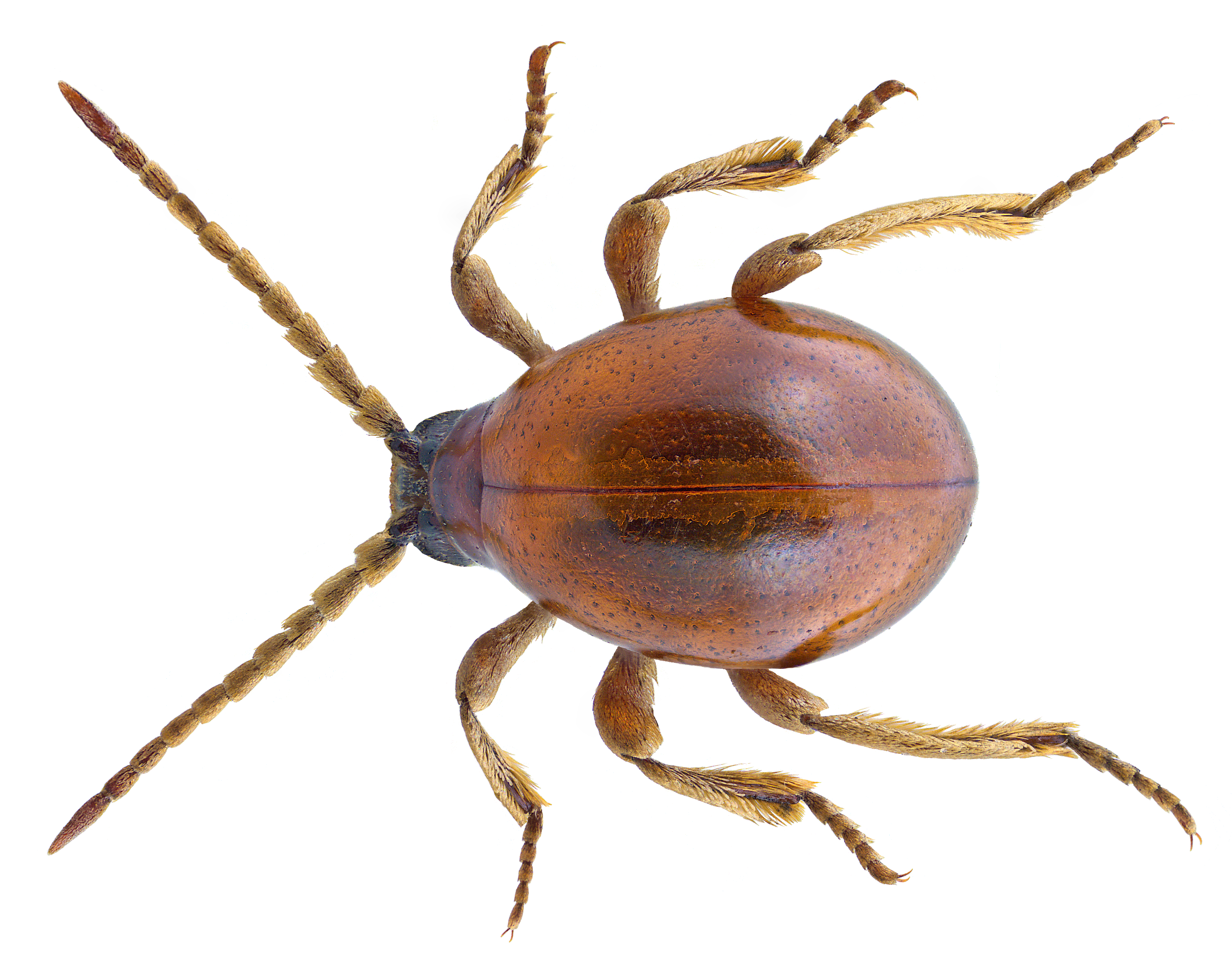

Scientific classification
- Kingdom: Animalia
- Phylum: Arthropoda
- Clade: Pancrustacea
- Class: Insecta
- Order: Coleoptera
- Suborder: Polyphaga
- Family: Ptinidae
- Genus: Gibbium
- Species: G. psylloides

Binomial name
- Gibbium psylloides Czenpiński, 1778

= Gibbium psylloides =

Species of beetle

Gibbium psylloides, also known as the hump beetle or the smooth spider beetle (the latter of which it shares with Gibbium aequinoctiale), is a species of spider beetle in the genus Gibbium. It is native to the Palearctic, Southeast Asia, and North Africa. It was first described and given a binomial name by Paweł Czenpiński in 1778. North American references to G. psylloides actually refer to Gibbium aequinoctiale.
