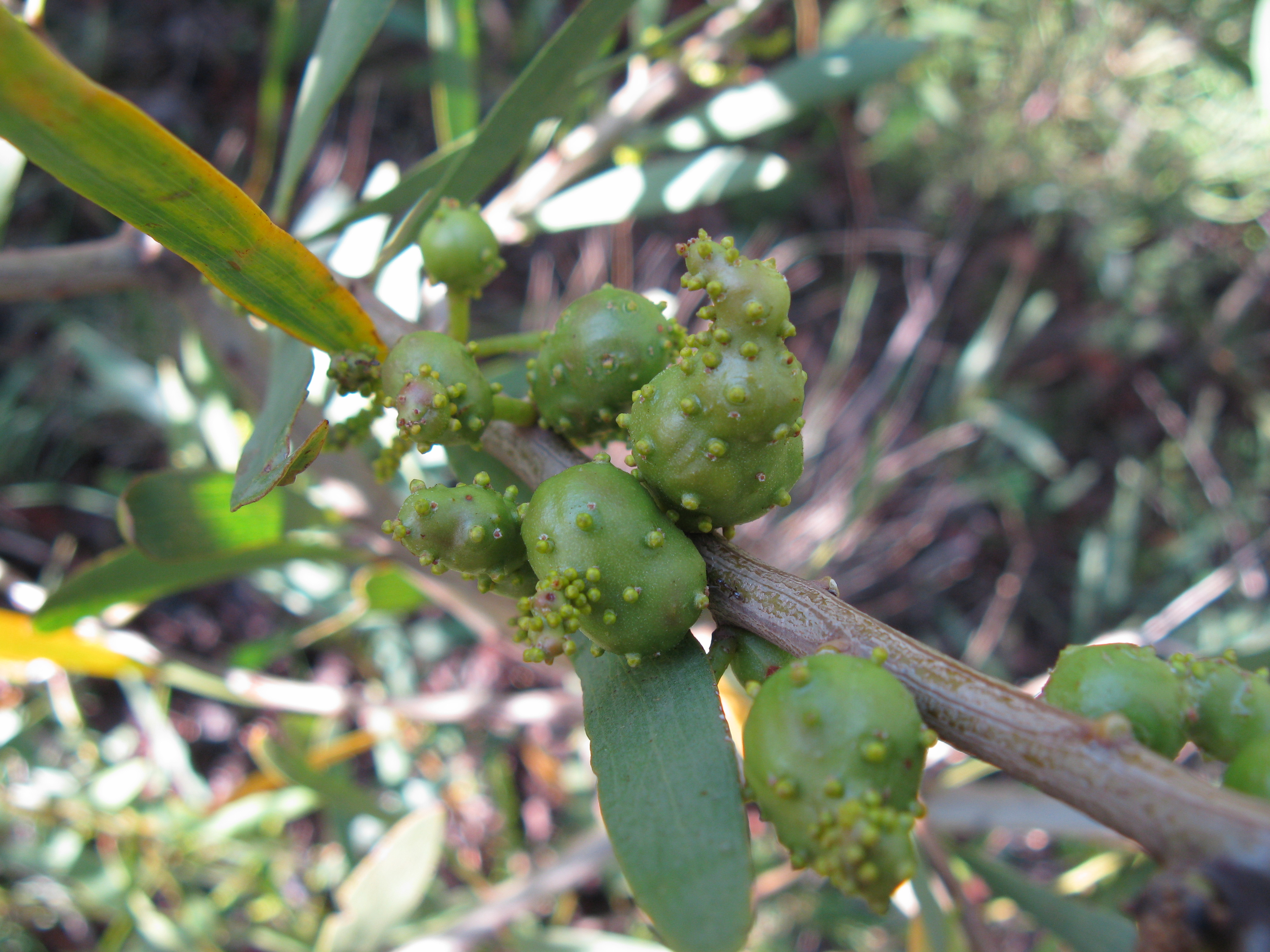
- Galls of Trichilogaster acaciaelongifoliae on Acacia longifolia

Scientific classification
- Kingdom: Animalia
- Phylum: Arthropoda
- Clade: Pancrustacea
- Class: Insecta
- Order: Hymenoptera
- Family: Pteromalidae
- Subfamily: Ormocerinae; Walker, 1833

= Ormocerinae =

Subfamily of wasps

Ormocerinae is a subfamily in the chalcidoid wasp family Pteromalidae. The subfamily used to contain the three tribes Ormocerini, Melanosomellini, and Systasini. However, the latter two have been elevated to family level (Melanosomellidae, and Systasidae) following phylogenetic analysis of the Chalcidoidea superfamily.

== Genera ==
There are currently 8 recognized genera in the Ormocerinae subfamily.

- Blascoa Askew, 1997
- Brachyscelidiphaga Ashmead, 1900
- Cecidoxenus Ashmead, 1904
- Indoclava Gupta, Khan & Agnihotri, 2006
- Monazosa Dzhanokmen, 1975
- Nodisoplata Graham, 1969
- Ormocerus Walker, 1834
- Syntasis Walker, 1834
