= Trisecodes =

Scientific classification
- Kingdom: Animalia
- Phylum: Arthropoda
- Class: Insecta
- Order: Hymenoptera
- Family: Systasidae
- Genus: Trisecodes; Delvare and LaSalle, 2000

Type species
- Trisecodes agromyzae Delvare and LaSalle, 2000

Species
- Trisecodes africanum Gumovsky, 2014; Trisecodes agromyzae Delvare and LaSalle, 2000

Genus of wasps

Trisecodes is a genus of parasitic chalcid wasps of the family Systasidae. The genus was originally placed in Eulophidae, based on a number of morphological features, but molecular evidence suggests that the genus is more closely related to Systasis and Semiotellus. The type species (Trisecodes agromyzae) is a parasitoid of a range of Agromyzid leaf-mining flies.

There are two known species:

- Trisecodes agromyzae from Belize, Costa Rica and Guadeloupe; and
- Trisecodes africanum from Cameroon, Guinea and Uganda.

== Description ==
These are small (0.6-0.85 mm long), dark wasps. Their tarsi have only three segments. Each antenna has three short funicular segments and a clava with two segments.
