= Trichomalus =

Scientific classification
- Domain: Eukaryota
- Kingdom: Animalia
- Phylum: Arthropoda
- Class: Insecta
- Order: Hymenoptera
- Family: Pteromalidae
- Subfamily: Pteromalinae
- Genus: Trichomalus; Thomson, 1878

Genus of parasitoid wasps

Trichomalus is a genus of parasitoid wasps belonging to the family Pteromalidae.

The genus has an almost cosmopolitan distribution.

== Species ==
The following species are recognised in the genus Trichomalus:

- Trichomalus acraea (Walker, 1839)
- Trichomalus acuminatus Delucchi & Graham, 1956
- Trichomalus aglaus (Walker, 1845)
- Trichomalus alonsoi Nieves-Aldrey & Garrido, 1994
- Trichomalus alopius (Walker, 1848)
- Trichomalus althaeae (Erdös, 1953)
- Trichomalus amphimedon (Walker, 1839)
- Trichomalus annulatus (Forster, 1841)
- Trichomalus apertus (Walker, 1835)
- Trichomalus automedon (Walker, 1839)
- Trichomalus bracteatus (Walker, 1835)
- Trichomalus campestris (Walker, 1834)
- Trichomalus cardui (Masi, 1954)
- Trichomalus cerpheres (Walker, 1839)
- Trichomalus cinctus (Forster, 1841)
- Trichomalus conifer (Walker, 1836)
- Trichomalus consuetus (Walker, 1872)
- Trichomalus coryphe (Walker, 1839)
- Trichomalus cristatus (Forster, 1841)
- Trichomalus cupreus Delucchi & Graham, 1956
- Trichomalus curtus (Walker, 1835)
- Trichomalus daimenes (Walker, 1839)
- Trichomalus deiphon (Walker, 1843)
- Trichomalus deudorix (Walker, 1839)
- Trichomalus elongatus Delucchi & Graham, 1956
- Trichomalus eurypon (Walker, 1847)
- Trichomalus exquisitus (Forster, 1841)
- Trichomalus flagellaris Graham, 1969
- Trichomalus frontalis (Thomson, 1878)
- Trichomalus fulgidus (Forster, 1841)
- Trichomalus fulvipes (Walker, 1836)
- Trichomalus generalis (Forster, 1841)
- Trichomalus germanus (Dalla Torre, 1898)
- Trichomalus glabellus (Forster, 1841)
- Trichomalus gracilicornis (Zetterstedt, 1838)
- Trichomalus gynetelus (Walker, 1835)
- Trichomalus habis (Walker, 1843)
- Trichomalus helvipes (Walker, 1834)
- Trichomalus hippo (Walker, 1838)
- Trichomalus inscitus (Walker, 1835)
- Trichomalus intestinarius (Forster, 1841)
- Trichomalus kannurensis Sureshan & Narendran, 1995
- Trichomalus keralensis Sureshan, 2002
- Trichomalus lepidus (Forster, 1841)
- Trichomalus lonchaeae Boucek, 1959
- Trichomalus lucidus (Walker, 1835)
- Trichomalus nanus (Walker, 1836)
- Trichomalus norvegicus Hedqvist, 1982
- Trichomalus notabilis (Forster, 1841)
- Trichomalus obsessorius (Forster, 1841)
- Trichomalus oxygyne Graham, 1969
- Trichomalus palustris Erdos, 1957
- Trichomalus perfectus (Walker, 1835)
- Trichomalus pexatus (Walker, 1835)
- Trichomalus pherospilus Dzhanokmen, 1975
- Trichomalus pilosus (Ratzeburg, 1844)
- Trichomalus placidus (Walker, 1834)
- Trichomalus posticus (Walker, 1834)
- Trichomalus repandus (Walker, 1835)
- Trichomalus robustus (Walker, 1835)
- Trichomalus rufinus (Walker, 1835)
- Trichomalus rugosus Delucchi & Graham, 1956
- Trichomalus saptine (Walker, 1839)
- Trichomalus statutus (Forster, 1841)
- Trichomalus sufflatus Delucchi, 1962
- Trichomalus tenellus (Walker, 1834)
- Trichomalus xanthe (Walker, 1845)
