= Syntomopus =

Scientific classification
- Kingdom: Animalia
- Phylum: Arthropoda
- Clade: Pancrustacea
- Class: Insecta
- Order: Hymenoptera
- Family: Pteromalidae
- Subfamily: Miscogastrinae
- Genus: Syntomopus; Walker, 1833

Genus of wasps

Syntomopus is a genus of the family Pteromalidae. The genus name was first published by Walker, 1833.

== Species ==
The species include:

- Syntomopus agromyzae Hedqvist, 1973
- Syntomopus amaravathicus Narendran & Girishkumar, 2012
- Syntomopus americanus Ashmead, 1895
- Syntomopus arpedes Heydon, 1993
- Syntomopus carinatus Sureshan & Narendran, 1999
- Syntomopus crassicornis (Szelényi, 1970)
- Syntomopus fuscipes Huang, 1991
- Syntomopus gracilis De Santis, 1976
- Syntomopus incisoideus Howard, 1897
- Syntomopus incisus Thomson, 1878
- Syntomopus incurvus Walker, 1833
- Syntomopus nigrus Sureshan & Narendran, 1999
- Syntomopus oviceps Thomson, 1878
- Syntomopus pallipes Rudow, 1886
- Syntomopus parisii De Santis, 1976
- Syntomopus rajamalaiensis Sureshan & Narendran, 1999
- Syntomopus shakespearei (Girault, 1926)
- Syntomopus thoracicus Walker, 1833
- Syntomopus turanicus Dzhanokmen, 2000
