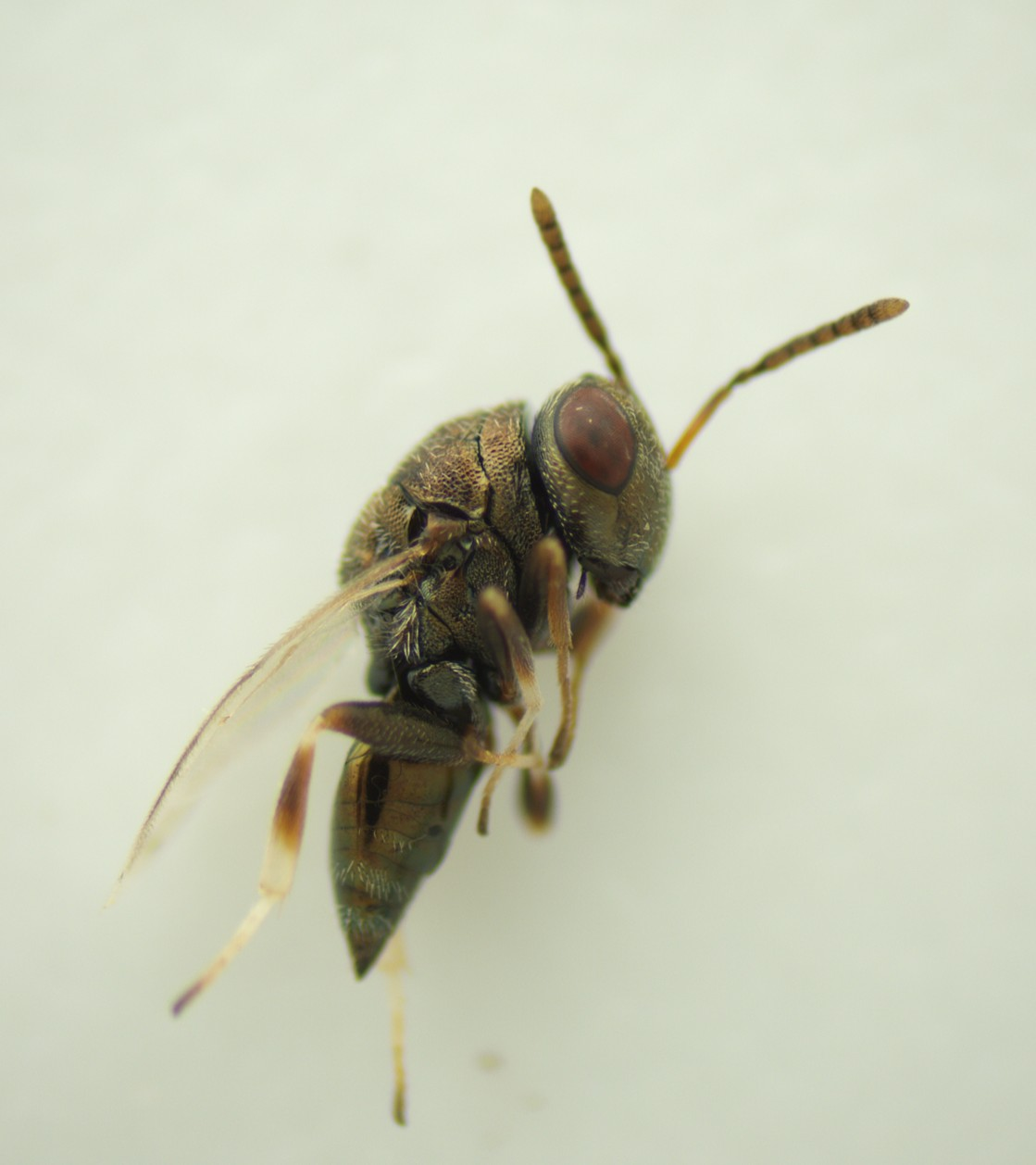
- Image of Dinarmus

Scientific classification
- Kingdom: Animalia
- Phylum: Arthropoda
- Clade: Pancrustacea
- Class: Insecta
- Order: Hymenoptera
- Family: Pteromalidae
- Subfamily: Pteromalinae
- Genus: Dinarmus; Thomson, 1878

= Dinarmus =

Genus of wasps

Dinarmus is a genus of wasps belonging to the family Pteromalidae.

The genus has almost cosmopolitan distribution. Many species in this genus are parasitoids, and some species (such as D. basalis and D. vagabundus) are used in integrated pest management to prevent the destruction of cowpea crops by Callosobruchus larvae.

Species:

- Dinarmus acutus (Thomson, 1878)
- Dinarmus altifrons (Walker, 1862)
- Dinarmus basalis (Rondani, 1877)
- Dinarmus colemani (Crawford, 1913)
- Dinarmus garouae (Risbec, 1956)
- Dinarmus italicus (Masi, 1922)
- Dinarmus ivorensis Rasplus, 1986
- Dinarmus lamtoensis Rasplus, 1989
- Dinarmus latialis (Masi, 1924)
- Dinarmus maculatus (Masi, 1924)
- Dinarmus magnus (Rohwer, 1934)
- Dinarmus major (Masi, 1924)
- Dinarmus parvula (Masi, 1922)
- Dinarmus schwenkei Roomi, Khan & Khan, 1973
- Dinarmus simus (Girault, 1915)
- Dinarmus steffani Rasplus, 1986
- Dinarmus vagabundus (Timberlake, 1926)
- Dinarmus yagouae (Risbec, 1956)
