= Lariophagus =

Scientific classification
- Kingdom: Animalia
- Phylum: Arthropoda
- Class: Insecta
- Order: Hymenoptera
- Family: Pteromalidae
- Subfamily: Pteromalinae
- Tribe: Pteromalini
- Genus: Lariophagus; Crawford, 1909

Genus of insects

Lariophaugus is a genus of hymenopteran parasitoids in the family Pteromalidae. The genus was described by American entomologist and taxonomist James Chamberlain Crawford, with the type species Lariophagus texanus.

== Species ==
Species include:

- Lariophagus distinguendus Förster, 1841
- Lariophagus dryorhizoxeni (Ashmead, 1886)
- Lariophagus fimbriatus Boucek, 1965
- Lariophagus kuwayamai Kamijo, 1981
- Lariophagus obtusus Kamijo, 1981
- Lariophagus rufipes Hedqvist, 1978
- Lariophagus texanus Crawford, 1909
