= Colotrechnus =

Scientific classification
- Kingdom: Animalia
- Phylum: Arthropoda
- Clade: Pancrustacea
- Class: Insecta
- Order: Hymenoptera
- Family: Pteromalidae
- Subfamily: Colotrechninae
- Genus: Colotrechnus; Thomson, 1878

Synonyms
- Zanonia Masi, 1921

Genus of insects

Colotrechnus is a genus of wasps belonging to the family Pteromalidae.

The species of this genus are found in Europe and North America.

Species:

- Colotrechnus agromyzae Subba Rao, 1981
- Colotrechnus ignotus Burks, 1958
- Colotrechnus subcoeruleus Thomson, 1878
- Colotrechnus viridis (Masi, 1921)
