= Paweł Czenpiński =

Polish physician, botanist, zoologist, entomologist and educator (1755–1793)

Paweł Czenpiński (1755 – 1793) was a Polish physician, botanist, zoologist, entomologist and educator. He was among the earliest followers of Linnean binomial system in Poland where he coauthored one of the first zoology textbooks written in Polish, Zoologia czyli Zwierzętopismo, dla szkół narodowych, published in 1789.

== Life and work ==
Czenpinski went to study medicine in 1772 and graduated in 1780 from the University of Vienna then known as Rudolphina. He defended a doctorate in 1778 titled Dissertatio inauguralis zoologico-medica, sistens totius regni animalis genera, in classes et ordines Linnæana methodo digesta, præfixa cuilibet classi terminorum explicatione, quam annuente inclyta facultate medica in antiquissima ac celeberrima Universitate Vindobonensi publicæ disquisitioni submittit Paulus de Czenpinski, nobilis Polonus Varsoviensis. Disputabitur in universitatis palatio. Die mensis Aprilis anno. This publication dedicated to Prince Adam Czartoryski (1734–1823) included a description of the beetle species Gibbium psylloides. In Vienna, medical education was being reformed by Gerard Van Swieten (1700–1772) from Leiden and it is possible that Czenpinski was influenced by another Leiden naturalist Nikolaus Joseph von Jacquin (1727–1817). Linnaeus and von Jacquin corresponded heavily and it was possibly through this connection that Czenpinski adopted the Linnean system for his thesis. Together they travelled in the Alps. It is thought that he travelled through Europe after his dissertation and in September 25th, 1779, Czenpiński was elected correspondent member of the Société Royale de Médecine (Royal Medical Society) in Paris. In 1782, he went on a scientific expedition with John Dominic Peter Jaskiewicz (1749–1809) to make zoological, botanical and geological observations of the Carpathian Mountains.

After returning to Poland became an employee of the Society for Elementary Books (established in 1775 and empowered to develop programs and school textbooks) and was a member of the National Education Commission. He became deeply involved in developing curricula and textbooks. In 1789, he and Krzysztof Kluk (1739–1796) wrote the zoology textbook for schools titled Zoologia czyli Zwierzętopismo, dla szkół narodowych. This was based on an earlier textbook written in Latin by Michał Krzysztof Hanow (1695–1773). This text made use of the Linnean system of nomenclature and involved a teaching that began with an "ascending order" of anatomical complexity in life forms. He examined many zoological collections including that of Anna Jabłonowska (1728–1800) in Siemiatycze to help in this work. Together with Walenty Gagatkiewicz he founded the Warsaw School of Anatomy and Surgery (1789).
