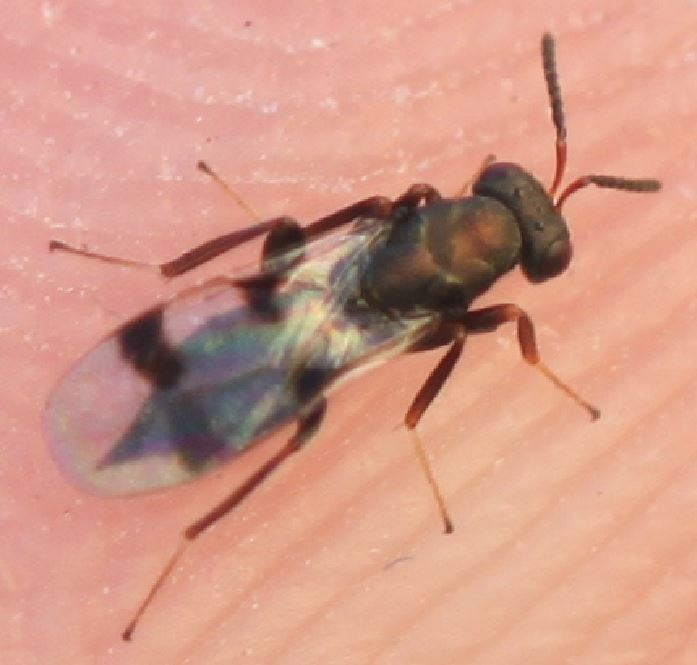
- Cheiropachus quadrum

Scientific classification
- Domain: Eukaryota
- Kingdom: Animalia
- Phylum: Arthropoda
- Class: Insecta
- Order: Hymenoptera
- Family: Pteromalidae
- Subfamily: Pteromalinae
- Genus: Cheiropachus; Westwood, 1829

= Cheiropachus =

Genus of wasps

Cheiropachus is a genus of insects belonging to the family Pteromalidae.

The genus was first described by Westwood in 1829.

The species of this genus are found in Europe and North America.

== Species ==
The following species are recognised in the genus Cheiropachus:

- Cheiropachus arizonensis (Ashmead, 1904)
- Cheiropachus brunneri Crawford, 1912
- Cheiropachus cavicapitis Yang, 1996
- Cheiropachus juglandis Yang, 1996
- Cheiropachus mai Xiao & Huang, 2001
- Cheiropachus obscuripes Brues, 1910
- Cheiropachus quadrum (Fabricius, 1787)
- Cheiropachus scolyti (Ashmead, 1894)
- Cheiropachus tripunctatus (Geoffroy, 1785)
- Cheiropachus vimineus Xiao & Huang, 2001
