= Strejcekia =

Scientific classification
- Kingdom: Animalia
- Phylum: Arthropoda
- Class: Insecta
- Order: Hymenoptera
- Family: Pteromalidae
- Subfamily: Pteromalinae
- Tribe: Pteromalini
- Genus: Strejcekia; Boucek, 1972

Species
- Strejcekia brevior; Strejcekia elegans

Genus of wasps

Strejcekia is a genus of parasitoid wasps in the subfamily Pteromalinae.
