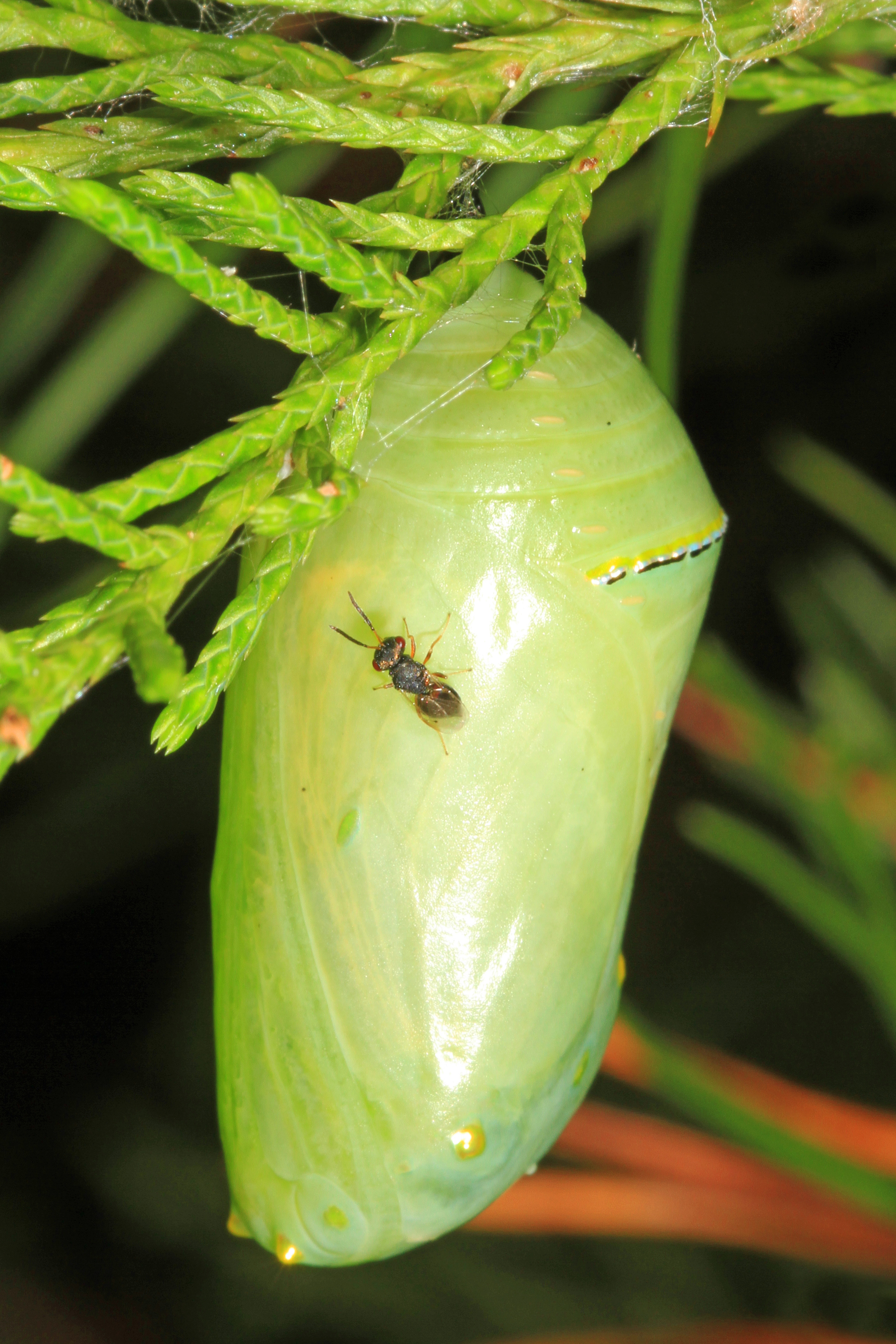
- P.cassotis on a monarch butterfly chrysalis

Scientific classification
- Domain: Eukaryota
- Kingdom: Animalia
- Phylum: Arthropoda
- Class: Insecta
- Order: Hymenoptera
- Family: Pteromalidae
- Genus: Pteromalus
- Species: P. cassotis

Binomial name
- Pteromalus cassotis Walker, 1847

Synonyms
- Pteromalus archippi Howard, 1889

= Pteromalus cassotis =

Parasitic wasp

Pteromalus cassotis is a species of parasitic wasp in the family Pteromalidae that parasitizes the chrysalides of monarch butterflies. They are gregarious parasitoids, meaning a single female lays many eggs in a single host. Research into this species has documented that up to 425 adult wasps can emerge from a single chrysalis. The wasps have a heavy female bias, averaging 90% female. Maximum entropy models suggest that the natural habitat of this species encompasses the continental United States, southern Canada and parts of Mexico; areas inhabited by the caterpillars of monarch butterflies, which are the larvae's hosts.
