= Stenomalina =

Scientific classification
- Kingdom: Animalia
- Phylum: Arthropoda
- Clade: Pancrustacea
- Class: Insecta
- Order: Hymenoptera
- Family: Pteromalidae
- Subfamily: Pteromalinae
- Genus: Stenomalina; Ghesquière, 1946

Genus of insects

Stenomalina is a genus of insects belonging to the family Pteromalidae.

The species of this genus are found in Eurasia and North America.

Species:

- Stenomalina chloris (Walker, 1836)
- Stenomalina communis (Nees, 1834)
- Stenomalina iera (Walker, 1844) - primary parasitoid of Episyrphus balteatus
- Stenomalina jasoni Tselikh, Lee et Ku, 2025
- Stenomalina medeaeTselikh, Lee et Ku, 2025
- Stenomalina micans (Olivier, 1813)
- Stenomalina rufigaster Vikberg, 2014
