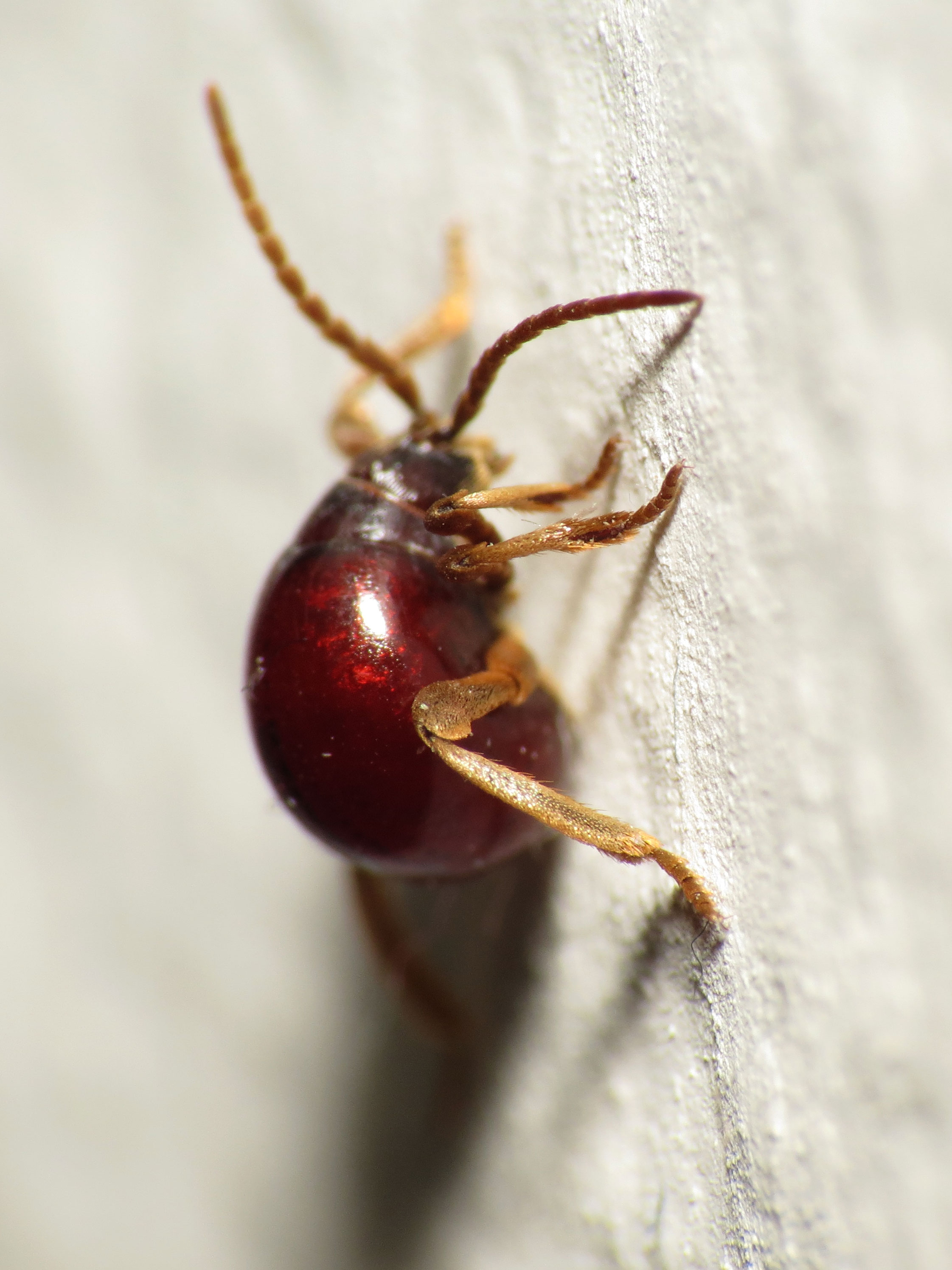

Scientific classification
- Kingdom: Animalia
- Phylum: Arthropoda
- Clade: Pancrustacea
- Class: Insecta
- Order: Coleoptera
- Suborder: Polyphaga
- Family: Ptinidae
- Tribe: Gibbiini
- Genus: Gibbium
- Species: G. aequinoctiale

Binomial name
- Gibbium aequinoctiale Boieldieu, 1854

= Gibbium aequinoctiale =

Species of beetle

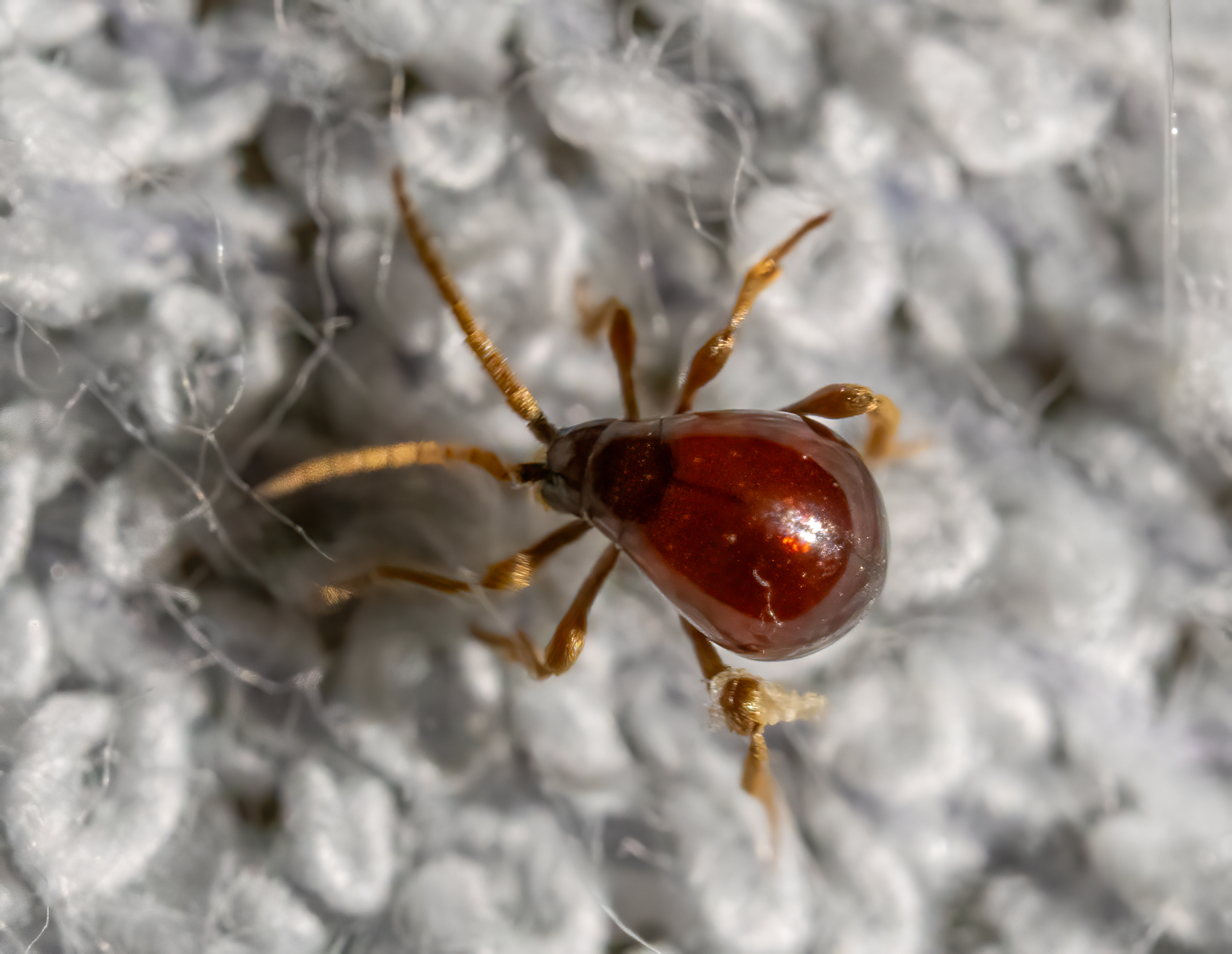
Gibbium aequinoctiale

Gibbium aequinoctiale, the smooth spider beetle, is a species of spider beetle in the family Ptinidae. It is found in the Caribbean, Europe and Northern Asia (excluding China), Central America, North America, and South America. It has been reported from many parts of the world as Gibbium psylloides.
