= Ablaxia =

Scientific classification
- Kingdom: Animalia
- Phylum: Arthropoda
- Class: Insecta
- Order: Hymenoptera
- Family: Pteromalidae
- Subfamily: Pteromalinae
- Tribe: Pteromalini
- Genus: Ablaxia; Delucchi, 1957

Species
- Ablaxia anaxenor; Ablaxia asinus; Ablaxia crassicornis; Ablaxia megachlora; Ablaxia parviclava; Ablaxia planiscuta; Ablaxia prothous; Ablaxia robusta; Ablaxia squamifera; Ablaxia temporalis; Ablaxia traulus

Genus of wasps

Ablaxia is a genus of wasps in the family Pteromalidae.
