= Spinoza (disambiguation) =

Baruch Spinoza (1632–1677) was a Dutch philosopher.

Spinoza may also refer to:

- Spinoza (book), a 1951 book by Stuart Hampshire
- Spinoza, a 2004 book by Richard H. Popkin
- Spinoza: Practical Philosophy, a 1970 book by Gilles Deleuze
- Spinoza Prize (Spinozapremie), the highest scientific award in the Netherlands
- 7142 Spinoza, a main-belt asteroid
- Spinoza (beetle), a beetle genus of the family Cleridae (checkered beetles)

== See also ==
- Spinosa (disambiguation)
- Espinoza (disambiguation)
- David Spinozza, American guitarist and producer
