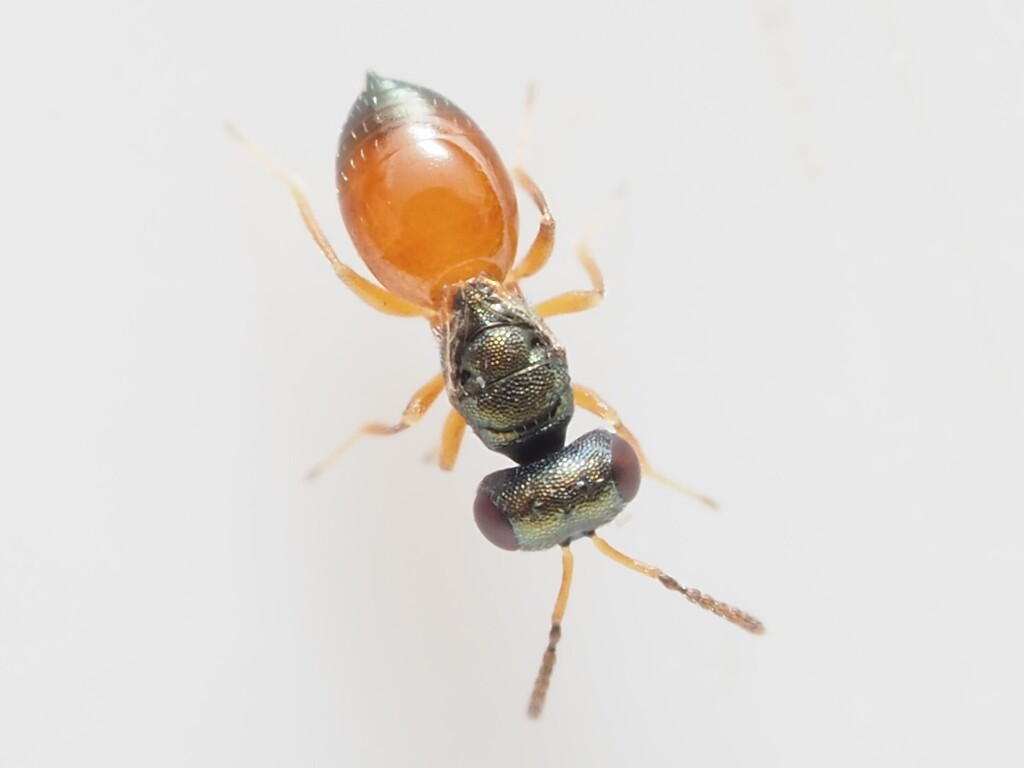
- Callitula pyrrhogaster from Wales, UK

Scientific classification
- Kingdom: Animalia
- Phylum: Arthropoda
- Clade: Pancrustacea
- Class: Insecta
- Order: Hymenoptera
- Family: Pteromalidae
- Subfamily: Pteromalinae
- Genus: Callitula; Spinola, 1811

= Callitula =

Genus of wasps

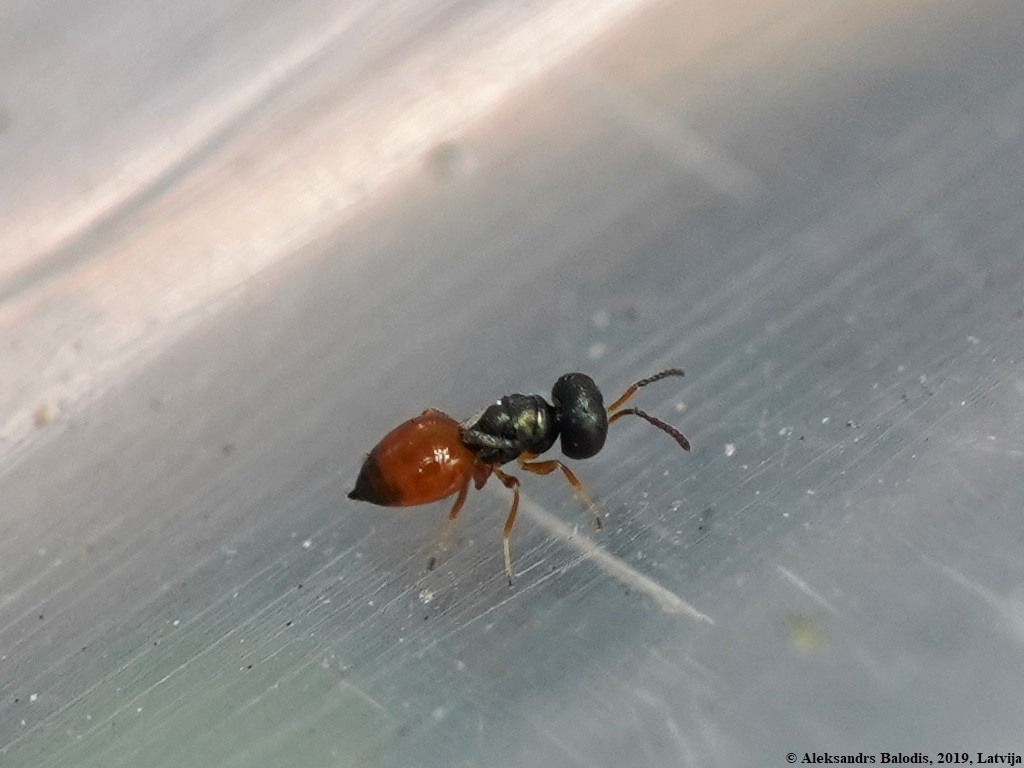
Callitula pyrrhogaster

Callitula is a genus of insects belonging to the family Pteromalidae.

The genus was first described by Spinola in 1811.

The genus has a cosmopolitan distribution.

Species:

- Callitula anguloclypea Sureshan, 2002
- Callitula bambusae Narendran & Jobiraj, 2001
- Callitula bicolor Spinola, 1811
- Callitula ferrierei (Bouček, 1964)
- Callitula peethapada Narendran & Mohana, 2001
- Callitula pyrrhogaster (Walker, 1833)
- Callitula travancorensis Sureshan, 2002
