= Muscidifurax =

Scientific classification
- Kingdom: Animalia
- Phylum: Arthropoda
- Class: Insecta
- Order: Hymenoptera
- Family: Pteromalidae
- Subfamily: Pteromalinae
- Genus: Muscidifurax; Girault & Sanders, 1910

Synonyms
- Smeagolia Hedqvist, 1973

Genus of parasitoid wasps

Muscidifurax is a genus of parasitoid wasps belonging to the family Pteromalidae.

The genus has almost cosmopolitan distribution.

== Species ==
- Muscidifurax adanacus Doganlar, 2007
- Muscidifurax neoraptorellus Xiao & Zhou, 2018
- Muscidifurax raptor Girault & Sanders, 1910
- Muscidifurax raptorellus Kogan & Legner, 1970
- Muscidifurax raptoroides Kogan & Legner, 1970
- Muscidifurax similadanacus Xiao & Zhou, 2018
- Muscidifurax sinesensilla Xiao & Zhou, 2018
- Muscidifurax uniraptor Kogan & Legner, 1970
- Muscidifurax zaraptor Kogan & Legner, 1970
