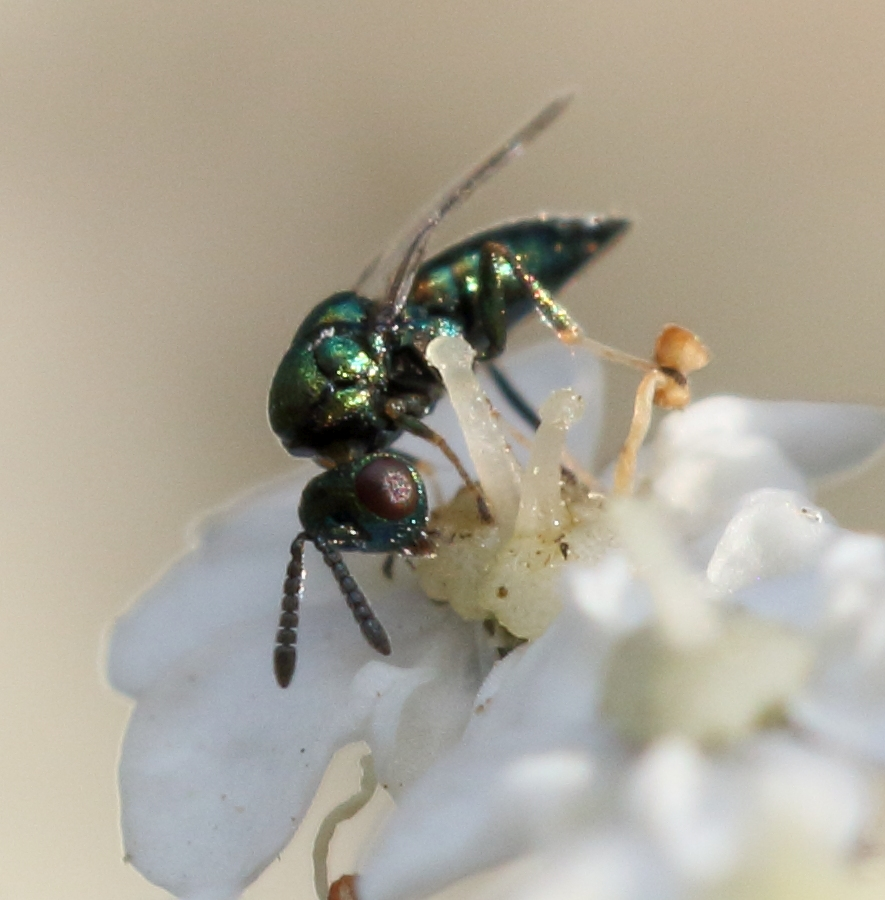
- Systasis sp.

Scientific classification
- Kingdom: Animalia
- Phylum: Arthropoda
- Clade: Pancrustacea
- Class: Insecta
- Order: Hymenoptera
- Superfamily: Chalcidoidea
- Family: Systasidae

= Systasidae =

Family of wasps

Systasidae is a family of chalcidoid wasps found worldwide. Members of the family are parasitoid, mostly parasitizing the gall-forming flies Agromyzidae and Cecidomyiidae, however hosts from other orders such as Coleoptera and Lepidoptera have been recorded.

== Description ==
Small (body length 0.6–3.0 mm) dark, bronze or metallic green wasps. They have a very unusual mesofurcal pit placement, which is placed between mesocoxal insertions.

== Taxonomy ==
The genera currently included in the family were originally placed under Pteromalidae. In 2022, the family was described based on an analysis of a combination of molecular, morphological, and life history data. Systasidae contains the following subfamilies and genera with a total of 81 species:

- Systasinae
  - Semiotellus
  - Systasis
- Trisecodinae
  - Trisecodes
