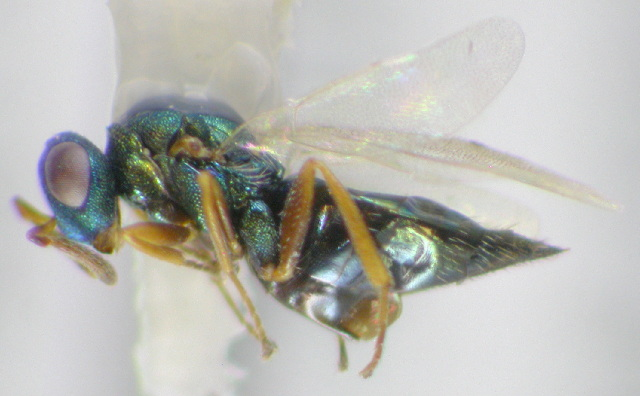
- Point-mounted specimen of Mesopolobus verditer

Scientific classification
- Kingdom: Animalia
- Phylum: Arthropoda
- Clade: Pancrustacea
- Class: Insecta
- Order: Hymenoptera
- Family: Pteromalidae
- Subfamily: Pteromalinae
- Genus: Mesopolobus; Westwood, 1833

= Mesopolobus =

Genus of insects

Mesopolobus is a genus of insects belonging to the family Pteromalidae. The genus has cosmopolitan distribution. This genus has a variety of life histories, with the majority of species being parasites of pupae.

Species:

- Mesopolobus adrianae Gijswijt, 1990
- Mesopolobus aeneus (Masi, 1924)
- Mesopolobus aequus (Walker)
- Mesopolobus agropyricola Rosen, 1960
- Mesopolobus aspilus (Walker, 1835)
- Mesopolobus beilingicus Sun & Xiao, 2016
- Mesopolobus equivenae Sun & Xiao, 2016
