= Miscogaster =

Scientific classification
- Kingdom: Animalia
- Phylum: Arthropoda
- Class: Insecta
- Order: Hymenoptera
- Family: Pteromalidae
- Subfamily: Miscogastrinae
- Tribe: Miscogastrini
- Genus: Miscogaster; Walker, 1833

Species
- Several, including: Miscogaster elegans; Miscogaster rufipes

Genus of wasps

Miscogaster is a genus of chalcid wasps.
