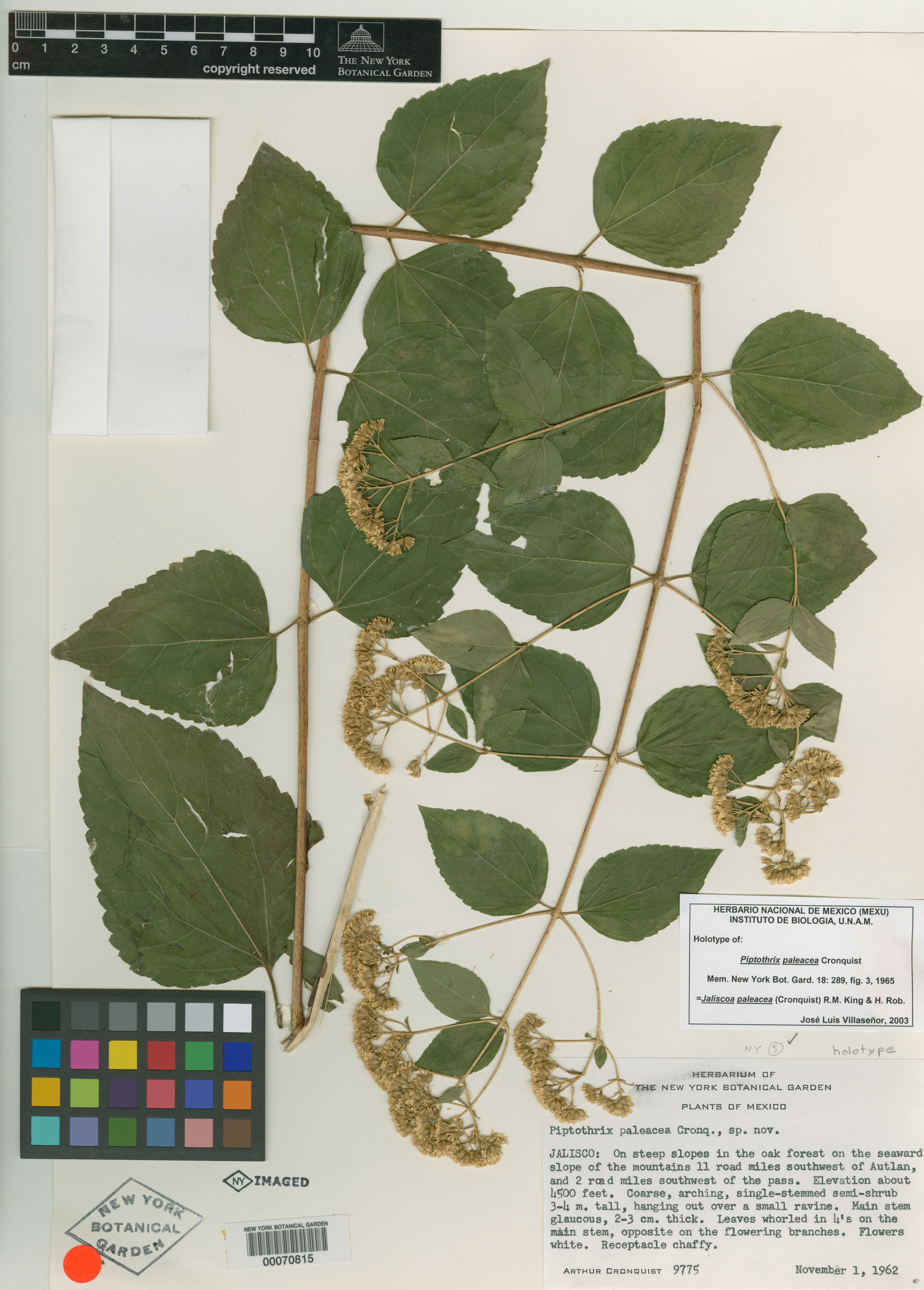

Scientific classification
- Kingdom: Plantae
- Clade: Tracheophytes
- Clade: Angiosperms
- Clade: Eudicots
- Clade: Asterids
- Order: Asterales
- Family: Asteraceae
- Subfamily: Asteroideae
- Tribe: Eupatorieae
- Genus: Jaliscoa; S.Wats.

= Jaliscoa (plant) =

Genus of flowering plants

Jaliscoa is a genus of Mexican flowering plants in the family Asteraceae.

The genus is named for the State of Jalisco in western Mexico.

Species

- Jaliscoa goldmanii (B.L.Rob.) R.M.King & H.Rob. - Jalisco, Durango, Chihuahua
- Jaliscoa paleacea (Cronquist) R.M.King & H.Rob. - Jalisco
- Jaliscoa pringlei S.Watson - Jalisco, Morelos, Guerrero, Michoacán
