= Hobbya =

Scientific classification
- Kingdom: Animalia
- Phylum: Arthropoda
- Class: Insecta
- Order: Hymenoptera
- Family: Pteromalidae
- Subfamily: Pteromalinae
- Tribe: Pteromalini
- Genus: Hobbya; Delucchi, 1957
- Species: H. stenonotus

Binomial name
- Hobbya stenonotus (Ratzeburg, 1848)

Synonyms
- Pteromalus stenonotus Ratzeburg, 1848; Etroxys collaris Thomson, 1878; Cecidostiba collaris (Thomson, 1878); Eutelus stenonotus (Ratzeburg, 1848); Hobbya stenonota (Ratzeburg, 1848); Hobbya kollari Askew, 1959

Monotypic genus of wasp

Hobbya is a genus of parasitoid wasp in the tribe Pteromalini. The genus is monotypic, with the singular species Hobbya stenonotus.

== Description ==
Hobbya stenonotus is a hyperparasitoid of Torymus cingulatus, which itself is a parasitoid of various species of gall wasps (Cynipidae).

The species is identifiable among other similar Pteromalidae by the deep excision on the clypeus, striation reaching from the clypeus to the base of the antennae, and by the length of the forewing's marginal vein which is around twice as long as the stigmal vein.
