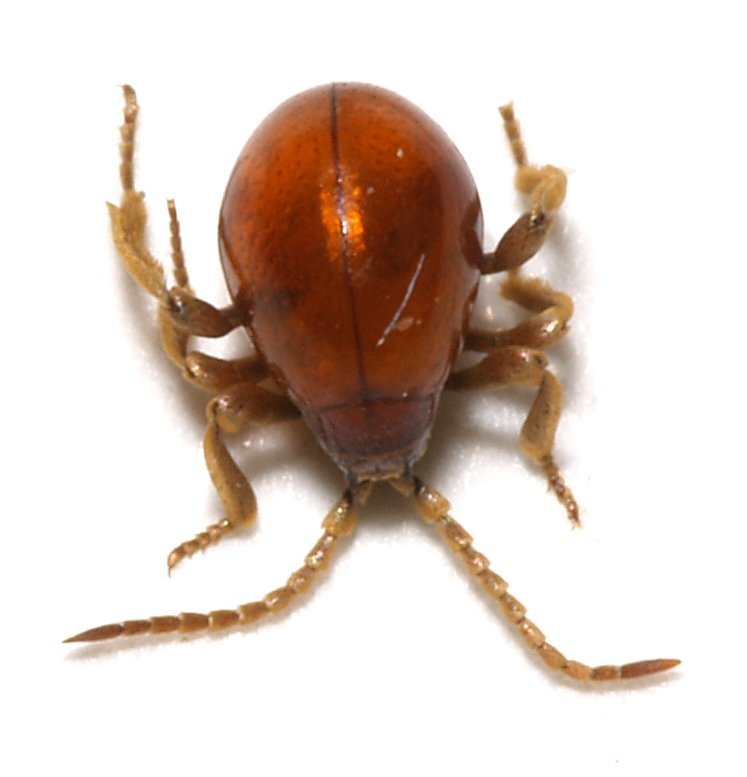
- Gibbium psylloides

Scientific classification
- Kingdom: Animalia
- Phylum: Arthropoda
- Class: Insecta
- Order: Coleoptera
- Suborder: Polyphaga
- Family: Ptinidae
- Tribe: Gibbiini
- Genus: Gibbium; Scopoli, 1777

Species
- see text

= Gibbium =

Genus of beetles

Gibbium is a genus of beetles in the family Ptinidae.

Species and distribution:

- Gibbium aequinoctiale – Cosmopolitan distribution
- Gibbium psylloides – Palearctic, Southeast Asia, North Africa
