= Chlorocytus =

Scientific classification
- Kingdom: Animalia
- Phylum: Arthropoda
- Clade: Pancrustacea
- Class: Insecta
- Order: Hymenoptera
- Family: Pteromalidae
- Genus: Chlorocytus; Graham, 1956

Type species
- Pteromalus pulchripes Walker, 1836

Synonyms
- Legolasia Hedqvist, 1974

Genus of wasps

Chlorocytus is a genus of wasps belonging to the family Pteromalidae.

The species of this genus are found in Europe, North America, Asia, and Southern Africa.

== Records in Mexico ==
The pteromalid wasp Chlorocytus languriae is reported for the first time in Mexico (Ashmead, 1896) as a parasitoid of the soybean petiole borer (Languria mozardi), in soybean. The state of Tamaulipas and San Luis Potosí are the southernmost places where it was recorded.

== Species ==
Species within the genus Chlorocytus include:

- Chlorocytus agropyri (Graham, 1965)
- Chlorocytus alticornis (Graham, 1984)
- Chlorocytus analis (Ashmead, 1895)
- Chlorocytus breviscapus Graham, 1965
- Chlorocytus circumcinctus Xiao & Huang, 2000 - found in China
- Chlorocytus comatus Xiao & Huang, 2000- found in China
- Chlorocytus deschampsiae Graham, 1965
- Chlorocytus dinotiscoides (Hedqvist, 1974)
- Chlorocytus indicus - found in India
- Chlorocytus harmolitae Boucek, 1957
- Chlorocytus jaculatorius Xiao & Huang, 2000 - found in China
- Chlorocytus koponeni Graham, 1990
- Chlorocytus languriae Ashmead, 1896
- Chlorocytus leleji (Tselikh, 2016)
- Chlorocytus murriensis Graham - found in India
- Chlorocytus spicatus (Walker, 1835)
- Chlorocytus undulatus Xiao & Huang, 2000 - found in China
- Chlorocytus xanthopus (Cameron, 1906) - found in India
