= Robertsia =

Scientific classification
- Kingdom: Animalia
- Phylum: Arthropoda
- Class: Insecta
- Order: Hymenoptera
- Family: Agaonidae
- Genus: Robertsia; Bouček, 1988

Genus of wasps

Robertsia is a genus of fig wasps in the family Pteromalidae, native to Papua New Guinea.
