= Spinosa =

Spinosa may refer to:

- Viviana Spinosa (born 1984), Colombian digital artist
- Michel Spinosa (born 1963), French director and screenwriter

== See also ==
- Spinoza (disambiguation)
- Espinoza (disambiguation)
