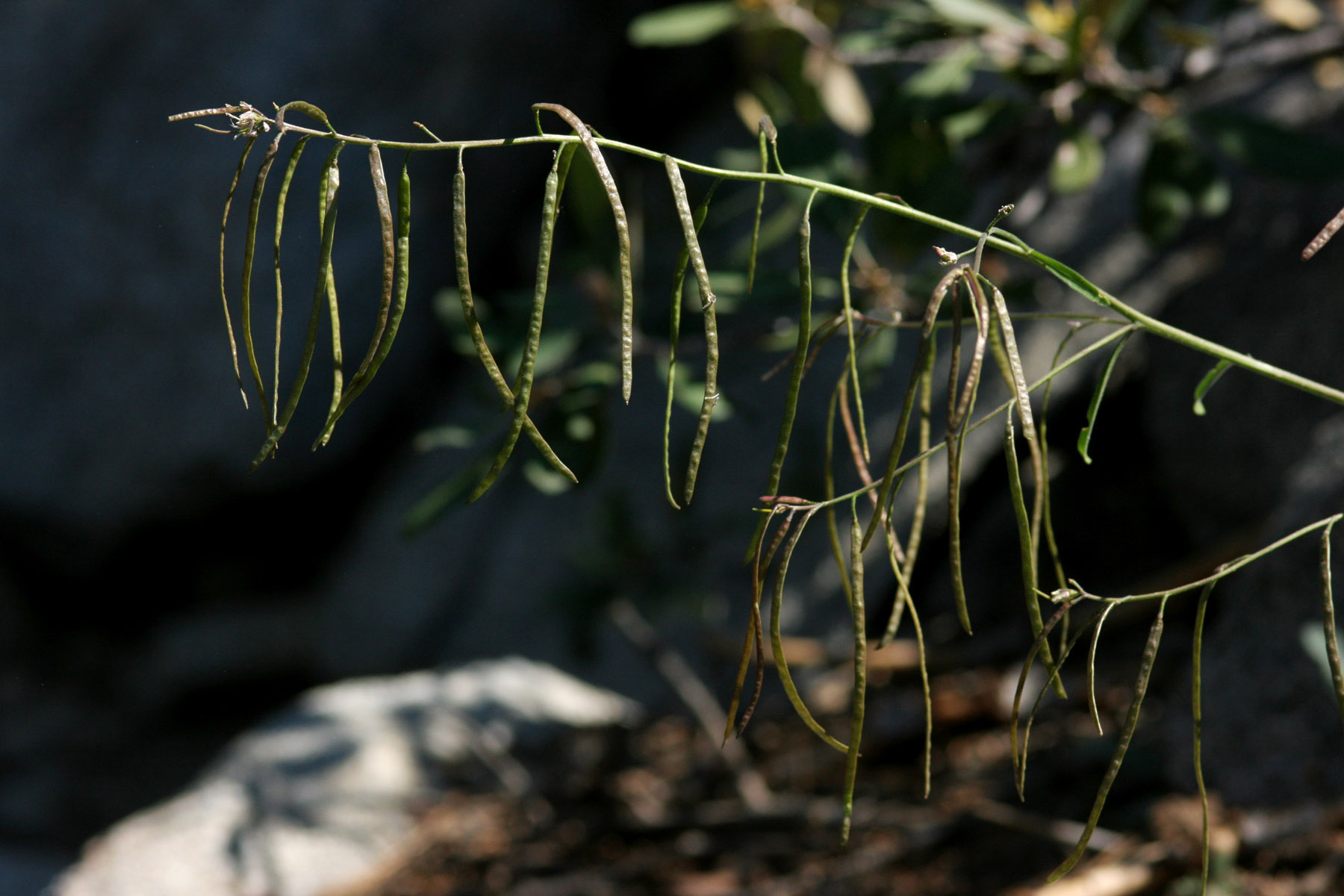

Scientific classification
- Kingdom: Plantae
- Clade: Embryophytes
- Clade: Tracheophytes
- Clade: Angiosperms
- Clade: Eudicots
- Clade: Rosids
- Order: Brassicales
- Family: Brassicaceae
- Genus: Yosemitea; P.J.Alexander & Windham
- Species: Y. repanda

Binomial name
- Yosemitea repanda (S.Watson) P.J.Alexander & Windham

Synonyms
- Arabis repanda S.Watson (1876) (basionym); Arabis repanda var. greenei Jeps.; Arabis repanda var. typica Rollins; Boechera repanda (S.Watson) Al-Shehbaz; Boechera repanda var. greenei (Jeps.) D.W.Taylor

= Yosemitea repanda =

Genus of flowering plants

Yosemitea is a monotypic genus of flowering plants belonging to the family Brassicaceae. The only species is Yosemitea repanda, commonly known as Yosemite rockcress. Synonyms include Arabis repanda S. Watson and Boechera repanda (S. Watson) Al-Shehbaz.

It is native to California and Nevada in the southwestern United States. It grows in the Sierra Nevada, high North Coast Ranges, and the western Transverse, San Gabriel, San Bernardino, and San Jacinto mountains of southern California, from 1400 to 3600 meters elevation. Typical habitats include rock outcrops, talus slopes, gravelly soil in meadows, and open pine forest.
