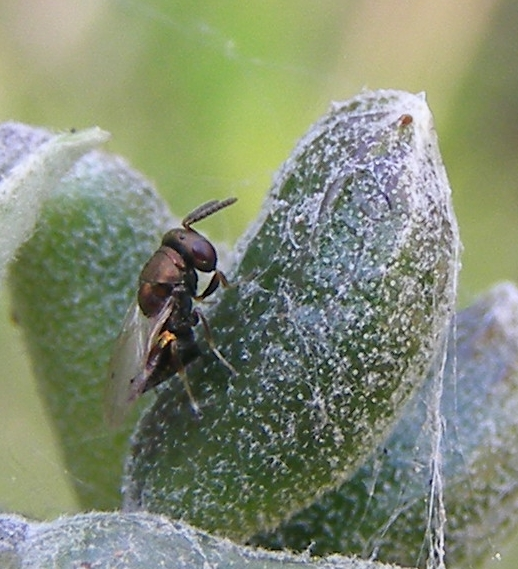

Scientific classification
- Kingdom: Animalia
- Phylum: Arthropoda
- Clade: Pancrustacea
- Class: Insecta
- Order: Hymenoptera
- Family: Pteromalidae
- Subfamily: Pteromalinae
- Genus: Pteromalus; Swederus, 1795

= Pteromalus =

Genus of wasps

Pteromalus is a genus of pteromalid wasps in the family Pteromalidae. There are at least 430 described species in the genus Pteromalus.

== See also ==
- List of Pteromalus species
