= Yosemitea latifrons =

Scientific classification
- Kingdom: Animalia
- Phylum: Arthropoda
- Class: Insecta
- Order: Hymenoptera
- Family: Pteromalidae
- Genus: Yosemitea; Boucek, 1993
- Species: Y. latifrons

Binomial name
- Yosemitea latifrons Boucek, 1993

Species of wasp

Yosemitea is a genus of wasps belonging to the family Pteromalidae, containing a single described species from the United States, Yosemitea latifrons.
