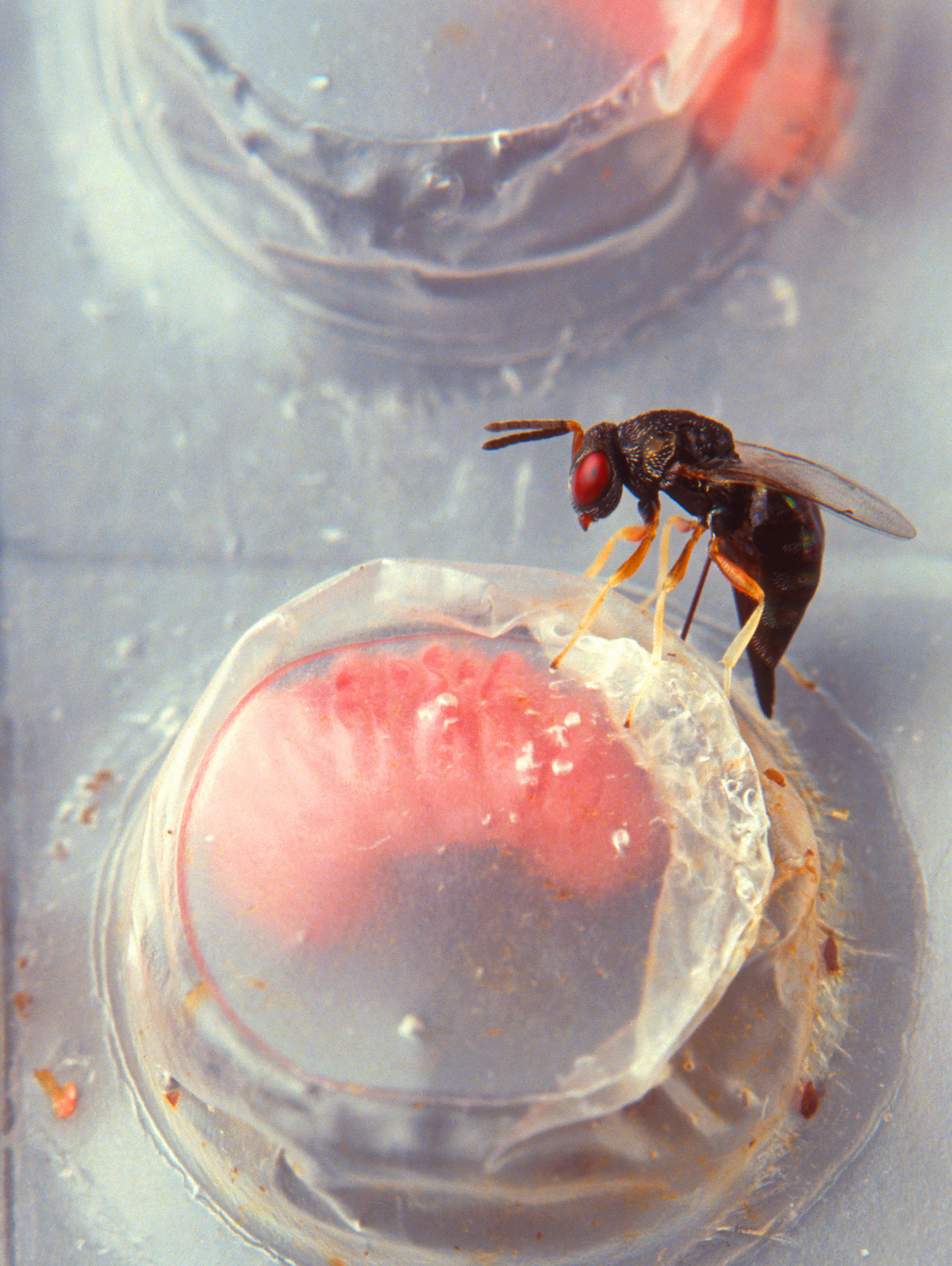
- Catolaccus grandis

Scientific classification
- Kingdom: Animalia
- Phylum: Arthropoda
- Clade: Pancrustacea
- Class: Insecta
- Order: Hymenoptera
- Superfamily: Chalcidoidea
- Family: Pteromalidae; Dalman, 1820

Subfamilies
- Many (see text)

= Pteromalidae =

Pteromalidae Temporal range: Aptian–Present

Family of wasps

The Pteromalidae are a large family of wasps, the majority being parasitoids of other insects. They are found throughout the world in virtually all habitats, and many are important as biological control agents. The oldest known fossil is known from the Early Cretaceous.

Prior to 2022, the subfamily-level divisions of the family were highly contentious and unstable, and the family was thought to be "artificial", composed of numerous, distantly related groups (polyphyletic). In essence, a "pteromalid" was any member of the Chalcidoidea that had five-segmented tarsi and did not have the defining features of any of the remaining families with five-segmented tarsi.

In 2022, the Pteromalidae was split into 24 families.

== Description ==
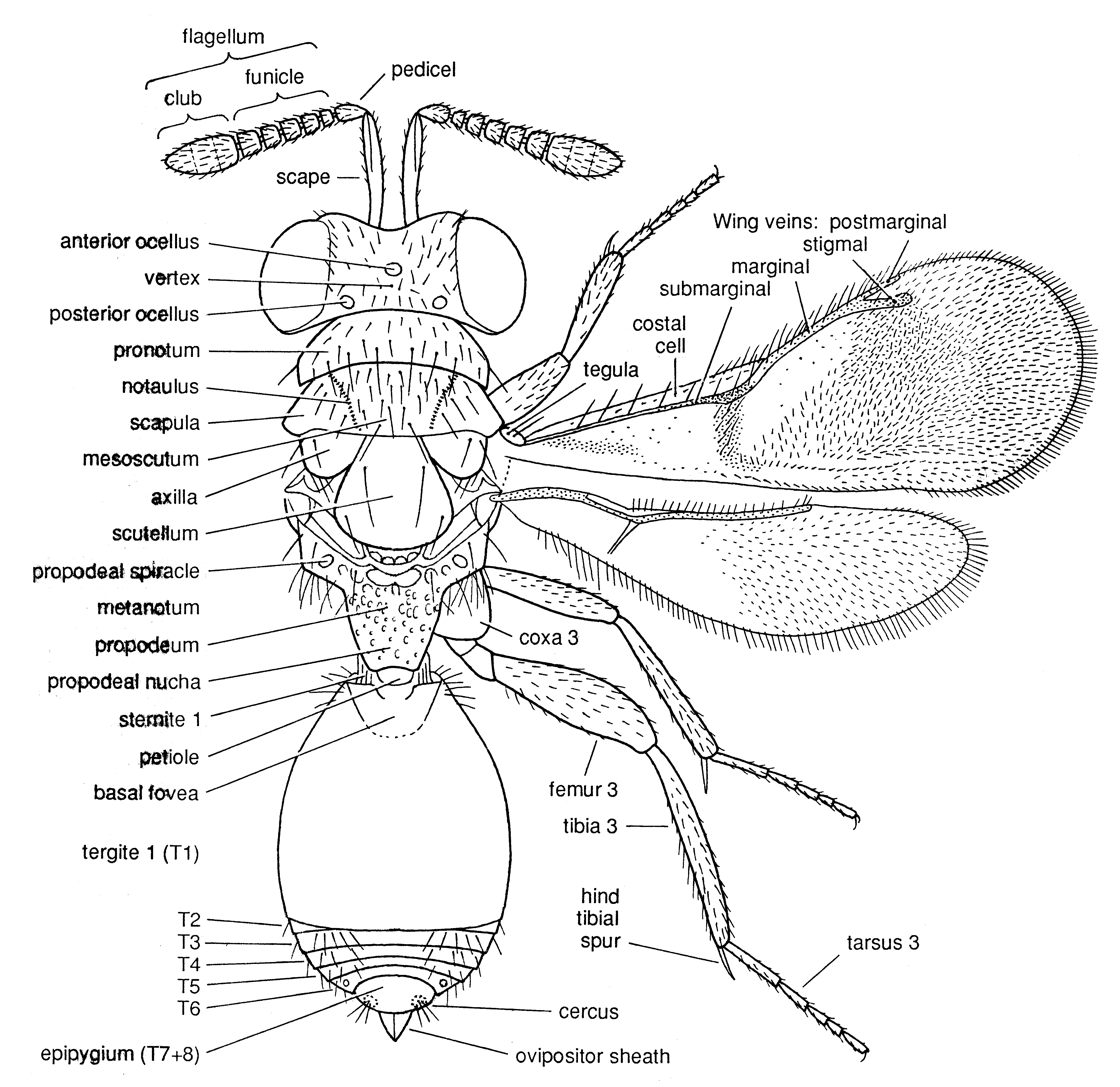
Morphology terminology

Pteromalidae are usually metallic chalcidoids of varying body size (from 1–48 mm long) and build (slender to quite robust), with the tarsi of the fore and hind legs consisting of five segments. They carry antennae consisting of eight to thirteen segments (including up to 3 anelli); in fully winged forms have in the fore wing a marginal vein that is at least several times longer than broad; very often have well-developed postmarginal and stigmal veins, although these are occasionally quite short; and nearly always have a distinct speculum.

== Ecology ==
The life strategies of the species in this family vary greatly. There are both solitary and gregarious species, living outside (ectoparasitoid) or inside their prey (endoparasitoid), koinobionts and idiobionts, primary parasitoids and hyperparasitoids and even predators that kill and consume the prey immediately; they also include fig wasp genera. Because of their parasitoid nature, wasps of this family are often used as biological control agents for destructive pests such as American serpentine leafminers. Pteromalus cassotis is a parasitoid of the monarch butterfly.

== Subfamilies, tribes, and genera ==
Historically, as many as 33 subfamilies of Pteromalidae were recognised. In this arrangement, and other similar ones, Pteromalidae had been recognized as paraphyletic, with many of these subfamilies and their genera being only distantly related. A large body of molecular and morphological research was considered in a new classification of these taxa, published in 2022; many taxa were removed from Pteromalidae and placed in other chalcidoid families, mostly new ones created from former subfamilies, leaving Pteromalidae with only 8 subfamilies.

The results of Burks et al. suggested the following arrangement of the remaining genera (in subfamilies and tribes):

=== Colotrechninae ===
- Amerostenini: Amerostenus, Errolia, Glorimontana, Yrka;
- Colotrechnini: Baridobius, Bofuria, Bomburia, Cameronella, Colotrechnus, Dipachystigma, Dvalinia, Elachertodomyia, Pachyneuronella, Podivna, Uriellopteromalus, Uzka;
- Divnini: Divna;
- Trigonoderopsini: Bugacia, Trigonoderopsis.

=== Erixestinae ===
- Erixestus.

=== Miscogastrinae ===
- Diconocarini: Diconocara;
- Miscogastrini: Collentis, Drailea, Glyphognathus, Lamprotatus, Miscogaster, Neoskeloceras, Paralamprotatus, Seladerma, Sphaeripalpus, Stictomischus, Telepsogina, Thektogaster, Tumor, Xestomnaster;
- Sphegigastrini: Acroclisis, Ammeia, Andersena, Ardilea, Bairamlia, Bubekia, Bubekiana, Callicarolynia, Callimerismus, Ceratetra, Cryptoprymna, Cyrtogaster, Haliplogeton, Halticoptera, Harrizia, Kazina, Maorita, Mauleus, Merismus, Notoglyptus, Notoprymna, Novitzkyanus, Paracroclisis, Ploskana, Polstonia, Rhicnocoelia, Schimitschekia, Sorosina, Sphegigaster, Syntomopus, Thinodytes, Toxeuma, Tricyclomischus, Trigonogastrella, Vespita.

=== Ormocerinae ===
- Blascoa, Cecidoxenus, Monazosa, Nodisoplata, Ormocerus.

=== Metasteninae ===
- Acroclisoides, Amblyharma, Austroterobia, Canada, Coruna, Euneura, Fusta, Goidanichium, Inkaka, Metastenus, Nazgulia, Neotoxeumorpha, Oomara, Oricoruna, Ottaria, Pachycrepoideus, Pachyneuron, Parabruchobius, Platecrizotes, Teasienna, Toxeumorpha.

=== Pteromalinae ===
- Otitesellini: Adiyodiella, Apocrypta, Arachonia, Bouceka, Comptoniella, Crossogaster, Diaziella, Dobunabaa, Eujacobsonia, Grandiana, Grasseiana, Guadalia, Lipothymus, Marginalia, Micranisa, Micrognathophora, Otitesella, Philosycella, Philosycus, Philoverdance, Philotrypesis, Robertsia, Seres, Sycoecus, Sycoryctes, Sycoscapter, Walkerella, Watshamiella;
- Pteromalini: Ablaxia, Abomalus, Acaenacis, Acroclisella, Acroclisissa, Acroclypa, Acrocormus, Aepocerus, Afropsilocera, Aggelma, Agiommatus, Aiemea, Allocricellius, Alticornis, Amandia, Amblypachus, Amphidocius, Angulifrons, Anisopteromalus, Ankaratrella, Anogmoides, Anogmus, Anorbanus, Apelioma, Apsilocera, Apycnetron, Arachnopteromalus, Arriva, Arthrolytus, Asoka, Atrichomalus, Boharticus, Bonitoa, Boucekina, Brachycaudonia, Bupronotum, Caenacis, Caenocrepis, Calliprymna, Callitula, Canberrana, Capellia, Catolaccus, Cecidolampa, Cecidostiba, Cheiropachus, Chlorocytus, Chrysoglyphe, Coelopisthia, Conigastrus, Conomorium, Cratomus, Critogaster, Cyclogastrella, Cyrtophagoides, Cyrtoptyx, Dasyneurophaga, Delisleia, Delucchia, Dibrachoides, Dibrachys, Diglochis, Dimachus, Dinarmoides, Dinarmolaelaps, Dinarmus, Dineuticida, Dinotiscus, Dinotoides, Diourbelia, Dirhicnus, Doganlaria, Dorcatomophaga, Elderia, Endomychobius, Epanogmus, Epicatolaccus, Epipteromalus, Erdoesina, Erythromalus, Eulonchetron, Eumacepolus, Eurydinota, Eurydinoteloides, Eurydinotomorpha, Euteloida, Ezgia, Fedelia, Ficicola, Fijita, Frena, Gbelcia, Genangula, Globimesosoma, Grissellium, Guancheria, Gugolzia, Guinea, Guolina, Gyrinophagus, Habritella, Habritys, Habromalina, Halomalus, Halticopterella, Halticopteroides, Helocasis, Heterandrium, Heteroprymna, Heteroschema, Hillerita, Hlavka, Hobbya, Holcaeus, Homoporus, Huberina, Hypopteromalus, Ischyroptyx, Isocyrtella, Isocyrtus, Isoplatoides, Jaliscoa, Kaleva, Klabonosa, Kratka, Kukua, Kumarella, Lampoterma, Lariophagus, Laticlypa, Lenka, Leodamus, Leptomeraporus, Licteria, Lomonosoffiella, Lonchetron, Longinucha, Lyrcus, Lysirina, Lyubana, Makaronesa, Mazinawa, Megadicylus, Merallus, Meraporus, Merismoclea, Merismomorpha, Merisus, Mesopolobus, Metacolus, Meximalus, Mimencyrtus, Mirekia, Miristhma, Mokrzeckia, Monoksa, Morodora, Muscidifurax, Nadelaia, Narendrella, Nasonia, Neanica, Nedinotus, Neocatolaccus, Neolyubana, Neopolycystus, Nephelomalus, Nikolskayana, Norbanus, Nuchata, Oaxa, Obalana, Olchon, Oniticellobia, Ottawita, Oxyharma, Oxysychus, Pandelus, Panstenon, Paracarotomus, Paradinarmus, Paraiemea, Paroxyharma, Pegopus, Peridesmia, Perilampidea, Perniphora, Pestra, Pezilepsis, Phaenocytus, Platneptis, Platypteromalus, Procallitula, Propicroscytus, Propodeia, Pseudanogmus, Pseudetroxys, Pseudocatolaccus, Psilocera, Psilonotus, Psychophagoides, Psychophagus, Pterapicus, Pterisemoppa, Pteromalus, Pterosemigastra, Pterosemopsis, Ptinocida, Pycnetron, Quercanus, Rakosina, Raspela, Rhaphitelus, Rhopalicus, Rohatina, Roptrocerus, Sceptrothelys, Schizonotus, Sedma, Sigynia, Sisyridivora, Spaniopus, Sphegigastrella, Sphegipterosema, Sphegipterosemella, Spilomalus, Spintherus, Spodophagus, Staurothyreus, Stenetra, Stenomalina, Stenoselma, Stichocrepis, Stinoplus, Strejcekia, Synedrus, Systellogaster, Szelenyinus, Tachingousa, Tanina, Tanzanicesa, Termolampa, Thureonella, Tomicobia, Toxeumella, Toxeumelloides, Trichargyrus, Trichokaleva, Trichomalopsis, Trichomalus, Tricolas, Trimeromicrus, Trinotiscus, Tritneptis, Trjapitzinia, Trychnosoma, Tsela, Uniclypea, Urolepis, Usubaia, Veltrusia, Vrestovia, Xiphydriophagus, Yanchepia, Yosemitea, Zdenekiana.

=== Sycophaginae ===
- Anidarnes, Conidarnes, Eukoebelea, Idarnes, Neoeukobelea, Pseudidarnes, Sycidiphaga, Sycophaga.

=== Trigonoderinae ===
- Erdoesia, Eutelisca, Gastracanthus, Janssoniella, Miscogasteriella, Neolelaps, Ogloblinisca, Platygerrhus, Plutothrix, Trigonoderus.

=== Incertae sedis (unplaced to subfamily) ===
Calolelaps, Hemitrichus, Ksenoplata, Mesolelaps, Stictolelaps, Yusufia.
