= Wonderboom =

Wonderboom (meaning "wonder tree" in Afrikaans) may refer to:

Wonderboom locations within South Africa
- Wonderboom (tree) a particular grove of Ficus salicifolia north of Pretoria, and eponym of:
  - Ficus salicifolia, a species of fig
  - Wonderboom Nature Reserve, containing the grove
  - Wonderboom, Pretoria, a suburb just north of the nature reserve
  - Wonderboom South, Pretoria, a suburb south of the nature reserve
  - Wonderboom Airport, an airport in the region
- Die Wonderboom, an unusually shaped Boscia oleoides (Karoo shepherd's tree) beside the N9 at Willowmore, Eastern Cape
- Wonderboom (band), a South African rock band from Johannesburg
