= Wonderboom, Pretoria =

Wonderboom
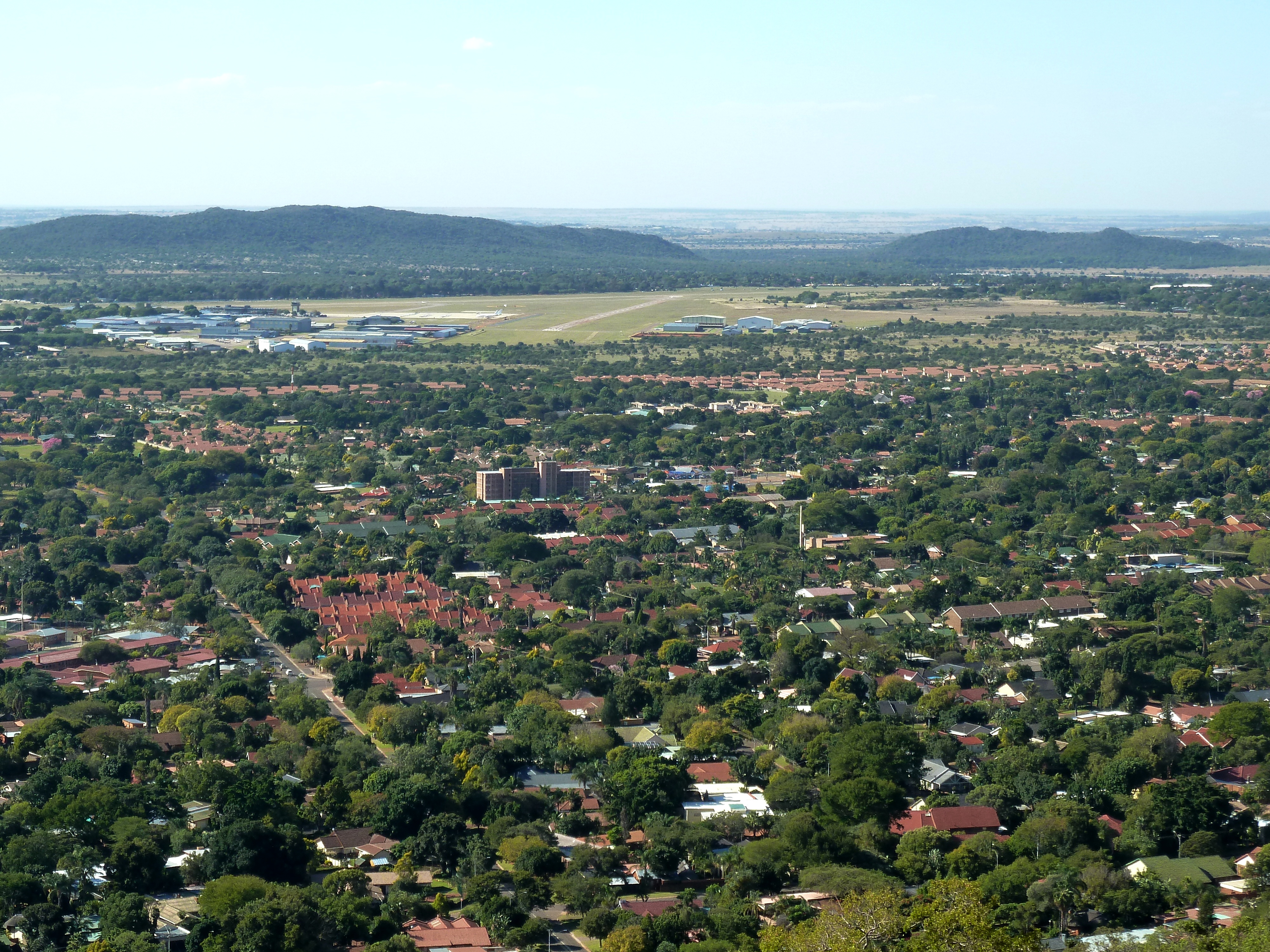
- The suburb in the foreground, with Wonderboom Airport beyond

- Location within Gauteng Location within South Africa
- Coordinates: 25°41′0″S 28°12′0″E
- Country: South Africa
- Province: Gauteng
- Municipality: City of Tshwane
- Main Place: Pretoria
- Named for: Wonderboom (tree)

Area
  - Total: 1.99 km^{2} (0.77 sq mi)

Population (2011)
  - Total: 4,692
  - Density: 2,360/km^{2} (6,110/sq mi)

Racial makeup (2011)
  - Black African: 7.5%
  - Coloured: 0.5%
  - Indian/Asian: 0.9%
  - White: 90.1%
  - Other: 1.0%

First languages (2011)
  - Afrikaans: 84.2%
  - English: 9.2%
  - Tswana: 1.2%
  - Northern Sotho: 1.2%
  - Other: 4.2%
- Time zone: UTC+2 (SAST)
- Postal code (street): 0182
- PO box: n/a
- Area code: 012

Wonderboom is a northern residential suburb of Pretoria, South Africa. The suburb includes the Wonderboom Nature Reserve site of the famous Wonderboom (Afrikaans for "Marvel tree" or "Wonder tree"), on the northern slopes of the Magaliesberg mountains, just east of the Apies River. Neighbouring suburbs are Annlin to the west, Sinoville to the north and east and Wonderboom South to the south.

Schools in the suburb include Hoërskool Wonderboom and Hoërskool Overkruin.
