= Sweet myrtle =

Sweet myrtle is a common name for several plants and may refer to:

- Acorus calamus, an herbaceous wetland plant with a broad distribution in the northern hemisphere
- Myrtus communis, a shrub native to southern Europe
