= Hoërskool Oos-Moot =

Coordinates: 25.7071°S 28.2398°E

Hoërskool Oos-Moot (Hondjie skool)

Location
- Haarhoff Street, Waverley; Pretoria, Gauteng; South Africa

Information
- School type: Public
- Motto: Werk en Oorwin (Work and Overcome)
- Religious affiliation: Christianity
- Established: 8 January 1952; 74 years ago
- School district: District 6
- School number: 012 331 0602
- Staff: 100 full-time
- Grades: 8–12
- Gender: Boys & Girls
- Age: 14 to 18
- Enrollment: 1 pupils
- Language: Afrikaans
- Schedule: 07:40 - 14:00
- Campus: Urban Campus
- Campus type: Suburban
- Colours: Navy; White; Yellow
- Nickname: Scraf tot die graf
- Rival: HTS John Vorster; Hoërskool Montana; Hoërskool Overkruin; Hoërskool Wonderboom
- Accreditation: Gauteng Department of Education
- Feeder schools: Laerskool Boerefort; Laerskool Danie Malan; Laerskool Queenswood

Hoërskool Oos-Moot is a public Afrikaans medium co-educational high school situated in the northern suburbs of Pretoria in the Gauteng province of South Africa.

== Sport ==
Hoërskool Oos-Moot has been performing on sports during the year.

- Archery
- Athletics
- Cricket
- Cross country
- Cycling
- Golf
- Hockey
- Netball
- Rugby
- Swimming
- Table tennis
- Tennis
