= Hoërskool Wonderboom =

Die Hoërskool Wonderboom
- Hoërskool Wonderboom school crest

Location
- Voortrekkersweg; Wonderboom-Suid; Pretoria, Gauteng; South Africa
- 25.69462°S 28.19899°E

Information
- School type: Public School
- Motto: Groei en Dien (Grow and Serve)
- Religious affiliation: Christianity
- Established: 1949; 77 years ago
- School district: District 4
- School number: +27 (012) 335 6806
- Headmaster: Mr Carl Schmahl
- Grades: 8–12
- Gender: Boys & Girls
- Enrollment: 1,150 pupils
- Language: Afrikaans
- Schedule: 07:30 - 14:00
- Hours in school day: 6h30 min
- Campus: Urban Campus
- Campus type: Suburban
- Colours: Gold; Green; White
- Nickname: Wonnies
- Rivals: Hoërskool Overkruin; Hoërskool Oos-Moot; HTS John Vorster
- Accreditation: Gauteng Department of Education
- Feeder schools: Laerskool Boerefort; Laerskool Mayville; Laerskool Wonderboom-Suid
- Website: www.wonnies.co.za

Die Hoërskool Wonderboom is a public Afrikaans medium co-educational high school situated in the suburb of Wonderboom South in Pretoria in the Gauteng province of South Africa, on the southern slopes of the Magaliesberg, The learners are known as the Wonnies

== Early history ==
In 1925 a commission headed by J. A. Friis started an action to establish a high school in the Moot. The former Department of Education was not inclined to an Afrikaans high school building.

In 1928 the then MEC for Education, Mr. Michael Brink, made a promise for a new Afrikaans high school. Up until 1943, the matter was still on ice. A new Afrikaans high school was not on the agenda of the Department of Education. Mr. Michael Brink again decided to undertake the matter further.

On June 14, 1944, a site was recommended and approved on February 13, 1946. This area was the now famous, southern slope of the Magaliesberg east of Voortrekker Road. In November 1946 the first sod was dug by Mr. Michael Brink.

Mr. J Dey was the architect, Mr.. J D Verhoewe the contractor and Mr. C. Morgan, chairman of the action committee.

Eventually, after many years, the first Afrikaans High School was established in the Moot, under the name Michael Brink Hoër. A year later, on June 10, 1950, the Administrator of the Transvaal announced that: the school will from now on be known as Die Hoërskool Wonderboom. It was the first step in the direction of the rich traditions, beautiful grounds and outstanding features of Hoërskool Wonderboom, as it is known today.

"Grow and Serve" is the motto of the school upheld throughout the past 58 years. This motto and badge were introduced at the end of 1950. The school song was the next milestone. Mr. J. A. van der Walt, a teacher, was the author of the lyrics and the famous Stephan Eyssen wrote the music. The school song was officially inaugurated at the matric farewell in 1953.

The school's number of pupils had increased rapidly, and already in 1955 new building additions were necessary. In 1964 construction started on the new wing and the larger hall and completed on 16 January 1967.This also included some alterations to existing buildings including the media center.

In 1974 the new pavilion was built, which, with its roof was a big improvement. In addition, the sports fields underwent a metamorphosis.

In January 1949 Mr. Van Vuuren, a retired former headmaster took the reins of the new school in his capable hands. In 1950 dr. J. C. Otto was appointed the first permanent headmaster. He was later the Mayor of Pretoria. He was succeeded in 1962 by Mr. S. H. Friis, son of Mr. J. A. Friis under whose leadership the action began for a new Afrikaans high school. After 14 years, in 1976, Mr. C. Schutte was appointed his successor, and only 10 years later in 1986, D.J. Ferreira took up the reins. Dr. S.T. van Wyk was appointed on 1 November 1994, and his career as headmaster of Hoërskool Wonderboom lasted for a fruitful 17 years. Dr S.T. van Wyk retired in 2016, with Mr. Marius Lezar taking his place and starting his first year as headmaster in 2017. Since taking over as headmaster the school has improved significantly. Infrastructure have been maintained properly and improved. The popularity of Wonderboom Highschool in the Moot area increases yearly, which is evident in their student growth. In 2022, the "Wonnies" (as the school are fondly known), won the Pretoria Schools Interhigh C-Bond athletics championship by quite a big margin. As from 2023 they will participate in the Pretoria Schools Interhigh B-Bond athletic championship.

== Sports ==
Die Hoërskool Wonderboom has been performing very well at sports during the year.

- Archery
- Athletics
- Chess
- Cricket
- Cross country
- Cycling
- Golf
- Hockey
- Netball (Girls)
- Rugby (Boys)
- Shooting
- Softball
- Swimming
- Tennis
- Table Tennis
- E-Sports
