= Tibesti–Jebel Uweinat montane xeric woodlands =

Desert ecoregion in Africa

Tibesti-Jebel Uweinat montane xeric woodlands
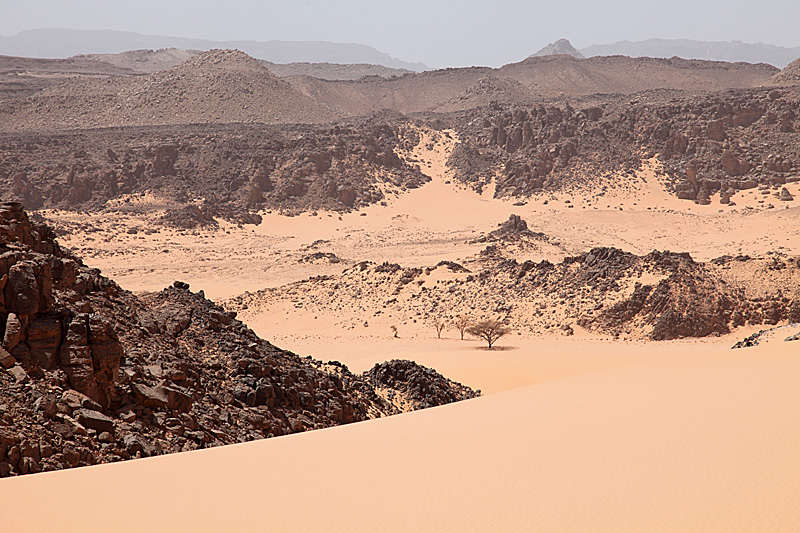
- Jebel Uweinat

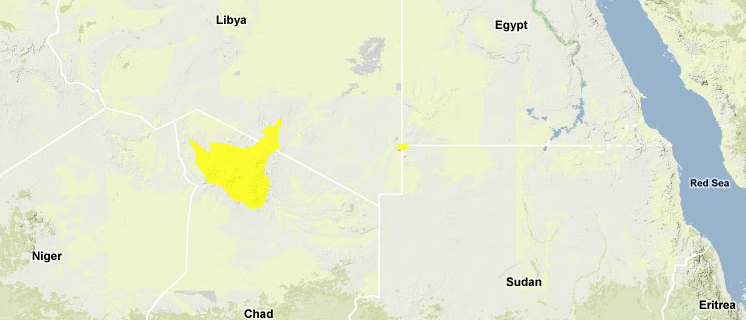
- Location of the ecoregion

Ecology
- Realm: Palearctic
- Biome: deserts and xeric shrublands
- Borders: Sahara Desert

Geography
- Area: 82,013 km^{2} (31,665 mi^{2})
- Countries: Chad; Egypt; Libya; Sudan

Conservation
- Conservation status: Relatively stable/intact
- Protected: 245 km² (>1%)

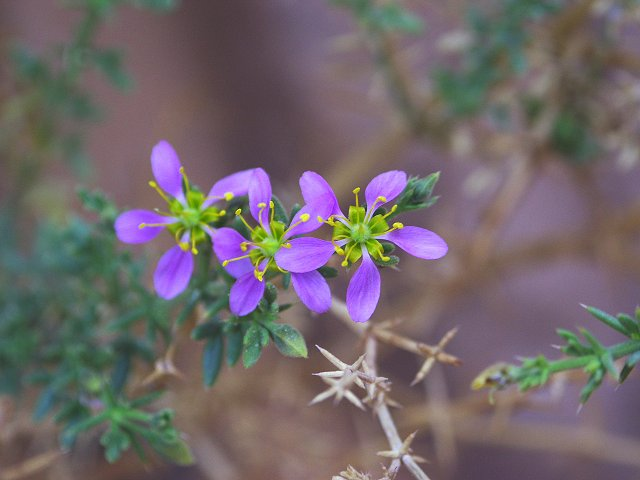
Fagonia arabica on Jebel Uweinat

The Tibesti-Jebel Uweinat montane xeric woodlands is a deserts and xeric shrublands ecoregion in the eastern Sahara. The woodlands ecoregion occupies two separate highland regions, covering portions of northern Chad, southwestern Egypt, southern Libya, and northwestern Sudan.

== Setting ==
The ecoregion covers 82,200 square kilometers (31,700 sq mi) in the volcanic Tibesti Mountains of Chad and Libya, and 1932-m peak of Jebel Uweinat on the border of Egypt, Libya, and Sudan. The climate is arid and subtropical, but can reach 0°C at the highest elevations during the winter. Rainfall is irregular but more regular than the surrounding desert and many of the lower wadis are watered by rain which falls higher up.

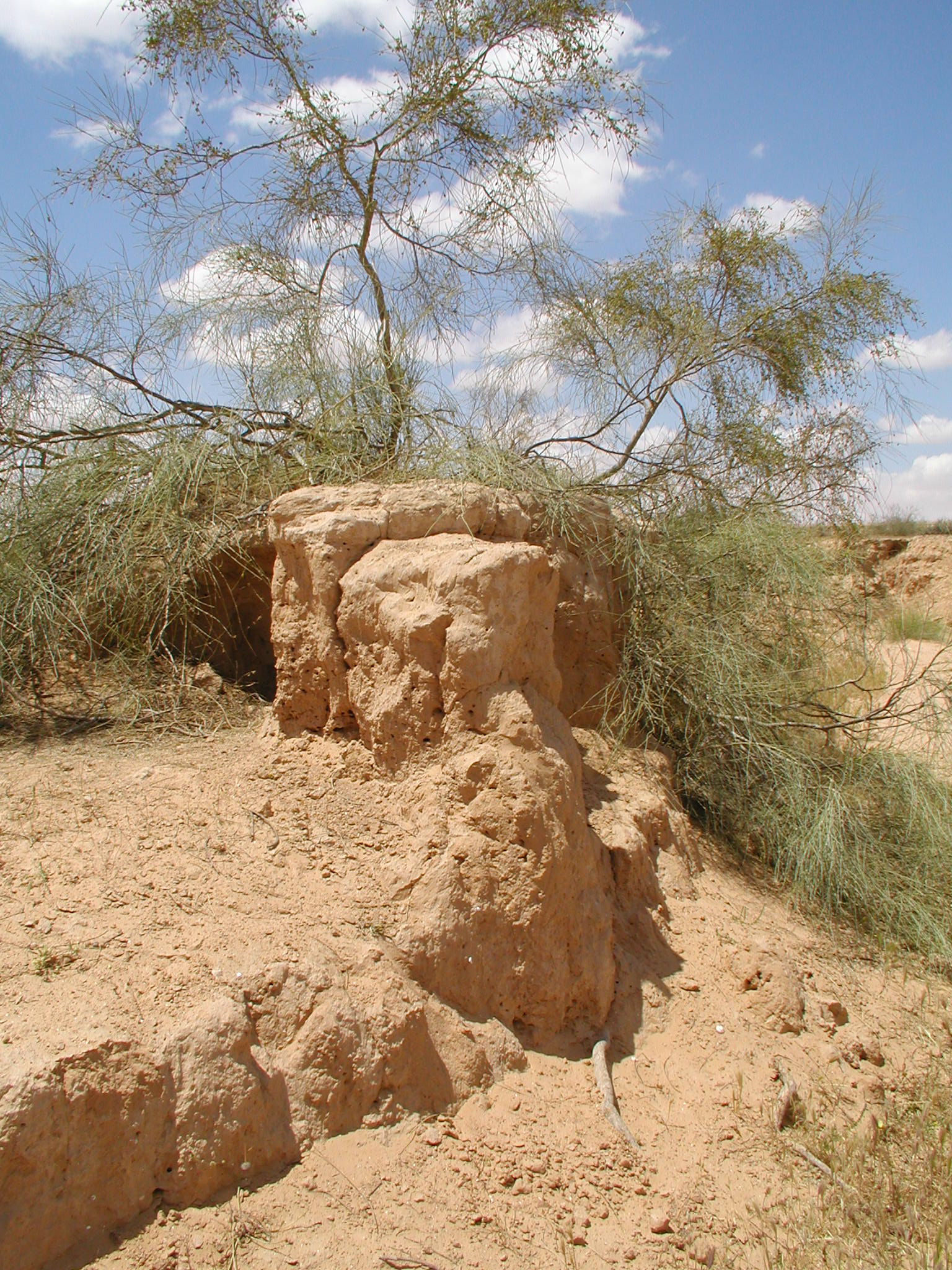
The Tamarix tree occurs in this ecoregion.

The Tibesti (and to a lesser extent the Jebel Uweinat massif) foster higher, more regular rainfall and cooler temperatures than the surrounding Sahara. This supports woodlands and shrublands of date palm (Phoenix dactylifera), acacias, Saharan myrtle (Myrtus nivellei), oleander (Nerium oleander), tamarix, and several endemic and rare plant species, such as Ficus teloukat. The northern slopes are humid enough to support wetland species such as Juncus maritimus, Typha domingensis, Scirpoides holoschoenus, Phragmites australis, and Equisetum ramosissimum.

== Fauna ==
The ecoregion supports, or supported, populations of several important Saharan large mammals. One, the scimitar-horned oryx Oryx dammah is now believed to be extinct in the wild, while the addax Addax nasomaculatus is critically endangered. Other species include dorcas gazelle Gazella dorcas which is assessed as vulnerable, dama gazelle Nanger dama which is endangered, Barbary sheep Ammotragus lervia which is vulnerable and cheetah Acinonyx jubatus which is vulnerable. In 2000 Barbary sheep and dama gazelle were recorded in the Jebel Uweinat portion of the ecoregion.

Smaller mammals are abundant, including rock hyrax Procavia capensis, Cape hare Lepus capensis, many mice, gerbils and jirds and three species of fox, Rüppell's fox Vulpes rueppelli, pale fox Vulpes pallida and fennec fox Fennecus zerda. Other predators are found in the region including a relict population of African wild dog Lycaon pictus as well as striped hyena Hyaena hyaena and golden jackal Canis aureus, primarily in the southern portion of the region.

== Locusts ==
In habitats dominated by Schouwia and Tribulus terrestris in the wadis of this region, have an important role in the life cycle of the desert locust. This is where the female locusts lay their eggs, as the soil is moist and when the locust nymphs emerge, the leaves of Schouwia and Tribulus are fed on, allowing the nymphs to get enough food and water to mature. In some years, if conditions are right they can amass into large swarms, eventually becoming a plague which can reach distant areas of Africa and Europe, and have a huge economic impact by destroying crops.
