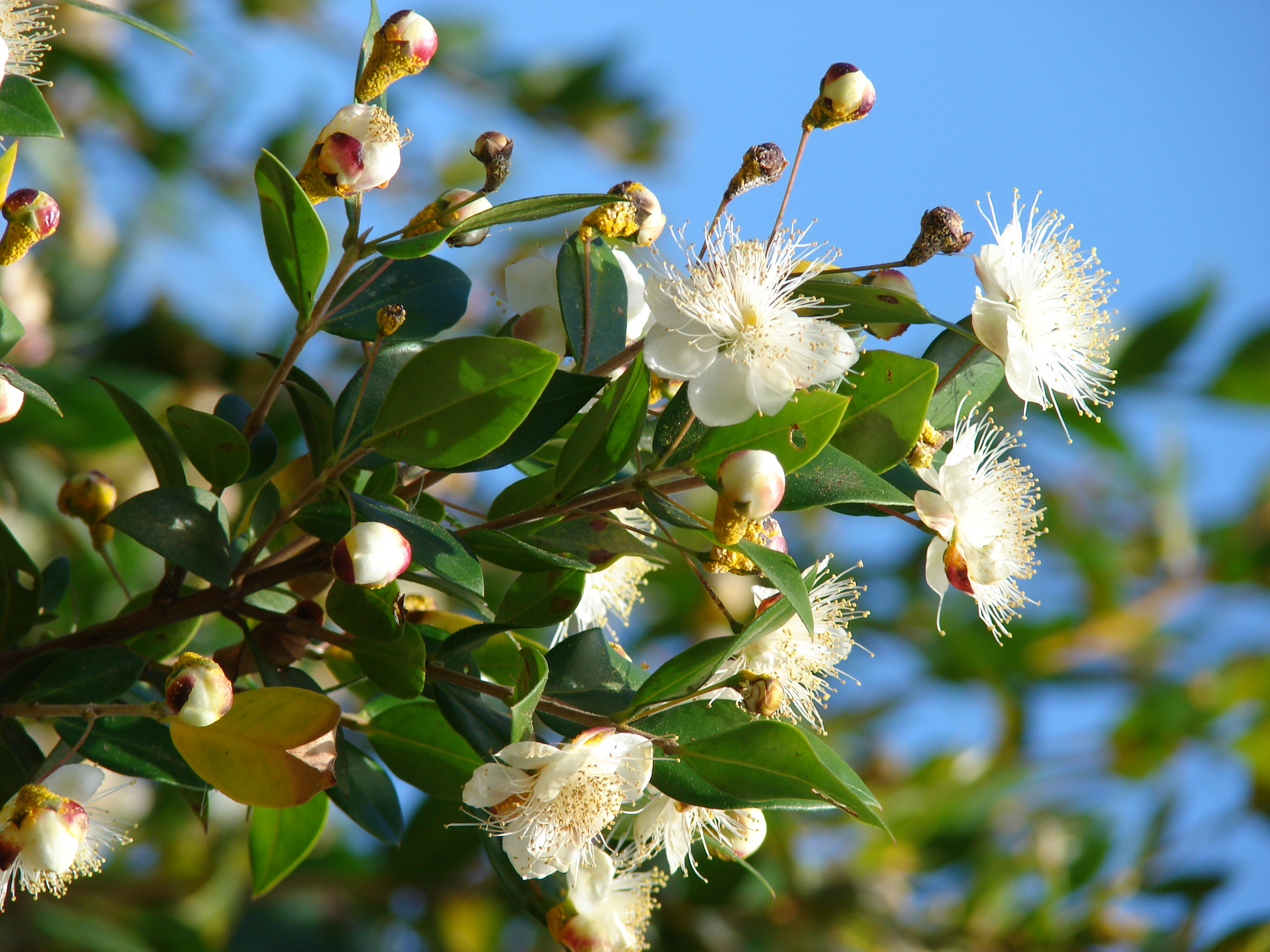
- Myrtus communis
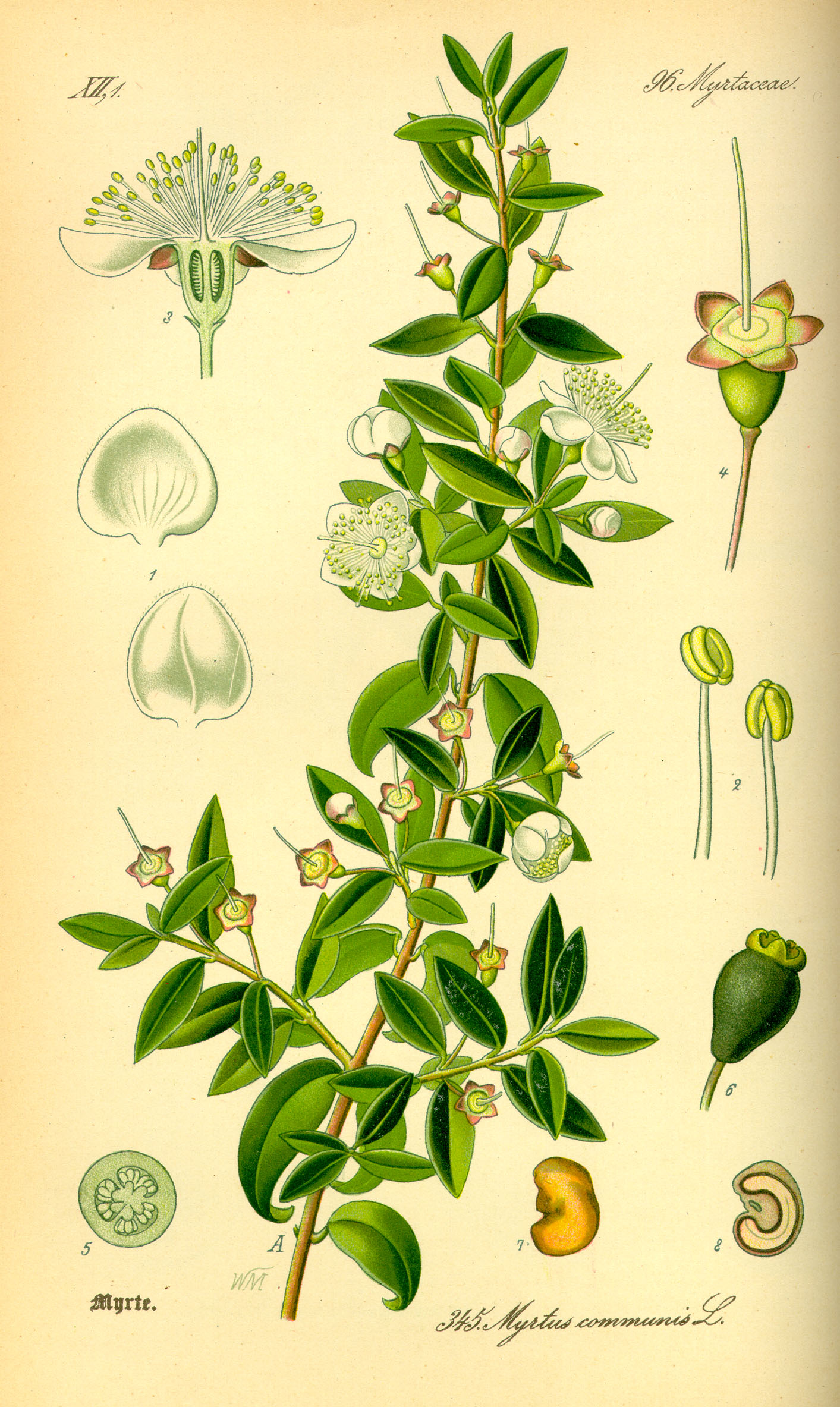
- Myrtle (M. communis)

Scientific classification
- Kingdom: Plantae
- Clade: Tracheophytes
- Clade: Angiosperms
- Clade: Eudicots
- Clade: Rosids
- Order: Myrtales
- Family: Myrtaceae
- Subfamily: Myrtoideae
- Tribe: Myrteae
- Genus: Myrtus; Tourn. ex L.

Type species
- Myrtus communis L.

Species
- Myrtus communis L.; Myrtus nivellei Batt. & Trab.

Synonyms
- Myrthus Scop.

= Myrtus =

Myrtus Myrtle

Genus of flowering plants in the myrtle family

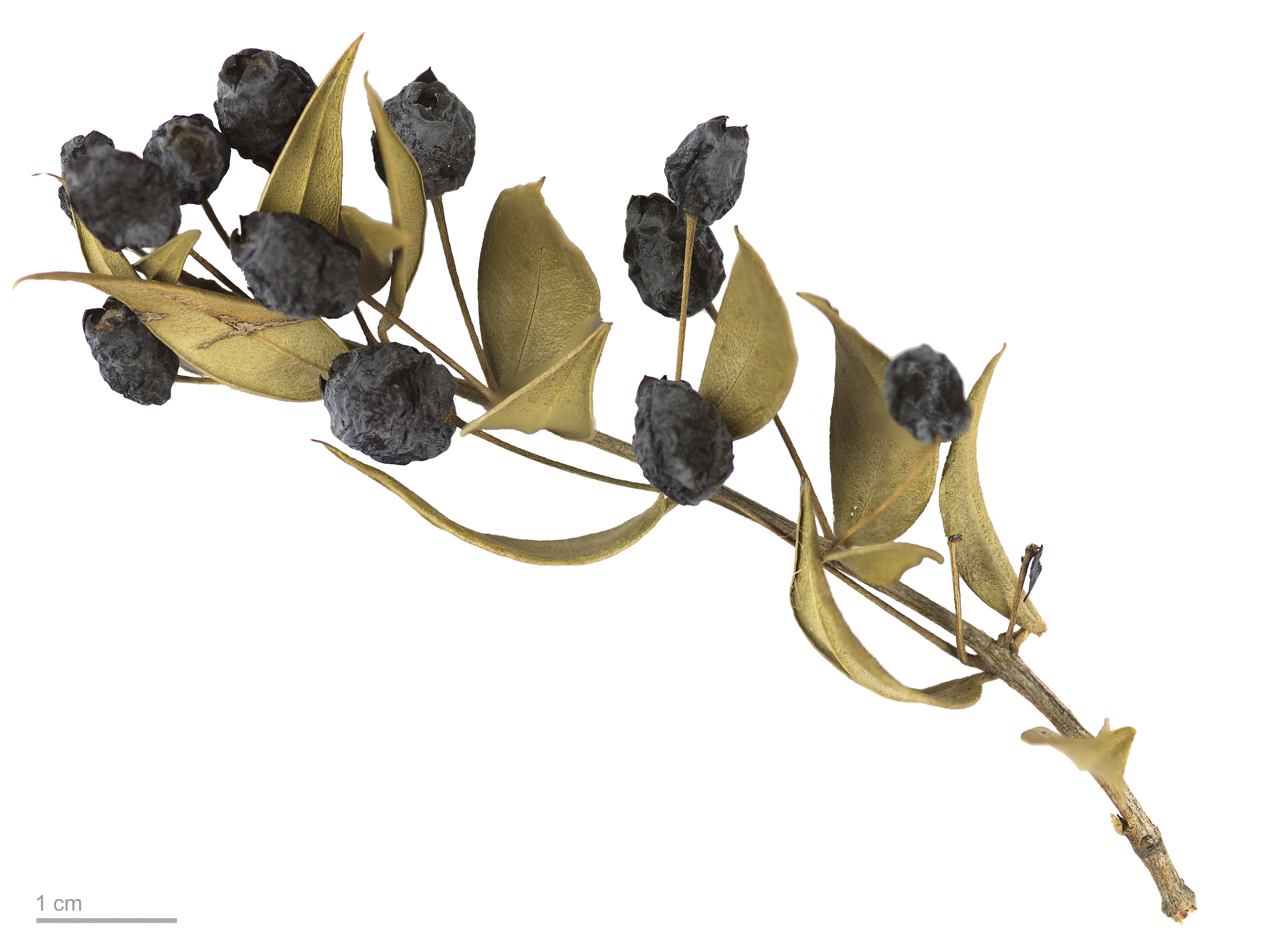
Myrtus communis – MHNT

Myrtus (commonly called myrtle) is a genus of flowering plants in the family Myrtaceae. It was first described by Swedish botanist Linnaeus in 1753. Myrtle was described much earlier in Leviticus, as part of the feast and observance of Sukkot. It has long been used as a medicinal herb in traditional practices.

Over 600 names have been proposed in the genus, but nearly all have either been moved to other genera or been regarded as synonyms. Two species are currently accepted:

- Myrtus communis L. – Common myrtle; native to the Mediterranean region in southern Europe
- Myrtus nivellei Batt. & Trab. – Saharan myrtle; native to the Saharan mountains of northern Africa

== Description ==
=== Common myrtle ===
Myrtus communis, the "common myrtle", is native across the Mediterranean region, Macaronesia, western Asia, and the Indian subcontinent. It is also cultivated.

The plant is an evergreen shrub or small tree, growing to 5 metres (16 ft) tall. The leaf is entire, 3–5 cm long, with a fragrant essential oil.

The star-like flower has five petals and sepals, and numerous stamens. Petals usually are white. The flower is pollinated by insects.

The fruit is a round berry containing several seeds, most commonly blue-black in colour. A variety with yellow-amber berries is also present. The seeds are dispersed by birds that eat the berries.

=== Saharan myrtle ===
Myrtus nivellei, the Saharan myrtle, (Tuareg language: tefeltest), is endemic to the mountains of the central Sahara Desert. It is found in a restricted range in the Tassili n'Ajjer Mountains in southern Algeria, and the Tibesti Mountains in northern Chad.

It occurs in small areas of sparse relict woodland at montane elevations above the central Saharan desert plains.

It is a traditional medicinal plant for the Tuareg people.

== Fossil record ==
Two hundred and fifty fossil seeds of †Myrtus palaeocommunis have been described from middle Miocene strata of the Fasterholt area near Silkeborg in Central Jutland, Denmark.

== Uses ==
=== Gardening ===
Myrtus communis is widely cultivated as an ornamental plant for use as a shrub in gardens and parks. It is often used as a hedge plant, with its small leaves shearing cleanly.

When trimmed less frequently, it has numerous flowers in late summer. It requires a long hot summer to produce its flowers, and protection from winter frosts.

The species and the subspecies M. communis subsp. tarentina have gained the Royal Horticultural Society's Award of Garden Merit.

=== Culinary ===
Myrtus communis is used in the islands of Sardinia and Corsica to produce an aromatic liqueur called Mirto by macerating it in alcohol. Mirto is one of the most typical drinks of Sardinia and comes in two varieties: mirto rosso (red) produced by macerating the berries, and mirto bianco (white) produced from the less common yellow berries and sometimes the leaves.

Many Mediterranean pork dishes include myrtle berries, and roasted piglet is often stuffed with myrtle sprigs in the belly cavity, to impart an aromatic flavour to the meat.

The berries, whole or ground, have been used as a pepper substitute. They contribute to the distinctive flavor of some versions of Italian Mortadella sausage and the related American Bologna sausage.

In Calabria, a myrtle branch is threaded through dried figs and then baked. The figs acquire a pleasant taste from the essential oils of the herb. They are then enjoyed through the winter months.

=== Medicinal ===
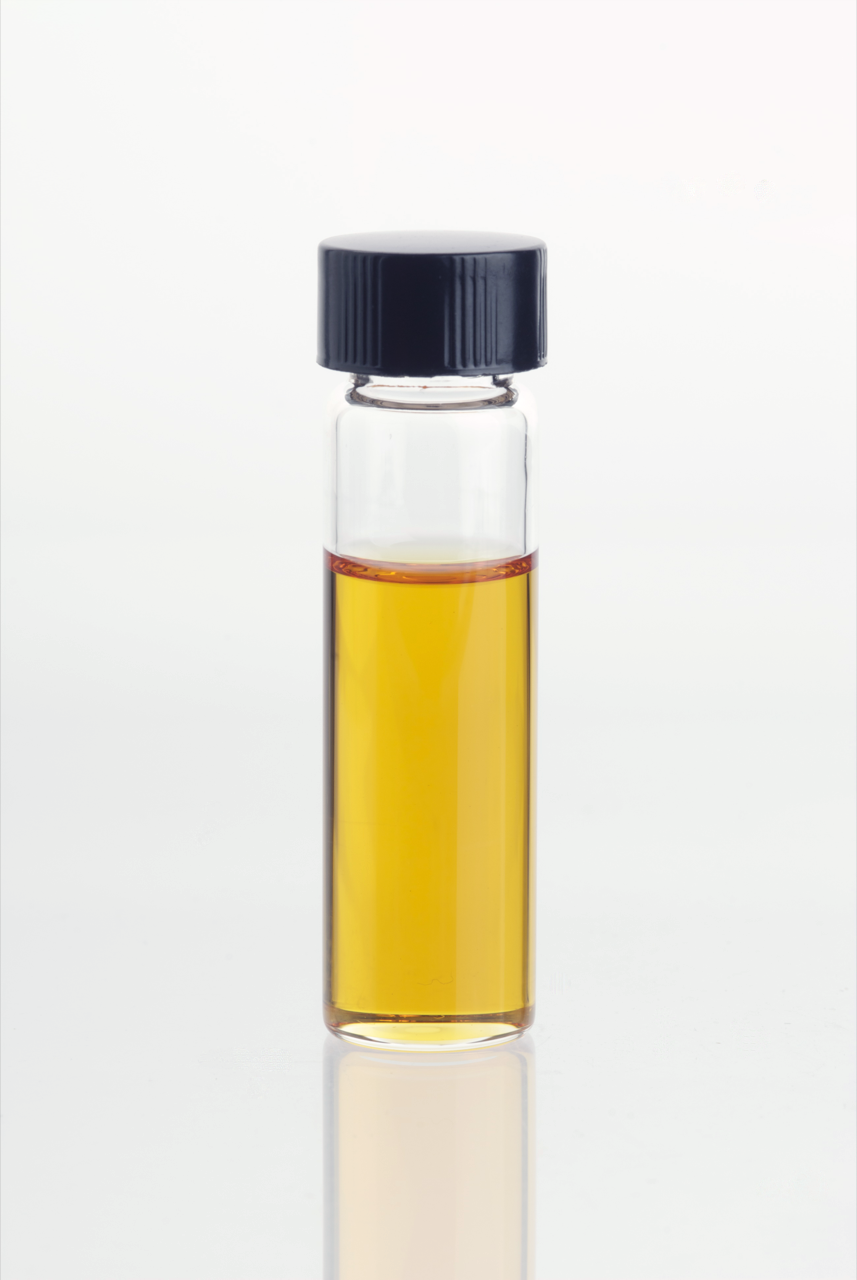
Myrtle (Myrtus communis) essential oil in a clear glass vial

Myrtle, along with willow tree bark, occupies a minor place in the writings of Hippocrates, Pliny, Dioscorides, Galen, and the Arabian writers. Celsus, for instance, suggested that 'soda in vinegar, or ladanum in myrtle oil and wine' could be used to treat various ailments of the scalp. It is possible that Myrtle's effect was due to high levels of salicylic acid.

In several countries, particularly in Europe and China, there has been a tradition for prescribing this substance for sinus infections. A systematic review of herbal medicines used for the treatment of rhinosinusitis concluded that the evidence that any herbal medicines are beneficial in the treatment of rhinosinusitis is limited, and that for Myrtus there is insufficient data to verify the significance of clinical results. In traditional Persian medicine myrtus communis, specially the leaves, are used to stop bleeding. In a research the aqueous extract of the leaves showed hemostatic activity in the rat tail-bleeding model.

=== In myth and ritual ===
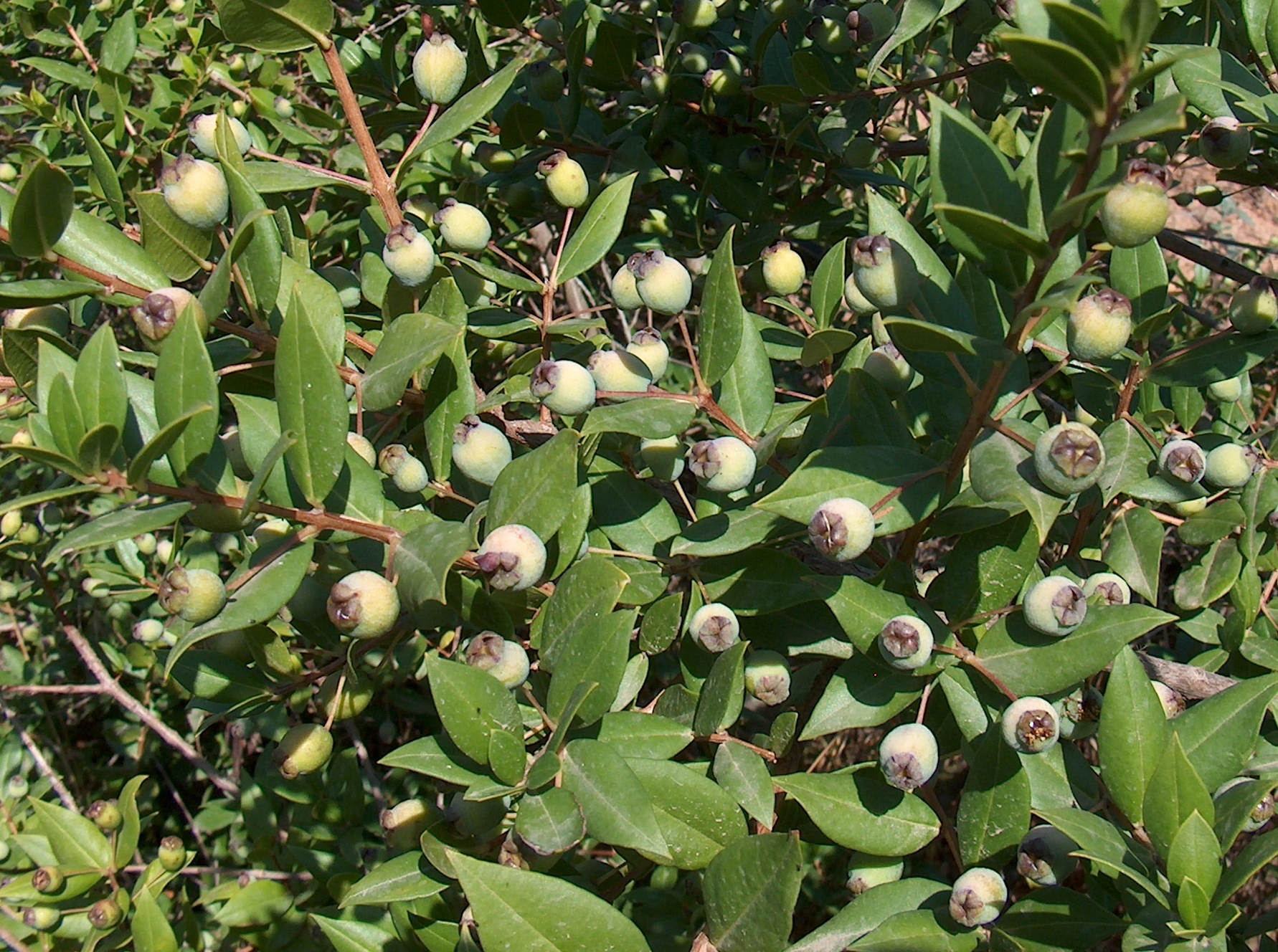
Unripe myrtle berries of blue ("black") variety

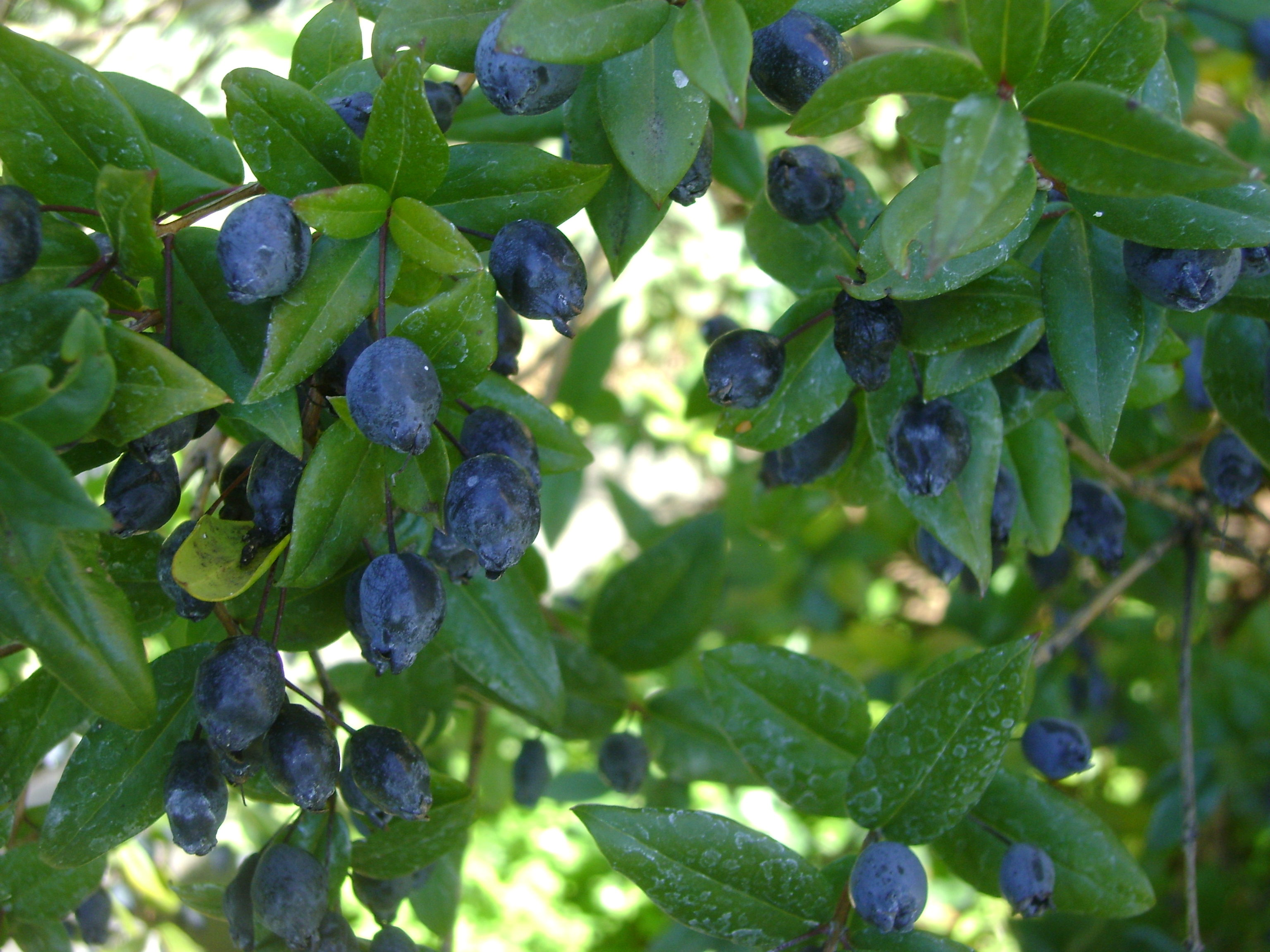
Ripe myrtle berries of the blue ("black") variety

==== Classical ====
In Greek mythology and ritual the myrtle was sacred to the goddesses Aphrodite and also Demeter: Artemidorus asserts that in interpreting dreams "a myrtle garland signifies the same as an olive garland, except that it is especially auspicious for farmers because of Demeter and for women because of Aphrodite. For the plant is sacred to both goddesses." Pausanias explains that one of the Graces in the sanctuary at Elis holds a myrtle branch because "the rose and the myrtle are sacred to Aphrodite and connected with the story of Adonis, while the Graces are of all deities the nearest related to Aphrodite." Myrtle is the garland of Iacchus, according to Aristophanes, and of the victors at the Theban Iolaea, held in honour of the Theban hero Iolaus.

Two myths are connected to the myrtle; in the first, Myrsine was a chaste girl beloved by Athena who outdid all the other athletes, so they murdered her in retaliation. Athena turned her into a myrtle, which became sacred to her. In the second, Myrina was a dedicated priestess of Aphrodite who was either abducted to be married or willingly wished to be married despite her vows. In any case, Aphrodite turned her into myrtle, and gave it fragrant smell, as her favourite and sacred plant.

In Rome, Virgil explains that "the poplar is most dear to Alcides, the vine to Bacchus, the myrtle to lovely Venus, and his own laurel to Phoebus." At the Veneralia, women bathed wearing crowns woven of myrtle branches, and myrtle was used in wedding rituals. In the Aeneid, myrtle marks the grave of the murdered Polydorus in Thrace. Aeneas' attempts to uproot the shrub cause the ground to bleed, and the voice of the dead Polydorus warns him to leave. The spears which impaled Polydorus have been magically transformed into the myrtle which marks his grave.

==== Afghan tradition ====
In Afghan and Persian (Iranian) traditions, the myrtle leaves are used to avoid evil eyes. The leaves (preferably dry ones) are set on fire, fumigated and smoke is acquired like the same what is believed about Peganum harmala. In Afghanistan it is named "ماڼو" (māṇo).

==== Jewish ====
In Jewish liturgy, the myrtle is one of the four species (sacred plants) of Sukkot, representing the different types of personality making up the community. The myrtle having fragrance but not pleasant taste, represents those who have good deeds to their credit despite not having knowledge from Torah study. The three branches are lashed or braided together by the worshipers with a palm leaf, a willow bough, and a myrtle branch. The etrog or citron is the fruit held in the other hand as part of the lulav wave ritual.

Myrtle branches were sometimes given the bridegroom as he entered the nuptial chamber after a wedding (Tos. Sotah 15:8; Ketubot 17a). Myrtles are both the symbol and scent of the Garden of Eden (BhM II: 52; Sefer ha-Hezyonot 17). The Hekhalot text the Merkavah Rabbah requires one to suck on a myrtle leaves as an element of a theurgic ritual. Kabbalists link myrtle to the sefira of Tiferet and use sprigs in their Shabbat (especially Havdalah) rites to draw down its harmonizing power as the week is initiated (Shab. 33a; Zohar Chadash, SoS, 64d; Sha’ar ha-Kavvanot, 2, pp. 73–76).

Myrtle leaves were added to the water in the last (seventh) rinsing of the head in the traditional Sephardic tahara manual (teaching the ritual for washing the dead). Myrtles are often used to recite a blessing over a fragrant plant during the Havdalah ceremony, as well as before kiddush in some Sefardic and Hasidic traditions.

==== Mandaean ====
In the Mandaean religion, myrtle wreaths (klila) are used by priests in important religious rituals and ceremonies, such as baptism and death masses (masiqta). Myrtle wreaths also form part of the darfash, the official symbol of Mandaeism consisting of an olive wooden cross covered with a white silk cloth.

==== Contemporary ====
In neo-pagan and wicca rituals, myrtle, though not indigenous beyond the Mediterranean Basin, is now commonly associated with and sacred to Beltane (May Day).

Myrtle in a wedding bouquet is a general European custom.

A sprig of myrtle from Queen Victoria's wedding bouquet was planted as a slip, and sprigs from it have continually been included in royal wedding bouquets.

== Garden history ==
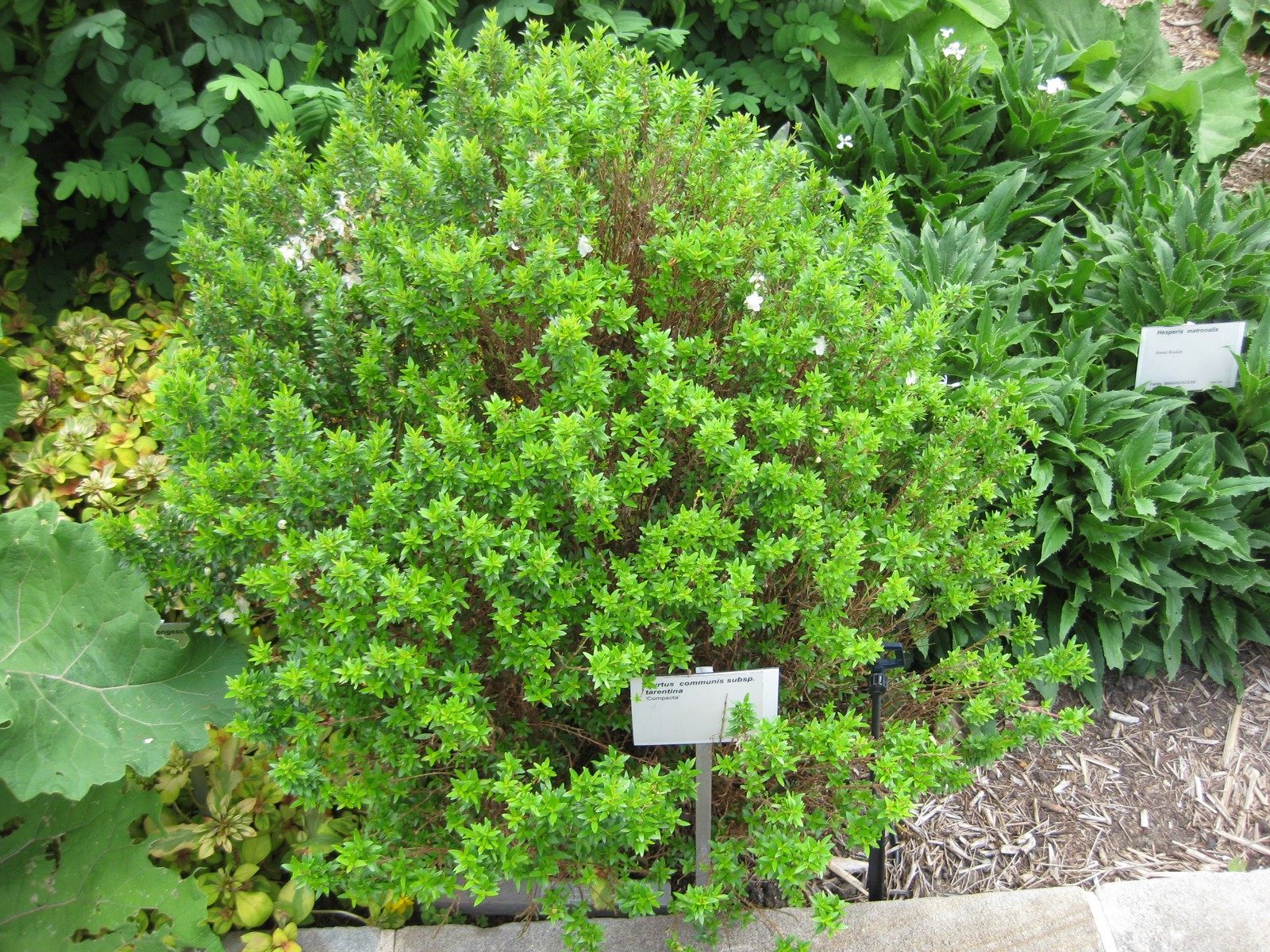
M. communis ssp. tarentina cv. 'compacta' in the garden

=== Rome ===
Because of its elegance of habit, appealing odour, and amenity to clipping by the topiarius, as much as for sacred associations, the myrtle was an indispensable feature of Roman gardens. As a reminder of home, it will have been introduced wherever Roman elites were settled, even in areas of the Mediterranean Basin where it was not already endemic: "the Romans... must surely have attempted to establish a shrub so closely associated with their mythology and tradition," observes Alice Coats. In Gaul and Britannia it will not have proved hardy.

=== England ===
In England it was reintroduced in the 16th century, traditionally with the return from Spain in 1585 of Sir Walter Raleigh, who also brought with him the first orange trees seen in England. Myrtus communis will have needed similar protection from winter cold and wet. Alice Coats notes an earlier testimony: in 1562, Queen Elizabeth I's great minister Lord Burghley wrote to Mr Windebank in Paris to ask him for a lemon, a pomegranate and a myrtle, with instructions for their culture—which suggests that the myrtle, like the others, was not yet familiar.

By 1597, John Gerard lists six varieties being grown in southern England, and by 1640 John Parkinson noted a double-flowering one. Alice Coats suggests that this was the very same double that the diarist and gardener John Evelyn noted "was first discovered by the incomparable Nicolas-Claude Fabri de Peiresc, which a mule had cropt from a wild shrub."

In the late 17th and early 18th centuries, myrtles in cases, pots and tubs were brought out to summer in the garden and wintered with other tender greens in an orangery. Fairchild, The City Gardener (1722) notes their temporary use, rented from a nurseryman annually to fill an empty fireplace in the warm months.

With the influx to England of more dramatic tender plants and shrubs from Japan or Peru in the 19th century, it was more difficult to find room for the common myrtle of borderline hardiness.

== Related plants ==
Many other related plants native to South America, New Zealand and elsewhere, previously classified in a wider interpretation of the genus Myrtus, are now species within other genera, including: Eugenia, Lophomyrtus, Luma, Rhodomyrtus, Syzygium, Ugni, and at least a dozen other genera.

The name "myrtle" is also used in common names (vernacular names) of unrelated plants in several other genera, such as: "Crepe myrtle" (Lagerstroemia species and hybrids, Lythraceae); "Wax myrtle" (Morella species, Myricaceae); and "Creeping myrtle" (Vinca species, Apocynaceae).
