= Wonderboom South, Pretoria =

Wonderboom South

- Location within Gauteng Location within South Africa
- Coordinates: 25°42′0″S 28°12′0″E
- Country: South Africa
- Province: Gauteng
- Municipality: City of Tshwane
- Main Place: Pretoria
- Named for: Wonderboom (tree)

Area
  - Total: 3.32 km^{2} (1.28 sq mi)

Population (2011)
  - Total: 10,347
  - Density: 3,120/km^{2} (8,070/sq mi)

Racial makeup (2011)
  - Black African: 16.1%
  - Coloured: 1.8%
  - Indian/Asian: 1.3%
  - White: 78.9%
  - Other: 1.9%

First languages (2011)
  - Afrikaans: 75.5%
  - English: 9.5%
  - Tswana: 2.3%
  - Northern Sotho: 2.0%
  - Other: 10.7%
- Time zone: UTC+2 (SAST)
- Postal code (street): 0084
- PO box: n/a
- Area code: 012

Wonderboom South is a northern residential suburb of Pretoria, South Africa. It lies to the south of Wonderboom and the Wonderboom tree itself, on the southern slopes of the eastern section of the Magaliesberg mountain range. Voortrekker Road (Voortrekkerweg / M5) is a main arterial and busy thoroughfare running through Wonderboom South.
