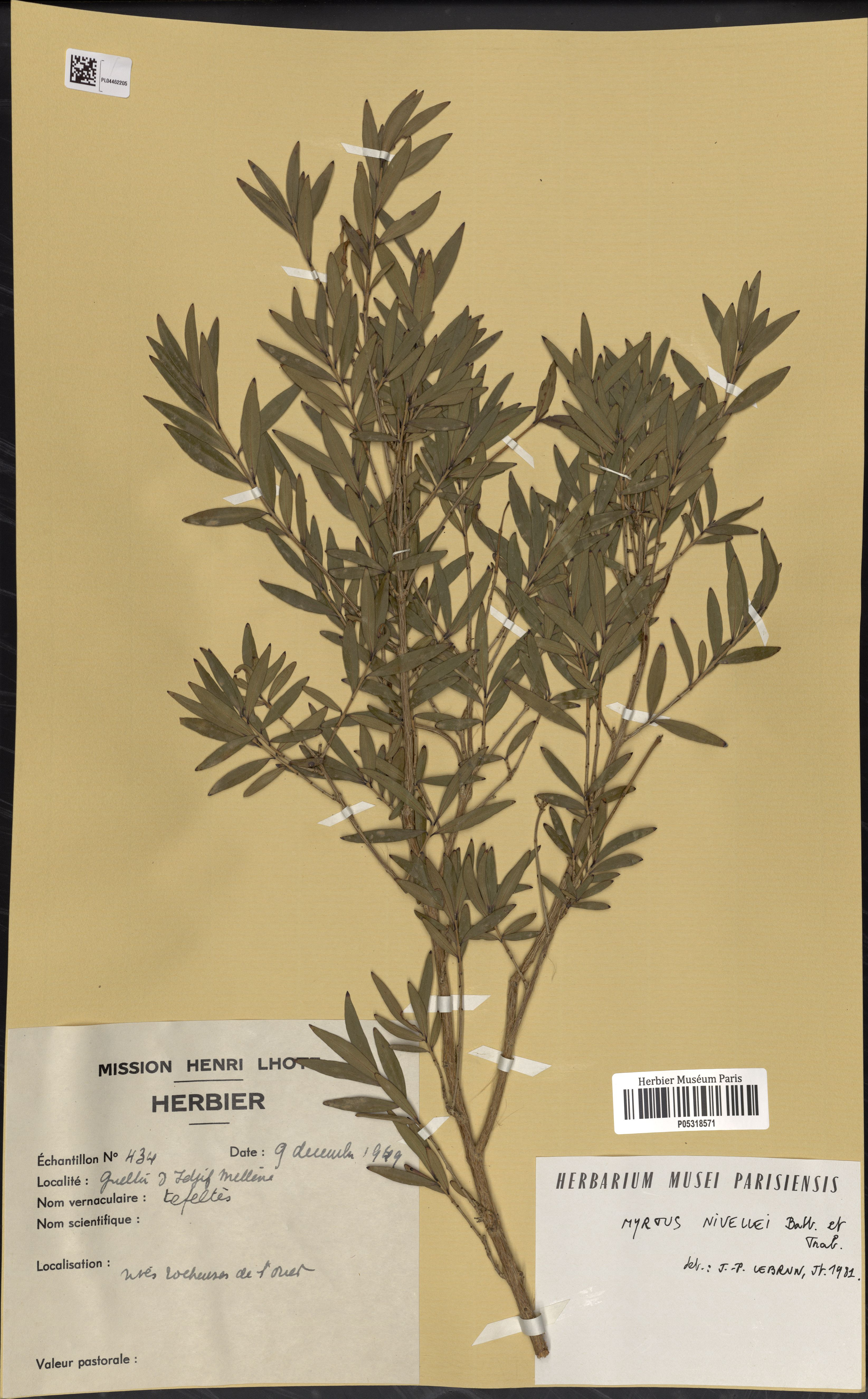

Scientific classification
- Kingdom: Plantae
- Clade: Embryophytes
- Clade: Tracheophytes
- Clade: Angiosperms
- Clade: Eudicots
- Clade: Rosids
- Order: Myrtales
- Family: Myrtaceae
- Genus: Myrtus
- Species: M. nivellei

Binomial name
- Myrtus nivellei Batt. & Trab.

Subspecies
- Myrtus nivellei subsp. nivellei; Myrtus nivellei subsp. tibesticus Quézel

= Myrtus nivellei =

Species of flowering plant

Myrtus nivellei, the Saharan myrtle (Tuareg language: tefeltest), is a shrub endemic to the mountains of the central Sahara desert.

Two subspecies are accepted.

- Myrtus nivellei subsp. nivellei – Tassili n'Ajjer of southern Algeria and southwestern Libya
- Myrtus nivellei subsp. tibesticus Quézel – Tibesti of Chad

The species occurs in small areas of sparse relict woodland at montane elevations above the central Saharan desert plains. It can be found in the Tassili n'Ajjer mountains in southern Algeria and southwestern Libya, and the Tibesti Mountains in northern Chad.

It is used as a traditional medicinal plant by the Tuareg people.
