= Mirto (liqueur) =

Sardinian traditional liqueur

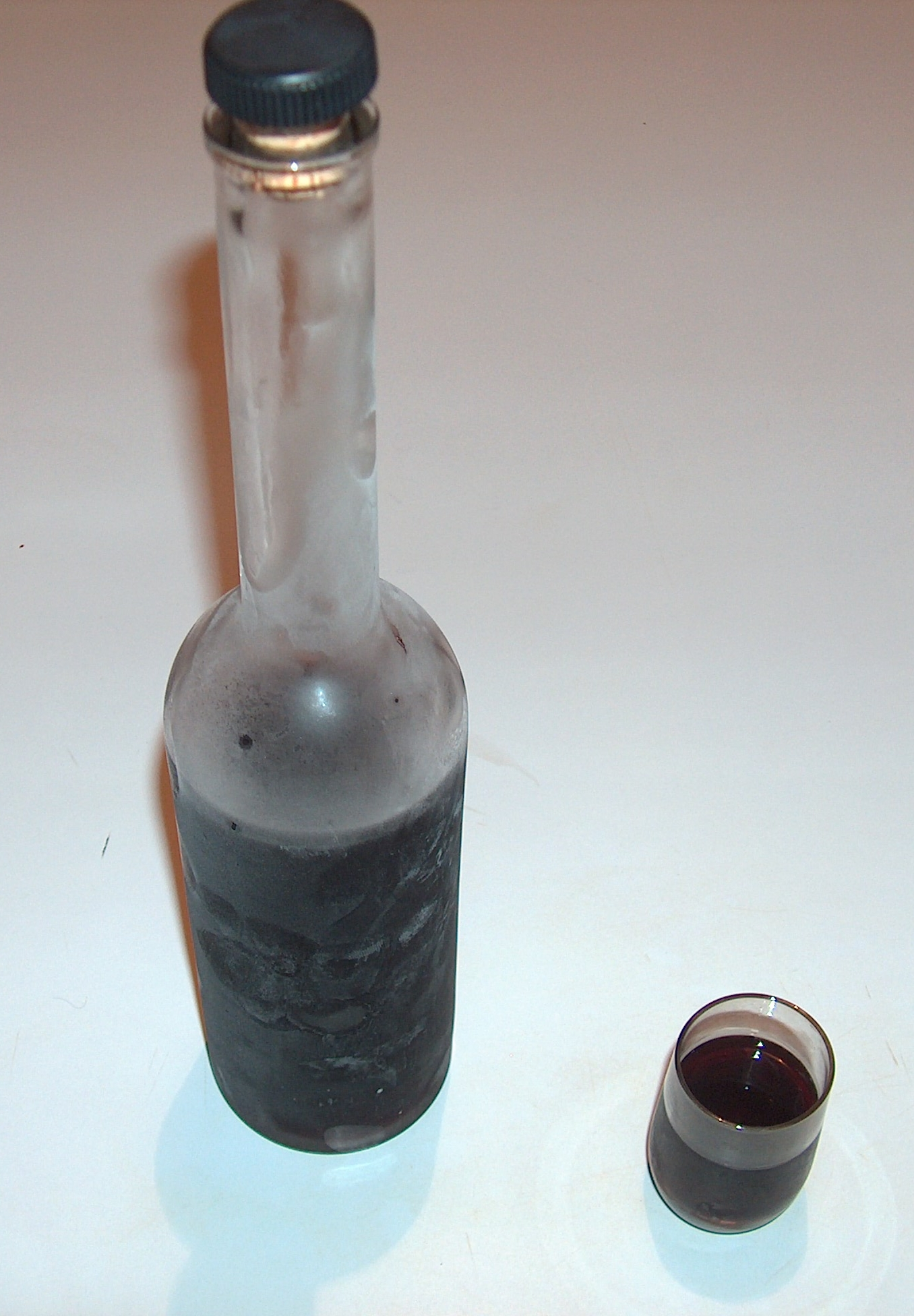
Homemade Sardinian mirto

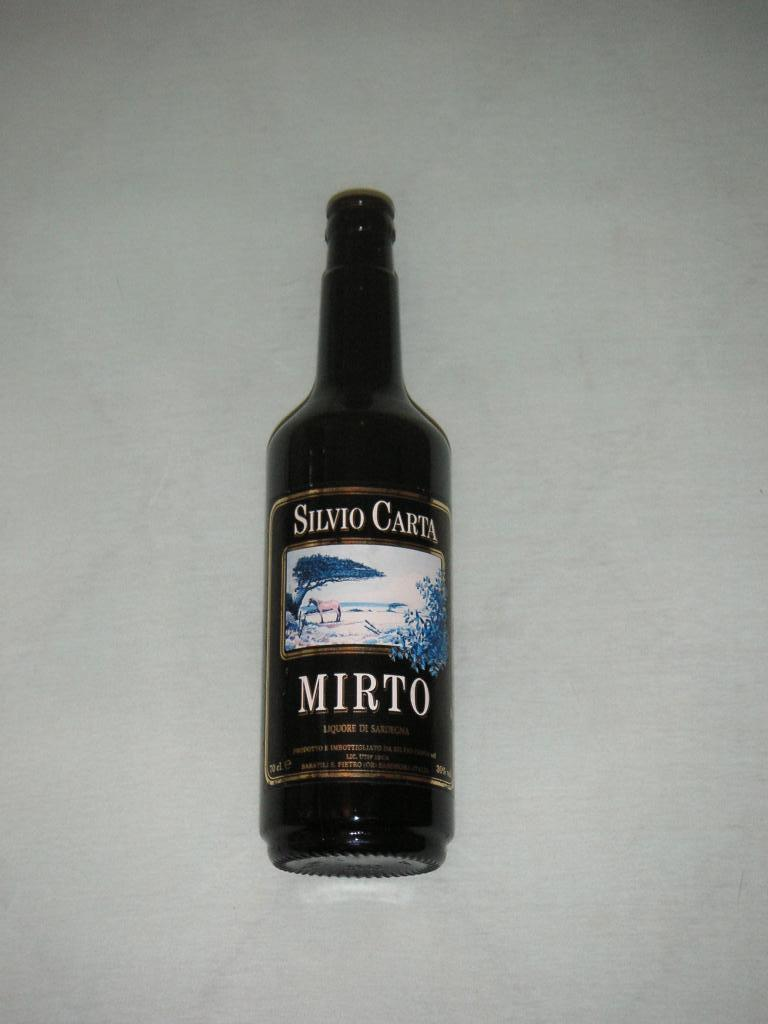
Bottled Sardinian mirto

Mirto (licòre/-i de murta in Sardinian, licòr di mortula in Corsican) is a popular liqueur in the Mediterranean islands of Sardinia, Corsica and Capraia.

It is obtained from the myrtle plant through the alcoholic maceration of the berries or a compound of berries and leaves. Myrtle grows freely in Sardinia, where the liqueur was consumed as part of a local niche market, in two varieties: the one with black berries and the other one with the white ones; legend has it that, long ago, Sardinian bandits introduced this particular usage of the plant to the nearby island of Corsica, where the liqueur has also been considered a traditional drink since then.

== Varieties ==
There are two varieties of myrtle liqueur:

- Mirto rosso (simply murta) is made with the berries of the black variety and is sweet.
- Mirto bianco (murta arba) is made with the berries of the white variety or, less commonly, from young leaves.
