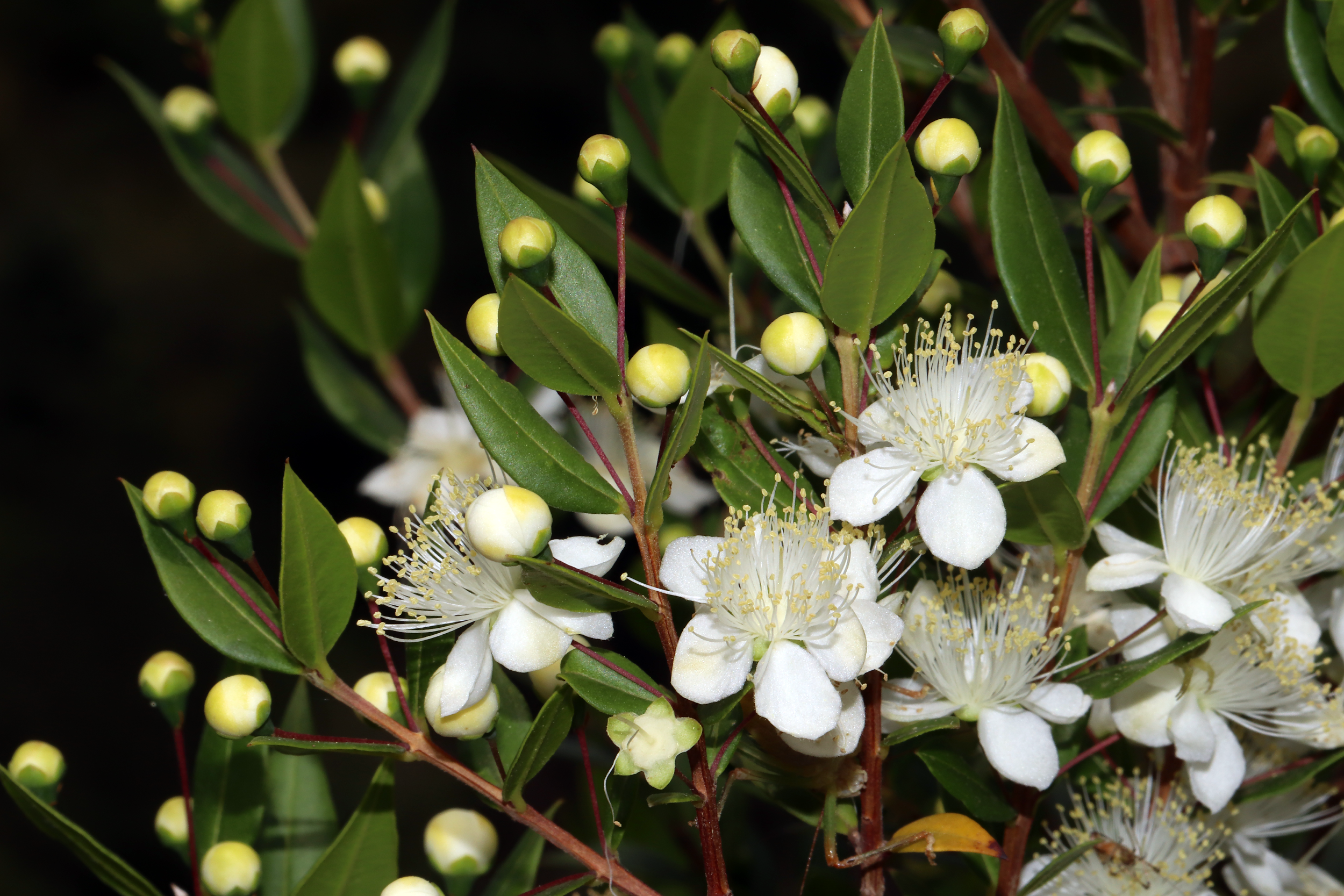

Conservation status
- Least Concern (IUCN 3.1)

Scientific classification
- Kingdom: Plantae
- Clade: Tracheophytes
- Clade: Angiosperms
- Clade: Eudicots
- Clade: Rosids
- Order: Myrtales
- Family: Myrtaceae
- Genus: Myrtus
- Species: M. communis

Binomial name
- Myrtus communis L.

Synonyms
- List: Myrtus acuta Mill.; Myrtus acutifolia (L.) Sennen & Teodoro; Myrtus angustifolia Raf. nom. illeg.; Myrtus augustini Sennen & Teodoro; Myrtus aurantiifolia Grimwood nom. illeg.; Myrtus baetica (L.) Mill.; Myrtus baui Sennen & Teodoro; Myrtus belgica (L.) Mill.; Myrtus borbonis Sennen; Myrtus briquetii (Sennen & Teodoro) Sennen & Teodoro; Myrtus christinae (Sennen & Teodoro) Sennen & Teodoro; Myrtus eusebii (Sennen & Teodoro) Sennen & Teodoro; Myrtus gervasii (Sennen & Teodoro) Sennen & Teodoro; Myrtus italica Mill.; Myrtus josephi Sennen & Teodoro; Myrtus lanceolata Raf. nom. illeg.; Myrtus latifolia Raf. nom. illeg.; Myrtus littoralis Salisb.; Myrtus macrophylla J.St.-Hil.; Myrtus major Garsault nom. inval.; Myrtus media Hoffmanns.; Myrtus microphylla J.St.-Hil.; Myrtus minima Mill.; Myrtus minor Garsault nom. inval.; Myrtus mirifolia Sennen & Teodoro; Myrtus oerstedeana O.Berg; Myrtus petri-ludovici (Sennen & Teodoro) Sennen & Teodoro; Myrtus rodesi Sennen & Teodoro; Myrtus romana (L.) Hoffmanns.; Myrtus romanifolia J.St.-Hil.; Myrtus sparsifolia O.Berg; Myrtus theodori Sennen; Myrtus veneris Bubani; Myrtus vidalii (Sennen & Teodoro) Sennen & Teodoro

= Myrtus communis =

Species of flowering plant

Myrtus communis, the common myrtle or true myrtle, is an Old World species of flowering plant in the myrtle family, Myrtaceae. It forms an evergreen shrub.

== Description ==
The plant is an evergreen shrub or small tree, growing to 5 metres (16 feet) tall. The leaves are 2–5 centimetres (1–2 in) long, with a fragrant essential oil.

The flowers are white or tinged with pink, with five petals and many stamens that protrude from the flower. The fruit is an edible berry that is blue-black when ripe. It is astringent, and therefore has an acerbic taste. The flowers are pollinated by insects, while birds eating the berries spread the seeds.

== Distribution and habitat ==
The species is native to southern Europe, North Africa, Western Asia, Macaronesia, and the Indian subcontinent.

== Cultivation ==
This species and the more compact M. communis subsp. tarentina have won the Royal Horticultural Society's Award of Garden Merit. They are hardy but prefer a sheltered position in full sun.

The plant can be propagated with seeds stratified for 3 months. Also, one can use a cutting with a short heel (small part of the bark), keeping it in moistened rooting mix.

== Uses ==
The essential oils derived from this plant have anti-proliferative and anti-quorum sensing properties, helping against food spoilage. The berries are also macerated in alcohol to make Mirto liqueur.

In Israel, it is a protected species, growing wild in the northern part of the country, as well as cultivated in gardens. Since ancient times, its branches have been an essential part of the Jewish celebration of Sukkot.

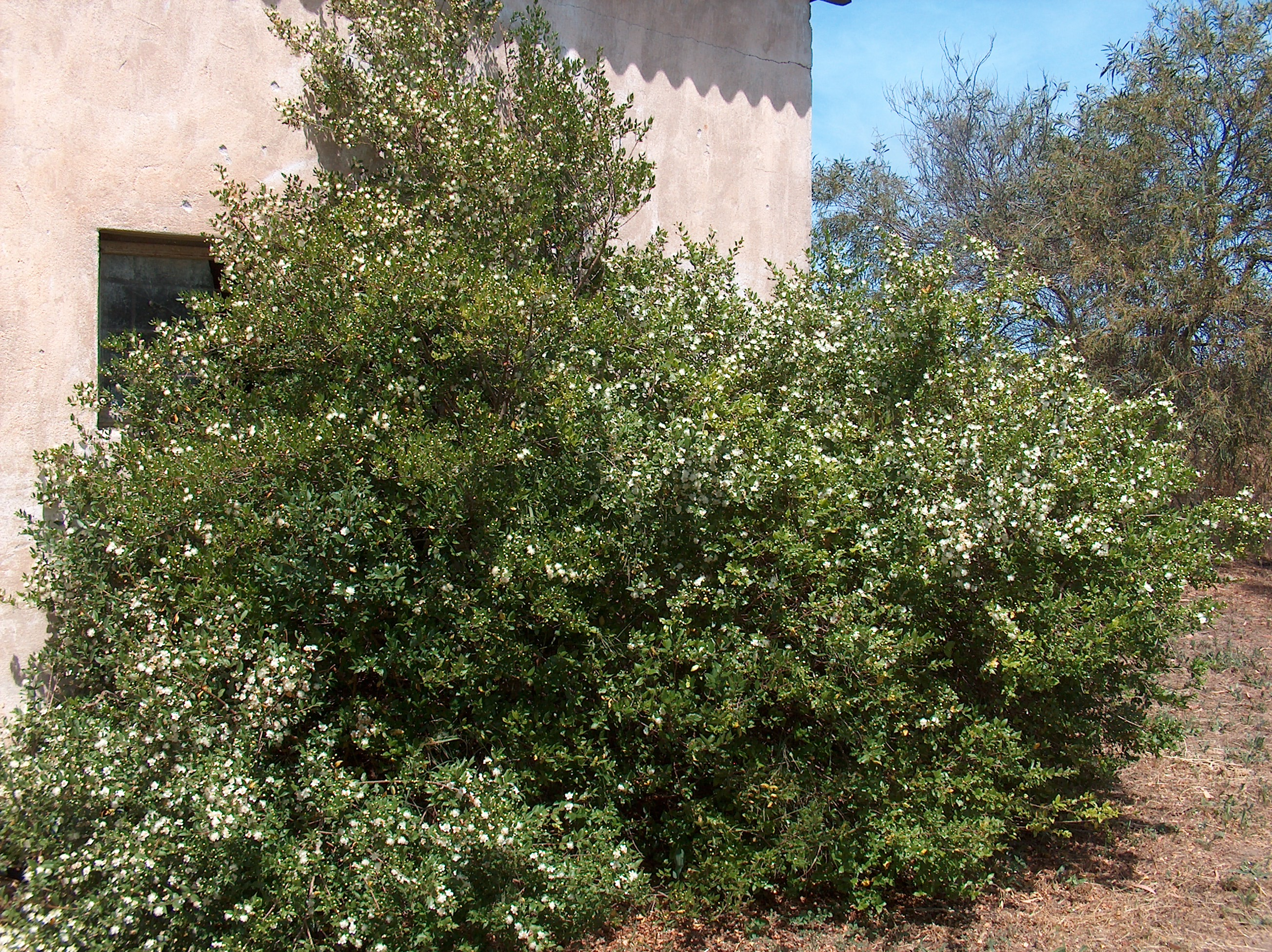
Myrtle plant

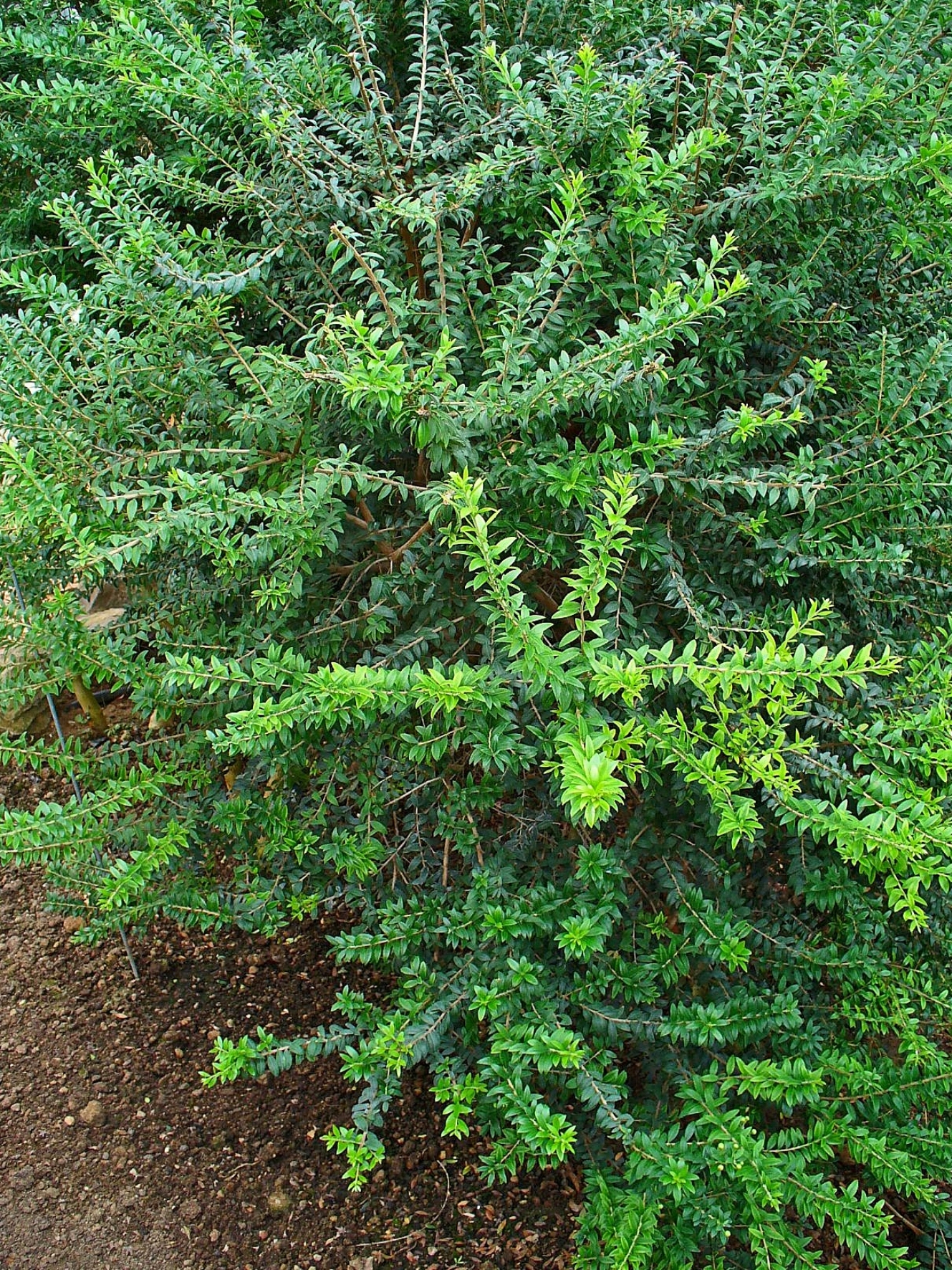
Foliage

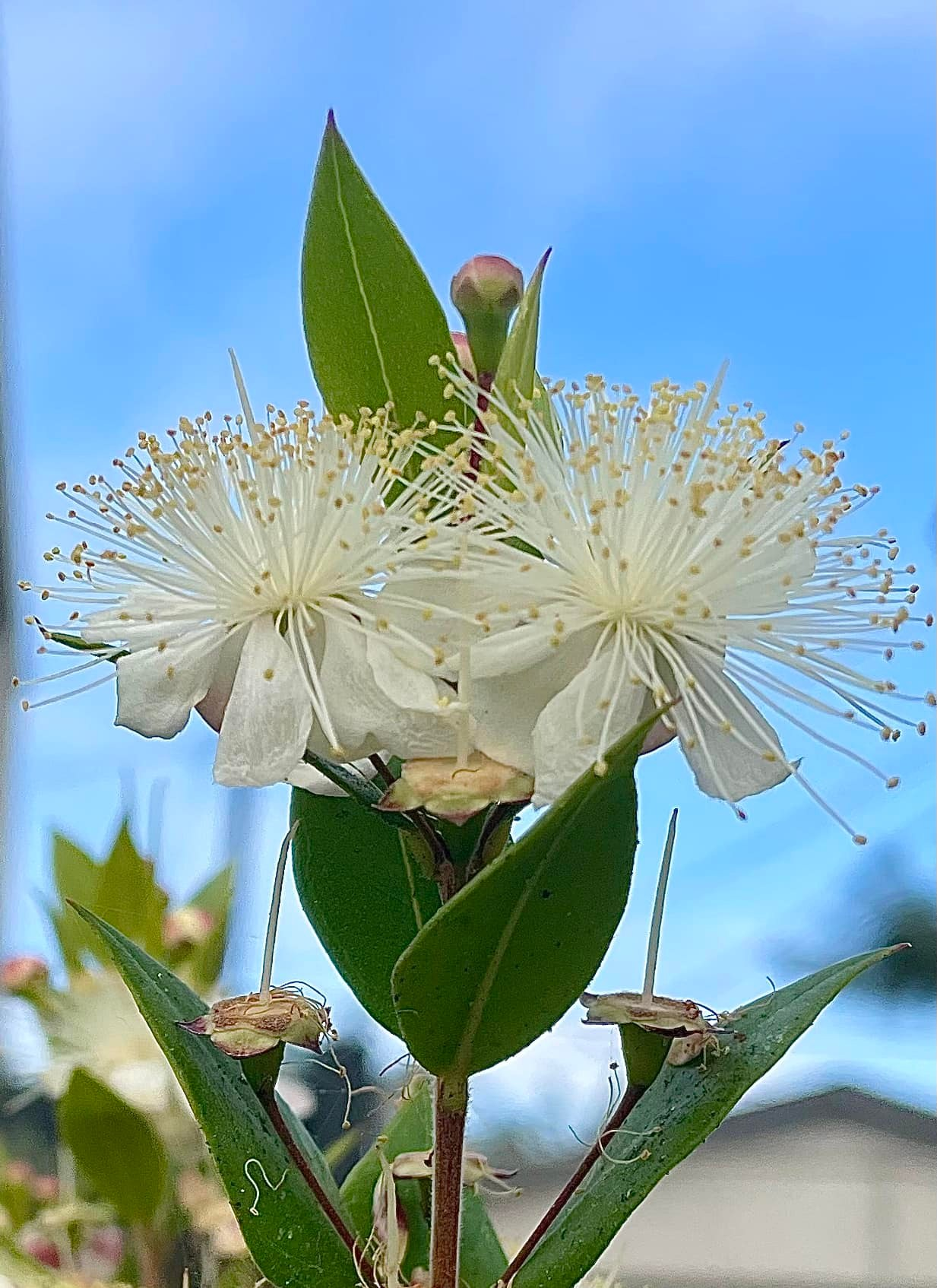
Inflorescence

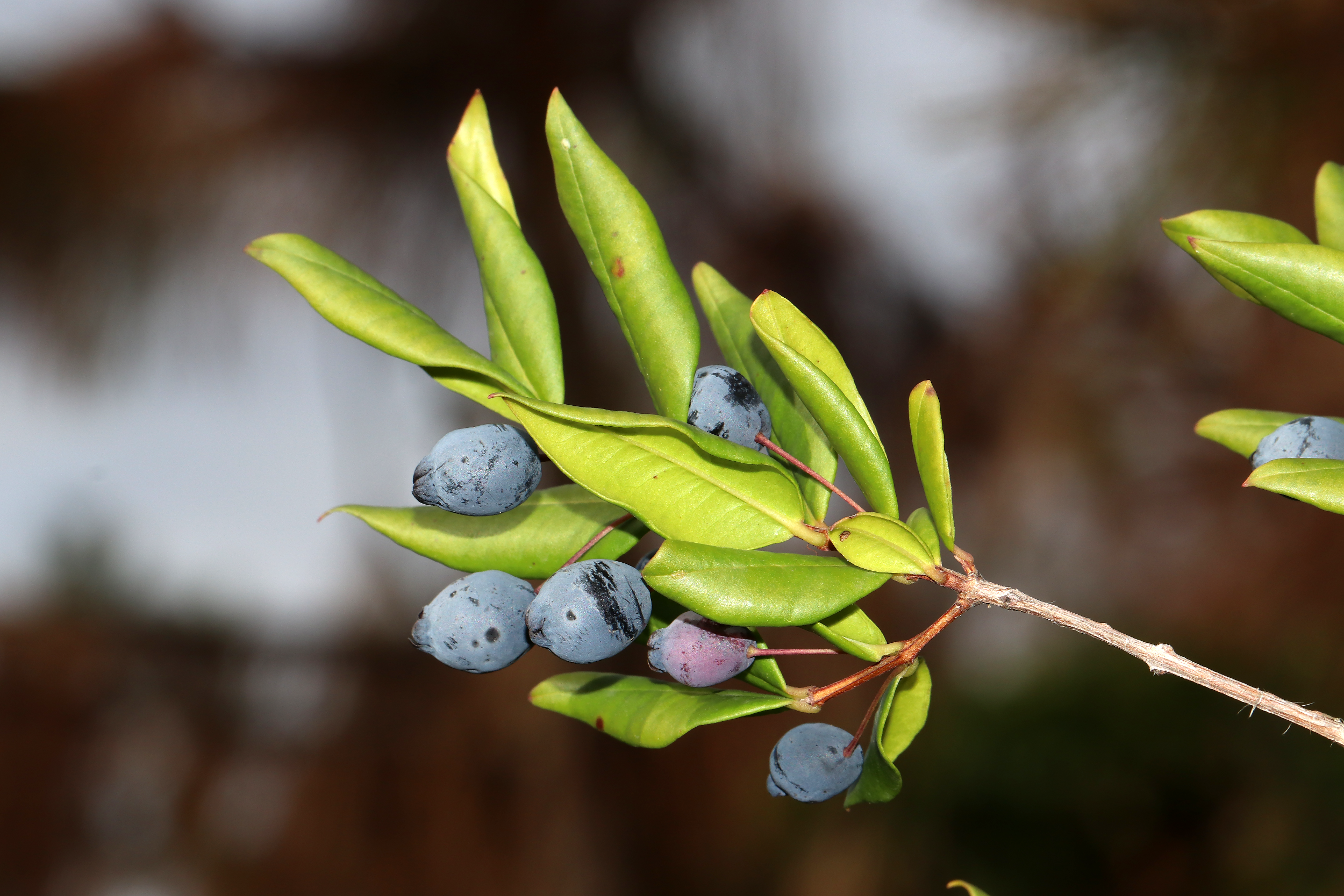
Berries

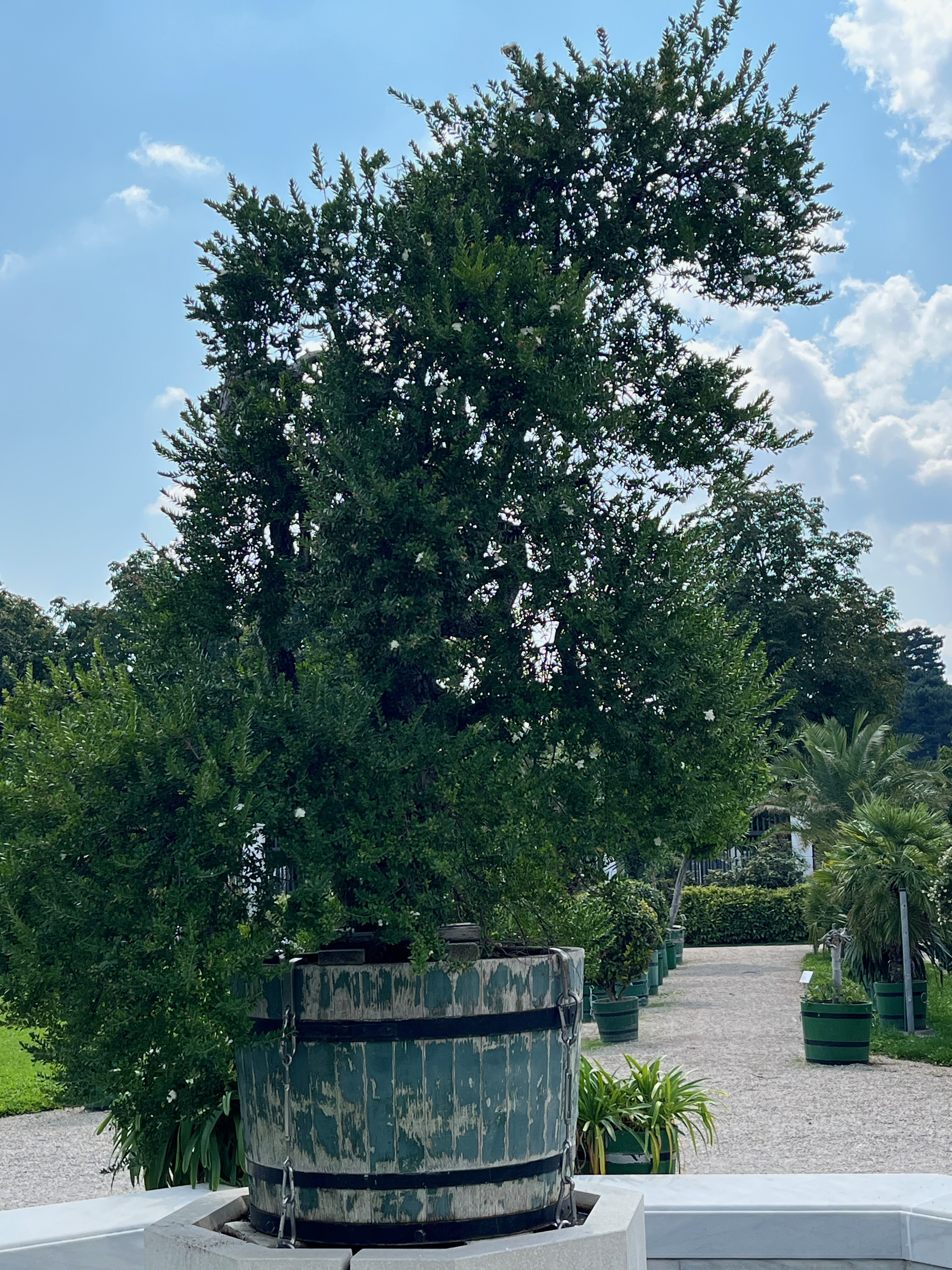
Myrtle pot

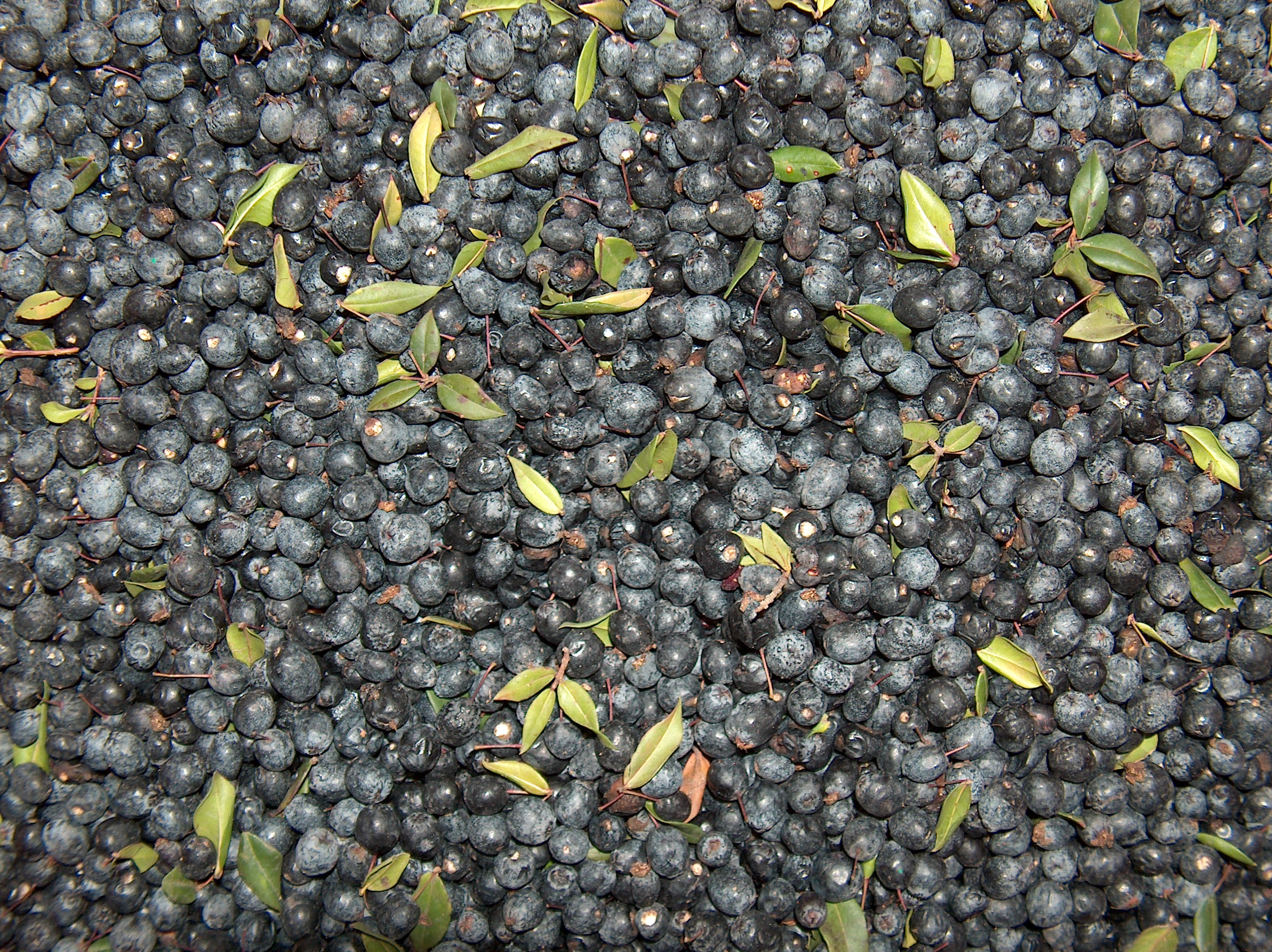
Berries macerated in alcohol to make Mirto liqueur
