= Wonderboom (tree) =

Dense grove of parent and daughter trees of the species Ficus salicifolia

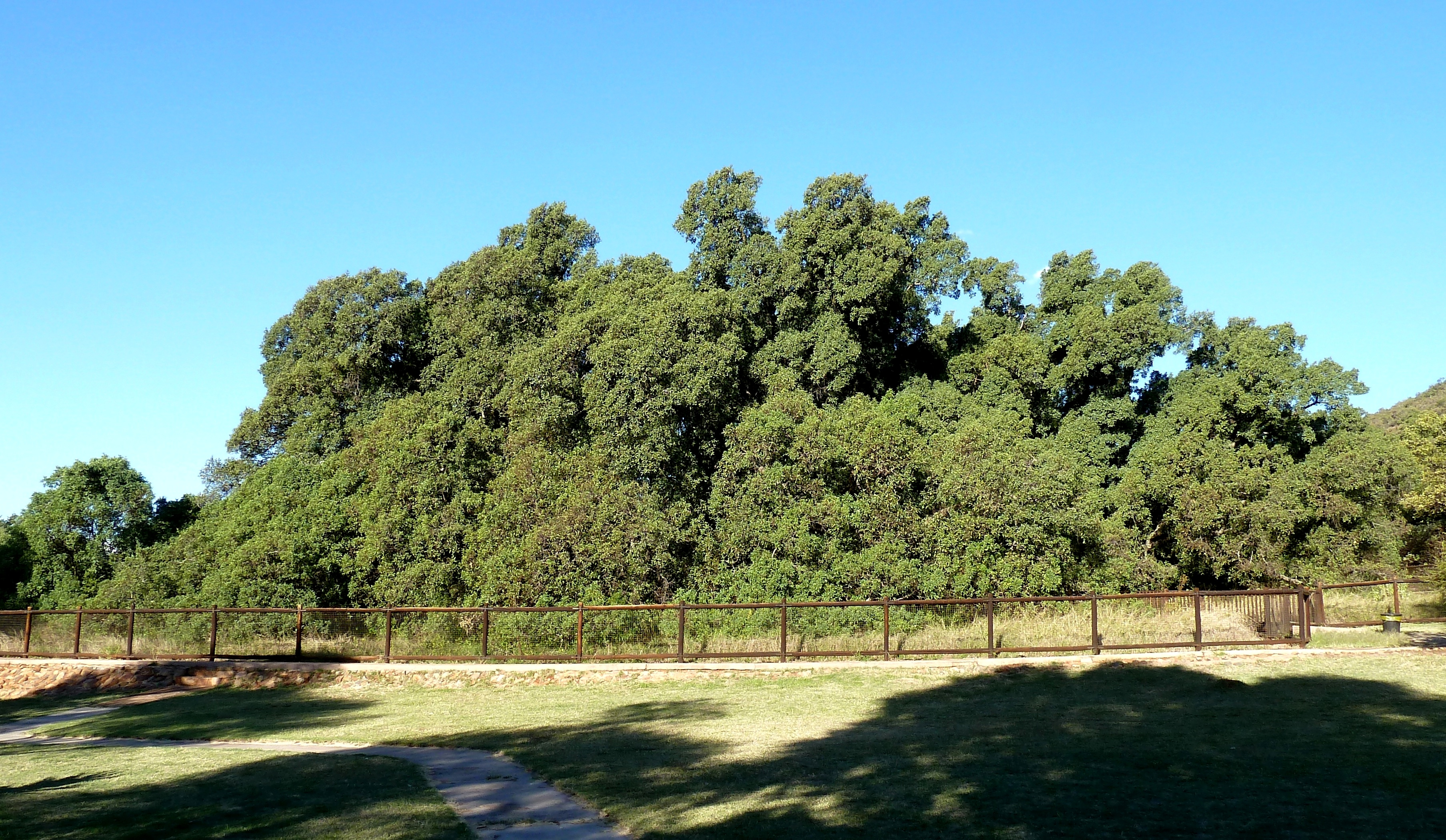
- Interactive map of Wonderboom
- Species: Ficus salicifolia
- Location: Wonderboom Nature Reserve, Pretoria
- Coordinates: 25°41′14.2″S 28°11′30.5″E
- Height: 22 m (72 ft)
- Diameter: 5.38 m (17.7 ft)

The Wonderboom (Afrikaans: 'wonder tree') is a dense grove of parent and daughter trees of the species Ficus salicifolia, that descended from a central bole of about a thousand years old. These include the largest specimens of their species, and are situated in the Wonderboom Nature Reserve, Pretoria. Two circular walkways currently protect it from pedestrian traffic around its trunk and roots. As it has grown, its outlying branches have rooted themselves around the parent tree. This has repeated until there are now three layers of daughter trees encircling the mother fig, with 13 distinct trunks, covering an area with a diameter of over 50 metres (160 ft).

== History ==
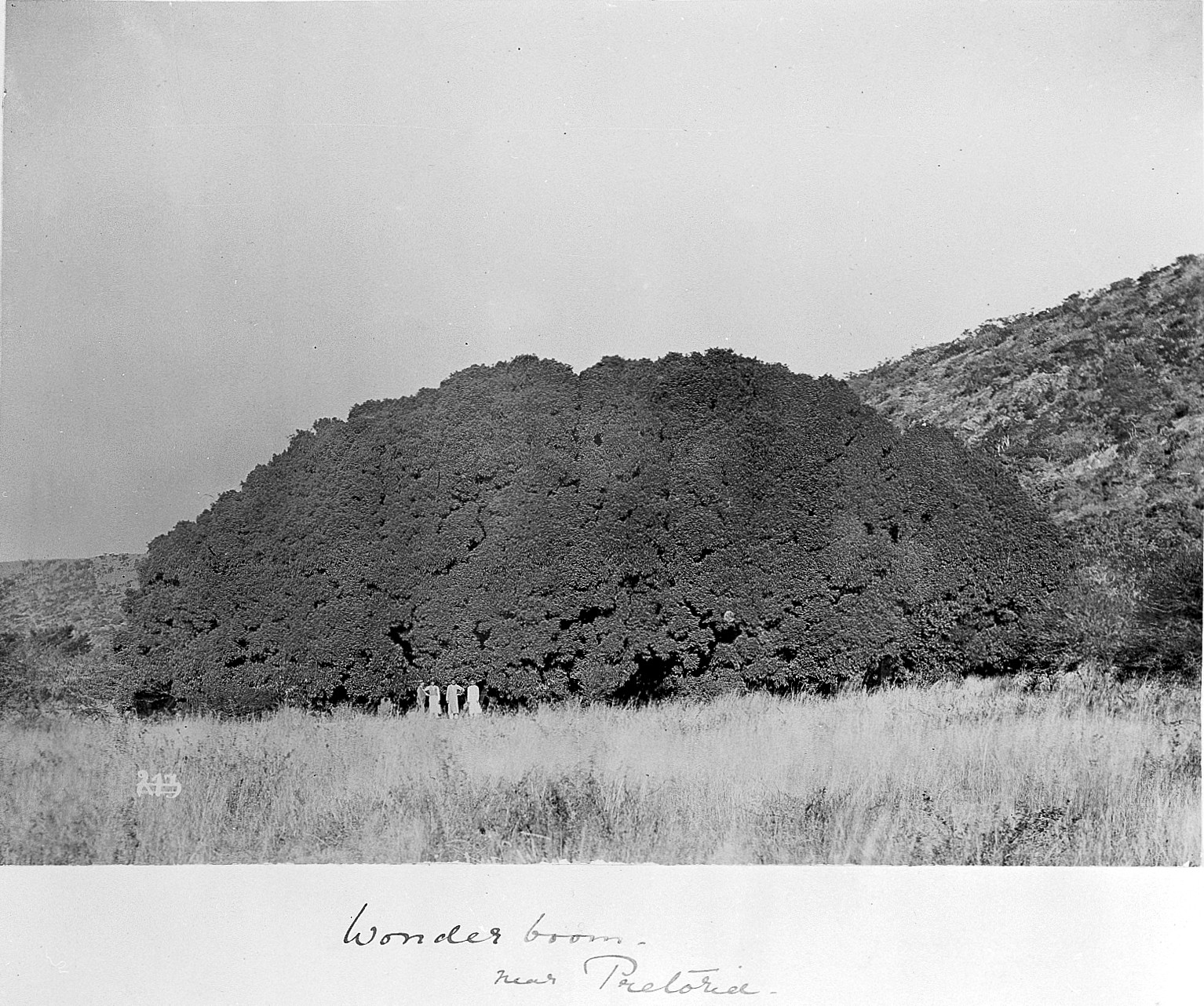
The Wonderboom in 1888.

The tree was discovered by the Voortrekkers in 1836 under the leadership of Hendrik Potgieter, who named it the Wonderboom. Many Trekkers rested under its shade on their journey to the Soutpansberg.

In 1870 a fire destroyed a large part of the tree, reducing its size drastically. The surrounding area, including the tree and the fort atop the Magaliesberg range was proclaimed a nature reserve in March 1937 after the Pretoria City Council purchased the land. The "Wonderboom Nature Reserve" was declared a national monument on 23 September 1988, under old National Monuments Council (NMC) legislation.

The grove was declared a Champion Tree by the Department of Agriculture, Forestry and Fisheries.

== See also ==
- List of Champion Trees (South Africa)
- List of individual trees
