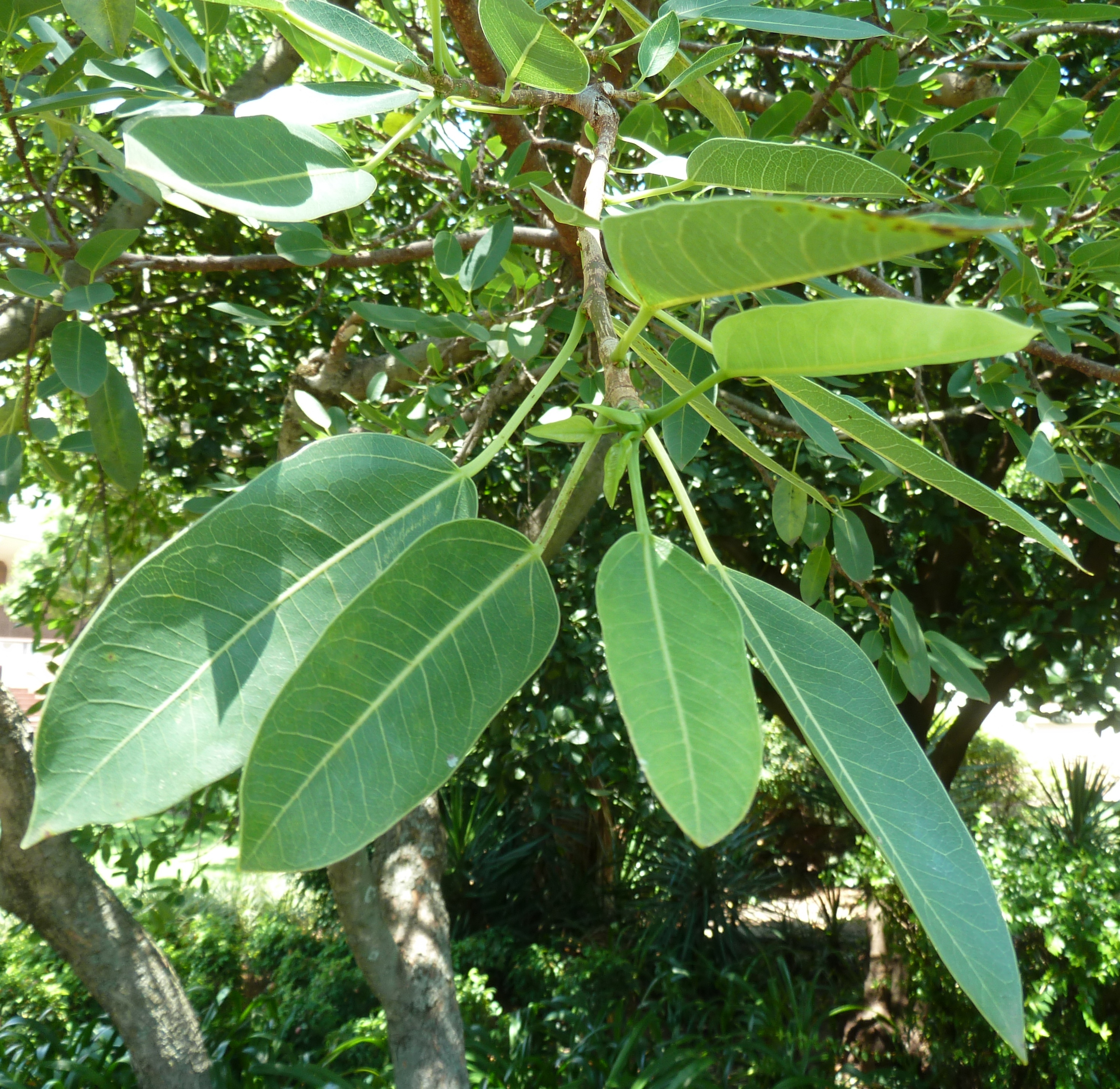
- In Pretoria, South Africa

Scientific classification
- Kingdom: Plantae
- Clade: Tracheophytes
- Clade: Angiosperms
- Clade: Eudicots
- Clade: Rosids
- Order: Rosales
- Family: Moraceae
- Genus: Ficus
- Species: F. salicifolia

Binomial name
- Ficus salicifolia Vahl

Synonyms
- Ficus ambiguum Forssk.; Ficus cordata subsp. salicifolia (Vahl) C.C.Berg; Ficus eucalyptoides Batt. & Trab.; Ficus indica Forssk.; Ficus neriifolia A.Rich.; Ficus pretoriae Burtt Davy; Ficus salicifolia var. australis Warb.; Ficus salicifolia f. eucalyptoides (Batt. & Trab.) Maire; Ficus salicifolia var. teloukat (Batt. & Trab.) Maire; Ficus taab Forssk.; Ficus teloukat Batt. & Trab.; Urostigma salicifolium (Vahl) Miq.

= Ficus salicifolia =

Species or subspecies of Afrotropical fig

The Wonderboom (Ficus salicifolia) is a species of evergreen fig that ranges from the KwaZulu-Natal midlands northwards to tropical East Africa, the Saharan mountains, Arabian Peninsula, and Iran. It grows especially on outcrops, rocky hillsides and along cliffs fringing water courses and may rarely grow up to 10 m (33 ft) tall, and acquire a leafy spreading crown.

== Description ==
The elliptic-oblong, leathery leaves of about 7 to 10 cm (2.8 to 3.9 in) long, are carried on long petioles, and are often noticeably folded along the midrib. The leaf sides are almost parallel and clear net-veining is visible on the lamina. Leaves are brittle and have a characteristic smell when broken or bruised. The leaves are toxic and cause nervous disorders or even deaths in cattle.

The small, smooth figs are carried on short stalks and measure about 4–6 mm (5/32–1/4 in) in diameter. They are massed along the branchlets in the leaf axils, and change from white to yellowish-red and spotted as they ripen. The figs are eaten by birds and mammals.

=== Similar species ===
It may be confused with the similar but deciduous Ficus ingens which grows in similar habitat. The latter has somewhat larger, white to purple figs, and deep red fresh foliage. The Wonderboom fig is sometimes deemed a race of Ficus cordata, i.e. F. c. subsp. salicifolia (Vahl) C.C.Berg, though the latter species has yellowish sessile figs and a more westerly distribution.

== Distribution and habitat ==
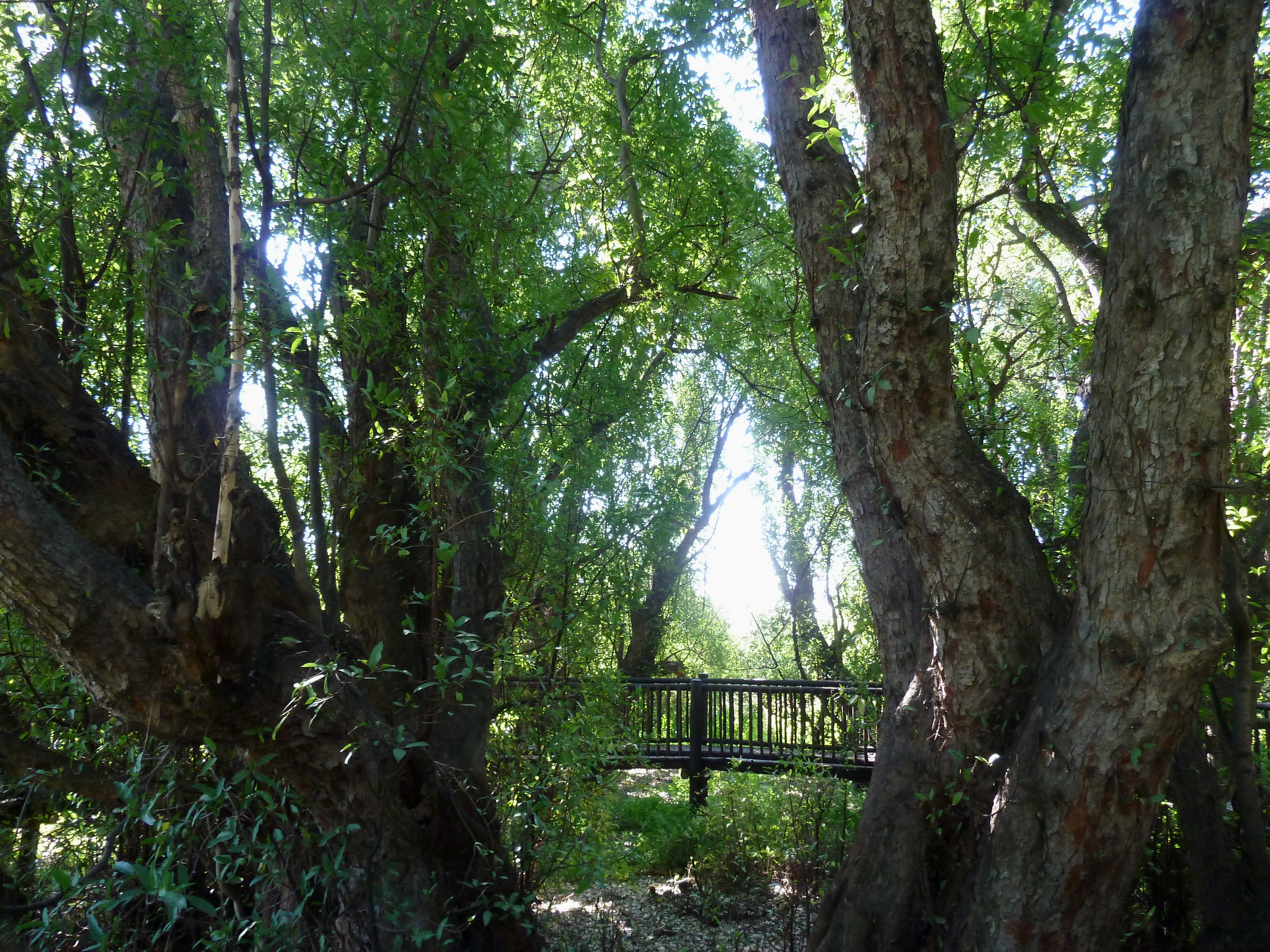
Trees of the Wonderboom grove

It occurs in the Saharo-montane woodlands of the Tassili n'Ajjer, the Hoggar, Aïr and Tibesti mountains, the Kerkour Nourene massif and at Elba mountain in the Red Sea Hills. It is widespread in the eastern Afrotropics, from southern Arabia and Socotra to the KwaZulu-Natal midlands of South Africa.

== The Wonderboom grove ==
The species is named after the Wonderboom grove in Pretoria, that has spread from a central bole that was carbon dated to about 1,000 years old. The Wonderboom is an extraordinary specimen for its size and structure, and its drooping branches are continuing to root and form new trees. Their branches reach about 23 metres (75 ft) into the sky, and one of the boles has a girth of 5.5 metres (18 ft).

== Ecology ==
The pollinator wasp is Platyscapa awekei Wiebes., while non-pollinating wasps include Otitesella serrata Mayr and Otitesella pseudoserrata van Noort.

== Gallery ==
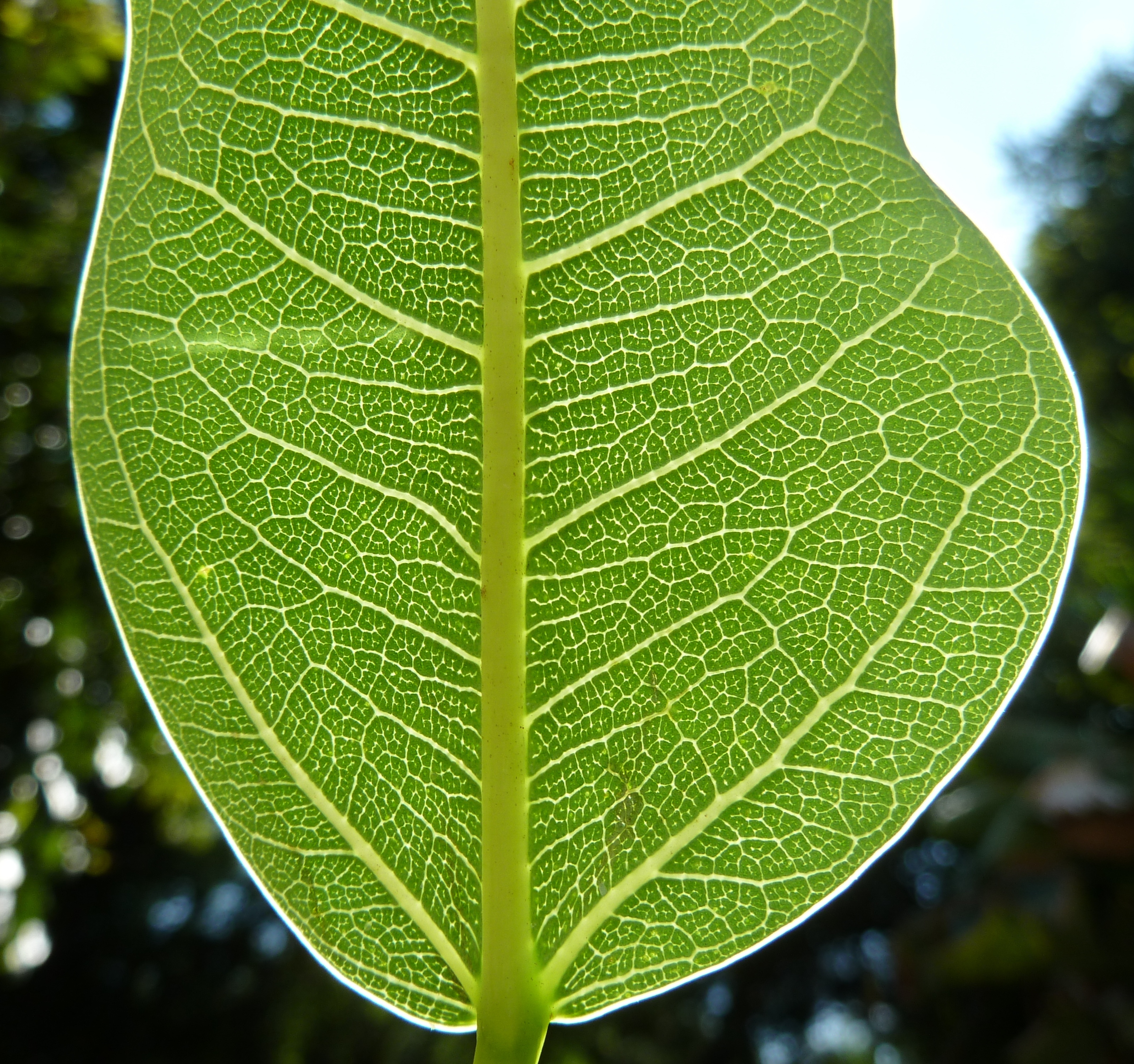
Diagnostic rounded leaf base, regular lateral venation and unbranched, curved basal pair

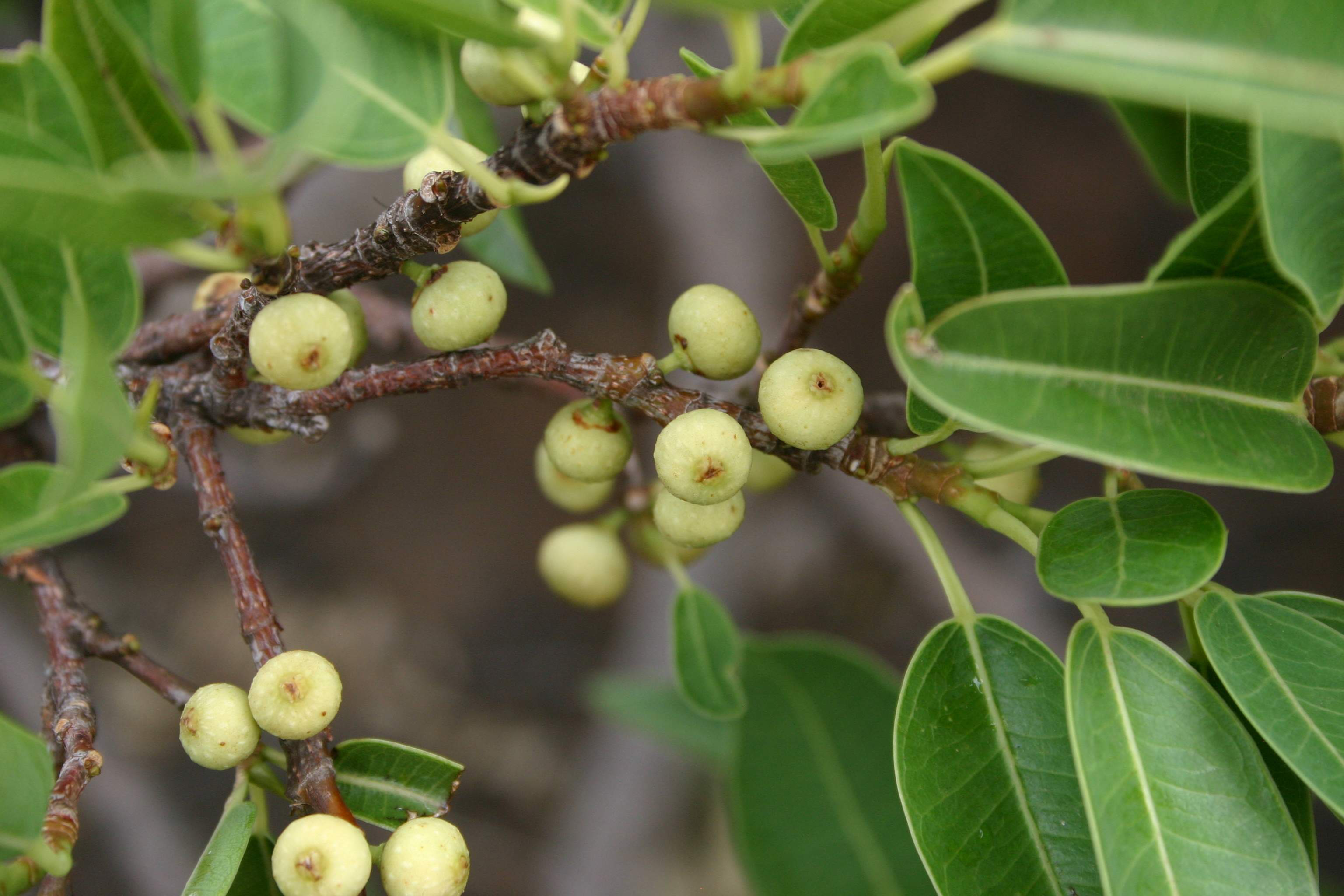
The figs on short stalks

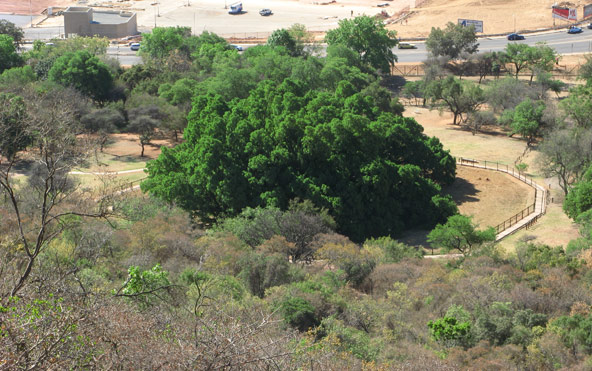
The Wonderboom grove near Pretoria
