= Hoërskool Overkruin =

Location
- 127 Braam Pretorius; Pretoria, Gauteng, 0129; South Africa
- 25°41′05″S 28°12′35″E

Information
- Former names: Hoërskool Sinoville
- School type: Public school
- Motto: Kyk Ver (Look Far)
- Religious affiliation: Christianity
- Established: 1974; 52 years ago
- Principal: P.J. Nel
- Grades: 8–12
- Gender: Boys & Girls
- Age: 14 to 18
- Enrollment: 1,270 pupils
- Language: Afrikaans and English language
- Campus type: Urban Campus
- Colours: Maroon; White
- Accreditation: Gauteng Department of Education
- Newspaper: Verkyker
- Website: www.overkruin.com

Hoërskool Overkruin is a public Afrikaans and English language-medium high school in Wonderboom, Pretoria, Gauteng, South Africa.

== History ==
Originally named Hoërskool Sinoville, the school was founded on 10 June 1974. It was later renamed to Hoërskool Overkruin and had grown from 408 pupils in 1974 to 1270 by the year 2014.

== Culture ==
- Choir
- Performance Arts
- Photography
- Public Speaking
- Music
- Art
- First-Aid

== Sport ==
- Athletics
- Cricket
- Chess
- Golf
- Hockey (Girls & Boys)
- Mountain Bike
- Netball
- Rugby
- Softball
- Sevens Rugby
- Soccer
- Swimming
- Table Tennis
- Tennis

== Headmasters ==
- 1974–1982 : M.S. Mulder
- 1983–1987 : S.A.V. Coetzee
- 1988–2008 : J.M. Theunissen
- 2009–2025 : P.J. Nel
- 2026–present: H. Haasbroek

== Subjects ==
- Afrikaans Home Language
- Afrikaans First Additional Language
- English Home Language
- English First Additional Language
- Mathematics
- Mathematical Literacy
- Technical Mathematics
- Technical Sciences
- Physical Sciences
- Life Sciences
- Mechanics
- Engineering graphics and design
- Visual Arts
- Music
- German
- Tourism
- Accounting
- Robotics
- Consumer Studies
- Business Studies
- Technology
- Geography
- History
- Life Orientation
- Computer Application Technology
- Information Technology
