= Wonderboom Nature Reserve =

Nature Reserve in Pretoria, South Africa

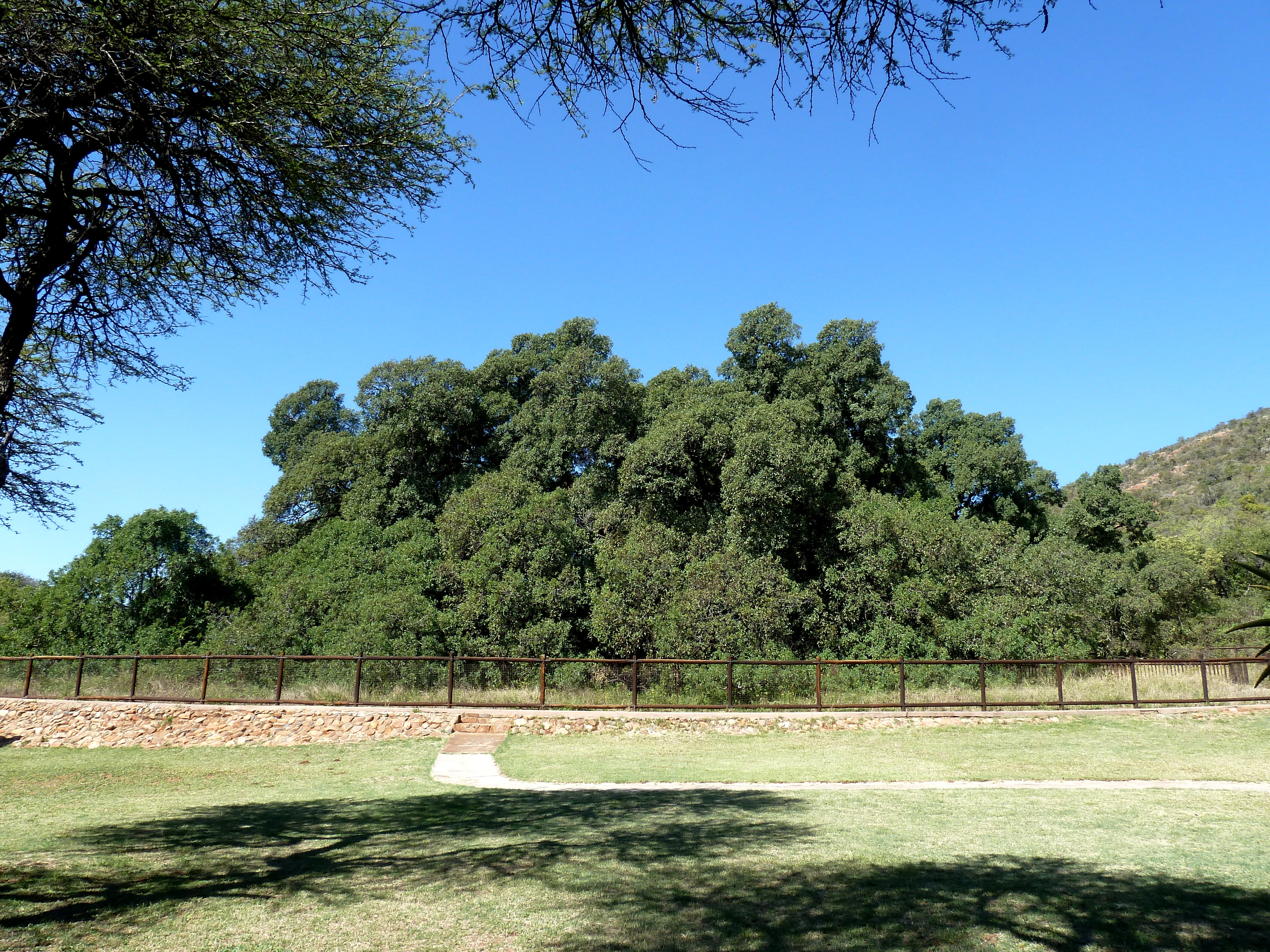
- The Wonderboom grove
- Interactive map of Wonderboom Nature Reserve
- Location: Gauteng
- Nearest city: Pretoria
- Coordinates: 25°41′13″S 28°11′30″E
- Area: 200
- Administrator: City of Tshwane Metropolitan Municipality
- Website: Wonderboom Nature Reserve - City of Tshwane

The Wonderboom Nature Reserve (Afrikaans: Wonderboom-natuurreservaat) is a 1 km², 200-hectare reserve that incorporates a section of the Magaliesberg range in the northern portion of the Pretoria metropole, South Africa. Its main attractions are the Wonderboom (Afrikaans for "Marvel tree") near the reserve entrance in Lavender street and the derelict Fort Wonderboompoort on the crest of the Magaliesberg, that was constructed towards the end of the nineteenth century, during the Second Boer War. The latter is reached by following the steep, paved walkway that leads from the picnic area to the summit. The vicinity of the fort ruins also afford sweeping views of the city, whose council declared the area around the Wonderboom and both banks of the Apies River a reserve on 28 December 1949.

== Wonderboom ==
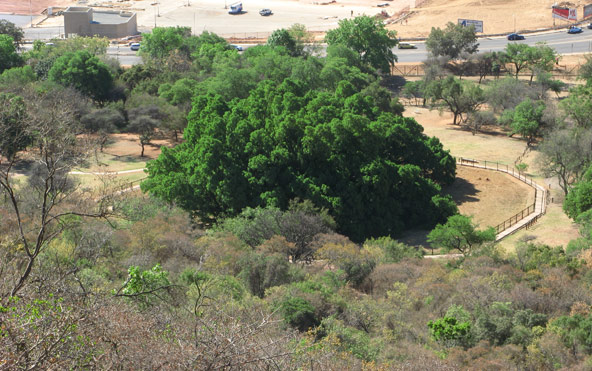
The Wonderboom grove from a trail on the neighbouring hill

The well-known 'Wonderboom' (Afrikaans: 'Wonder tree') is a dense grove of parent and daughter trees of the species Ficus salicifolia, that descended from a central bole of about a thousand years old. It is situated at the northern base of the Magaliesberg, and two circular walkways currently protect it from pedestrian traffic around its trunk and roots. As it has grown, its outlying branches have rooted themselves around the parent tree. This has repeated until there are now three layers of daughter trees encircling the mother fig, with thirteen distinct trunks, covering a 50m² (1.5 ha) area. The mother trunk is 4 m in circumference and 20 m high. Apart from its unusual height for a wild tree of this species, its method of reproduction is a rare natural phenomenon.

The tree was so remarkable that the original inhabitants of the Magaliesberge considered it sacred, especially after a chieftain was buried there. In August 1836, Hendrik Potgieter and his fellow Voortrekkers passing through and gave the tree its name. Later, other Trekkers pitched their tent there, making it a notable landmark in Afrikaner history. For many years, the Day of the Vow was celebrated in its shade.

Until part of the original tree burned in an 1870 fire, a thousand people could sit in the tree's shade. According to records, the tree was also large enough to leave in its shadow twenty-two ox-wagons with twenty oxen in front of each.

The tree was placed under quarantine in 1985 after it was afflicted by a fungal disease, and then fenced to prevent it from spreading. Once the fungus was eradicated, the quarantine was lifted in 2003.

== Other features ==
Other features of the Wonderboom Nature Reserve include a Stone-Age site that has produced the largest single accumulation of Neolithic tools ever found in South Africa and an Iron-Age site. Larger game species such as impala and zebra roam the reserve, as do monkeys, and a breeding pair of black eagles have raised chicks in the reserve since 2010, feeding on the rock hyraxes living in caves on the banks of the Apies.

== Hours ==
The reserve has picnic areas and can be visited between 7:00 AM and 6:00 PM (exit only after 4:00 PM)

== Biodiversity ==
=== Birds ===
There are at least 200 species of birds, including:

- Verreaux's eagle
- Black eagle

=== Fauna ===
- Impala
- Porcupine
- Rock hyrax
- Zebra (Four zebras were introduced from the Kruger National Park in 1965)
- Trachylepis varia Mochlus sundevallii

=== Flora ===
- Dichrostachys cinerea
- Ficus salicifolia
- Pappea capensis
- Sclerocarya birrea subsp. afra
- Searsia lancea
- Searsia leptodictya
- Acacia nilotica
- Ziziphus mucronata

== See also ==
- List of Champion Trees (South Africa)
- List of individual trees
