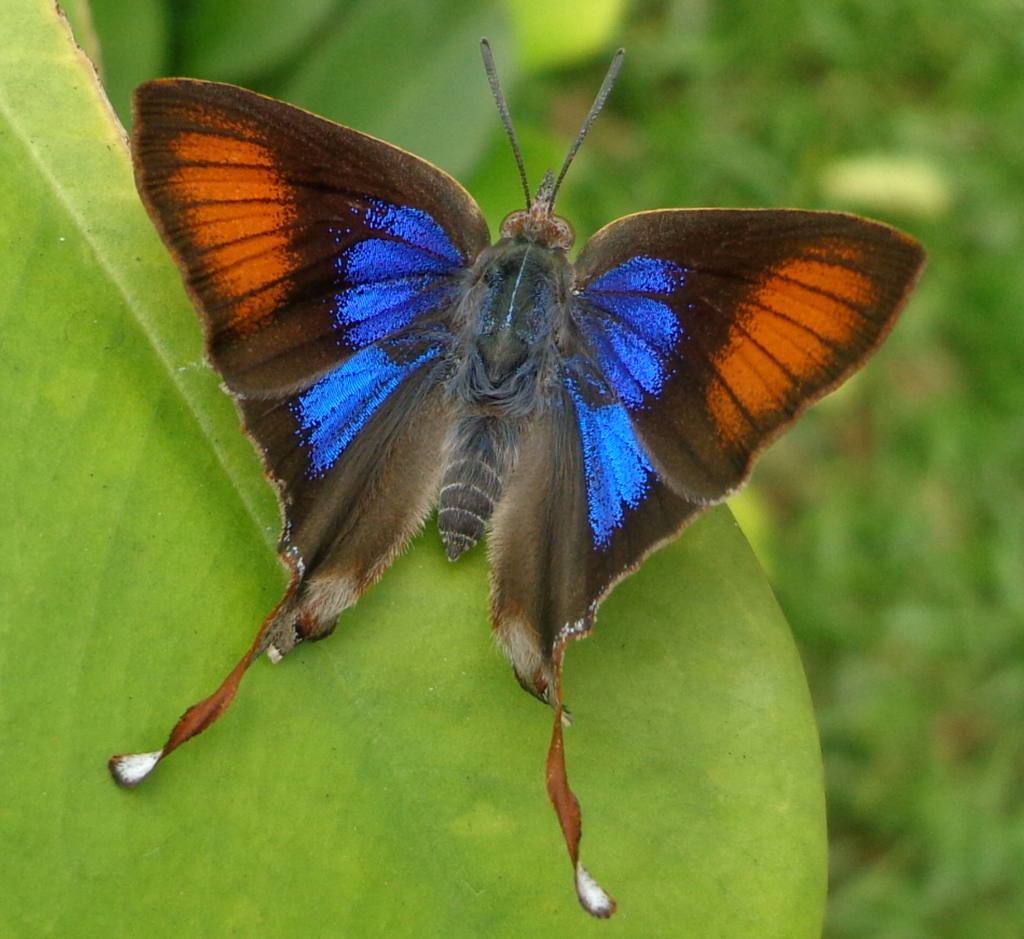
- Nominate subspecies, Nigeria

Conservation status
- Least Concern (IUCN 3.1)

Scientific classification
- Kingdom: Animalia
- Phylum: Arthropoda
- Clade: Pancrustacea
- Class: Insecta
- Order: Lepidoptera
- Family: Lycaenidae
- Genus: Myrina
- Species: M. silenus

Binomial name
- Myrina silenus (Fabricius, 1775)

Synonyms
- Papilio silenus Fabricius, 1775; Papilio alcides Cramer, [1776]; Myrina ficedula Trimen, 1879; Papilio corax Stoll, 1781; Myrina silenus deserticola Stempffer, 1969; Myrina silenus f. nzoiae Stoneham, 1937

= Myrina silenus =

Common fig-tree blue

Species of butterfly

Myrina silenus, the common fig-tree blue, is a butterfly of the family Lycaenidae. It is found in Sub-Saharan Africa, southern Arabia and northern Oman.

== Description ==
The wingspan is 26.5–34 mm for males and 33–41 mm for females. Adults are on wing year-round with peaks from September to October and from April to June in the eastern part of the range.

== Habitat and behavior ==
The larvae feed on Ficus species, including F. capensis, F. cordata, F. sur, F. pumila and F. ingens.

== Subspecies ==
- M. s. silenus

Range: Senegal, Gambia, Guinea-Bissau, Guinea, Sierra Leone, Liberia, Ivory Coast, Ghana, Togo, Benin, Nigeria, Cameroon, Congo, Angola, DRC, Chad, Sudan, Uganda, north-western Zambia

- M. s. nzoiae d'Abrera, 1980

Range: Ethiopia, Yemen, Saudi Arabia, United Arab Emirates, northern Oman, western and northern Kenya

- M. s. ficedula (Trimen, 1879)

Range: southern Kenya, Tanzania, Zambia, Mozambique, Zimbabwe, Botswana, Namibia: Caprivi, Eswatini, South Africa: Limpopo, Mpumalanga, North West, Gauteng, Free State, KwaZulu-Natal, Eastern Cape and Western Cape provinces

- M. s. penningtoni Dickson & Stephen, 1971

Range: western South Africa: Western Cape to Northern Cape

- M. s. suzannae Larsen & Plowes, 1991

Range: northern Namibia

Torben Larsen developed a species numbering system for his 2005 publication Butterflies of West Africa. The nominate subspecies is #354. The 'Larsen' numbers have since been used with permission in A Sharp Eye on Butterflies of Ghana.
