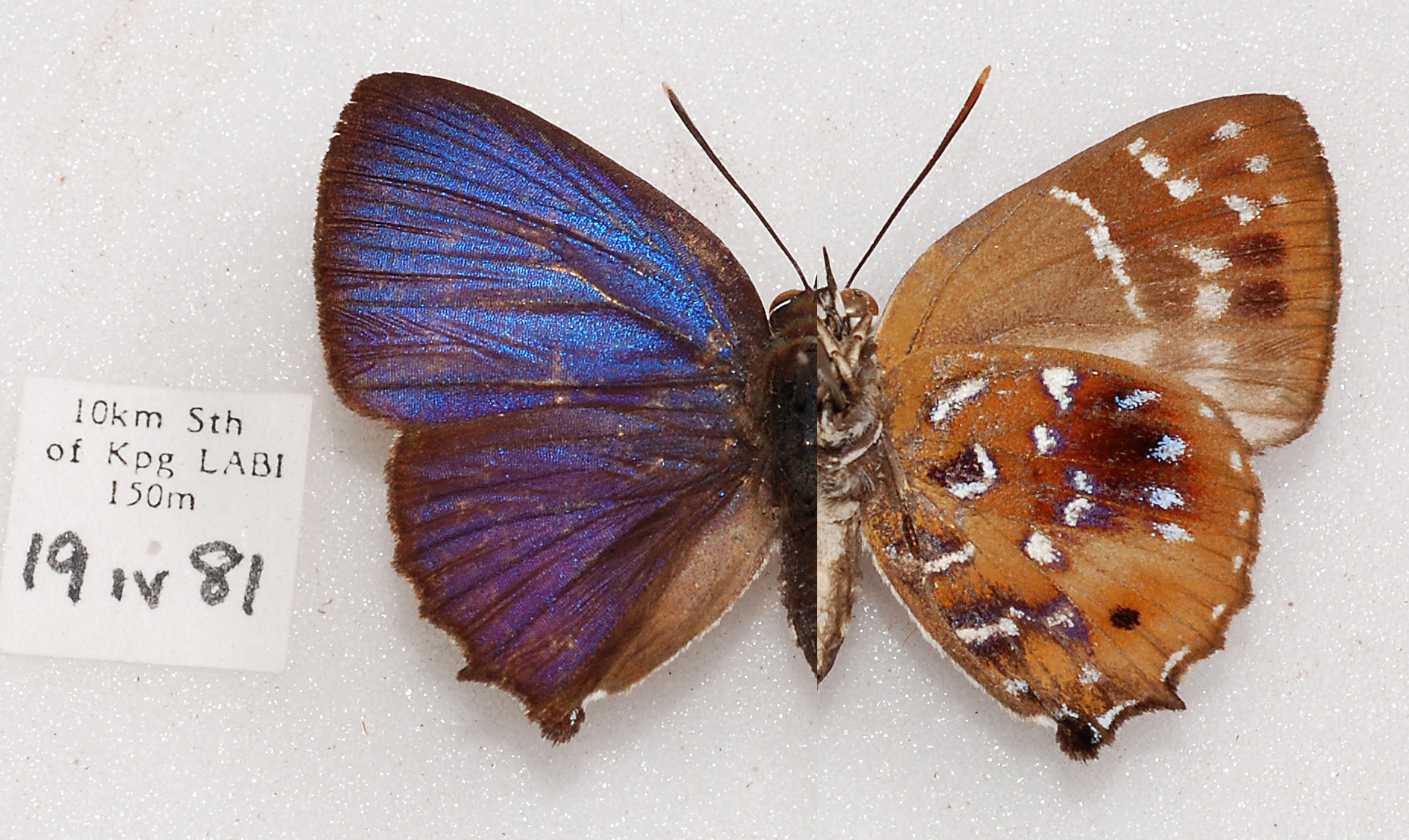
- Iraota distanti (Female)
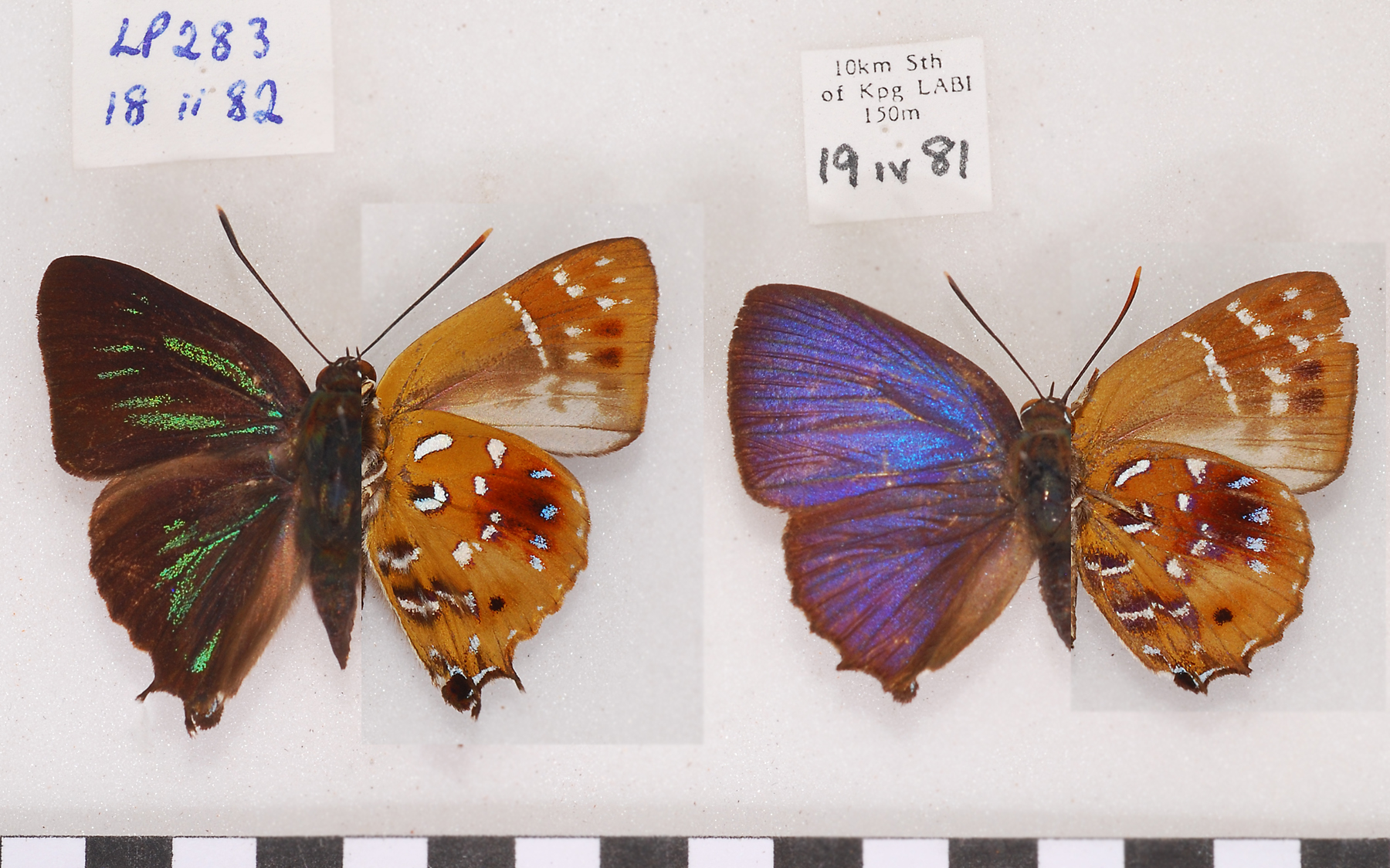
- Iraota distanti nileia

Scientific classification
- Domain: Eukaryota
- Kingdom: Animalia
- Phylum: Arthropoda
- Class: Insecta
- Order: Lepidoptera
- Family: Lycaenidae
- Genus: Iraota
- Species: I. d. nileia

Binomial name
- Iraota distanti nileia Staudinger, 1889.

= Iraota distanti =

Distant's silverstreak

Species of butterfly

Iraota distanti, the Distant's silverstreak, is a species of lycaenid or blue butterfly with at least two subspecies (the nominate and nileia (Fruhstorfer, 1904). It is found in Peninsular Thailand, Malaya, Singapore, Sumatra, Mentawi and Borneo (nileia)

== Description in Seitz ==
The anal part of the hindwing has a rounded margin; the blue above extending much farther towards the margin than in any form of timoleon, the under surface exhibits a bright ruddle-red tinge and all the white spots are small and equably distributed across the surface of the wings.In nileia the males have a bright ruddle-red tinge above and all the white spots are very small and equably distributed across the surface of the wings.

== Etymology ==
The name honours William Distant.

== Gallery ==
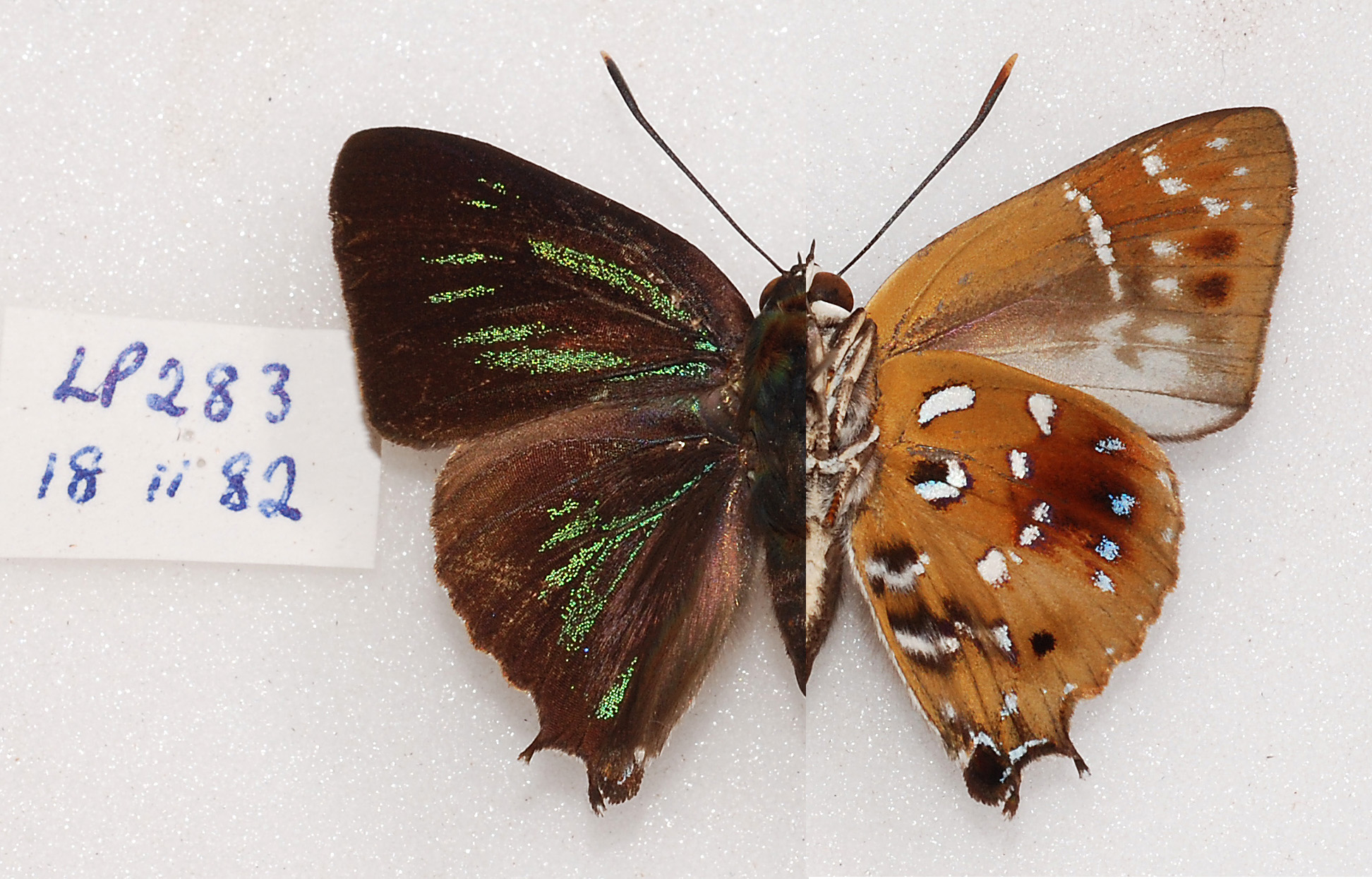
Male, composite image from Brunei

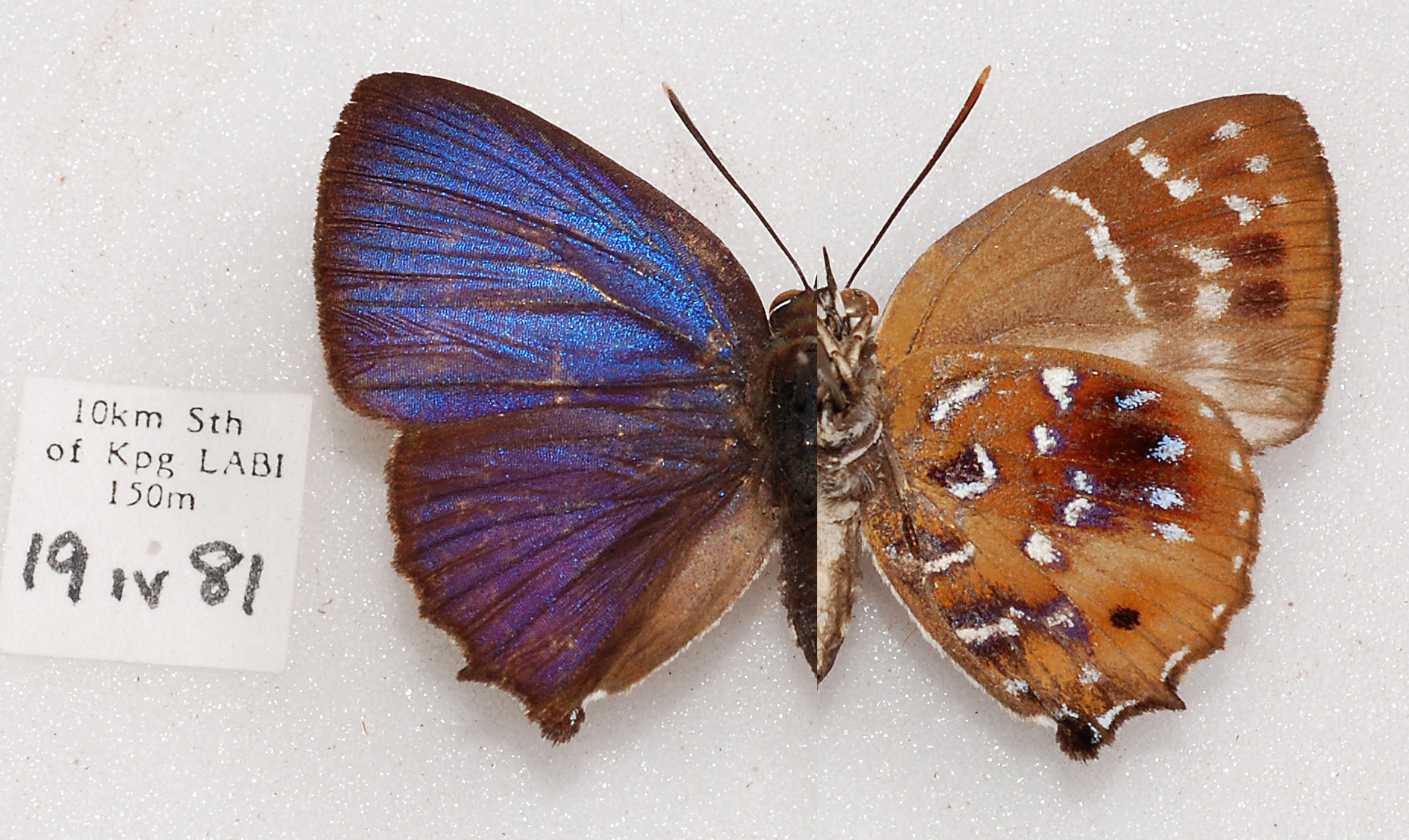
Female, composite image from Brunei
