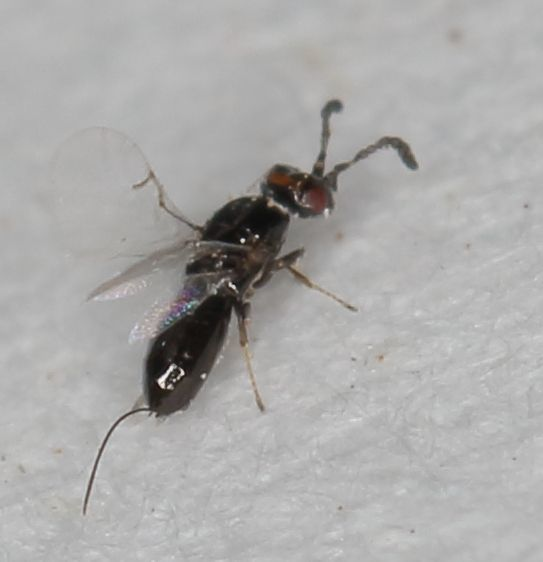
- Female Platyscapa soraria

Scientific classification
- Domain: Eukaryota
- Kingdom: Animalia
- Phylum: Arthropoda
- Class: Insecta
- Order: Hymenoptera
- Family: Agaonidae
- Genus: Platyscapa
- Species: P. soraria

Binomial name
- Platyscapa soraria Wiebes, 1980

= Platyscapa soraria =

Species of wasp

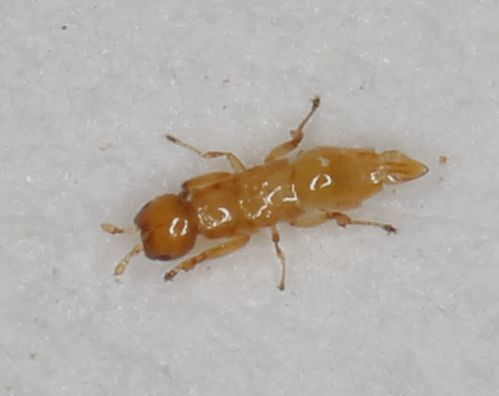
Male Platyscapa soraria

Platyscapa soraria is a species of fig wasp; it is the pollinator of Ficus ingens.

== Description ==
Female: Blackish. Head shorter than wide, antenna with 11 segments. Fore wing 1.3 mm long; submarginal, marginal, stigmal and postmarginal vein ratio of about 22:6:5:4; length of hind tarsus twice that of tibia. Length (head, mesosoma and metasoma) 1.4 mm; ovipositor length 0.8 mm.

== Range ==
Ethiopia, Ivory Coast, Malawi, South Africa, Tanzania, Zambia, Zimbabwe, but probably also present in the entire range of the host fig, Ficus ingens.

== Habitat ==
Woodland; Ficus ingens is often found in rocky places.
