= Platyscapa clavigera =

Scientific classification
- Kingdom: Animalia
- Phylum: Arthropoda
- Class: Insecta
- Order: Hymenoptera
- Family: Agaonidae
- Genus: Platyscapa
- Species: P. clavigera

Binomial name
- Platyscapa clavigera (Mayr 1885)

Species of wasp

Platyscapa clavigera is a species of fig wasp; it is the pollinator of Ficus elastica.

== Description ==
Female: has shiny brown body that is smooth and glabrous, with paler legs. The antennae are 11-segmented, with flattened scapes. The funicular segments are cup shaped. The ovipositor is longer than the gaster. The hypopygium has a blunt spine. The post marginal vein of the forewing is almost equal in length with the stigmal vein. Pollen pockets are present on the side of the thorax. In the fore coxae, coxal combs are absent.

Male: Body is a shiny golden yellow with a darker head and black eyes. The head is shorter than its width and the face is transverse in front. Mandibles are bidentate. They have deep antennal grooves, with the final segments of the antenna fused to form a club. The meso and metanotum are more or less fused.

== Range ==
Reported from Meghalaya, northeast India, and Singapore, but possibly present over the native range of the host fig, Ficus elastica.

== Habitat ==
Forest; Ficus elastica is often found in evergreen forest.
