= Myrina anettae =

Scientific classification
- Domain: Eukaryota
- Kingdom: Animalia
- Phylum: Arthropoda
- Class: Insecta
- Order: Lepidoptera
- Family: Lycaenidae
- Genus: Myrina
- Species: M. anettae

Binomial name
- Myrina anettae de Fleury, 1924

Species of butterfly

Myrina anettae is a butterfly in the family Lycaenidae. It can be found in Guinea, Ghana and eastern Uganda. The habitat consists of savanna.
