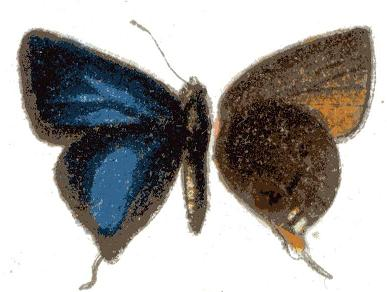

Scientific classification
- Domain: Eukaryota
- Kingdom: Animalia
- Phylum: Arthropoda
- Class: Insecta
- Order: Lepidoptera
- Family: Lycaenidae
- Genus: Myrina
- Species: M. sharpei

Binomial name
- Myrina sharpei Bethune-Baker, 1906

= Myrina sharpei =

Species of butterfly

Myrina sharpei, the Sharpe's fig tree blue, is a butterfly in the family Lycaenidae. It is found in the Republic of the Congo, the Democratic Republic of the Congo, Kenya, Uganda and Tanzania. The habitat consists of primary forest.

The larvae feed on Ficus capensis.

== Subspecies ==
- Myrina sharpei sharpei (Democratic Republic of the Congo: Lualaba, Uganda, Kenya: west to the Kakamega district, north-western Tanzania)
- Myrina sharpei fontainei Stempffer, 1961 (Democratic Republic of the Congo: Uele)
