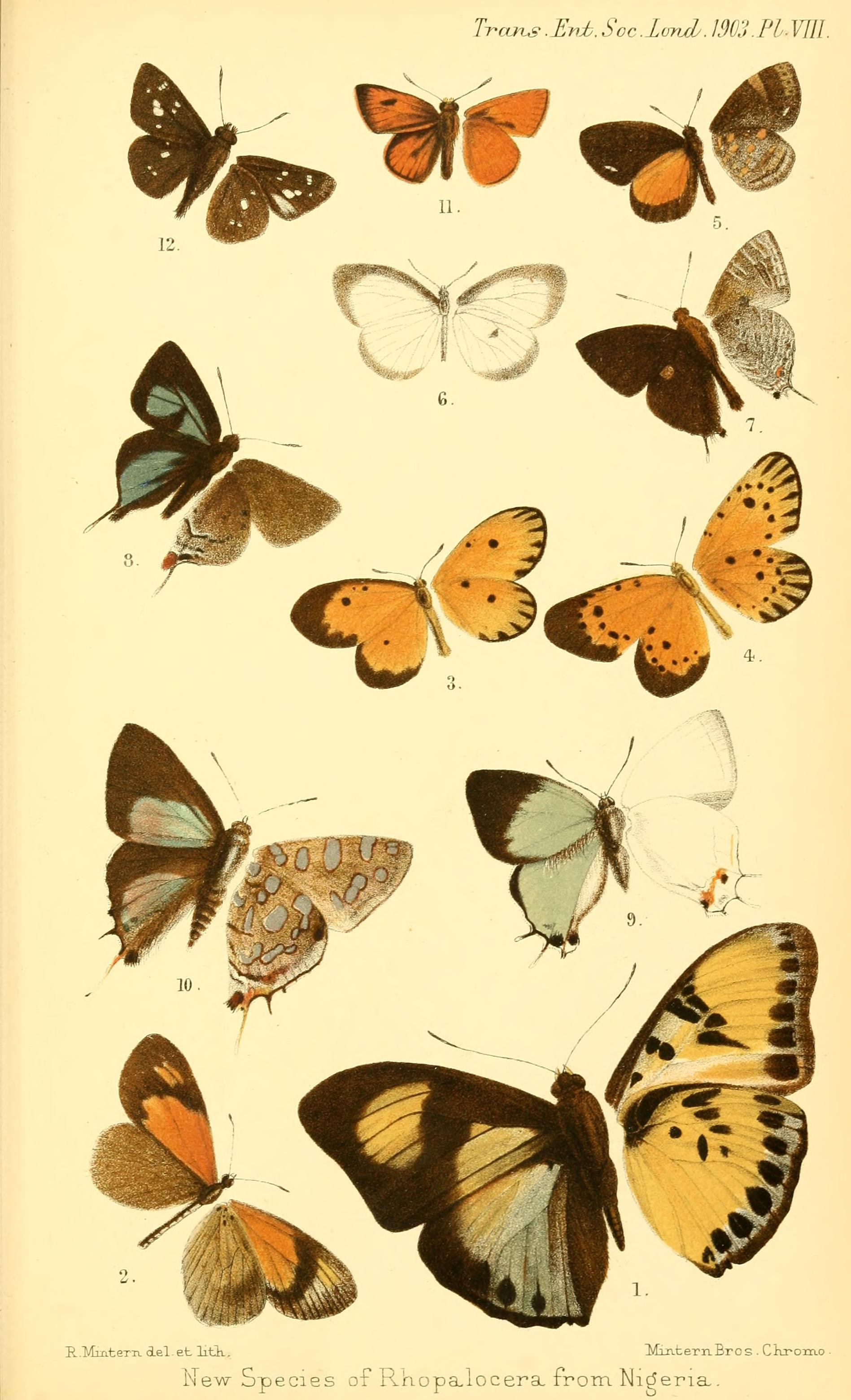
- Figure 8

Scientific classification
- Domain: Eukaryota
- Kingdom: Animalia
- Phylum: Arthropoda
- Class: Insecta
- Order: Lepidoptera
- Family: Lycaenidae
- Genus: Myrina
- Species: M. subornata

Binomial name
- Myrina subornata Lathy, 1903

= Myrina subornata =

Species of butterfly

Myrina subornata, the West African fig-tree blue or small fig blue, is a butterfly in the family Lycaenidae. It is found in Senegal, Guinea-Bissau, Burkina Faso, Guinea, Ghana, Nigeria, Cameroon, the Republic of the Congo, Uganda, Sudan and possibly Kenya. The habitat consists of savanna.

Adults suck the juices of small fermenting fruits.

The larvae feed on Ficus species. The larvae are tended by the ant species Pheidole rotundata.

== Subspecies ==
- Myrina subornata subornata (eastern Senegal, Guinea-Bissau, Burkina Faso, Guinea, northern Ghana, central and northern Nigeria, northern Cameroon, Congo, Uganda)
- Myrina subornata kacheleba d'Abrera, 1980 (Kenya: west to Kacheleba and the Suk Mountains)
- Myrina subornata nuba Talbot, 1935 (Sudan)
