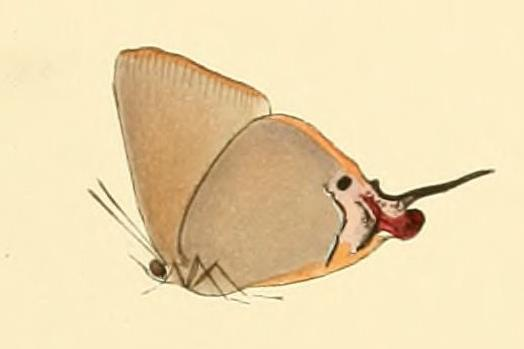

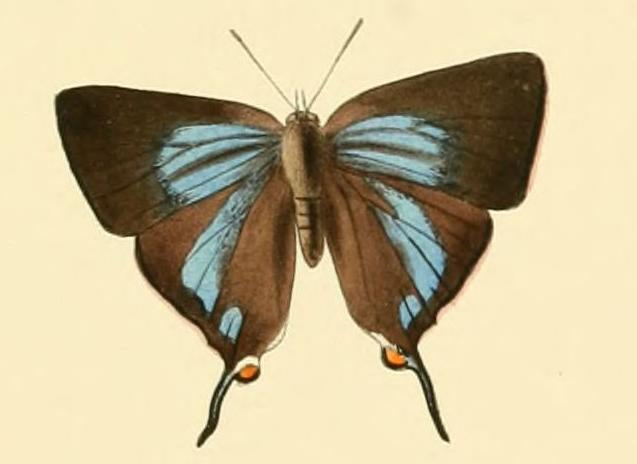

Scientific classification
- Domain: Eukaryota
- Kingdom: Animalia
- Phylum: Arthropoda
- Class: Insecta
- Order: Lepidoptera
- Family: Lycaenidae
- Genus: Myrina
- Species: M. dermaptera

Binomial name
- Myrina dermaptera (Wallengren, 1857)

Synonyms
- Loxura dermaptera Wallengren, 1857

= Myrina dermaptera =

Species of butterfly

Myrina dermaptera, the lesser fig-tree blue or scarce fig-tree blue, is a butterfly of the family Lycaenidae. It is found in Sub-Saharan Africa, southern Arabia and northern Oman.

== Description ==
The wingspan is 26–32 mm for males and 30–38 mm for females. Adults are on wing year round with strong peaks in November and from April to June.

== Habitat and behavior ==
The males are highly territorial, and patrol their chosen spots around fig trees. They are noted to perform in an unusual hovering and spiraling aerial display, which seems as a form of threat or dominance.

The larvae feed on Ficus species, including F. sur, F. thonningii and F. natalensis.

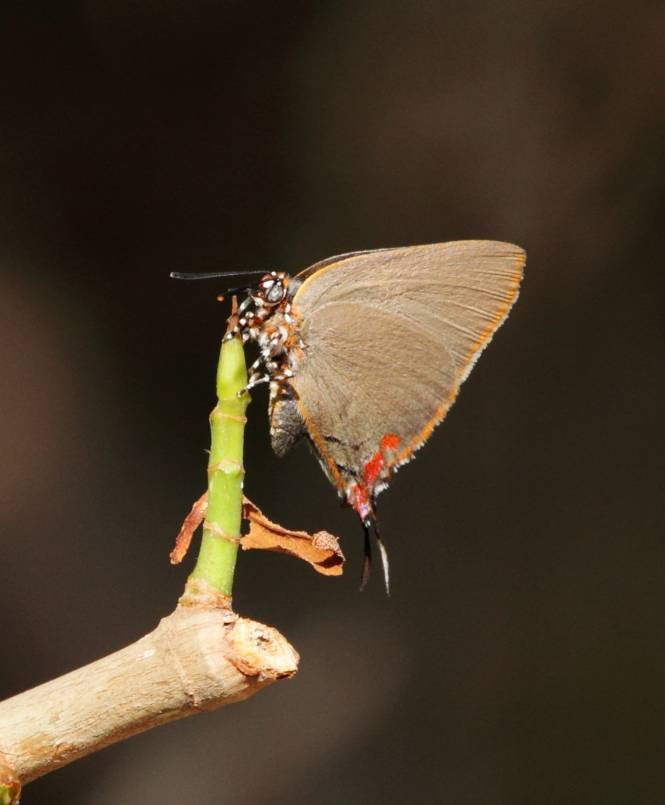
Female at uMhlanga Rocks, KwaZulu-Natal

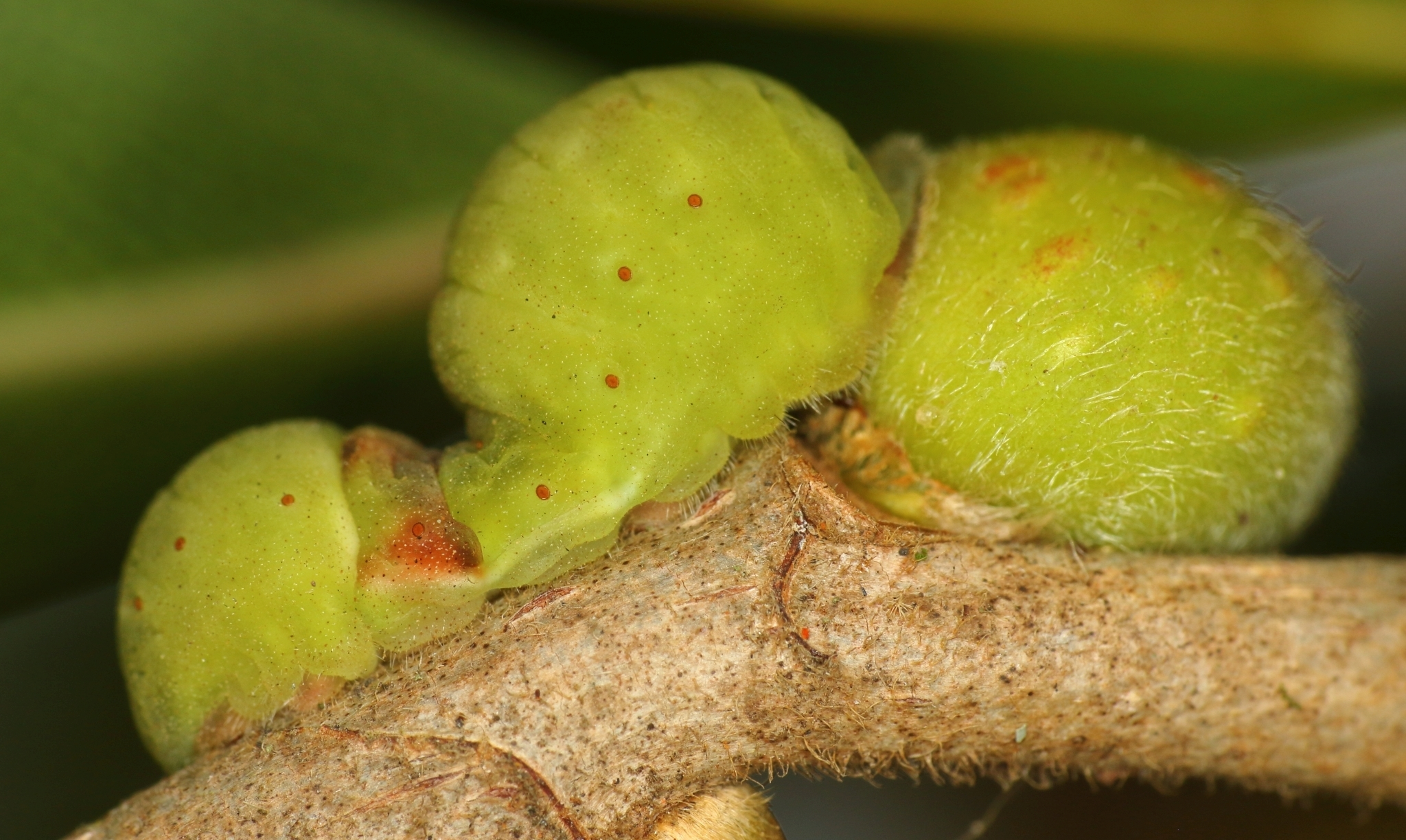
Caterpillar at Pietermaritzburg, KwaZulu-Natal

== Subspecies ==
- Myrina dermaptera dermaptera (Eastern Cape to KwaZulu-Natal and Mpumalanga and Limpopo, southern Mozambique)
- Myrina dermaptera nyassae Talbot, 1935 (Zimbabwe, Malawi, eastern Tanzania to Kenya (Nairobi))
