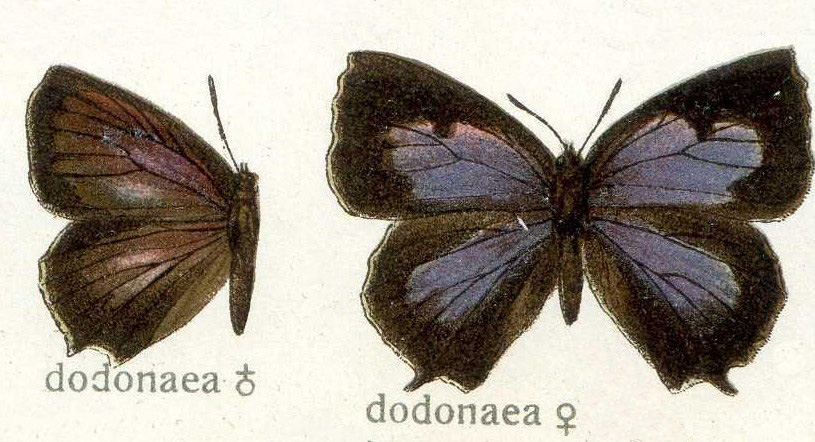
- Amblypodia dodonaea

Scientific classification
- Kingdom: Animalia
- Phylum: Arthropoda
- Clade: Pancrustacea
- Class: Insecta
- Order: Lepidoptera
- Family: Lycaenidae
- Subfamily: Theclinae
- Tribe: Amblypodiini

Genera
- See text

= Amblypodiini =

Tribe of butterflies

The Amblypodiini are a small tribe of butterflies in the family Lycaenidae.

== Genera ==
As not all Theclinae have been assigned to tribes, the following list of genera is preliminary:

- Amblypodia
- Iraota
- Myrina
