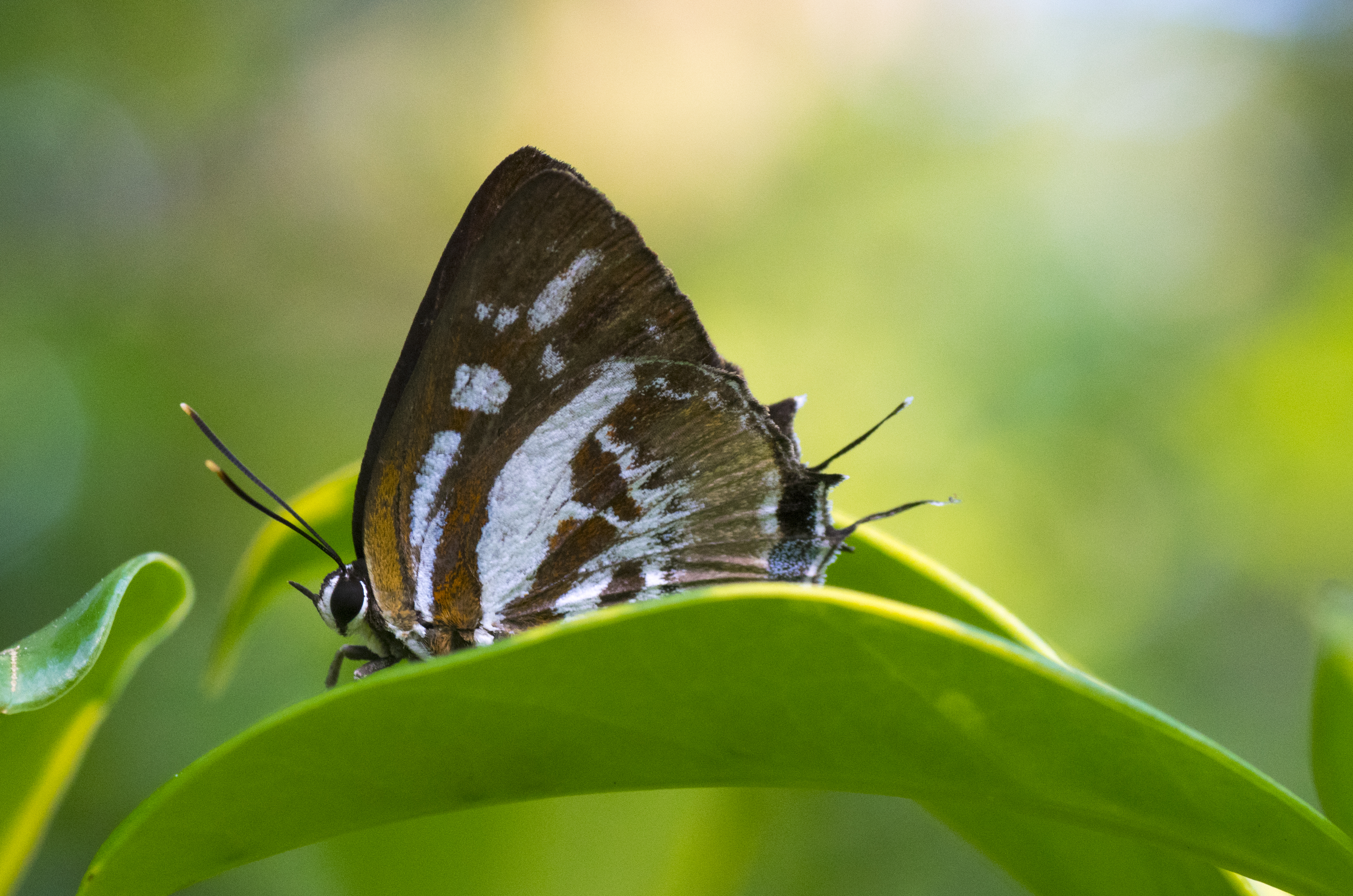
- Iraota rochana boswelliana from Singapore botanic garden

Scientific classification
- Domain: Eukaryota
- Kingdom: Animalia
- Phylum: Arthropoda
- Class: Insecta
- Order: Lepidoptera
- Family: Lycaenidae
- Genus: Iraota
- Species: I. rochana

Binomial name
- Iraota rochana Horsfield, 1829

= Iraota rochana =

Scarce silverstreak

Species of butterfly

Iraota rochana, the scarce silverstreak, is a species of lycaenid or blue butterfly with several subspecies found in Manipur, Myanmar, Java, Borneo, Sumatra, Malaya, Langkawi, Thailand, Singapore, Sulawesi and the Philippines. The species was first described by Thomas Horsfield in 1829.

== Subspecies ==
- Iraota rochana rochana (Horsfield, [1829 ]) Type locality: Indonesia, Java upper surface is light metallic blue, the black distal margin broad.
- Iraota rochana accius Seitz, [1926] Borneo - male above deep blue; grey-brown beneath.
- Iraota rochana austrosuluensis Schröder & Treadaway, 1989. Philippines, Tawitawi.
- Iraota rochana boswelliana Distant, [1885]. West Malaya, India - very abundantly white, ochreous, and blue marked under surface, and above;uni-coloured dark brown females.
- Iraota rochana boudanti Treadaway & Nuyda, 1993. Philippines, Sibutu.
- Iraota rochana garzoni Schröder & Treadaway, 1986. Philippines, Negros.
- Iraota rochana indalawanae Schröder & Treadaway, 1993. Philippines, Balabac.Mollucas
- Iraota rochana johnsoniana Holland, 1890 Celebes - a particularly large form; beneath dark blackish-grey instead of red-brown. The black median band of the hindwing is also distally very broadly bordered with white. The white subcostal streak of the forewing and the subbasal streak of the hindwing are narrower, but the submarginal band of the forewing is more distinct, completer. Typical johnsoniana females show above large blue discal spots; but there are also females being above quite brown.
- Iraota rochana lazarena (Felder, C. & Felder, R., 1862) Philippine Is. (Mindoro)- above not very extensive but nevertheless intensely lustrous blue areas; beneath the ground-colour is very dark trunk-coloured brown, not red-brown .
- Iraota rochana lysippus (Fruhstorfer, 1907) Nias- large posterior (subanal) brown spot of the hindwing, around which the white median band extends in a large bow
- Iraota rochana mangolina (Fruhstorfer, 1912) Moluccas¬ no blue in the basal part of the forewing and a darker, more purely white-marked under surface
- Iraota rochana ottonis (Fruhstorfer, 1907) Philippines, Palawan - small, beneath marked similarly as boswelliana, but the white marking duller, more reduced. —
- Iraota rochana zwickorum Schröder & Treadaway, 2002 Philippines, Mapun Is.

== Gallery ==
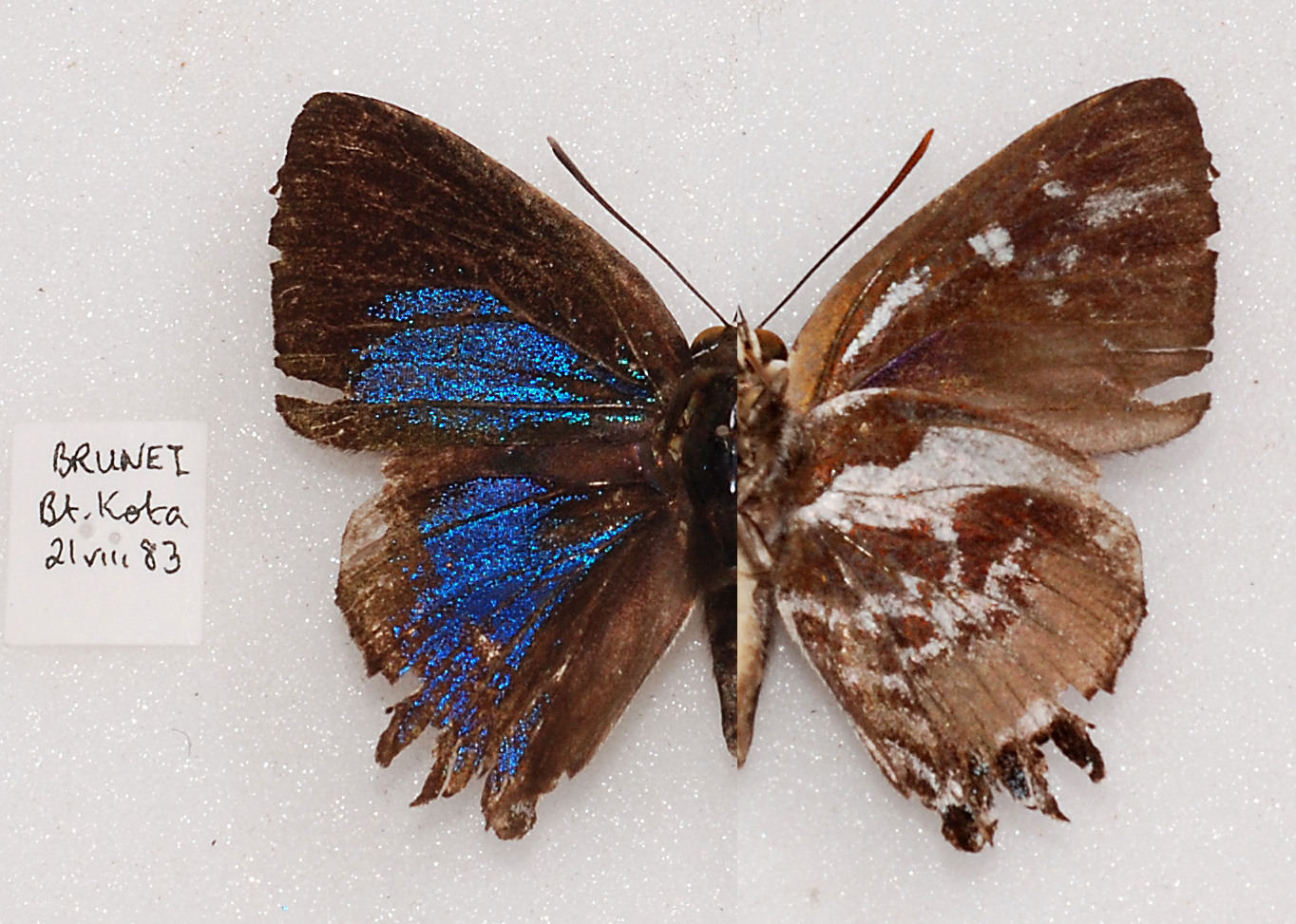
Male from Brunei

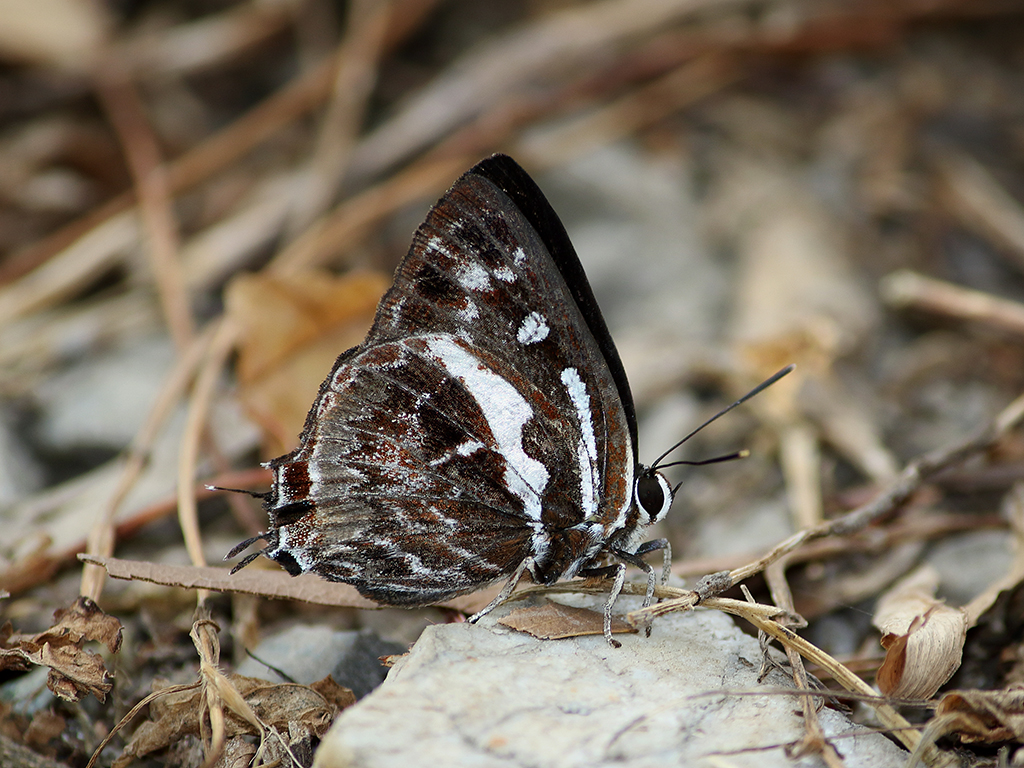
West Bengal, India

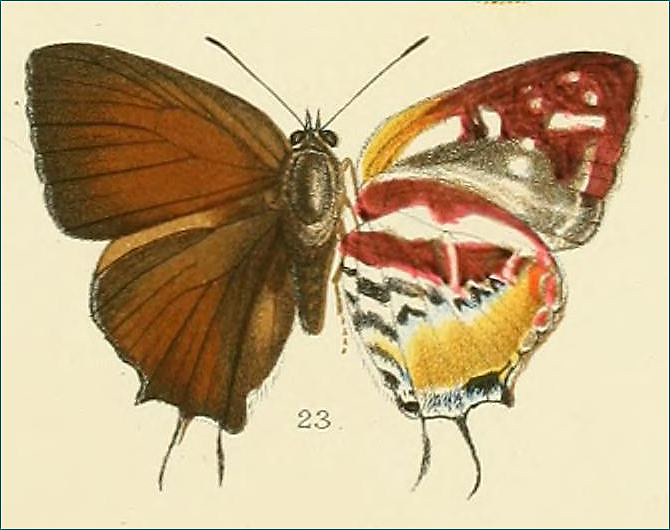
Iraota rochana boswelliana
