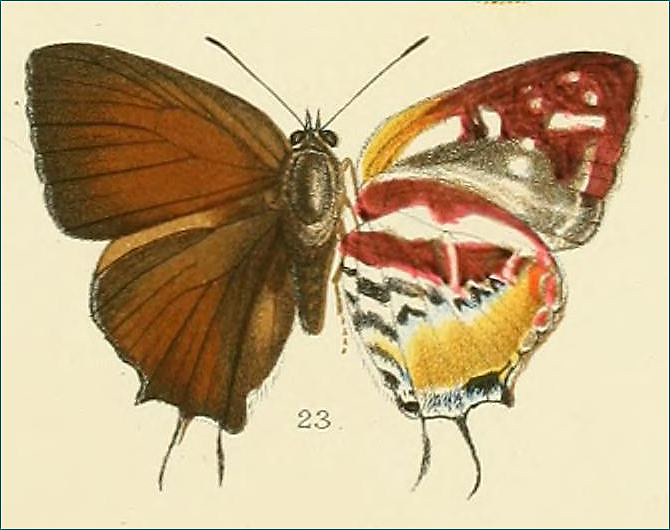
- Iraota rochana boswelliana

Scientific classification
- Domain: Eukaryota
- Kingdom: Animalia
- Phylum: Arthropoda
- Class: Insecta
- Order: Lepidoptera
- Family: Lycaenidae
- Tribe: Amblypodiini
- Genus: Iraota; Moore, 1881

= Iraota =

Butterfly genus in family Lycaenidae

Iraota is a southeast Asian and Indian genus. genus of butterflies in the family Lycaenidae. The genus was erected by Frederic Moore in 1881.

== Species ==
- Iraota abnormis (Moulton, 1911)
- Iraota aurigena Fruhstorfer, 1907
- Iraota distanti (Staudinger, 1889)
- Iraota rochana (Horsfield, [1829]) - scarce silverstreak
- Iraota timoleon (Stoll, [1790]) - silverstreak blue
