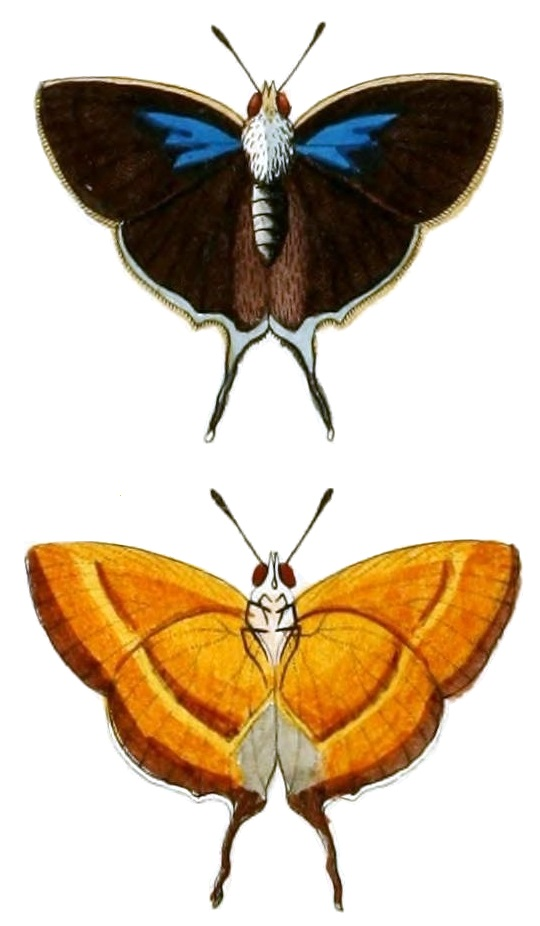
- Myrina silenus from Caspar Stoll's Uitlandsche Kapellen

Scientific classification
- Kingdom: Animalia
- Phylum: Arthropoda
- Class: Insecta
- Order: Lepidoptera
- Family: Lycaenidae
- Tribe: Amblypodiini
- Genus: Myrina; Fabricius, 1807

= Myrina (butterfly) =

Butterfly genus in family Lycaenidae

Myrina is a purely Afrotropical genus of butterfly in the family Lycaenidae containing a total of five species.

== Species ==
- Myrina anettae De Fleury, 1924
- Myrina dermaptera (Wallengren, 1857)
- Myrina sharpei Bethune-Baker, 1906
- Myrina silenus (Fabricius, 1775)
- Myrina subornata Lathy, 1903

== Etymology ==
Early authors often named insects for classical figures. This one is named for Myrina, queen of the Amazons.
