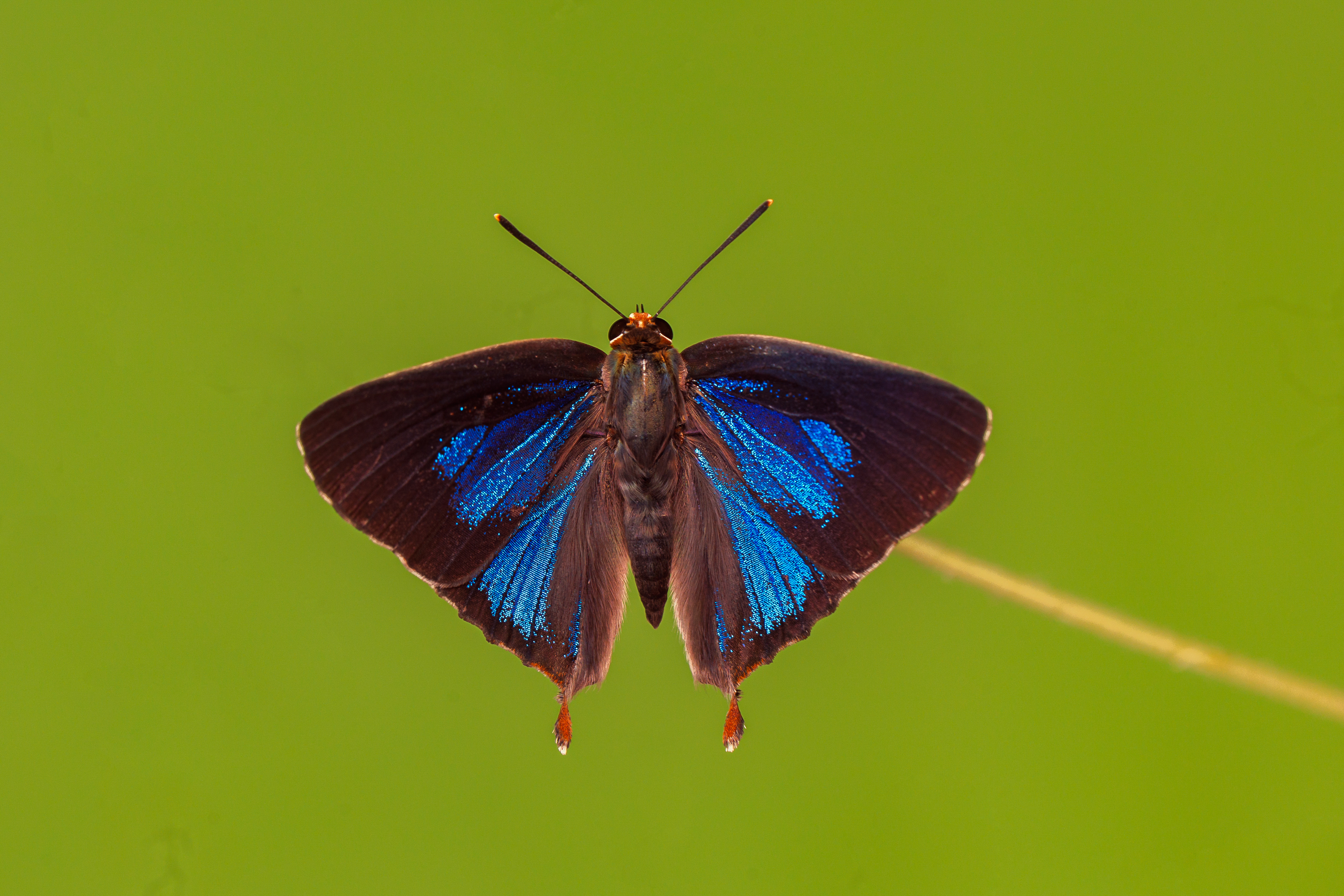

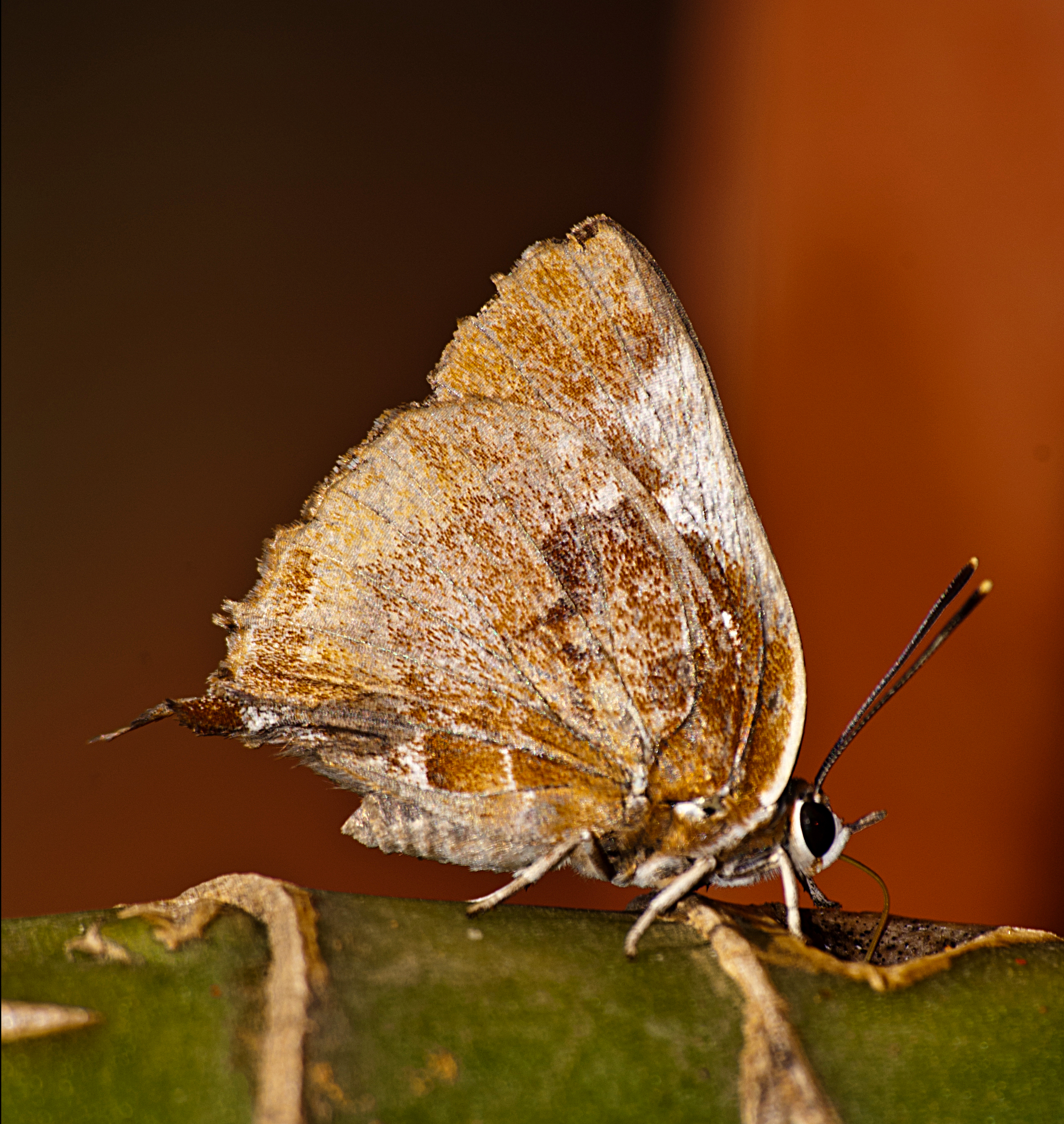

Scientific classification
- Kingdom: Animalia
- Phylum: Arthropoda
- Class: Insecta
- Order: Lepidoptera
- Family: Lycaenidae
- Genus: Iraota
- Species: I. timoleon

Binomial name
- Iraota timoleon Stoll, 1790

= Iraota timoleon =

Silverstreak blue

Species of butterfly

Iraota timoleon, the silverstreak blue, is a species of lycaenid or blue butterfly found in Asia.

== Description ==
Male. Upperside. Forewing black, the basal two-thirds of the lower area of the wing deep metallic blue, varying in extent in different specimens. Hindwing also black, the disc deep metallic blue which also varies in extent, abdominal marginal space pale, a glandular basal patch between veins 7 and 8; tail black, tipped with white. Cilia of both wings black, tipped with white. Underside dark chocolate brown variegated, being paler in parts. Forewing a gradually formed club-sliaped silvery streak in the cell, touching the sub-costal nervure, reaching a little beyond the middle of the cell, a round silvery spot at the end of the cell, a discal series of four spots in a straight line, in pairs, the upper two below the costa, the other two in the middle of the disc, the upper and lower portions of the wing paler than the centre portion. Hindwing with a very prominent, curiously-shaped silvery band, which extends from the base where it is narrow, suddenly broadens, has a point upwards and a lobe downwards, then narrows somewhat and turns upwards and expands into a large lobe near the middle of the costa; a small silvery spot below the band, two angulated, outwardly curved pale whitish indistinct lines, from the abdominal margin across the wing, ante and post medial, also terminal and sub-terminal indistinct whitish lines, anal lobe black, with a long somewhat spatulate tail, black tipped with white at the end of the internal vein. Antennae black, the tips pale orange-red; head and body black above, brown beneath; palpi white beneath, eyes ringed with white. Female. Upperside varying in colour from purplish -brown to bright shining blue, with black borders, varying very much in width in different specimens. Underside like the male, but all the markings larger and more prominent, a medium-sized filamentous tail at the end of vein 2, in addition to the tail at the anal lobe.

— Charles Swinhoe, Lepidoptera Indica. Vol. VIII

== Subspecies ==
- Iraota timoleon arsaces (Fruhstorfer, 1907) (south India - Madhya Pradesh to Kerala) male above of a much brighter, more lustrous metallic blue, female entirely suffused with blue. Beneath the white marking less distinct with blurred contours, particularly also the dually-lobed subbasal spot which is more obliterate and covered with brown. The anal angle of the hindwing shows more metallic blue scales.
- Iraota timoleon timoleon (Stoll, 1790) (Andaman & Nicobar Island, Odisha, Uttarakhand to North-East India, South China)
- Iraota timoleon nicevillei (Butler, 1901) (Sri Lanka)
- Iraota timoleon wickii (Eliot, 1980) (Malaysia)

== Life history ==
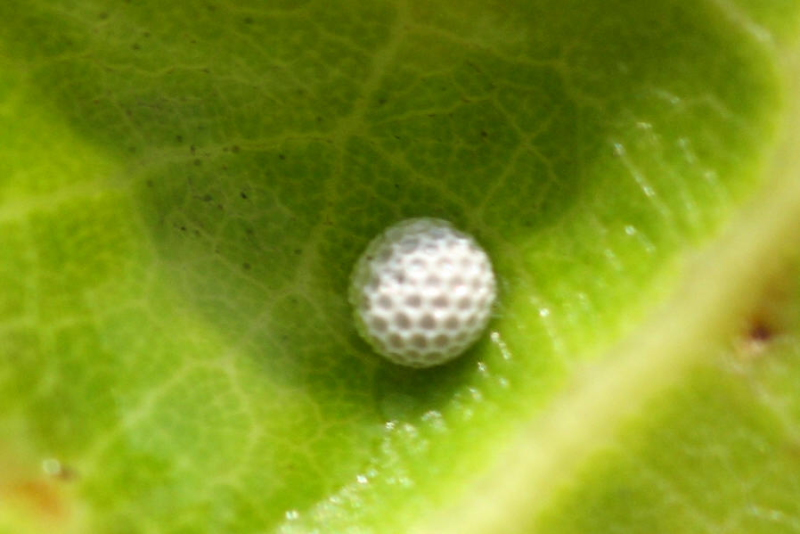
Egg

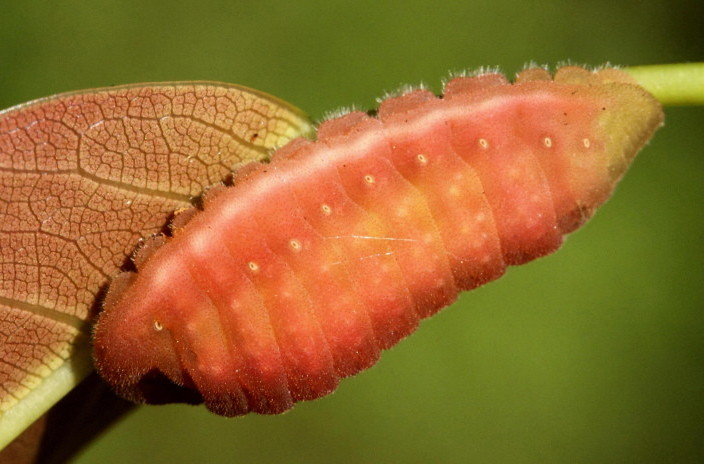
Larva

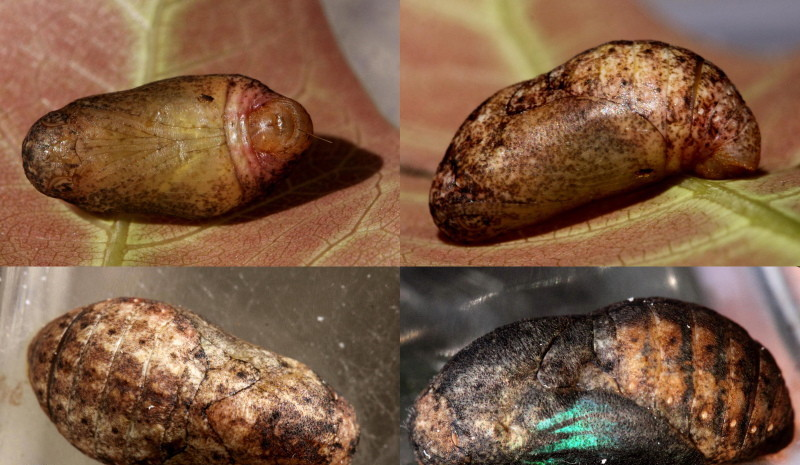
Pupa

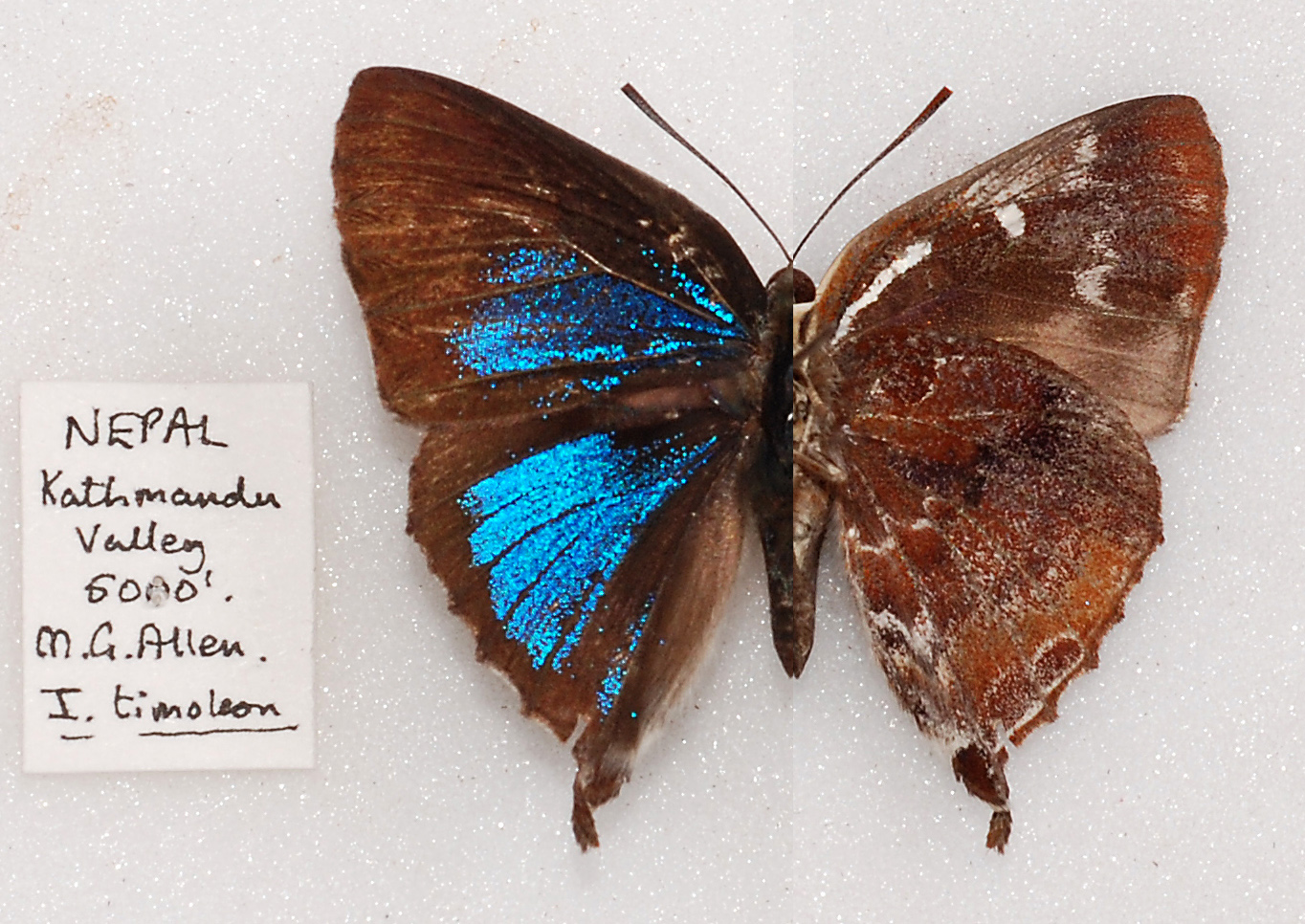
Composite image of a male from Nepal

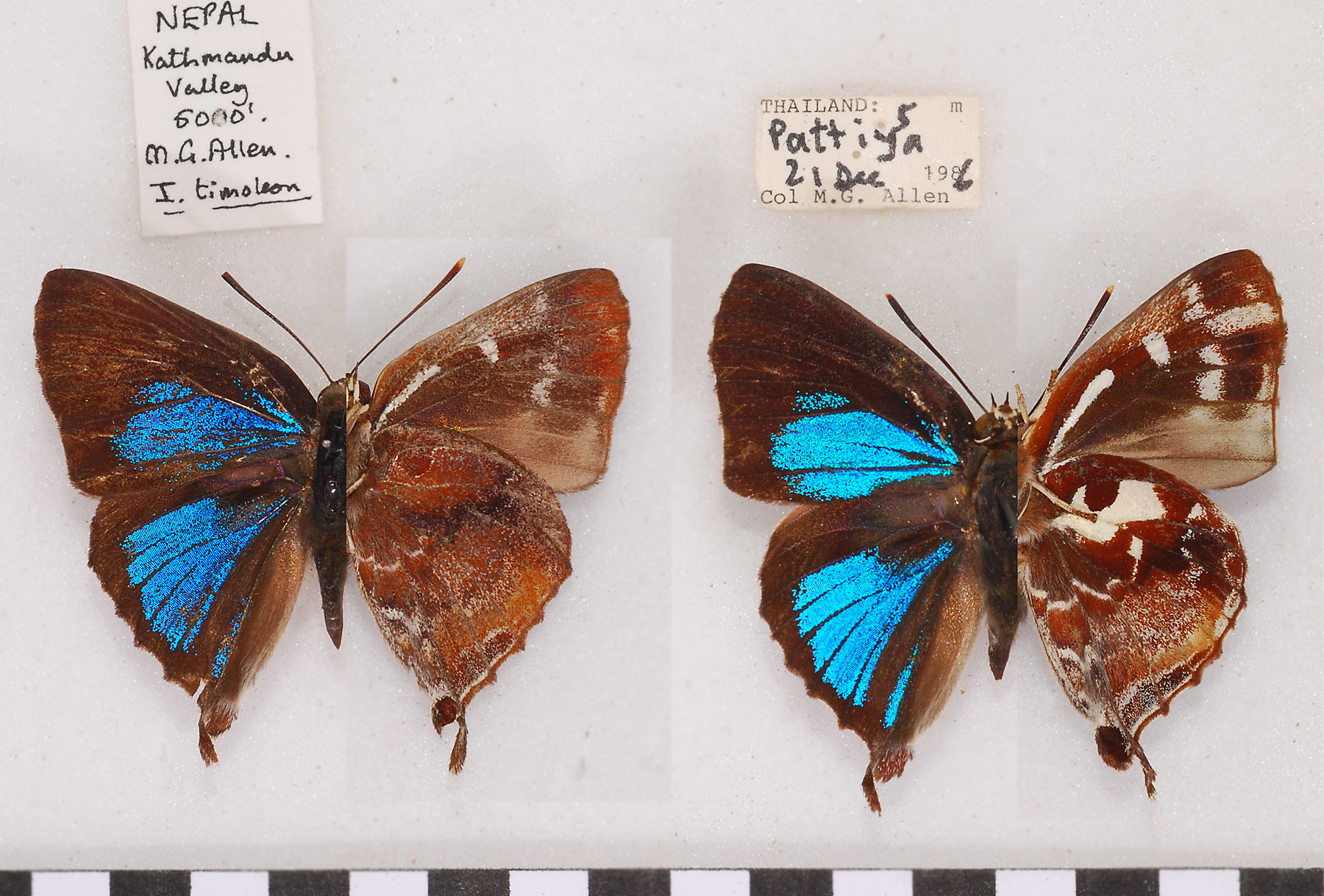

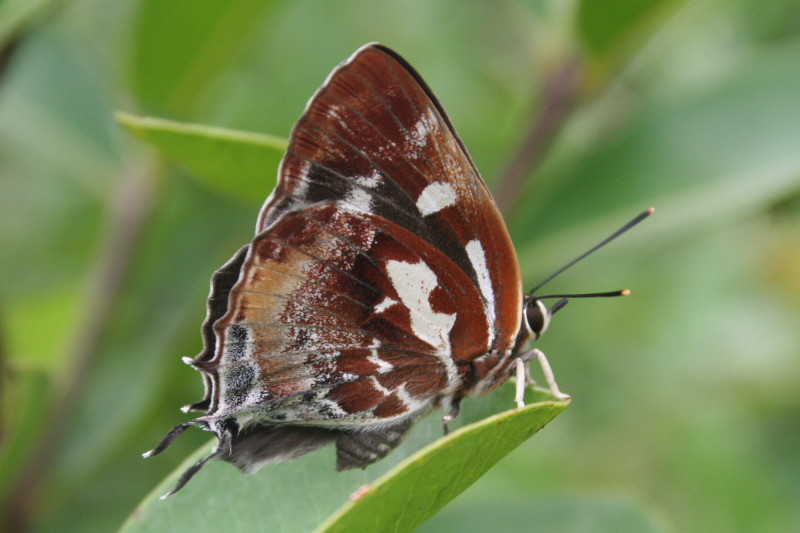
Ventral view
