= Saharan montane xeric woodlands =

Saharan montane or Saharo-montane xeric woodlands can refer to:

- East Saharan montane xeric woodlands
- West Saharan montane xeric woodlands
- Tibesti–Jebel Uweinat montane xeric woodlands
- the above regions in aggregate
