= Platyscapa =

Scientific classification
- Kingdom: Animalia
- Phylum: Arthropoda
- Class: Insecta
- Order: Hymenoptera
- Family: Agaonidae
- Genus: Platyscapa; Motschoulsky, 1863

Type species
- Platyscapa frontalis Motschulsky, 1863

Species
- See text

Genus of wasps

Platyscapa is a genus of 19 species of pollinating fig wasps found in Africa and Madagascar, Middle East, southern Asia and the Indo-Pacific islands. They are pollinators of Ficus species belonging to subsections Conosycea and Urostigma.

== Species ==
- Platyscapa awekei Wiebes, 1977
- Platyscapa arnottiana Abdurahiman, 1980
- Platyscapa bergi Wiebes, 1986
- Platyscapa clavigera (Mayr 1885)
- Platyscapa corneri Wiebes, 1980
- Platyscapa coronata (Grandi, 1928)
- Platyscapa binghami Wiebes, 1980
- Platyscapa desertorum Compton, 1990
- Platyscapa etiennei Wiebes, 1977
- Platyscapa fischeri Wiebes, 1977
- Platyscapa frontalis Motschulsky, 1863
- Platyscapa hsui Chen & Chou, 1997
- Platyscapa indica Priyadarsanan & Abdurahiman, 1997
- Platyscapa innumerabilis (Fullaway, 1913)
- Platyscapa ishiiana (Grandi, 1923)
- Platyscapa paschimaghatensis Priyadarsanan & Abdurahiman, 1997
- Platyscapa quadraticeps (Mayr, 1885)
- Platyscapa sahiana Priyadarsanan & Abdurahiman, 1997
- Platyscapa tjahela (Abdurahiman & Joseph, 1975)
- Platyscapa soraria Wiebes, 1980
