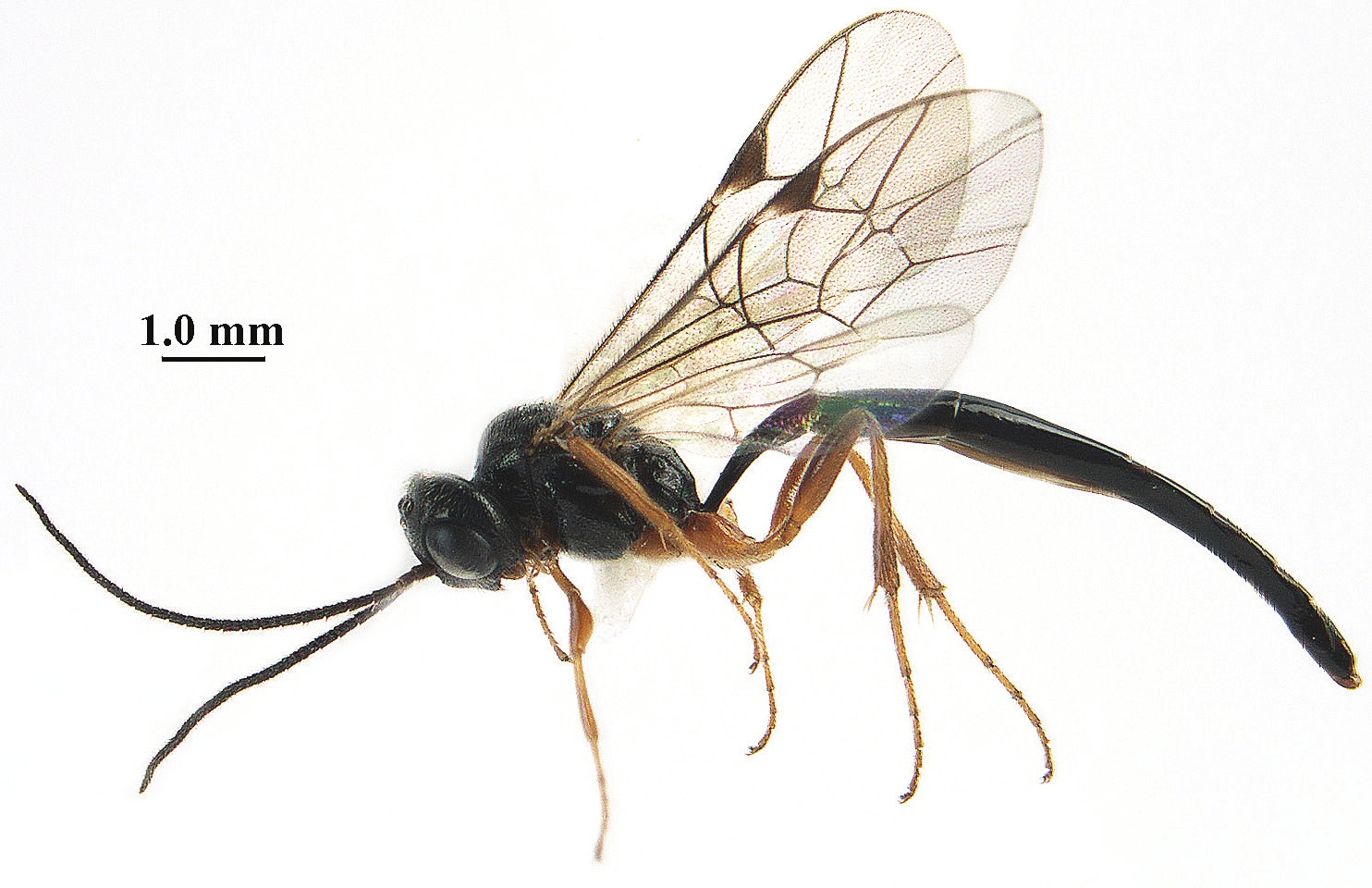
- Seleucus cuneiformis (Ichneumonidae)
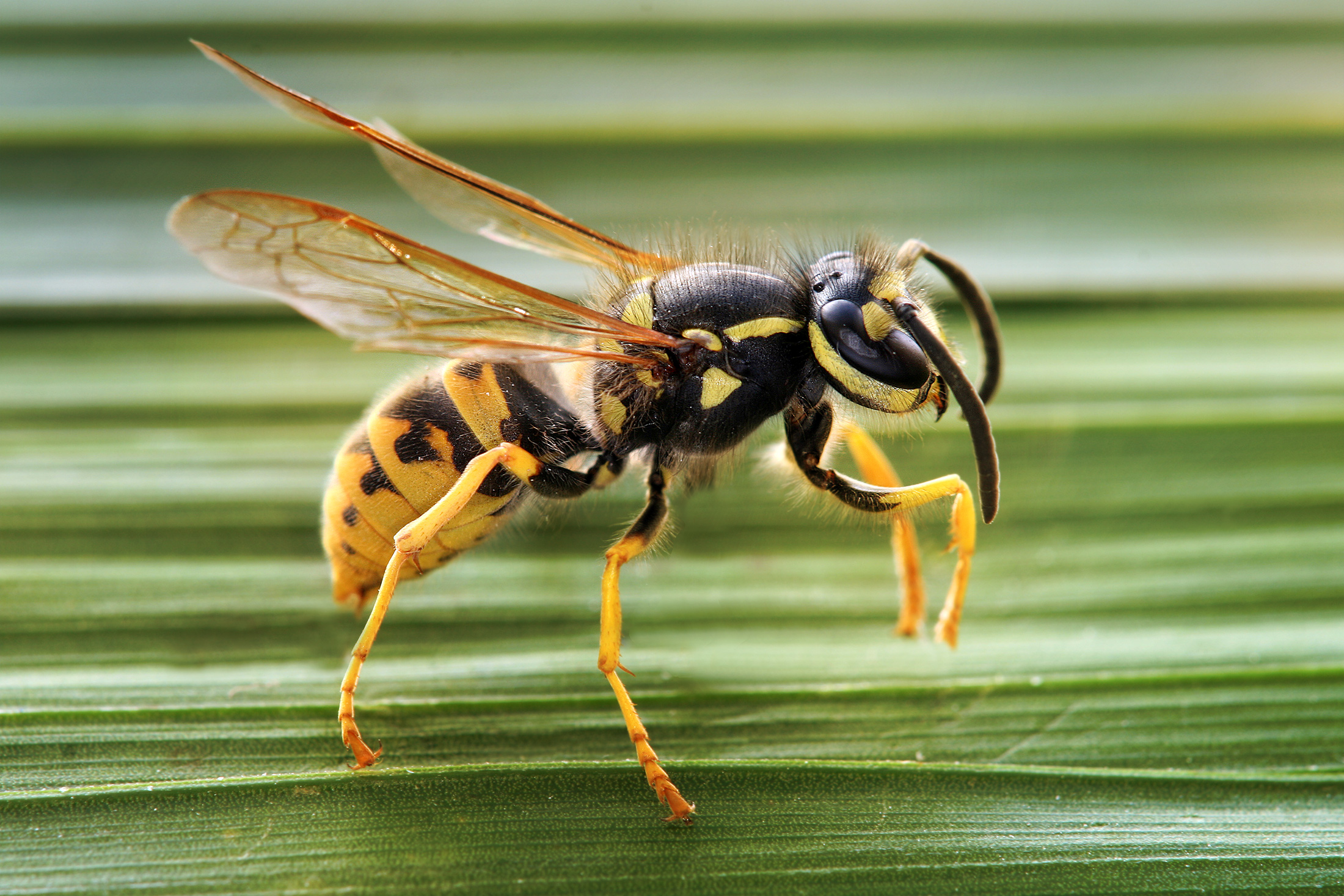
- Vespula germanica (Vespidae)

Scientific classification
- Kingdom: Animalia
- Phylum: Arthropoda
- Clade: Pancrustacea
- Class: Insecta
- Order: Hymenoptera
- Clade: Unicalcarida
- Suborder: Apocrita; Gerstaecker, 1867

Subgroups
- Stephanoidea; Ceraphronoidea; Evanioidea; Ichneumonoidea; Proctotrupomorpha; Cynipoidea; Chalcidoidea; Diaprioidea; Proctotrupoidea; Platygastroidea; Mymarommatoidea; Trigonaloidea; Megalyroidea; Aculeata

= Apocrita =

Apocrita Temporal range: Early Jurassic–Recent

Suborder of insects containing wasps, bees, and ants

Apocrita is a suborder of insects in the order Hymenoptera. It includes wasps, bees, and ants, and consists of many families. It is distinguished from Symphyta by the narrow "waist" (petiole) formed between the first two segments of the actual abdomen; the first abdominal segment is fused to the thorax, and is called the propodeum. Therefore, it is general practice, when discussing the body of an apocritan in a technical sense, to refer to the mesosoma and metasoma (or gaster) rather than the "thorax" and "abdomen", respectively. The evolution of a constricted waist was an important adaption for the parasitoid lifestyle of the ancestral apocritan, allowing more maneuverability of the female's ovipositor. The ovipositor either extends freely or is retracted, and may be developed into a stinger for both defense and paralyzing prey. Larvae are legless and blind, and either feed inside a host (plant or animal) or in a nest cell provisioned by their mothers.

Apocrita has historically been split into two groups, Parasitica and Aculeata. Aculeata is a clade whose name is in standard use. "Parasitica" is not a clade, as it is paraphyletic: the clade would contain the Aculeata. "Parasitica" is therefore a rankless grouping in many present classifications, if it appears at all.

Parasitica comprises the majority of hymenopteran insects, its members living as parasitoids. Most species are small, with the ovipositor adapted for piercing. In some hosts, the parasitoids induce metamorphosis prematurely, and in others it is prolonged. There are even species that are hyperparasites, or parasitoids on other parasitoids. The Parasitica lay their eggs inside or on another insect (egg, larva or pupa) and their larvae grow and develop within or on that host. The host is nearly always killed. Many parasitic hymenopterans are used as biological control agents to control pests, such as caterpillars, true bugs and hoppers, flies, and weevils.

Aculeata is a monophyletic group that includes those species in which the female's ovipositor is modified into a stinger to inject venom. Groups within Aculeata include the familiar ants, bees, and various types of parasitic and predatory wasps; it also includes all of the social hymenopterans. Among the nonparasitic and nonsocial Aculeata, larvae are fed with captured prey (typically alive and paralyzed) or may be fed pollen and nectar. The social Aculeata feed their young prey (paper wasps and hornets), pollen and nectar (bees), or seeds, fungi, or nonviable eggs (ants).

== Extant families and superfamilies ==
The Apocrita contains a large number of families. Some traditional taxa such as the Parasitica (containing many families of parasitoid wasps) have been found on molecular analysis to be paraphyletic. Parasitoidism evolved once, and it is found today across most Apocritan families, though it has been secondarily lost several times. The phylogenetic tree gives a condensed overview of the phylogeny, illustrated with major groups. The sawflies are paraphyletic as the Apocrita evolved inside that group. The tree is not fully resolved.

Cladogram of Apocrita after Peters et al.(2017)

- Apocrita
  - Parasitoida
    - - Ceraphronoidea
      - Ichneumonoidea
    - Proctotrupomorpha
      - Cynipoidea
      - - Platygastroidea
        - - Chalcidoidea
          - - Diaprioidea
            - Proctotrupoidea
  - - - Evanioidea
      - Stephanoidea
    - - Trigonaloidea
      - Aculeata
        - Chrysidoidea
        - - Vespoidea (potter, honey and social wasps)
          - - - Pompiloidea (velvet ants, spider wasps and relatives)
              - - Thynnoidea
                - Tiphioidea
            - - Scolioidea
              - - Formicoidea (ants)
                - Apoidea
                  - Ampulicidae
                  - - Sphecidae
                    - "Crabronidae" (digger wasps)
                    - Anthophila (bees)

- Suborder Apocrita
  - Infraorder Aculeata
    - Superfamily Apoidea (bees and sphecoid wasps)
      - Family Ammoplanidae
      - Family Ampulicidae (cockroach wasps)
      - Family Astatidae
      - Family Bembicidae (sand wasps)
      - Family Crabronidae
      - Family Mellinidae
      - Family Pemphredonidae
      - Family Philanthidae (bee wolves)
      - Family Psenidae
      - Family Sphecidae (digger wasps)
      - Family †Angarosphecidae
      - Family †Paleomelittidae
      - Family †Temnogynidae
      - Clade Anthophila
        - Family Andrenidae (mining bees)
        - Family Apidae (carpenter bees, digger bees, cuckoo bees, bumble bees, orchid bees, stingless bees, and honeybees)
        - Family Colletidae (yellow-faced bees and plasterer bees)
        - Family Halictidae ("sweat bees")
        - Family Megachilidae (leaf-cutting bees)
        - Family Melittidae
        - Family Stenotritidae
    - Superfamily Chrysidoidea
      - Family Bethylidae
      - Family Chrysididae (cuckoo wasps)
      - Family Dryinidae
      - Family Embolemidae
      - Family Plumariidae
      - Family Sclerogibbidae
      - Family Scolebythidae
    - Superfamily Formicoidea
      - Family Formicidae (ants)
    - Superfamily Pompiloidea
      - Family Mutillidae (velvet ants)
      - Family Myrmosidae
      - Family Pompilidae (spider wasps)
      - Family Sapygidae
    - Superfamily Scolioidea
      - Family Scoliidae
    - Superfamily Tiphioidea
      - Family Bradynobaenidae
      - Family Sierolomorphidae
      - Family Tiphiidae
    - Superfamily Thynoidea
      - Family Chyphotidae
      - Family Thynnidae
    - Superfamily Vespoidea
      - Family Rhopalosomatidae
      - Family Vespidae (paper wasps, potter wasps, hornets, pollen wasps, yellowjackets)
  - Proctotrupomorpha
    - Superfamily Chalcidoidea
      - Family Agaonidae (fig wasps)
      - Family Aphelinidae
      - Family Azotidae
      - Family Baeomorphidae
      - Family Boucekiidae
      - Family Calesidae
      - Family Ceidae
      - Family Cerocephalidae
      - Family Chalcedectidae
      - Family Chalcididae (chalcid wasps)
      - Family Chrysolampidae
      - Family Cleonymidae
      - Family Coelocybidae
      - Family Cynipencyrtidae
      - Family Diparidae
      - Family Encyrtidae
      - Family Epichrysomallidae
      - Family Eucharitidae
      - Family Eulophidae
      - Family Eunotidae
      - Family Eupelmidae
      - Family Eurytomidae (seed chalcids)
      - Family Eutrichosomatidae
      - Family Herbertiidae
      - Family Hetreulophidae
      - Family Heydeniidae
      - Family Idioporidae
      - Family Leucospidae
      - Family Lyciscidae
      - Family Macromesidae
      - Family Megastigmidae
      - Family Melanosomellidae
      - Family Metapelmatidae
      - Family Moranilidae
      - Family Mymaridae (fairyflies) – the smallest of all insects
      - Family Neanastatidae
      - Family Neodiparidae
      - Family Ooderidae
      - Family Ormyridae
      - Family Pelecinellidae
      - Family Perilampidae
      - Family Pirenidae
      - Family Pteromalidae
      - Family Signiphoridae
      - Family Spalangiidae
      - Family Systasidae
      - Family Tanaostigmatidae
      - Family Tetracampidae
      - Family Torymidae
      - Family Trichogrammatidae
    - Superfamily Cynipoidea
      - Family Austrocynipidae
      - Family Cynipidae (gall wasps)
      - Family Diplolepididae
      - Family Figitidae
      - Family Ibaliidae
      - Family Liopteridae
      - Family Paraulacidae
    - Superfamily Diaprioidea
      - Family Austroniidae
      - Family Diapriidae
      - Family Maamingidae
      - Family Monomachidae
    - Superfamily Mymarommatoidea
      - Family Mymarommatidae
    - Superfamily Platygastroidea
      - Family Geoscelionidae
      - Family Janzenellidae
      - Family Neuroscelionidae
      - Family Nixoniidae
      - Family Platygastridae
      - Family Scelionidae
      - Family Sparasionidae
    - Superfamily Proctotrupoidea
      - Family Heloridae
      - Family Pelecinidae
      - Family Peradeniidae
      - Family Proctorenyxidae
      - Family Proctotrupidae
      - Family Roproniidae
      - Family Vanhorniidae
  - Superfamily Stephanoidea
    - Family Stephanidae
  - Superfamily Trigonaloidea
    - Family †Maimetshidae
    - Family Trigonalidae
  - Superfamily Ceraphronoidea
    - Family Ceraphronidae
    - Family Megaspilidae
  - Superfamily Evanioidea
    - Family Aulacidae
    - Family Evaniidae (ensign wasps)
    - Family Gasteruptiidae
  - Superfamily Ichneumonoidea
    - Family Braconidae
    - Family Ichneumonidae (ichneumon wasps)
  - Superfamily Megalyroidea
    - Family Megalyridae
