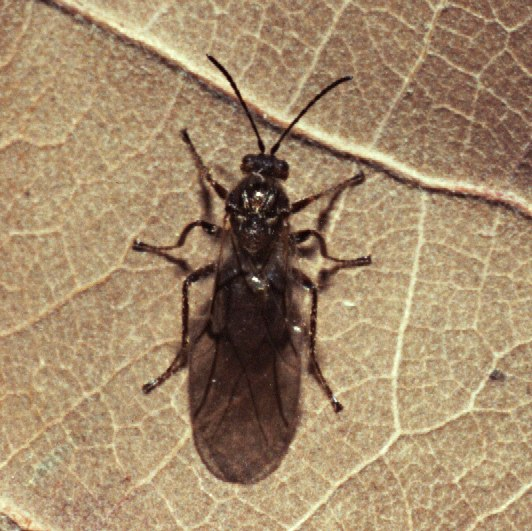
- Cynips quercusfolii (Proctotrupomorpha)

Scientific classification
- Kingdom: Animalia
- Phylum: Arthropoda
- Clade: Pancrustacea
- Class: Insecta
- Order: Hymenoptera
- Suborder: Apocrita
- Infraorder: Parasitica; Informal (Obsolete)

Subgroups
- Ceraphronoidea; Evanioidea; Ichneumonoidea; Megalyroidea; Stephanoidea; Trigonaloidea; Proctotrupomorpha; Chalcidoidea; Cynipoidea; Diaprioidea; Mymarommatoidea; Platygastroidea; Proctotrupoidea; Traditionally/paraphyletically excluded but cladistically included: Aculeata

Synonyms
- Terebrantia (preoccupied Terebrantia, Haliday, 1836, Thysanoptera); Terebrantes

= Parasitica =

Group of wasps

Parasitica (the parasitican wasps) is an obsolete, paraphyletic infraorder of Apocrita containing the parasitoid wasps. It includes all Apocrita except for the Aculeata. Parasitica has more members as a group than both the Symphyta and the Aculeata combined.

Parasitica also contains groups of phytophagous hymenopterans such as the Cynipoidea (gall wasps).
