= Cleonymus =

Cleonymus or Kleonymos may refer to:

- Cleonymus of Athens (fifth century BCE) Athenian general, cited by Aristophanes for his cowardice
- Cleonymus (d. 371 BCE), son of great beauty of Sphodrias and aḯtas ("beloved") of King Archidamus III of Sparta
- Cleonymus of Sparta (c. 340–c. 272 BCE) Spartan general and member of the royal family of the Agiads
- Cleonymus of Phlius (fl. 229 BCE) tyrant of the city of Phlius who was convinced to resign his post by Aratus of Sicyon in 329 BC
- Cleonymus (wasp), an insect genus in the family Pteromalidae
