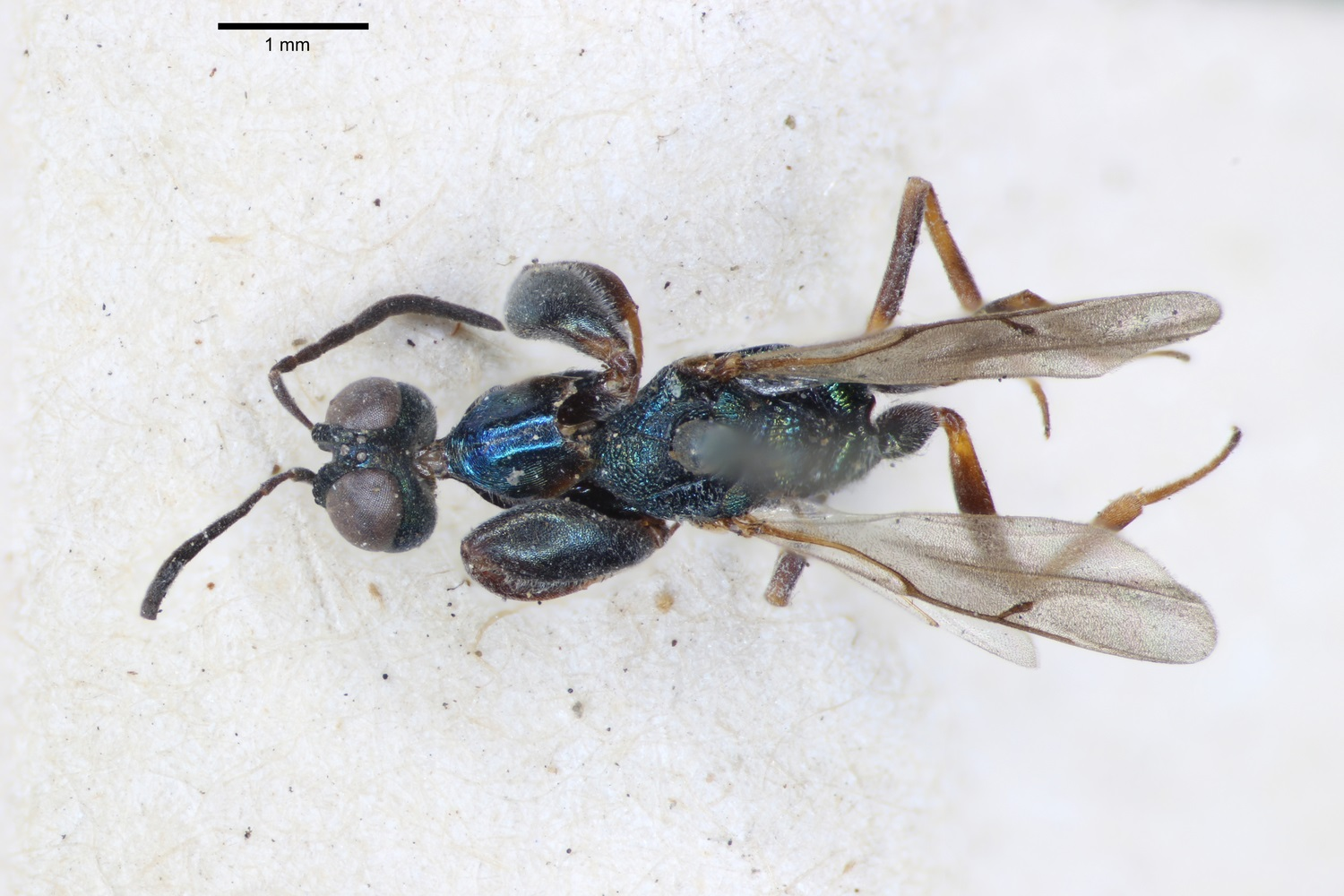
- Oodera tenuicollis

Scientific classification
- Kingdom: Animalia
- Phylum: Arthropoda
- Clade: Pancrustacea
- Class: Insecta
- Order: Hymenoptera
- Suborder: Apocrita
- Infraorder: Proctotrupomorpha
- Superfamily: Chalcidoidea
- Family: Ooderidae
- Genus: Oodera; Westwood, 1874

= Oodera =

Genus of wasp

Oodera is the sole genus in the monotypic family Ooderidae. Almost all species are parasatoids of xylophagous beetles in the families Buprestidae and Curculionidae, however much of their biology is unknown. They are rarely collected especially by common methods used by Chalcidoidea specialists such as malaise traps, sweep nets, and pan traps. Species occur in the warm areas of the Palaeartic, Afrotropical, and Indomalayan regions. Only one species Oodera formosa has been introduced into the new world. Species are one of the most easily distinguished chacloids due to their distinctive morphology.

== Morphology ==
The fore femora of Oodera species is greatly enlarged and covered in spines and spinelike setae. The front legs resembling raptorial legs in addition to a prolonged pronotum give species a mantis-like habitus, however as with many other characteristics the function of this feature is unknown. The mesonotal structure is unique in that the mesoscutum and mesoscutellar-axillar complex are fused, this along with the axilla being highly developed cause transcutal articulation to be absent. Members in this genus are relatively large ranging in size from 3.6-17mm.

== Taxonomy ==
Oodera was originally coined in 1874 as a genus in Eupelmidae. In 1958 it was transferred to Pteromalidae and placed in the monotypic tribe Ooderini. In 2022 it was elevated to the family rank along with many other genera in the Pteromalidae family.

Currently 25 species are recognized in Oodera. This excludes Oodera obscura and Oodera rufimana, which are considered nomina dubia because they lack a type species and the original descriptions are insufficient making it impossible to review their taxonomic placement.

- Oodera Ahoma (Mani & Kaul, 1973)
- Oodera arabica Gadallah & Soliman, 2019
- Oodera circularicollis Werner & Peters, 2018
- Oodera felix Werner & Peters, 2018
- Oodera fidelis Werner & Peters, 2018
- Oodera florea Werner & Peters, 2018
- Oodera formosa (Giraud, 1863)
- Oodera gracilis Westwood, 1874
- Oodera heikewernerae Werner & Peters, 2018
- Oodera hoggarensis Hedqvist, 1967
- Oodera leibnizi Werner & Peters, 2018
- Oodera longicollis (Cameron, 1903)
- Oodera madegassa Boucek, 1908
- Oodera magnifica (Risbec, 1951)
- Oodera mkomaziensis Werner & Peters, 2018
- Oodera namibiensis Werner & Peters, 2018
- Oodera niehuisorum Werner & Peters, 2018
- Oodera omanensis Soliman & Gadallah, 2019
- Oodera pumilae Yang, 1996
- Oodera punctulata Rahmani & Rakhshani, 2023
- Oodera rapuzzii Soliman & Gadallah, 2019
- Oodera regiae Yang, 1996
- Oodera similis Soliman & Gadallah, 2019
- Oodera srilankiensis Werner & Peters, 2018
- Oodera tenuicollis (Walker, 1872)
