= Herbertia =

Herbertia may refer to:

- Herbertia (plant), a plant genus in the family Iridaceae
- Herbertia (wasp), a wasp genus in the family Herbertiidae
- Herbertia (journal), an international journal published by the International Bulb Society devoted to the botany and horticulture of geophytic plants with a special emphasis on the Amaryllidaceae and other petaloid monocot families rich in bulbous or cormous plants
