= Balcha =

Balcha (Amharic: ባልቻ) is a male name of Ethiopian origin that may refer to:

- Balcha Safo (1863–1936), Ethiopian general in the Italo-Ethiopian Wars
- Kebede Balcha (1951–2018), Ethiopian marathon runner
- Kassa Balcha (born 1955), Ethiopia cross country runner

== See also ==
Balcha (wasp)
