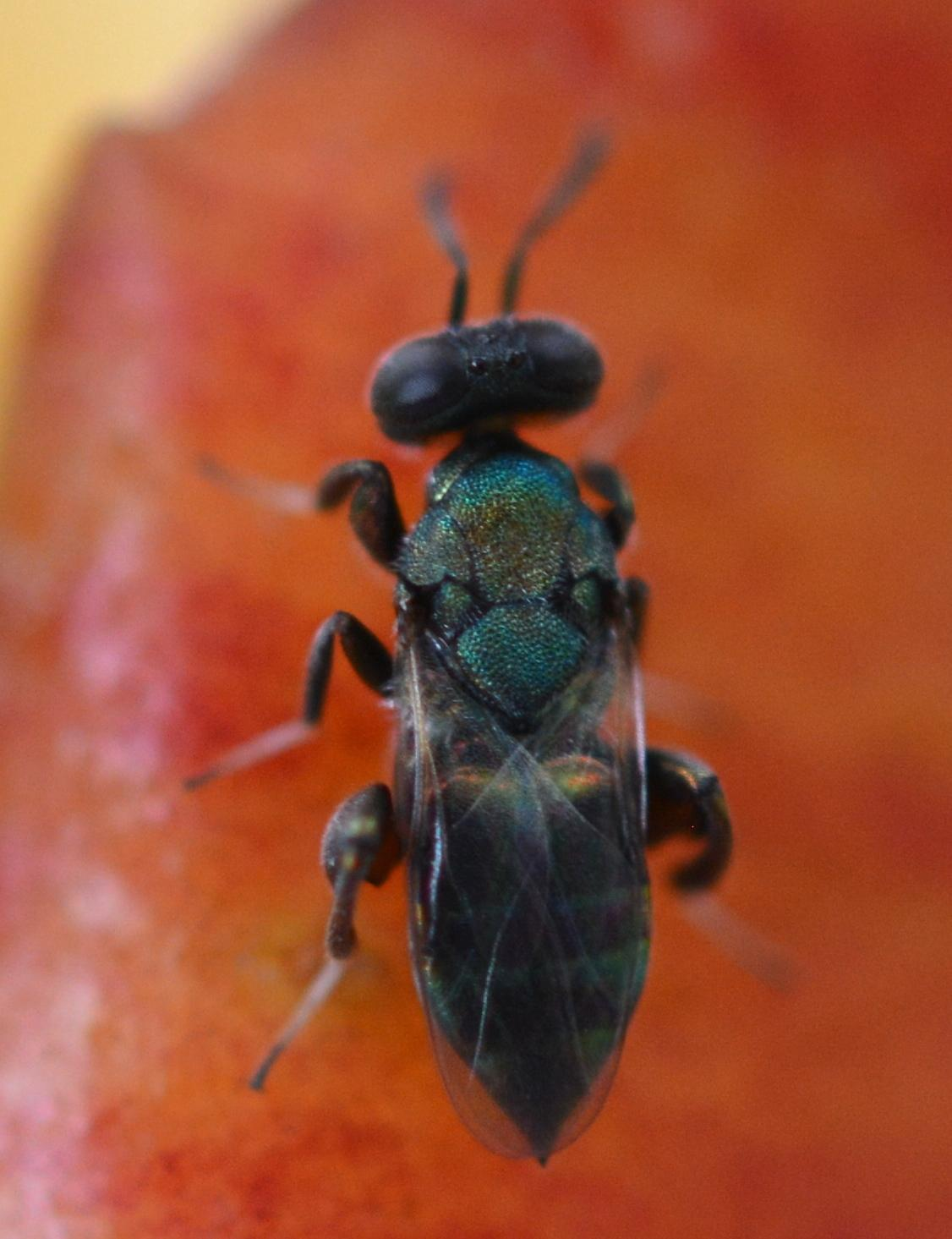
- Chalcedectus sp.

Scientific classification
- Kingdom: Animalia
- Phylum: Arthropoda
- Class: Insecta
- Order: Hymenoptera
- Family: Chalcedectidae; Ashmead, 1904
- Genus: Chalcedectus; Walker, 1852

= Chalcedectus =

Family of wasps

Chalcedectus is a genus of chalcid wasps, previously classified as part of the subfamily Cleonyminae, in the polyphyletic family Pteromalidae. It is the only genus in the monotypic family Chalcedectidae. Most species are parasitoids of wood-boring beetles.

Astrid Cruaud and coworkers found that Chalcedectus falls in what they called the "weird clade", but these wasps look very different from their closest relatives, the Pelecinellidae. This, along with the long time since the divergence, supports the treatment of the genus as a separate family Chalcedectidae. In his 1852 paper on chalcid wasps, where Francis Walker described Chalcedectus maculicornis (the type species) he stated: "This is one of the tropical forms whose characters are more compound or complicated than those of any genera which inhabit more temperate regions; and may be considered either as a connecting link between families, or as a common and governing centre, representing various remote groups, and associating them together. It comes between the Pteromalidae and the Eupelmidae, and is one of the Cleonymidae, and is most allied to Lycisca; but it has the head of Perilampus, the thoracic sculpture of the Perilampidae and the Eurytomidae, and the hind-legs of the Leucospidae and of the Chalcididae."

== Species ==
The following species are recognised in the genus Chalcedectus:

- Chalcedectus annulicornis (Cameron, 1884)
- Chalcedectus annulipes Ashmead, 1904
- Chalcedectus balachowskyi Steffan, 1968
- Chalcedectus busckii (Ashmead, 1900)
- Chalcedectus caelatus (Grissell, 1991)
- Chalcedectus cuprescens (Westwood, 1874)
- Chalcedectus guaraniticus (Strand, 1911)
- Chalcedectus histrionicus (Westwood, 1874)
- Chalcedectus hyalinipennis (Ashmead, 1896)
- Chalcedectus lanei De Santis, 1970
- Chalcedectus maculicornis Walker, 1852
- Chalcedectus maculipennis (Ashmead, 1896)
- Chalcedectus meteorus (Girault, 1927)
- Chalcedectus poeta (Girault, 1927)
- Chalcedectus regalis (Westwood, 1874)
- Chalcedectus sedecimdentatus (Westwood, 1874)
- Chalcedectus septemdentatus (Westwood, 1874)
- Chalcedectus sinaiticus (Masi, 1936)
- Chalcedectus superbus (De Santis, 1977)
- Chalcedectus texanus Brues, 1907

== Gallery ==
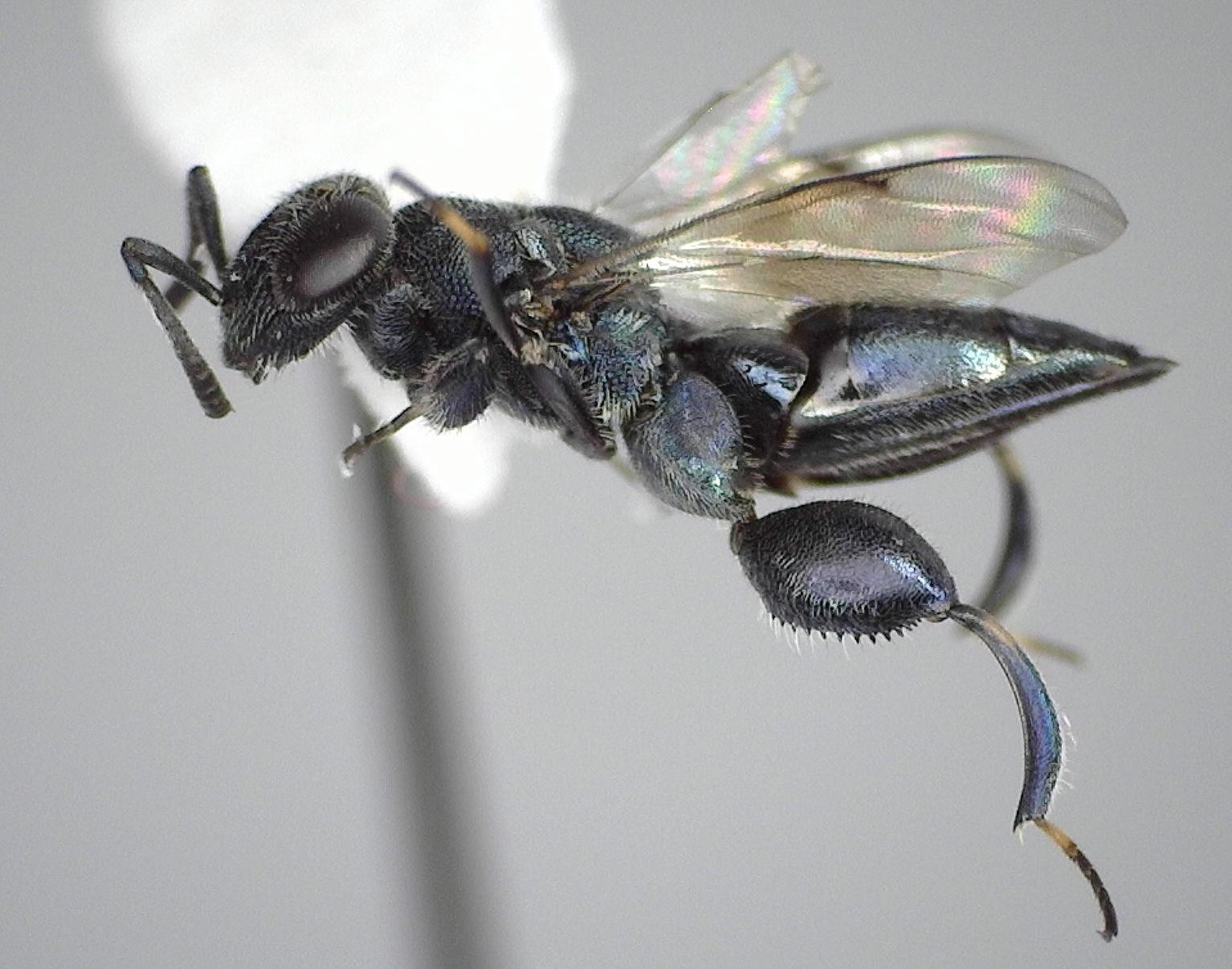
Chalcedectus caelatus

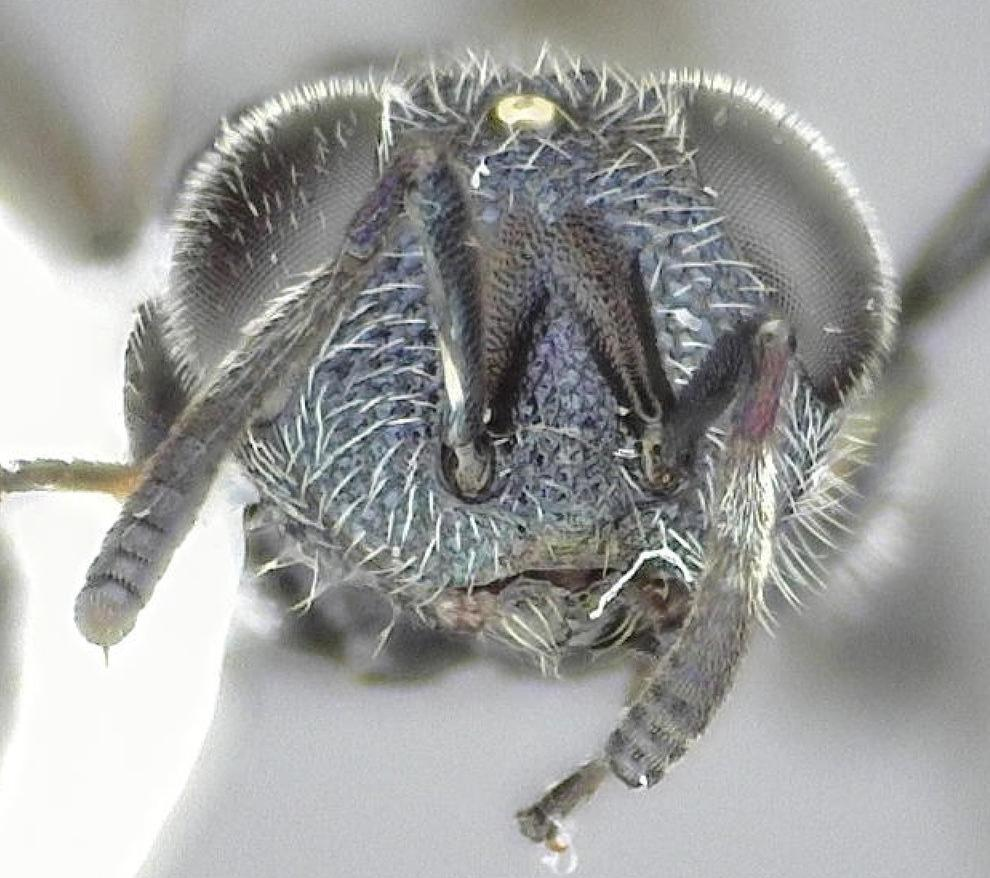
Face of Chalcedectus caelatus

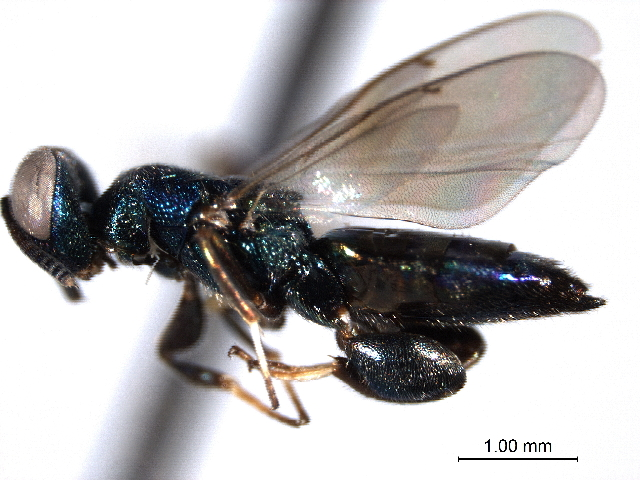
Chalcedectus hyalinipennis

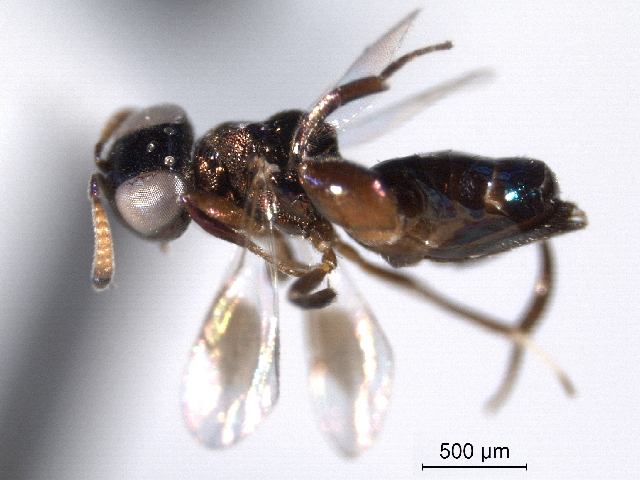
Chalcedectus maculipennis
