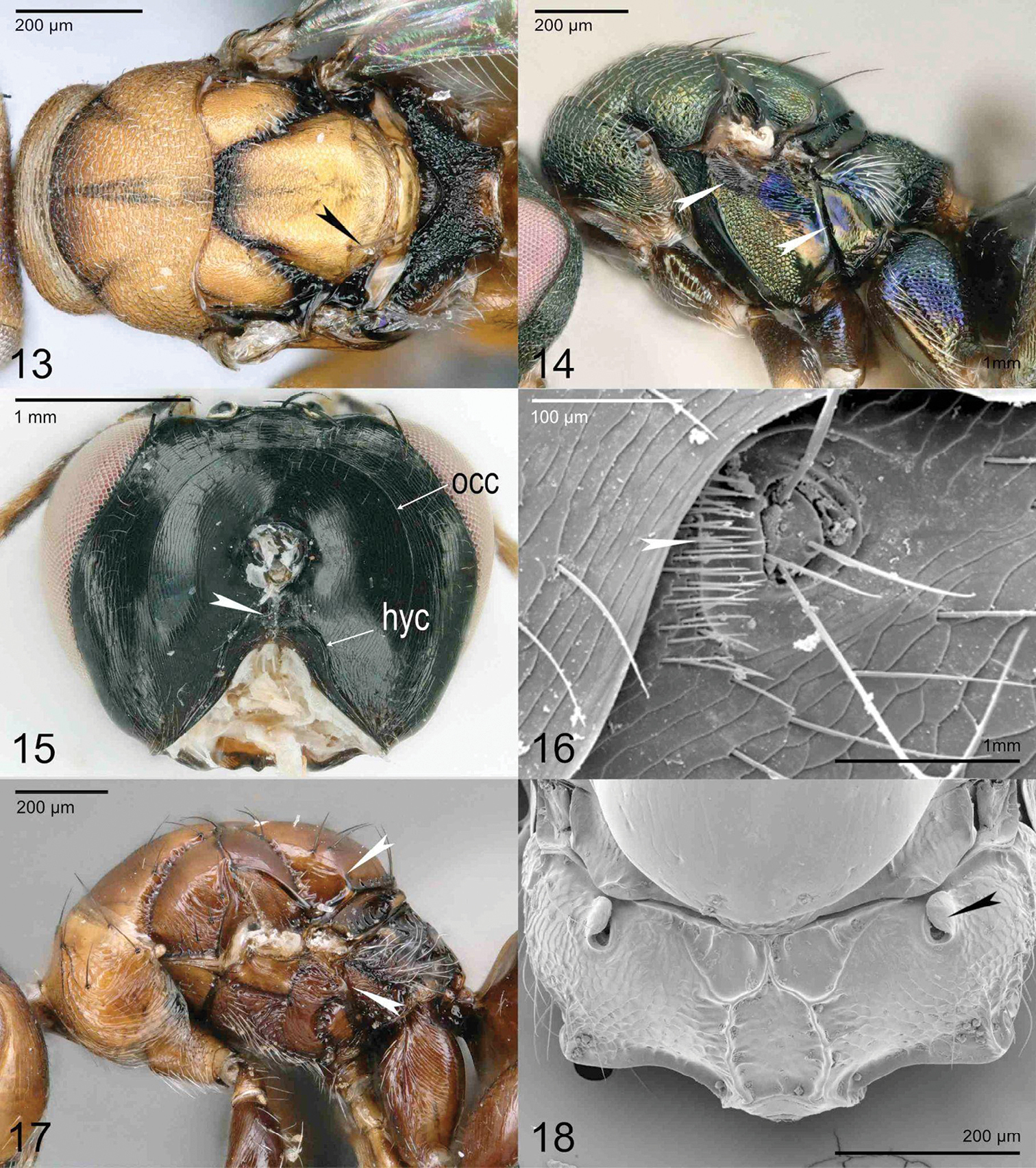
- Top left: Coelocyboides sp. Top right: Ormyromorpha trifasciata Center: Lelaps sp. Bottom left: Eufroggattisca polita Bottom right: Odontofroggattia

Scientific classification
- Kingdom: Animalia
- Phylum: Arthropoda
- Clade: Pancrustacea
- Class: Insecta
- Order: Hymenoptera
- Superfamily: Chalcidoidea
- Family: Coelocybidae; Bouček, 1988

Type genus
- Coelocyba Ashmead, 1900

= Coelocybidae =

Family of parasitic wasp

Coelocybidae is a family of parasitic wasps in the superfamily Chalcidoidea.

== Characteristics ==
Species of this family are very similar to those of the subfamily Cleonyminae. However, distinguishing characteristics of this family include an antenna with eleven flagellomeres, ventrally divergent eyes, mandibles with three teeth, and legs with five tarsomeres. Additionally, the postgena on its subforaminal bridge are separated by its lower tentorial bridge. Its metasoma does not have a syntergum or an epipygium.

== Taxonomy ==
This species contains the following genera:

- Acoelocyba Bouček, 1988
- Ambogaster Heydon, 2014
- Ariasina Heydon, 2014
- Coelocyba Ashmead, 1900
- Coelocyboides Girault, 1914
- Cooloolana Bouček, 1988
- Cybopella Bouček, 1988
- Erotolepsiella Girault, 1915
- Eucoelocybomyia Girault, 1915
- Fusiterga Bouček, 1988
- Lanthanomyia De Santis, 1967
- Lelapsomorpha Girault, 1913
- Liepara Bouček, 1988
- Nerotolepsia Girault, 1920
- Ormyromorpha Girault, 1913
- Paratomicobia Girault, 1915
- Tomicobomorphella Girault, 1915

The genus Liepara was formerly placed in its own tribe, Lieparini, but was moved here in 2022.
