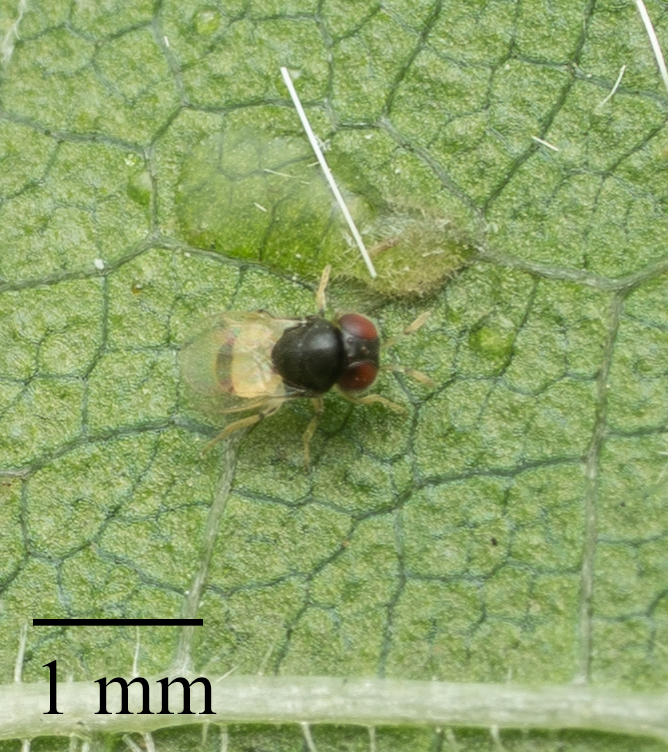
- Idioporus affinis

Scientific classification
- Kingdom: Animalia
- Phylum: Arthropoda
- Class: Insecta
- Order: Hymenoptera
- Suborder: Apocrita
- Infraorder: Proctotrupomorpha
- Superfamily: Chalcidoidea
- Family: Idioporidae; LaSalle, Polaszek, & Noyes, 1997
- Genus: Idioporus; LaSalle & Polaszek, 1997
- Species: I. affinis

Binomial name
- Idioporus affinis LaSalle & Polaszek, 1997

= Idioporus =

Genus of chalcid wasp

Idioporus affinis is a species of chalcid wasp, the only species in the genus Idioporus and the family Idioporidae. Idioporidae, vernacularly known as the idioporid wasps, was formerly a tribe (Idioporini) of the family Pteromalidae, but was elevated to family status in 2022.

== Description ==
The full length of the wasp, from its head to the end of its leg, ranges from approximately 1 to 1.5 millimeters. Its main host is the giant whitefly, Aleurodicus dugesii.

=== Anatomy ===
Its antenna has nine flagellomeres, including four clavomeres, and its mandibles have two teeth. Its basitarsal comb is longitudinal, while its protibial spur is stout and slightly curved. Its clypeus has a transverse subapical groove, and its labrum is hidden behind its clypeus.

== Distribution ==
It is endemic to Central America, specifically Costa Rica, El Salvador, Guatemala, and Mexico. In the 1990s, it was introduced to southern California for biological control of the giant whitefly, a pest on the plant Hibiscus rosa-sinensis.
