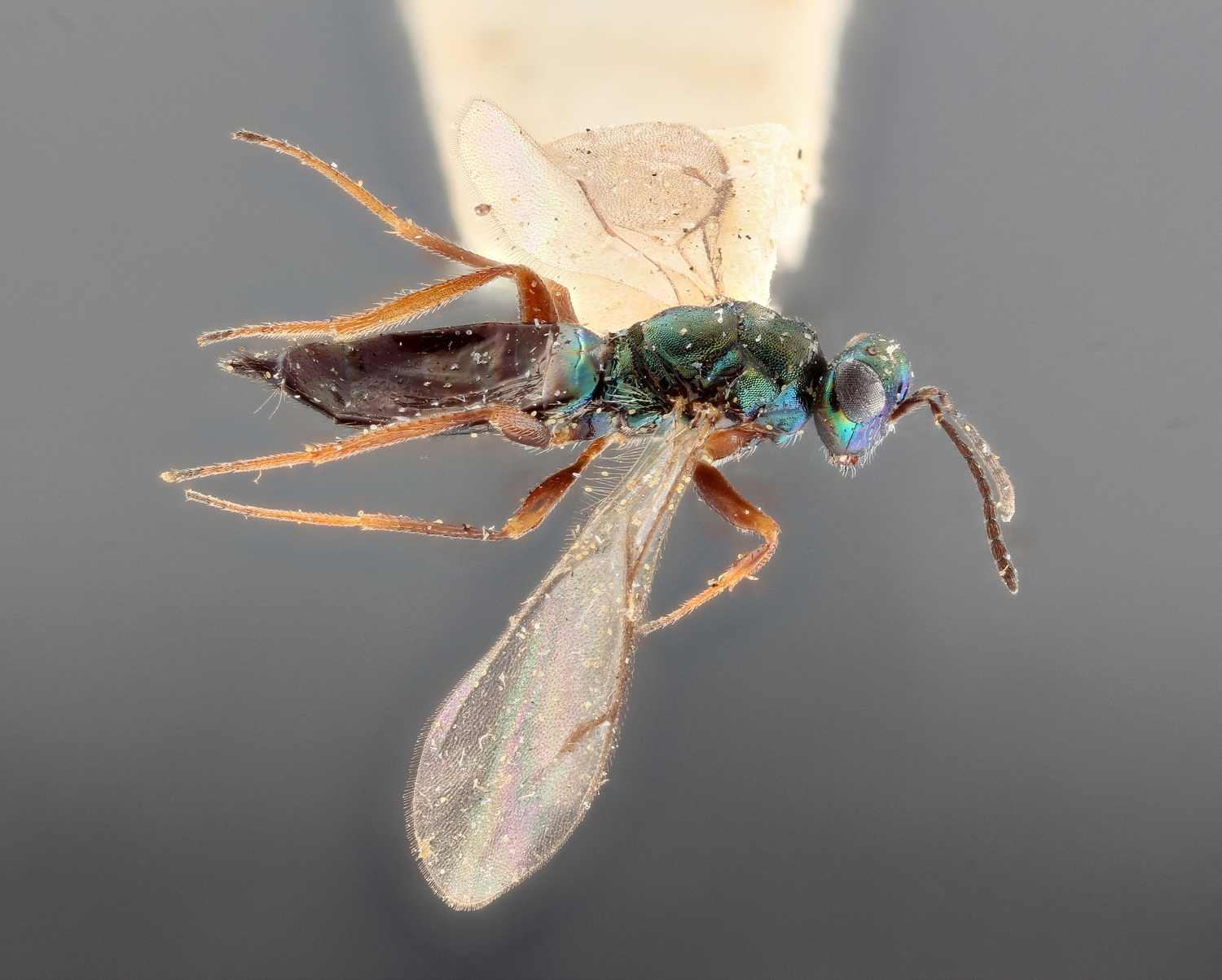
- Macromesus amphiretus

Scientific classification
- Kingdom: Animalia
- Phylum: Arthropoda
- Class: Insecta
- Order: Hymenoptera
- Suborder: Apocrita
- Infraorder: Proctotrupomorpha
- Superfamily: Chalcidoidea
- Family: Macromesidae; Graham, 1959
- Genus: Macromesus; Walker, 1848

Type species
- Macromesus amphiretus Walker, 1848

= Macromesus =

Genus of parasitic wasps

Macromesus is a genus of parasitic wasps. It is the only genus belonging to the family Macromesidae.

== Species ==
This genus contains the following species:

- Macromesus africanus Ghesquière, 1963
- Macromesus americanus Hedqvist, 1960
- Macromesus amphiretus Walker, 1848
- Macromesus brevicornis Yang, 1996
- Macromesus cryphali Yang, 1996
- Macromesus filicornis Delucchi, 1956
- Macromesus fulvicoxa Girault, 1925
- Macromesus harithus Narendran, 2001
- Macromesus huanglongnicus Yang, 1996
- Macromesus javensis Hedqvist, 1968
- Macromesus mediterraneus Bachmaier, 1973
- Macromesus persicae Yang, 1996
