= Boucekiidae =

Scientific classification
- Kingdom: Animalia
- Phylum: Arthropoda
- Clade: Pancrustacea
- Class: Insecta
- Order: Hymenoptera
- Superfamily: Chalcidoidea
- Family: Boucekiidae; Gibson, 2003

Genera
- Boucekius; Chalcidiscelis

Family of wasps

Boucekiidae is a family of chaclid wasps containing 2 genera, the South American genus Boucekius and the Australian genus Chalcidiscelis with each genus only containing one species each. The biology of the family is unknown, however due to their long ovipositors it is theorized they have a concealed host.

It was originally classified as the tribe Boucekiini within the family Cleonyminae before being elevated to the family status. The genus, tribe, and later family were named in honor of Zdeněk Bouček in recognition for his work in chalcid systematics.
