= Brasema =

Scientific classification
- Domain: Eukaryota
- Kingdom: Animalia
- Phylum: Arthropoda
- Class: Insecta
- Order: Hymenoptera
- Family: Eupelmidae
- Subfamily: Eupelminae
- Genus: Brasema; Cameron, 1884

Type species
- Brasema brevispina Cameron, 1884

Species
- >50; see text

Synonyms
- Anickia Kalina, 1984; Cerambycobius Ashmead, 1896; Ooderelloides Girault, 1913; Tropimius Brèthes, 1927

Genus of wasps

Brasema is a genus in the family Eupelmidae.

== Species ==
- Brasema acaudus
- Brasema allynii
- Brasema antiphonis
- Brasema aprilis
- Brasema aurata
- Brasema baccharidis
- Brasema bardus
- Brasema basicuprea
- Brasema brevicauda
- Brasema brevispina
- Brasema bruchivorus
- Brasema cerambycoboidea
- Brasema chapadae
- Brasema cleri
- Brasema coccidis
- Brasema corumbae
- Brasema cushmani
- Brasema dryophantae
- Brasema flavovariegata
- Brasema fonteia
- Brasema hetricki
- Brasema homeri
- Brasema incredibilis
- Brasema inyoensis
- Brasema juglandis
- Brasema kim
- Brasema lacinia
- Brasema lamachus
- Brasema lambi
- Brasema leucothysana
- Brasema limneriae
- Brasema longicauda
- Brasema macrocarpae
- Brasema maculicornis
- Brasema maculipennis
- Brasema mandrakae
- Brasema mawsoni
- Brasema neococcidis
- Brasema neomexicana
- Brasema nigripurpurea
- Brasema peruviana
- Brasema planivertex
- Brasema proxima
- Brasema rara
- Brasema rhadinosa
- Brasema rosae
- Brasema schizomorpha
- Brasema seyrigi
- Brasema silvai
- Brasema speciosa
- Brasema sphaericephalus
- Brasema stenus
- Brasema sulcata
- Brasema willei
