= Enigmencyrtus =

Scientific classification
- Kingdom: Animalia
- Phylum: Arthropoda
- Clade: Pancrustacea
- Class: Insecta
- Order: Hymenoptera
- Family: Tanaostigmatidae
- Genus: Enigmencyrtus; Trijapitzin, 1977
- Species: E. zambezei

Binomial name
- Enigmencyrtus zambezei (Risbec, 1955)

Genus of parasitic wasp

Engimencyrtus is a genus of parasitic wasp, containing only the species Enigmencyrtus zambezei (formerly known as Acerophagus zambezei).

== Distribution ==
This species is found mainly in Mozambique.
