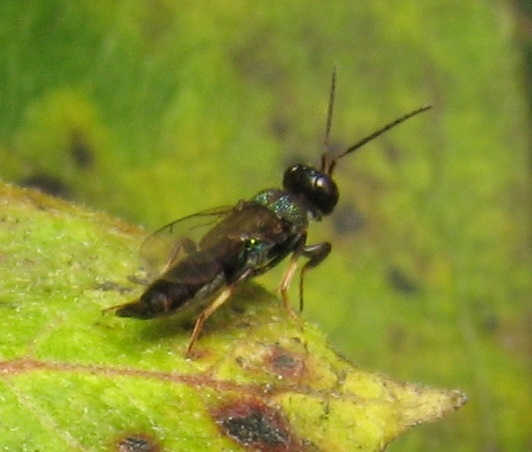
- Balcha indica

Scientific classification
- Kingdom: Animalia
- Phylum: Arthropoda
- Class: Insecta
- Order: Hymenoptera
- Family: Eupelmidae
- Subfamily: Calosotinae
- Genus: Balcha; Walker, 1862

= Balcha (wasp) =

Genus of wasps

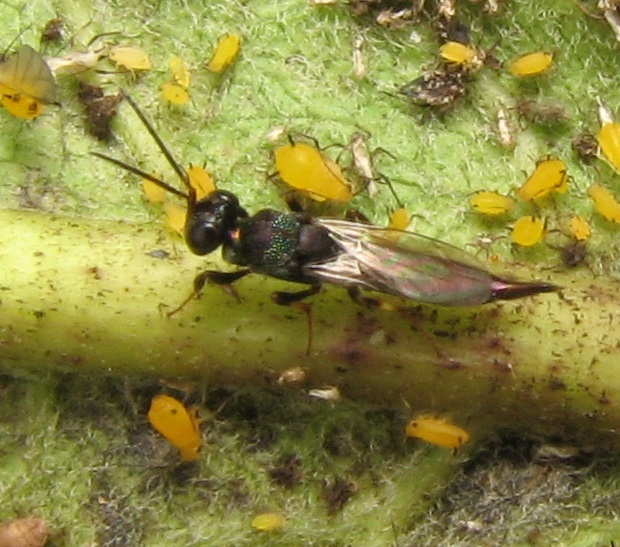
B. indica

Balcha is a genus of chalcid wasps in the family Eupelmidae. There are about 16 described species in Balcha. They are parasitoids of xylophagous (wood-boring) beetles.

Balcha species are found in the Old World (Afrotropical, Australasian, Oriental and Palearctic realms). B. indica has been found in North America, probably as a result of accidental introduction.

== Species ==
These 16 species belong to the genus Balcha:

- Balcha anemeta (Walker, 1846)^{c g}
- Balcha camptogastra Gibson, 2005^{c g}
- Balcha cylindrica Walker, 1862^{c g}
- Balcha dictyota Gibson, 2005^{c g}
- Balcha elegans (Masi, 1927)^{c g}
- Balcha enoptra Gibson, 2005^{c g}
- Balcha eximia (Masi, 1927)^{c g}
- Balcha eximiassita Gibson, 2005^{c g}
- Balcha indica (Mani & Kaul, 1973)^{c g b}
- Balcha laciniosa Gibson, 2005^{c g}
- Balcha levicollis (Cameron, 1908)^{c g}
- Balcha punctiscutum Gibson, 2005^{c g}
- Balcha reburra Gibson, 2005^{c g}
- Balcha reticulata (Nikol'skaya, 1952)^{c g}
- Balcha reticulifrons Gibson, 2005^{c g}
- Balcha splendida (Girault, 1927)^{c g}

Data sources: i = ITIS, c = Catalogue of Life, g = GBIF, b = Bugguide.net
