= Cynipencyrtus =

Scientific classification
- Kingdom: Animalia
- Phylum: Arthropoda
- Clade: Pancrustacea
- Class: Insecta
- Order: Hymenoptera
- Superfamily: Chalcidoidea
- Family: Cynipencyrtidae; Trjapitzin, 1973
- Genus: Cynipencyrtus; Ishii, 1928

Type species
- Cynipencyrtus flavus Ishii, 1928

Species
- Cynipencyrtus flavus Ishii, 1928 Cynipencyrtus indicus Singh, 2008

Genus of wasps

Cynipencyrtus is a genus of parasatoid chalcid wasps. The genus was originally placed in the family Encyrtidae then moved to Tanaostigmatidae before being placed in its own family: Cynipencyrtidae, which it remains the sole genus of.

Members of the genus are primary parasatoids of gall wasps with C. flavus parasitizing Dryocosmus kuriphilus and Andricus species. The exact host of C. Indicus is unknown however, the species was collected from a forest of Quercus leucotrichophora.

Cynipencyrtus flavus can be found in Japan and China while C. indicus is found in India. Their bodies are entirely a non-metallic yellow or orange except for a brown gaster on the female.
