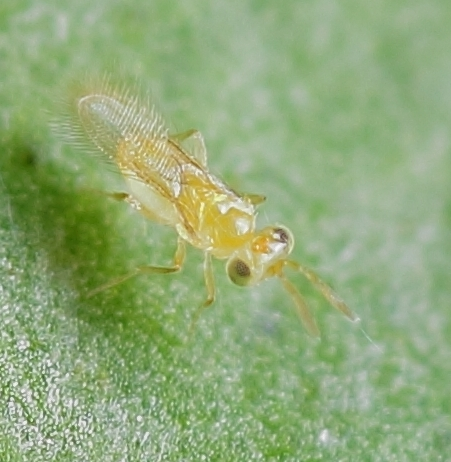
- Cales sp., female

Scientific classification
- Kingdom: Animalia
- Phylum: Arthropoda
- Clade: Pancrustacea
- Class: Insecta
- Order: Hymenoptera
- Family: Calesidae; Howard, 1907
- Genus: Cales; Howard, 1907

= Calesidae =

Family of wasps

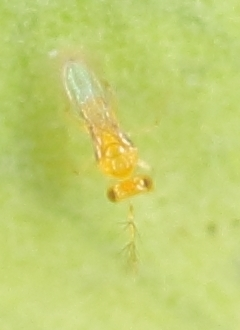
Male Cales sp.

Calesidae is a small family of chalcid wasps, previously classified as subfamily Calesinae, in the family Aphelinidae. These tiny wasps (length less than 1 mm) are parasitoids of other small insects, mainly whitefly species, including the widespread pest Aleurothrixus floccosus.

== Identification ==
Antenna with a radicle two to four times longer than its width and three or four flagellomeres; the club is fused and exceeds the length of the preceding flagellomeres. The protibial spur is short and straight. All legs have four tarsomeres. Scutellum, axilla, and lateral lobe of mesoscutum appear fused. Mesosoma is broadly attached to metasoma. The marginal vein of the hind wing is highly curved. The body is pale yellowish or yellowish brown.

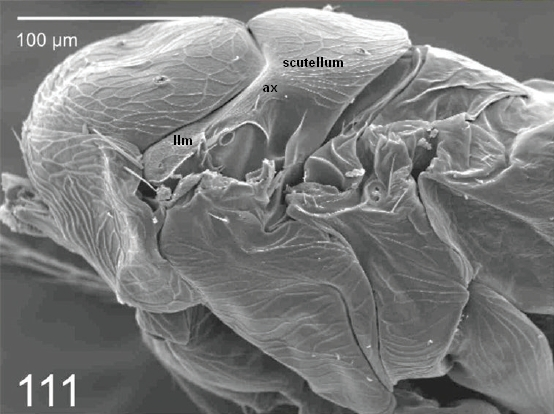
Cales noacki; lateral view of mesosoma, showing the fused appearance of the lateral lobe of the mesoscutum (llm), the axilla (ax), and the scutellum

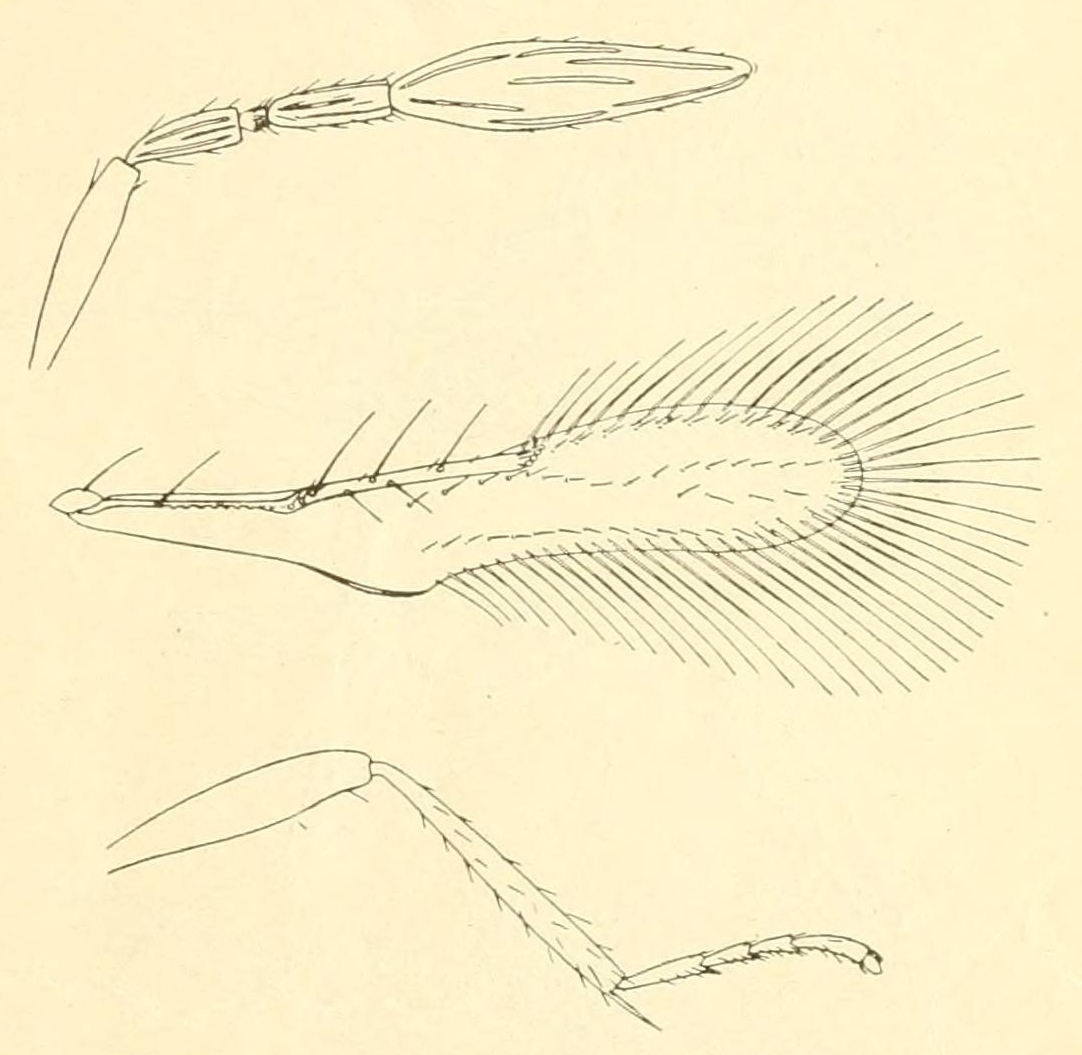
Antenna, fore wing, and middle leg of a female Cales noacki

== Species ==
Cales is the only extant genus in the family. There are two species groups:

- C. noacki group of the Neotropics (and introduced into North America, the Mediterranean, Africa and Atlantic Ocean islands).
  - Cales bicolor
  - Cales breviclava
  - Cales brevisensillum
  - Cales curvigladius
  - Cales longiseta
  - Cales multisensillum
  - Cales noacki
  - Cales noyesi
  - Cales parvigladius
  - Cales rosei
- C. spenceri group of Australia, New Zealand, and Taiwan.
  - Cales berryi
  - Cales motterni
  - Cales orchamoplati
  - Cales spenceri
