= Hetreulophidae =

Scientific classification
- Kingdom: Animalia
- Phylum: Arthropoda
- Clade: Pancrustacea
- Class: Insecta
- Order: Hymenoptera
- Superfamily: Chalcidoidea
- Family: Hetreulophidae

Type genus
- Hetreulophus Girault, 1915

Genus of parasitic wasps

Hetreulophidae is a family of parasitic wasps commonly known as hetreulophid wasps.

== Genera ==
This species contains the following genera:

- Divna Bouček, 1988
- Hetreulophus Girault, 1915
- Omphalodipara Girault, 1923
- Zeala Bouček, 1988
