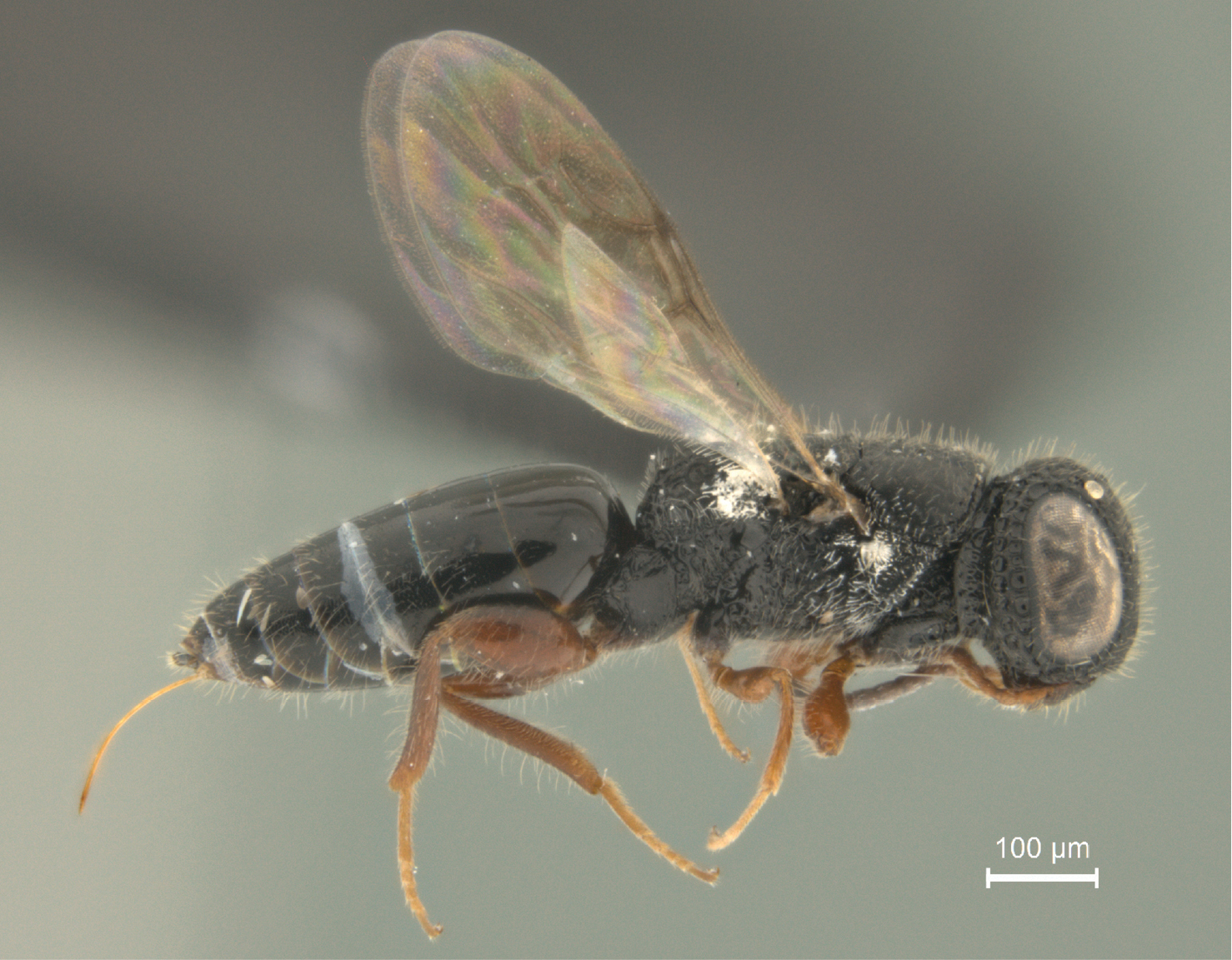
- Cryptalyra helenae

Scientific classification
- Domain: Eukaryota
- Kingdom: Animalia
- Phylum: Arthropoda
- Class: Insecta
- Order: Hymenoptera
- Superfamily: Megalyroidea
- Family: Megalyridae; Schletterer, 1890

Genera
- See text

= Megalyridae =

Megalyridae Temporal range: Albian–Recent

Family of wasps

Megalyroidea is a small hymenopteran superfamily of wasps that includes a single family, Megalyridae, with eight extant genera (plus around a dozen extinct ones) and 49 described species. Modern megalyrids are found primarily in the southern hemisphere, though fossils have only been found in the northern hemisphere. The most abundant and species-rich megalyrid fauna is in Australia. Another peak of diversity appears to be in the relict forests of Madagascar, but most of these species are still undescribed.

Historically, there has been much confusion about the definition of this family. Species now placed in Megalyridae have in the past been classified into as many as six other families (Braconidae, Evaniidae, Ichneumonidae, and Stephanidae, as well as Dinapsidae and Maimetshidae, with Dinapsidae now considered to be within the Megalyridae. Maimetshidae is no longer considered closely related to Megalyridae, and has been included in Trigonaloidea with Trigonalidae. The oldest fossils confidently identifiable as megalyrids date to the Early Cretaceous.

The best defining feature, unique to the family, is the mesothoracic spiracle has moved, and is actually located in the upper corner of the pronotum, though this is a fairly obscure feature to see. Perhaps the most useful visible character is that the base of the antenna fits into a wide, concave groove below the eye, though a few other wasp families exhibit this trait. Females of Megalyra have ovipositors ranging from five to eight times their body length, but this is not true of the other genera.

The largest known megalyrid is the female of the Australian Megalyra shuckardi, with a body length of 22 mm (0.9 in) and ovipositor length of 82 mm (3.2 in). The smallest known megalyrid is the Brazilian Cryptalyra plaumanni, with a body length of 2.9 mm (0.1 in) and ovipositor 1 mm (0.0 in) long.

Megalyrid wasps are thought to be idiobiont endoparasitoids of concealed insect larvae. One Australian species, Megalyra troglodytes, attacks the larvae of Arpactophilus mimi, a mud-nesting crabronid wasp. Oviposition habits of Megalyridae are regarded as quite primitive, with field observations suggesting they simply poke their ovipositors into pre-existing cavities, holes, or cracks, rather than drilling into the substrate as in other Apocrita.

== Genera ==
Taxonomy following Brazidec et al. 2024.

Extant genera

- Carminator (9 species) East Asia, Southeast Asia, New Guinea
- Cryptalyra (6 species) Northern South America
- Dinapsis (19 species) Africa, Madagascar
- Ettchellsia (7 species) Southeast Asia
- Megalyra (27 living + 1 fossil species) Australia, New Guinea, Southeast Asia (extant) Baltic amber, Eocene
- Megalyridea (1 species) South Africa
- Neodinapsis (1 species) Chile
- Rigel (1 species) Chile

Extinct genera

- †Cretodinapsis (1 species) Rasnitsyn, 1977 Azerbaijan amber, Late Cretaceous (Cenomanian)
- †Cretolyra (2 species) Brazidec et al. 2024 Burmese amber, Myanmar, mid Cretaceous (Albian-Cenomanian)
- †Genkyhag (1 species)Brazidec et al. 2024 Burmese amber, Myanmar, mid Cretaceous (Albian-Cenomanian)
- †Kamyristi (2 species) Brazidec et al. 2024 Taimyr amber, Cretaceous (Albian-Cenomanian, Santonian)
- †Megacoxa (3 species) Brazidec et al. 2024 Burmese amber, Myanmar, mid Cretaceous (Albian-Cenomanian)
- †Megalava (1 species) Perrichot 2009 Spanish amber, Early Cretaceous (Albian)
- †Megallica (1 species) Perrichot, 2009 Charentese amber, France, Late Cretaceous (Cenomanian)
- †Megazar (1 species) Perrichot 2009 Charentese amber, Late Cretaceous (Cenomanian)
- †Prodinapsis (7 species) Brues 1923 Oise amber, France, Bitterfeld amber, Germany, Rovno amber, Ukraine, Baltic amber, Eocene
- †Valaa (1 species) Perrichot 2009 Spanish amber, Early Cretaceous (Albian)

== Cited texts ==
- Rasnitsyn, A.P. & Brothers, D.J. 2009. New genera and species of Maimetshidae (Hymenoptera: Stephanoidea s.l.) from the Turonian of Botswana, with comments on the status of the family. African Invertebrates 50 (1): 191–204.AbstractPDF
