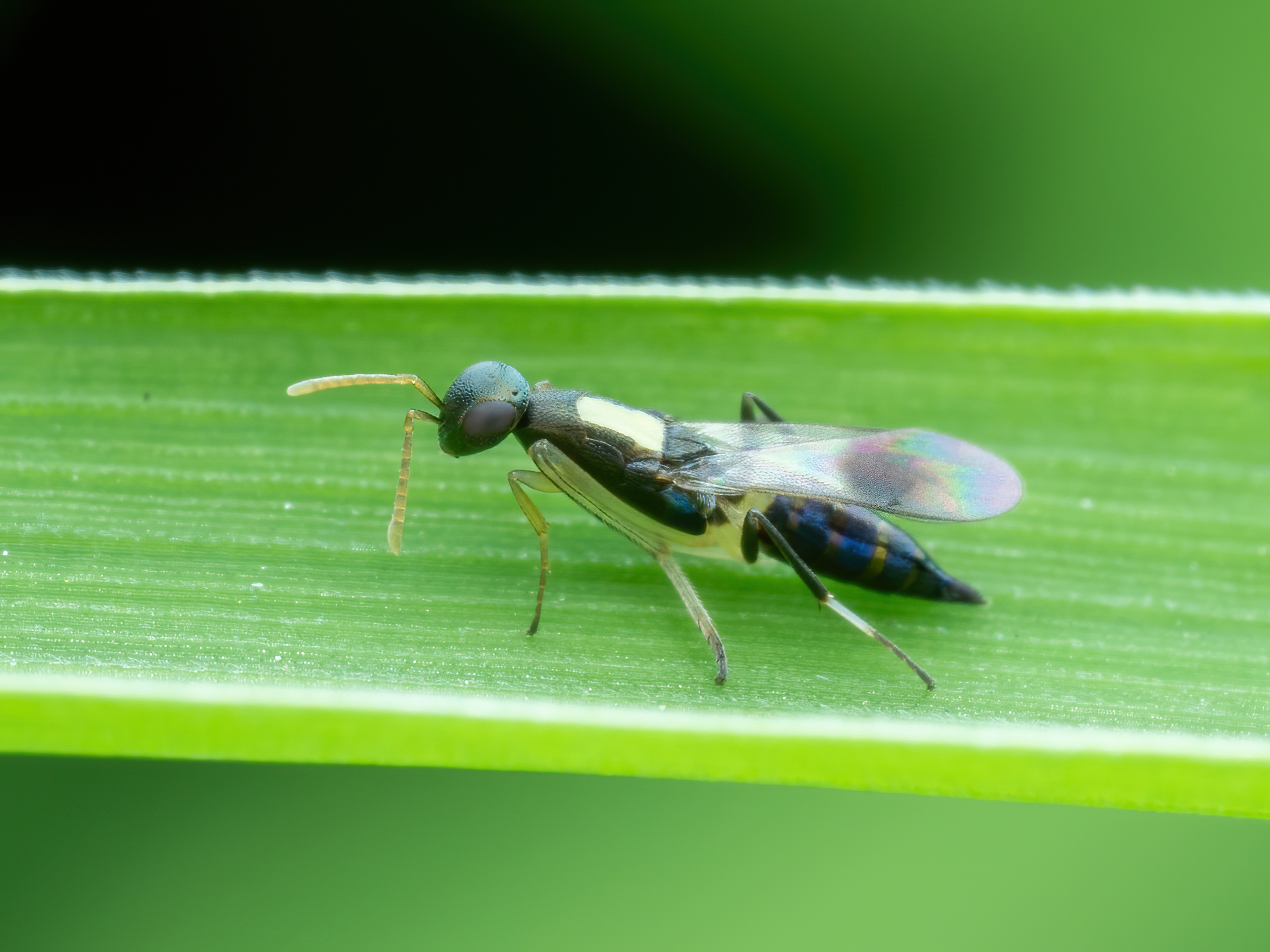
- Neanastatus cinctiventris

Scientific classification
- Kingdom: Animalia
- Phylum: Arthropoda
- Clade: Pancrustacea
- Class: Insecta
- Order: Hymenoptera
- Superfamily: Chalcidoidea
- Family: Neanastatidae; Kalina, 1984

Genera
- Lambdobregma; Neanastatus

= Neanastatidae =

Family of wasps

Neanastatidae is a family of chalcid wasps. The genera comprising this family (Lambdobregma and Neanastatus) were previously placed in the Neanastatinae subfamily of a paraphyletic Eupelmidae. They are parasitoids or hyperparasitoids of fly or beetle larvae.

== Description ==
Antennae with 8 flagellomeres in Neanastatus, and 11 in Lambdobregma. Eyes ventrally divergent. The clypeus does not have a transverse subapical groove, and hides the labrum. The mandibles have three teeth. The scutellum has a hooklike apex that projects downwards and an axillular groove or carina (axillular line). The acropleuron is large, convex, and pad-like; it covers much of the mesopleural area. Legs have five tarsomeres; the protibial spur is stout and curved and a longitudinal basitarsal comb is present; the mesotibial spur is stout and the underside of the mesotarsus has a row of pegs.

== Distribution ==
Lambdobregma is found in the New World (Bahamas, Costa Rica, Jamaica, Panama, and USA [Florida]). Neanastatus is an Old-World genus: It is found in the Afrotropics (Cameroon, Egypt, Ivory Coast, Madagascar, Malawi, Nigeria, Senegal, and South Africa), the Palearctic (Canary Islands, Cyprus, Israel, Italy, Japan, and Spain), Indomalaya (India, Indonesia, Malaysia, Peoples' Republic of China [Guangdong], Philippines, Sri Lanka, Taiwan, and Thailand), and Australasia (Australia).
