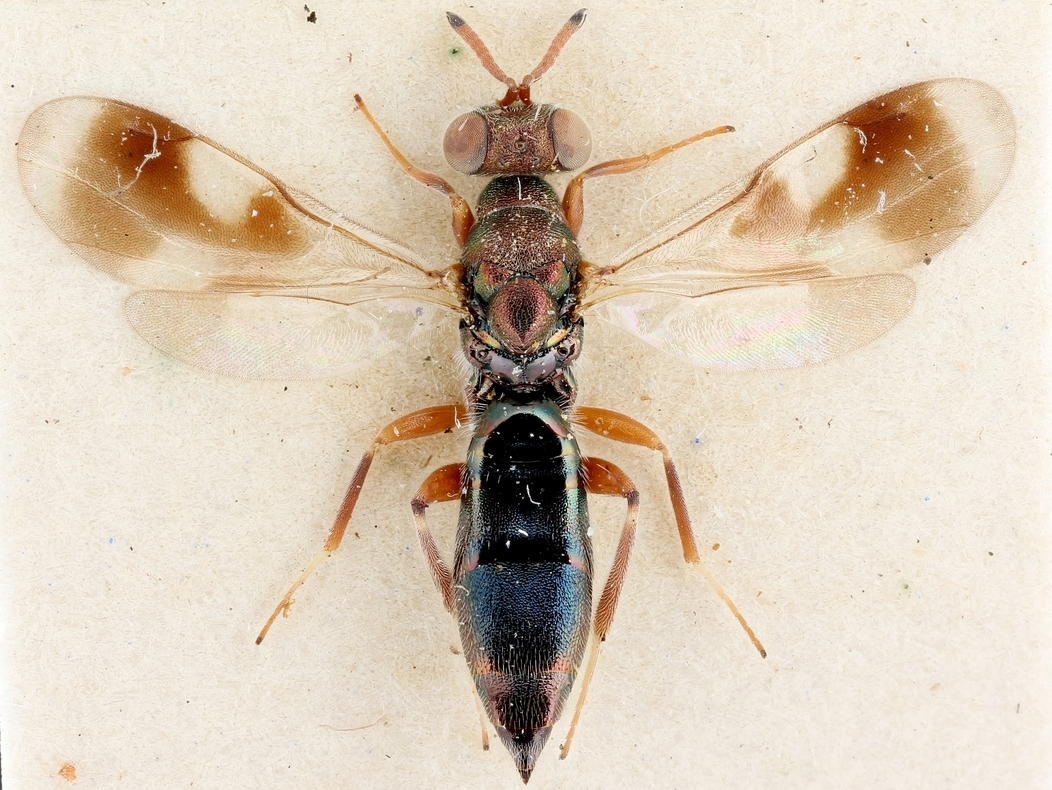

Scientific classification
- Kingdom: Animalia
- Phylum: Arthropoda
- Class: Insecta
- Order: Hymenoptera
- Family: Cleonymidae
- Subfamily: Cleonyminae
- Genus: Cleonymus; Latreille, 1809

Synonyms
- Aplatygerrhus Girault, 1913; Beharella Risbec, 1952; Megormyrus Cockerell, 1926; Ptinobius Ashmead, 1896; Systolomorphella Girault, 1915

= Cleonymus (wasp) =

Genus of wasps

Cleonymus is a genus of wasps in the family Cleonymidae. There are more than 40 described species in the genus, which has been recorded on every continent except Antarctica.

== Species ==
These 47 species belong to the genus Cleonymus:

- Cleonymus agrili (Rohwer, 1919)
- Cleonymus albomaculatus Hedqvist, 1960
- Cleonymus amabilis (Cockerell, 1926)
- Cleonymus angustatus (Masi, 1927)
- Cleonymus apicalis Foerster, 1841
- Cleonymus balcanicus Bouček, 1972
- Cleonymus brevis Bouček, 1972
- Cleonymus calicutensis Sureshan, Ranjith & Rajan, 2019
- Cleonymus californicus (Crawford, 1916)
- Cleonymus canariensis Hedqvist, 1983
- Cleonymus ceratinae Kamijo, 1996
- Cleonymus cingulum Spinola
- Cleonymus collaris Spinola, 1851
- Cleonymus compressipes Spinola
- Cleonymus cyaneus Foerster, 1841
- Cleonymus dentatifemur (Girault, 1926)
- Cleonymus elongatus Foerster, 1841
- Cleonymus eucalifornicus Özdikmen, 2011
- Cleonymus eximius Foerster, 1841
- Cleonymus grandiceps Xiao & Huang, 2001
- Cleonymus indicus Sureshan, 2015
- Cleonymus kamijoi Sureshan & Balan, 2013
- Cleonymus keralicus Narendran & Rajmohana, 2008
- Cleonymus laticincta (Girault, 1926)
- Cleonymus laticornis Walker, 1837
- Cleonymus longinervus Kamijo, 1983
- Cleonymus magnificus (Ashmead, 1888)
- Cleonymus magnus Bouček, 1988
- Cleonymus malaicus Narendran & Mini, 1997
- Cleonymus nigriclavus Girault, 1917
- Cleonymus obscurus Walker, 1837
- Cleonymus pentlandi (Girault, 1922)
- Cleonymus pini Yang, 1996
- Cleonymus regalis (Dodd, 1924)
- Cleonymus reticulatus (Howard, 1897)
- Cleonymus rufiscapus (Girault, 1925)
- Cleonymus ryukyuensis Kamijo, 1996
- Cleonymus serrulatus Kamijo, 1996
- Cleonymus silvifilia (Girault, 1927)
- Cleonymus texanus (Crawford, 1916)
- Cleonymus togashii Kamijo, 1996
- Cleonymus trifasciatipennis (Girault, 1915)
- Cleonymus ulmi Yang, 1996
- Cleonymus unfasciatipennis (Girault, 1915)
- Cleonymus viridicyanea (Risbec, 1952)
- Cleonymus viridinitens Foerster, 1841
