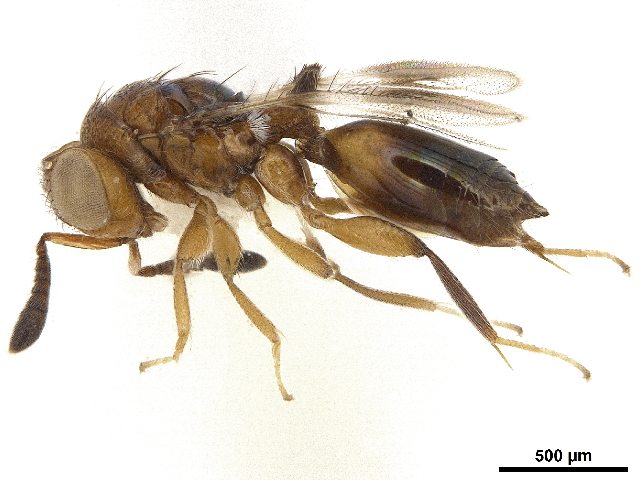
- Ophelosia bifasciata

Scientific classification
- Kingdom: Animalia
- Phylum: Arthropoda
- Clade: Pancrustacea
- Class: Insecta
- Order: Hymenoptera
- Superfamily: Chalcidoidea
- Family: Moranilidae; Bouček, 1988

= Moranilidae =

Family of wasps

Moranilidae is a family of chalcid wasps containing 2 subfamilies consisting of 15 total genera. Moranilidae wasps can be distinguished from most other families from the presence of 2 mesofurcal pits rather than 1. Members of the family are endoparasatoids, typically of the family Coccoidea.

== Taxonomy ==
Moranilidae was originally a subfamily of Pteromalidae before being elevated to family status. Moranilidae currently contains 2 subfamilies with 15 total genera.

- Moranilinae
  - Amoturella Girault, 1913
  - Aphobetus Howard, 1896
  - Australeunotus Girault, 1922
  - Australurios Girault, 1926
  - Eunotomyiia Girault, 1922
  - Globonila Bouček, 1988
  - Hirtonila Bouček, 1988
  - Ismaya Bouček, 1988
  - Kneva Bouček, 1988
  - Mnoonema Motschulsky, 1863
  - Moranila Cameron, 1883
  - Ophelosia Riley, 1890
  - Tomicobiella Girault, 1915
  - Tomicobomorpha Girault, 1915
- Tomocerodinae
  - Tomocerodes Girault, 1916
