= Paraphyly =

Type of taxonomic group

In this phylogenetic tree, the green group is paraphyletic; it is composed of a common ancestor (the lowest green vertical stem) and some of its descendants, but it excludes the blue group (a monophyletic group) which diverged from the green group.

In taxonomy, a paraphyly is a grouping that consists of the grouping's last common ancestor and some but not all of its descendant lineages. The grouping is said to be paraphyletic with respect to the excluded subgroups. In contrast, a monophyletic grouping (a clade) includes a common ancestor and all of its descendants.

The terms are commonly used in phylogenetics (a subfield of biology) and in the tree model of historical linguistics. Paraphyletic groups are identified by a combination of synapomorphies and symplesiomorphies. If many subgroups are missing from the named group, it is said to be polyparaphyletic.

The term gained currency during the debates of the 1960s and 1970s accompanying the rise of cladistics, having been coined by zoologist Willi Hennig to apply to well-known taxa like Reptilia (reptiles), which is paraphyletic with respect to birds. Reptilia contains the last common ancestor of reptiles and all descendants of that ancestor except for birds. Other commonly recognized paraphyletic groups include fish, monkeys, lizards, wasps, and crustaceans.

== Etymology ==
The term paraphyly, or paraphyletic, derives from the two Ancient Greek words παρά (pará), meaning "beside, near", and φῦλον (phûlon), meaning "genus, species", and refers to the situation in which one or several monophyletic subgroups of organisms (e.g., genera, species) are left apart from all other descendants of a unique common ancestor.

Conversely, the term monophyly, or monophyletic, builds on the Ancient Greek prefix μόνος (mónos), meaning "alone, only, unique", and refers to the fact that a monophyletic group includes organisms consisting of all the descendants of a unique common ancestor.

By comparison, the term polyphyly, or polyphyletic, uses the Ancient Greek prefix πολύς (polús), meaning "many, a lot of", and refers to the fact that a polyphyletic group includes organisms arising from multiple ancestral sources.

== Phylogenetics ==
Cladogram of the primates, showing a monophyly (the simians, in yellow), a paraphyly (the prosimians, in blue, including the red patch), and a polyphyly (the night-active primates, the lorises and the tarsiers, in red). "Monkeys" too are paraphyletic if apes and humans are excluded.

=== In cladistics ===
Groups that include all the descendants of a common ancestor are said to be monophyletic. A paraphyletic group is a monophyletic group from which one or more subsidiary clades (monophyletic groups) are excluded to form a separate group. Philosopher of science Marc Ereshefsky has argued that paraphyletic taxa are the result of anagenesis in the excluded group or groups. A cladistic approach normally does not grant paraphyletic assemblages the status of "groups", nor does it reify them with explanations, as in cladistics they are not seen as the actual products of evolutionary events.

A group whose identifying features evolved convergently in two or more lineages is polyphyletic (Greek πολύς [polys], "many"). More broadly, any taxon that is not paraphyletic or monophyletic can be called polyphyletic. Empirically, the distinction between polyphyletic groups and paraphyletic groups is rather arbitrary, since the character states of common ancestors are inferences, not observations.

These terms were developed during the debates of the 1960s and 1970s accompanying the rise of cladistics.

Paraphyletic groupings are considered problematic by many taxonomists, as it is not possible to talk precisely about their phylogenetic relationships, their characteristic traits and literal extinction. Related terms are stem group, chronospecies, budding cladogenesis, anagenesis, or 'grade' groupings. Paraphyletic groups are often relics from outdated hypotheses of phylogenic relationships from before the rise of cladistics.

=== Examples ===
Wasps are paraphyletic, consisting of the clade Apocrita without ants and bees, which are not usually considered to be wasps; the sawflies ("Symphyta") too are paraphyletic, as the Apocrita are nested inside the Symphytan clades.

The prokaryotes (single-celled life forms without cell nuclei) are a paraphyletic grouping, because they exclude the eukaryotes, a descendant group. Bacteria and Archaea are prokaryotes, but archaea and eukaryotes share a common ancestor that is not ancestral to the bacteria. The prokaryote/eukaryote distinction was proposed by Edouard Chatton in 1937 and was generally accepted after being adopted by Roger Stanier and C.B. van Niel in 1962. The botanical code (the ICBN, now the ICN) abandoned consideration of bacterial nomenclature in 1975; currently, prokaryotic nomenclature is regulated under the ICNB with a starting date of 1 January 1980 (in contrast to a 1753 start date under the ICBN/ICN).

Among plants, dicotyledons (in the traditional sense) are paraphyletic because the group excludes monocotyledons. "Dicotyledon" has not been used as a botanic classification for decades, but is allowed as a synonym of Magnoliopsida. (Note: The history of flowering plant classification can be found under History of the classification of flowering plants.) Phylogenetic analysis indicates that the monocots are a development from a dicot ancestor. Excluding monocots from the dicots makes the latter a paraphyletic group.

Among animals, several familiar groups are not, in fact, clades. The order Artiodactyla (even-toed ungulates) as traditionally defined is paraphyletic because it excludes Cetaceans (whales, dolphins, etc.). Under the ranks of the ICZN Code, the two taxa are separate orders. Molecular studies, however, have shown that the Cetacea descend from artiodactyl ancestors, although the precise phylogeny within the order remains uncertain. Without the Cetaceans the Artiodactyls are paraphyletic. The class Reptilia is paraphyletic because it excludes birds (class Aves). Under a traditional classification, these two taxa are separate classes. However birds are sister taxon to a group of dinosaurs (part of Diapsida), both of which are "reptiles".

Osteichthyes, bony fish, are paraphyletic when circumscribed to include only Actinopterygii (ray-finned fish) and Sarcopterygii (lungfish, etc.), and to exclude tetrapods; more recently, Osteichthyes is treated as a clade, including the tetrapods.

The "wasps" are paraphyletic, consisting of the narrow-waisted Apocrita without the ants and bees. The sawflies (Symphyta) are similarly paraphyletic, forming all of the Hymenoptera except for the Apocrita, a clade deep within the sawfly tree. Crustaceans are not a clade because the Hexapoda (insects) are excluded. The modern clade that spans all of them is the Pancrustacea.

One of the goals of modern taxonomy over the past fifty years has been to eliminate paraphyletic taxa from formal classifications. Below is a partial list of obsolete taxa and informal groups that have been found to be paraphyletic.

Paraphyletic group	Excluded clades	Corresponding monophyletic taxon	References and notes
Prokaryota	Eukaryota	Cellular organisms	
Protista	Animalia, Embryophyta, Fungi	Eukaryota	
Chromista	Archaeplastida, Provora	Diaphoretickes	
Invertebrates	Vertebrata	Animalia	
Platyzoa	Lophotrochozoa, Mesozoa	Spiralia	
Fish	Tetrapoda	Vertebrata	
Reptilia	Aves and Mammales	Reptiliomorpha	
Lizards	Serpentes, Amphisbaenia	Squamata	
Plagiaulacidans	Cimolodonta, Arginbaataridae	Multituberculata	
Pelycosaurs	Therapsida	Synapsida	
Artiodactyla	Cetacea	Cetartiodactyla	
Archaeoceti	Neoceti	Cetacea	
Prosimii	Simiiformes	Primates	
Crustacea	Hexapoda	Pancrustacea	
Wasps	Formicidae, Anthophila	Apocrita	
Symphyta	Apocrita	Hymenoptera	
Parasitica	Aculeata	Apocrita	
Nautiloidea	Ammonoidea, Coleoidea	Cephalopoda	
Charophyta	Embryophyta	Streptophyta	
Dicotyledons	Monocotyledons	Angiospermae	
Moths	Papilionoidea	Lepidoptera	
Jellyfish	various hydrozoans	Medusozoa	
Rotifera	Acanthocephala	Syndermata	
Monkeys	Hominoidea	Simiiformes	
Antelopes	Bovini, Caprini, Ovibovini	Bovidae	
Apes	Homo	Hominoidea	

=== Paraphyly in species ===
Species have a special status in systematics as being an observable feature of nature itself and as the basic unit of classification. Some articulations of the phylogenetic species concept require species to be monophyletic, but paraphyletic species are common in nature, to the extent that they do not have a single common ancestor. Indeed, for sexually reproducing taxa, no species has a "single common ancestor" organism. Paraphyly is common in speciation, whereby a mother species (a paraspecies) gives rise to a daughter species without itself becoming extinct. Research indicates as many as 20 percent of all animal species and between 20 and 50 percent of plant species are paraphyletic. Accounting for these facts, some taxonomists argue that paraphyly is a trait of nature that should be acknowledged at higher taxonomic levels.

Cladists advocate a phylogenetic species concept that does not consider species to exhibit the properties of monophyly or paraphyly, concepts under that perspective which apply only to groups of species. They consider Zander's extension of the "paraphyletic species" argument to higher taxa to represent a category error.

=== Uses for paraphyletic groups ===
When the appearance of significant traits has led a subclade on an evolutionary path very divergent from that of a more inclusive clade, it often makes sense to study the paraphyletic group that remains without considering the larger clade. For example, the Neogene evolution of the Artiodactyla (even-toed ungulates, like deer, cows, pigs and hippopotamuses - Cervidae, Bovidae, Suidae and Hippopotamidae, the families that contain these various artiodactyls, are all monophyletic groups) has taken place in environments so different from that of the Cetacea (whales, dolphins, and porpoises) that the Artiodactyla are often studied in isolation even though the cetaceans are a descendant group. The prokaryote group is another example; it is paraphyletic because it is composed of two Domains (Eubacteria and Archaea) and excludes one (the eukaryotes). It is very useful because it has a clearly defined and significant distinction (absence of a cell nucleus, a plesiomorphy) from its excluded descendants.

Also, some systematists recognize paraphyletic groups as being involved in evolutionary transitions, the development of the first tetrapods from their ancestors for example. Any name given to these hypothetical ancestors to distinguish them from tetrapods—"fish", for example—necessarily picks out a paraphyletic group, because the descendant tetrapods are not included. Other systematists consider reification of paraphyletic groups to obscure inferred patterns of evolutionary history.

The term "evolutionary grade" is sometimes used for paraphyletic groups. Moreover, the concepts of monophyly, paraphyly, and polyphyly have been used in deducing key genes for barcoding of diverse group of species.

== Linguistics ==
The concept of paraphyly has also been applied to historical linguistics, where the methods of cladistics have found some utility in comparing languages. For instance, the Formosan languages form a paraphyletic group of the Austronesian languages because they consist of the nine branches of the Austronesian family that are not Malayo-Polynesian and are restricted to the island of Taiwan.

== See also ==
- Glossary of scientific naming
- Polyphyly

== Bibliography ==
- Simpson, Michael George (2006). Plant systematics. Burlington; San Diego; London: Academic Press. ISBN 978-0-12-644460-5.
- Paraphyletic groups as natural units of biological classification
