= Eutrichosomatidae =

Scientific classification
- Kingdom: Animalia
- Phylum: Arthropoda
- Clade: Pancrustacea
- Class: Insecta
- Order: Hymenoptera
- Superfamily: Chalcidoidea
- Family: Eutrichosomatidae; Peck, 1951

Family of parasitoid wasps

Eutrichosomatidae is a family of parasatoid chalcid wasps. Their bodies are black or metallic, with some species being covered in white hairs. The genera Eutrichosoma and Peckania are distributed across the New World while Collessina is only found in Australia. The genera Peckanius and Collessina are named after Dr Oswald Peck and D.H Colless respectively. Both genera contain one species each while Eutrichosoma contains 3.

== Biology ==
The first instar larvae are active planidia that parasitize developing seed-feeding weevils. Eggs are laid adjacent or away from the weevil egg and the larva must move to attach itself to the weevil larva. The larva remains capable of locomotion until the weevil pupates in order to reattach itself as their host molts. Due to their larval characteristics they are placed in a clade alongside Perilampidae and Eucharitidae.

== Taxonomy ==
Eutrichosomatidae was originally published as its own family it 1951, later in 1974 it was demoted to subfamily and placed in Pteromalidae before being elevated back to family status in 2022. It currently contains 3 genera with the genus Manineura being included in some sources:

- Collessina Bouček, 1975
- Eutrichosoma Ashmead, 1904
- Peckianus Bouček, 1975
