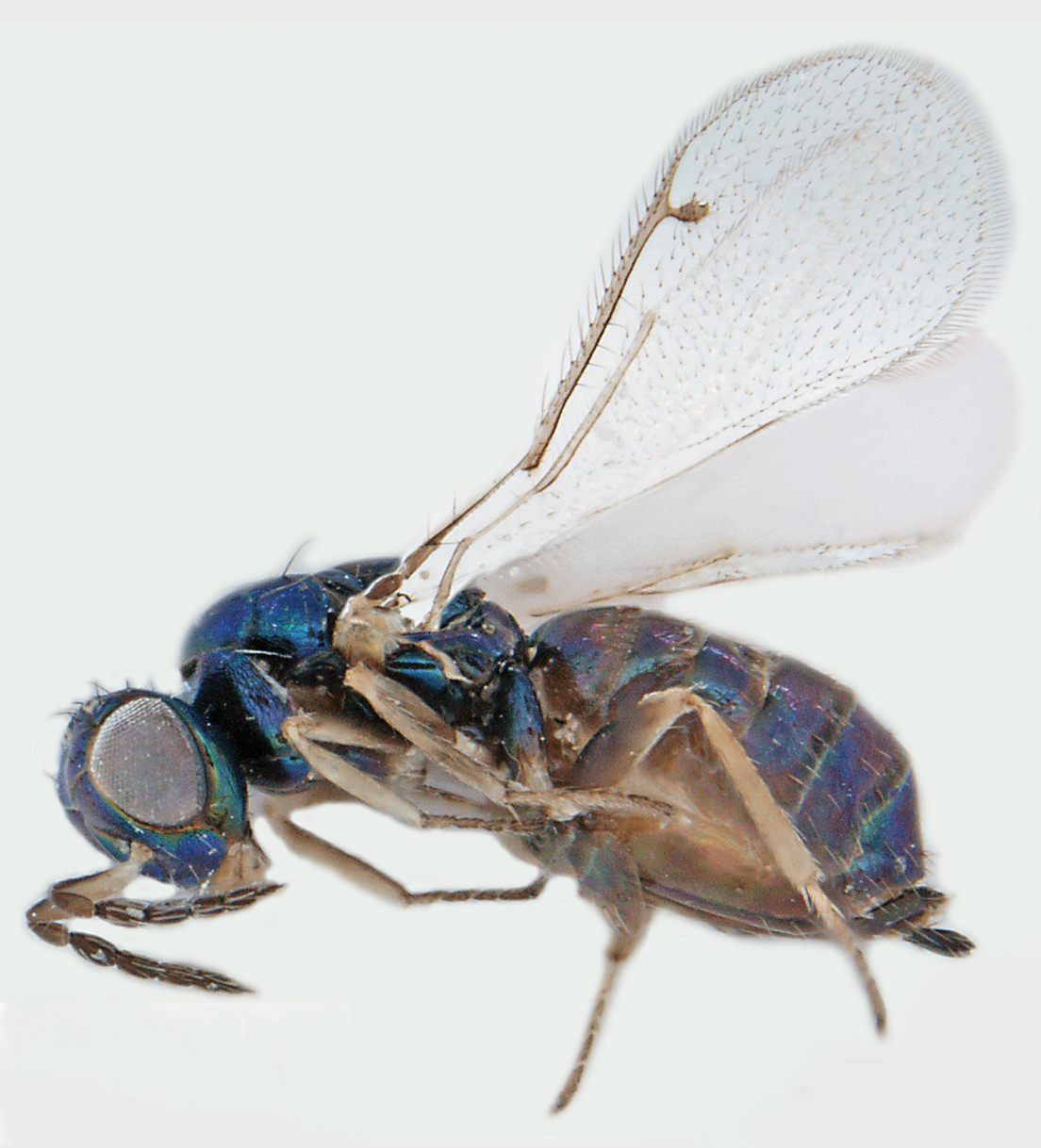
- Omphale cornula

Scientific classification
- Kingdom: Animalia
- Phylum: Arthropoda
- Clade: Pancrustacea
- Class: Insecta
- Order: Hymenoptera
- Suborder: Apocrita
- Infraorder: Proctotrupomorpha
- Superfamily: Chalcidoidea

Families
- See text

= Chalcid wasp =

Chalcid wasp Temporal range: Cretaceous-Present

Superfamily of wasps

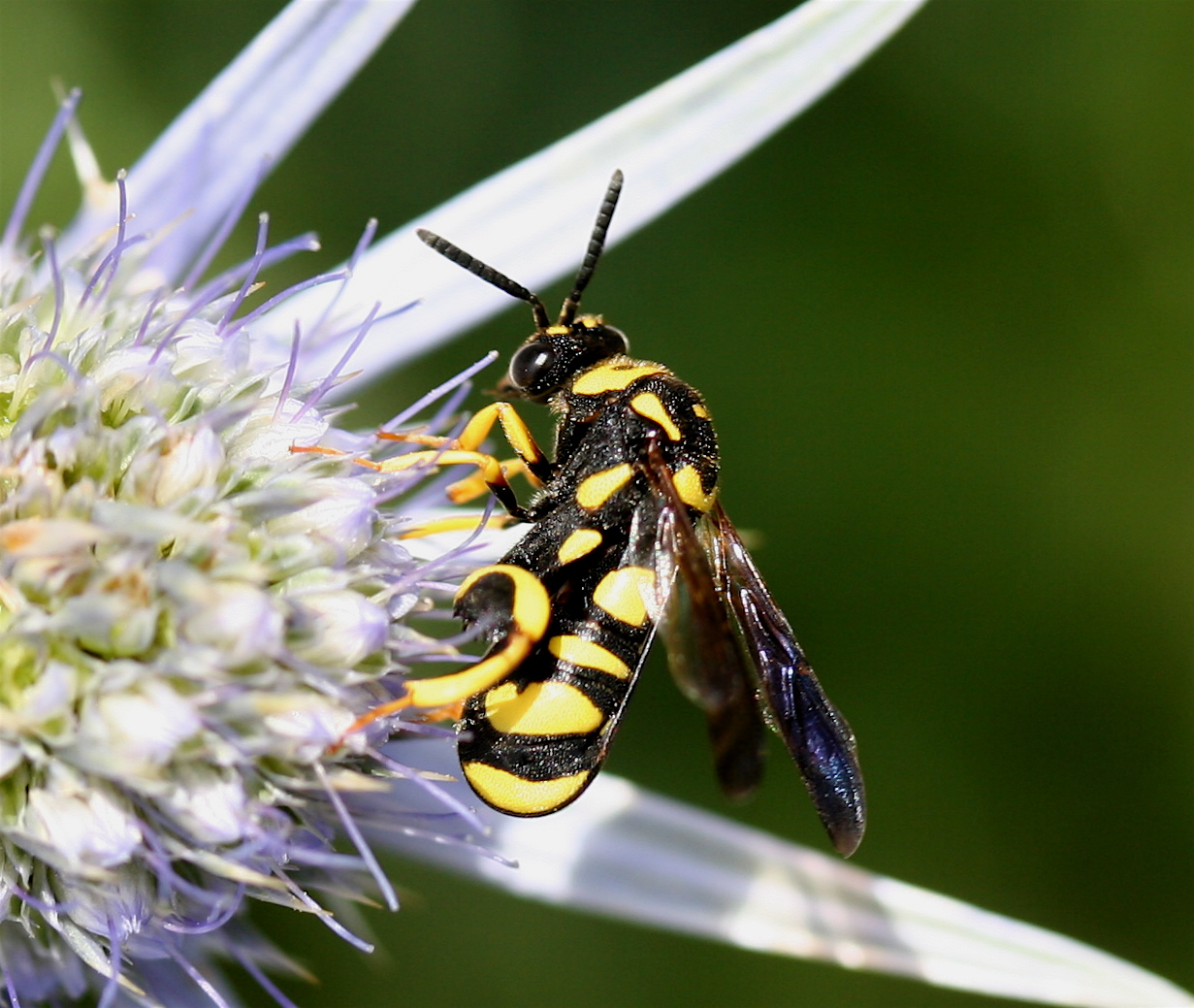
Leucospis sp. (Leucospidae)

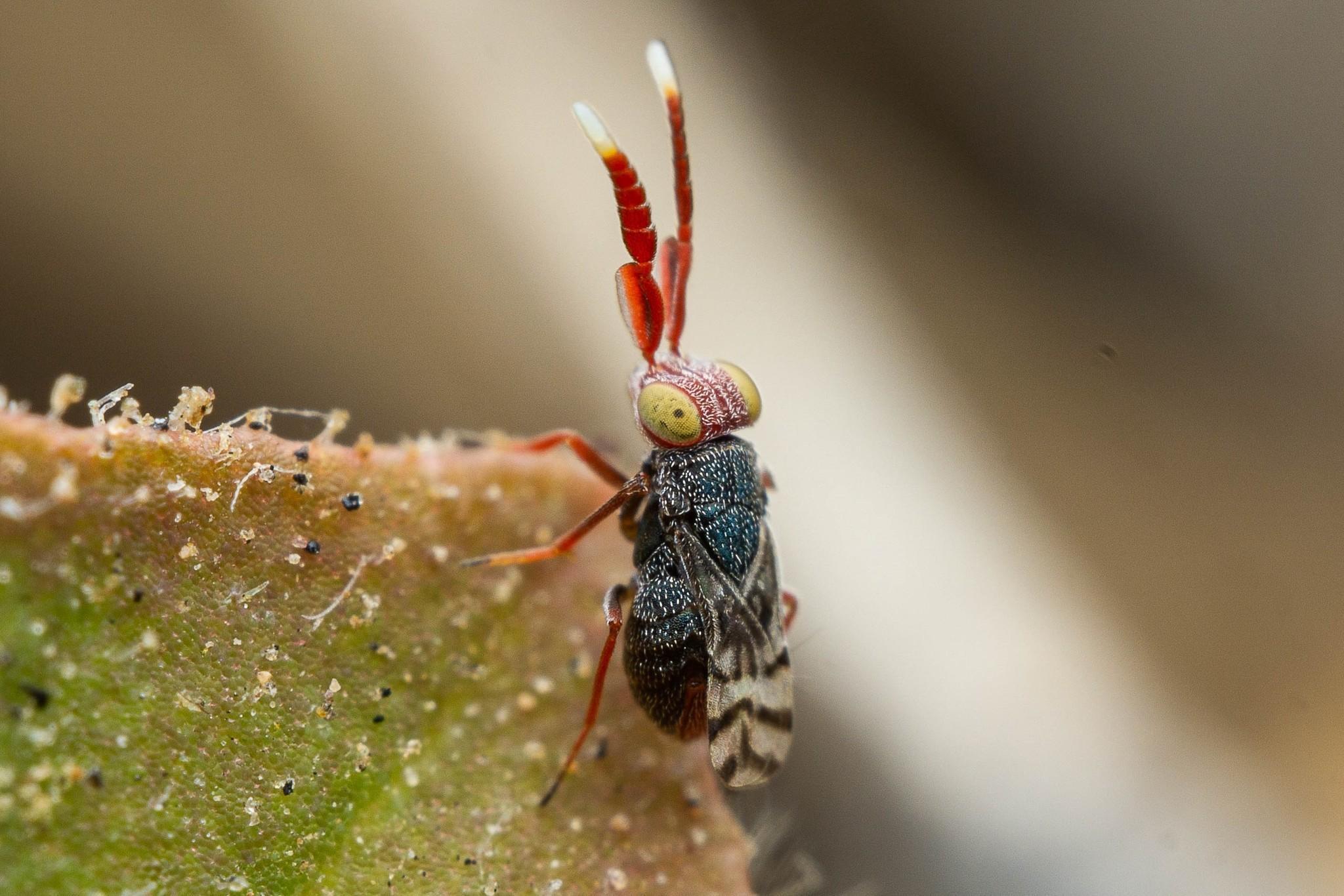
Dicarnosis erythrocephala (Encyrtidae)

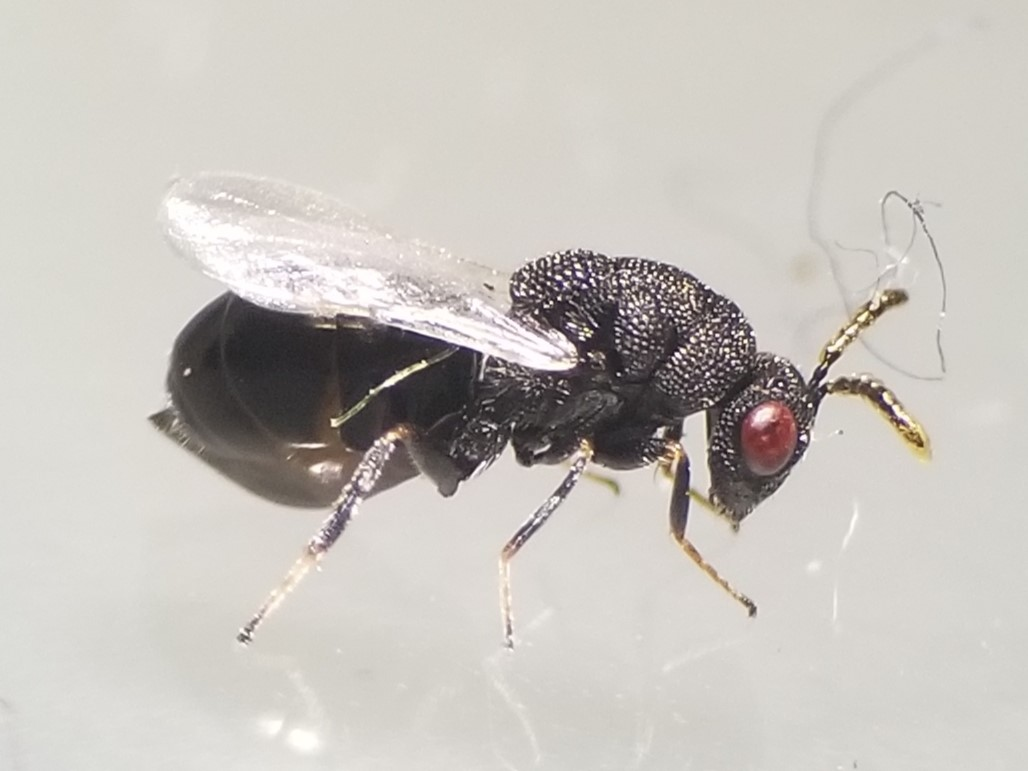
Eurytoma obtusiventris female, family Eurytomidae

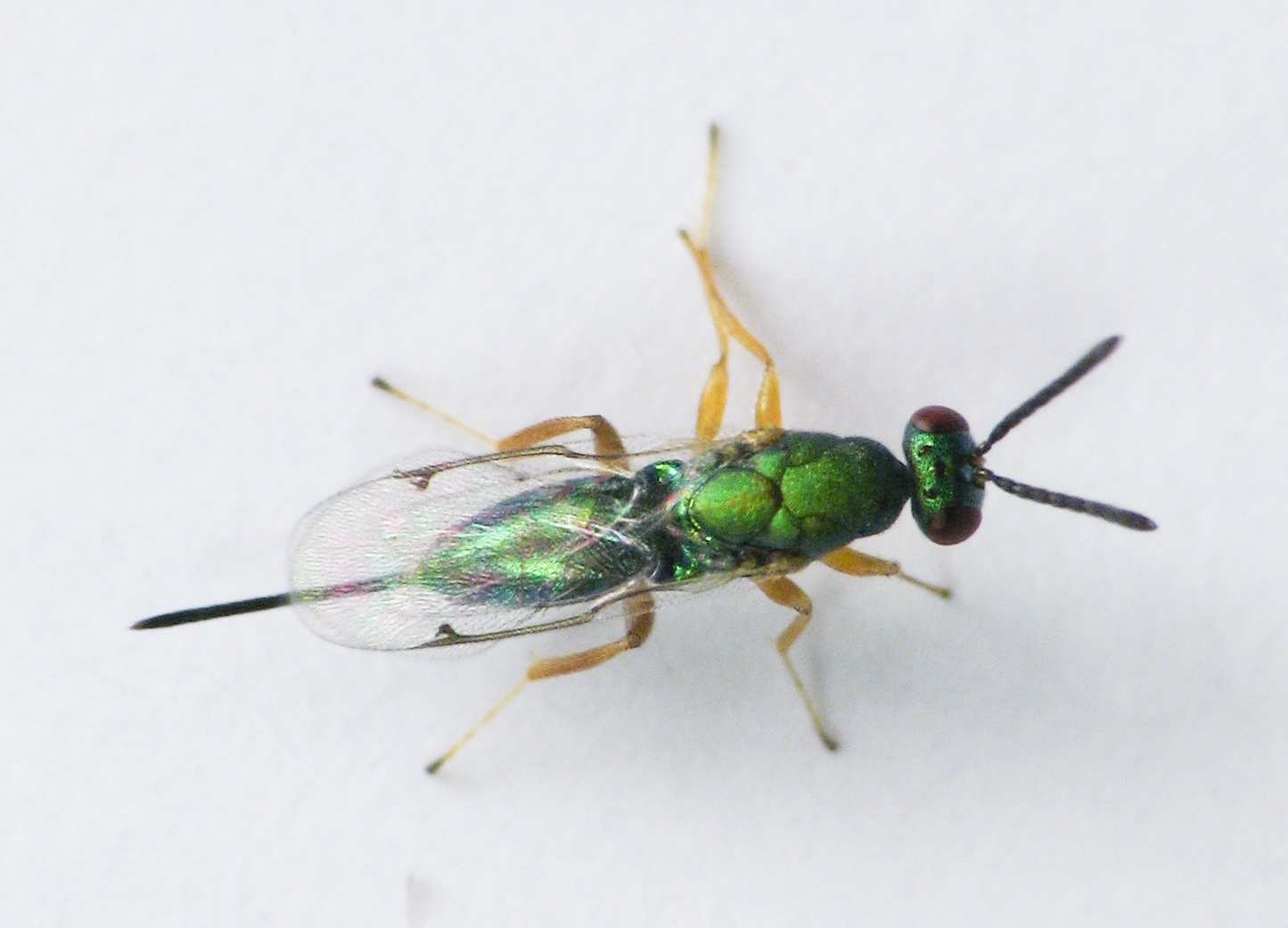
Torymus female, family Torymidae

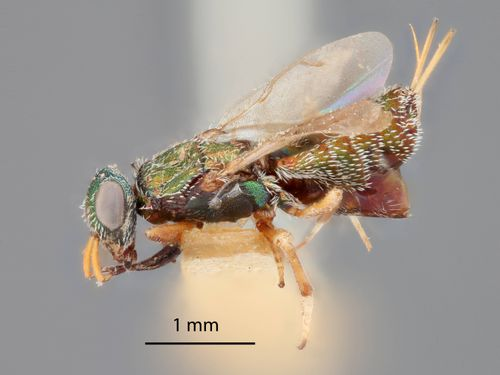
Eupelmus vuilleti (Eupelmidae) from Mali

Chalcid wasps (/ˈkælsɪd/, from Greek khalkos 'copper', for their metallic colour) are insects within the superfamily Chalcidoidea, part of the order Hymenoptera. The superfamily contains some 27,000 known species, and an estimated total diversity of more than 500,000 species, meaning the vast majority have yet to be discovered and described. The name "chalcid" is often confused with the name "chalcidid", though the latter refers strictly to one constituent family, the Chalcididae, rather than the superfamily as a whole; accordingly, most post 2010 publications use the name "chalcidoid" when referring to members of the superfamily.

Most chalcid wasps are parasitoids of other insects, though other life styles are known, with the herbivorous fig wasps acting as pollinators. Various species are used as biological pest control agents or in scientific research.

== Description ==
Chalcidoids are generally small wasps, averaging 1.5 mm (0.059 in) in length and usually being less than 3 mm (0.12 in). The body is often metallic in colour. The wings may be developed, reduced or absent. When the wings are developed, they have reduced venation or sometimes none at all.

However, the group is morphologically very diverse. Chalcidoids range in size from up to 41.7 mm (1.64 in) long (females of the pelecinellid Doddifoenus wallacei, this length includes the ovipositor) to merely 0.13 mm (0.0051 in) long (males of the mymarid Dicopomorpha echmepterygis). Various lineages have convergently evolved features such as enlarged femora, enlarged acropleura, reduced numbers of antennal and tarsal segments, reduced wings or reduced wing venation. Some have significant sexual dimorphism: male fig wasps are "turtle-like fighting machines" that are very different to the females, while males of the aforementioned D. echmepterygis lack eyes, ocelli, mouthparts, antennal flagella or wings.

== Ecology ==
Most chalcidoids are parasitoids, their hosts including insects, spiders, ticks and mites, pseudoscorpions and even gall-forming nematodes. Some species parasitise a wide range of hosts, while others have a narrow host range. They attack host life stages ranging from eggs to adults. The superfamily includes primary, secondary and tertiary parasitoids, both ecto- and endoparasitoids, and both solitary and gregarious parasitoids.

There are also herbivorous chalcidoids within the families of Agaonidae, Epichrysomallidae, Eurytomidae, Eulophidae, Melanosomellidae, Ormyridae, Pteromalidae, Tanaostigmatidae and Torymidae. Agaonidae only develop within figs.

Predation is exhibited by larvae of some Encyrtidae (prey on coccid eggs) and some Eurytomidae (prey on Cynipidae larvae).

== Importance ==
Chalcidoidea is one of the most important taxa of biological control agents. They are used to control pest insects in both natural and agricultural ecosystems. Some herbivorous species are also used in biological control, such as the melanosomellid Trichilogaster acaciaelongifoliae for control of the weed Acacia longifolia.

There are also chalcidoids that are agricultural pests themselves, mainly attacking plant seeds. Bruchophagus attack seeds of legumes (e.g. alfalfa), Systole attack seeds of Apiaceae used as spices (e.g. coriander) and Megastigmus attack seeds of Pinaceae grown in plantations.

Females of family Agaonidae are important as pollinators of figs.

Some chalcidoids, especially those in genera Trichogramma (Trichogrammatidae) and Nasonia (Pteromalidae) are model organisms in scientific research. They have been used to study sex determination, the influence of bacterial endosymbionts and the genetics of speciation. The genome of moth parasitoid Copidosoma floridanum was sequenced as part of the i5K project.

== Taxonomy ==
Chalcidoidea is a superfamily of Hymenoptera, whose family constituency is in constant flux, as new hypotheses of relationships are constantly being proposed and rejected; with the advent of molecular systematics, recent revisions (post-2020) have substantially revised the classification in use today.

There are fifty extant families recognized at present:

- Agaonidae Walker, 1846
- Aphelinidae Thomson, 1876
- Azotidae Nikolskaya & Yasnosh, 1966
- Baeomorphidae Yoshimoto, 1975 (formerly Rotoitidae)
- Boucekiidae Gibson, 2003 (formerly part of Pteromalidae)
- Calesidae Mercet, 1929
- Ceidae Boucek, 1961 (formerly part of Pteromalidae)
- Cerocephalidae Gahan, 1946 (formerly part of Pteromalidae)
- Chalcedectidae Ashmead, 1904 (formerly part of Pteromalidae)
- Chalcididae Latreille, 1817
- Chrysolampidae Dalla Torre, 1898 (formerly part of Perilampidae)
- Cleonymidae Walker, 1837 (formerly part of Pteromalidae)
- Coelocybidae Boucek, 1988 (formerly part of Pteromalidae)
- Cynipencyrtidae Trjapitzin, 1973
- Diparidae Thomson, 1876 (formerly part of Pteromalidae)
- Encyrtidae Walker, 1837
- Epichrysomallidae Hill & Riek, 1967 (formerly part of Pteromalidae)
- Eucharitidae Latreille, 1809
- Eulophidae Westwood, 1829
- Eunotidae Ashmead, 1904 (formerly part of Pteromalidae)
- Eupelmidae Walker, 1833
- Eurytomidae Walker, 1832
- Eutrichosomatidae Peck, 1951 (formerly part of Pteromalidae)
- Herbertiidae Boucek, 1988 (formerly part of Pteromalidae)
- Hetreulophidae Girault, 1915 (formerly part of Pteromalidae)
- Heydeniidae Hedqvist, 1961 (formerly part of Pteromalidae)
- Idioporidae LaSalle, Polaszek & Noyes, 1997 (formerly part of Pteromalidae)
- Leucospidae Fabricius, 1775
- Lyciscidae Boucek, 1958 (formerly part of Pteromalidae)
- Macromesidae Graham, 1959 (formerly part of Pteromalidae)
- Megastigmidae Thomson, 1876
- Melanosomellidae Girault, 1913 (formerly part of Pteromalidae)
- Metapelmatidae Boucek, 1988 (formerly part of Eupelmidae)
- Moranilidae Boucek, 1988 (formerly part of Pteromalidae)
- Mymaridae Haliday, 1833
- Neanastatidae Kalina, 1984 (formerly part of Eupelmidae)
- Neodiparidae Boucek, 1961 (formerly part of Pteromalidae)
- Ooderidae Boucek, 1958 (formerly part of Pteromalidae)
- Ormyridae Förster, 1856
- Pelecinellidae Ashmead, 1895 (formerly part of Pteromalidae)
- Perilampidae Latreille, 1809
- Pirenidae Haliday, 1844 (including Eriaporidae) (formerly part of Pteromalidae)
- Pteromalidae Dalman, 1820
- Signiphoridae Ashmead, 1880
- Spalangiidae Haliday, 1833 (formerly part of Pteromalidae)
- Systasidae Boucek, 1988 (formerly part of Pteromalidae)
- Tanaostigmatidae Howard, 1890
- Tetracampidae Förster, 1856
- Torymidae Walker, 1833
- Trichogrammatidae Haliday, 1851

There are also three extinct families:

- †Diversinitidae Haas, Burks & Krogmann, 2018
- †Leptoomidae Gibson, 2023
- †Protoitidae Ulmer & Krogmann, 2023

Of these families, at least five were known to be artificial groups (paraphyletic), and have been divided into several families. The most problematic, Pteromalidae, has recently been split into 24 families, and Eupelmidae into three families. The extinct family Khutelchalcididae was also removed from the superfamily in 2022.

== Identification ==
- Burks, R.A., Heraty, J.M., Gibson, G.A.P., Rasplus, J.-Y., Woolley, J.B., Janšta, P., Fusu, L., Mitroiu, M.-D. 2025. Chapter 7. Key to families, pp. 135–169. In Heraty, J.M. and Woolley, J.B. (ed.) Chalcidoidea of the World. CABI International, Wallingford, UK.
