= Neodiparidae =

Scientific classification
- Kingdom: Animalia
- Phylum: Arthropoda
- Class: Insecta
- Order: Hymenoptera
- Superfamily: Chalcidoidea
- Family: Neodiparidae; Bouček, 1961

Family of parasitic wasps

Neodiparidae is a family of parasitic wasps. It was formerly a subfamily of Pteromalidae, but was promoted to its own family in 2022. It is found in the Afrotropical and Palearctic regions, and contains two subfamilies, which are both monotypic: Elatoidinae (Bouček, 1988) and Neodiparinae (Erdös, 1955). These wasps are parasites of species of the genera Eriococcus, Phenococcus, Biorhiza, and Dryocosmus.

== Anatomy ==
While species of the subfamilies Elatoidinae and Neodiparinae do have significant anatomical differences, species of both subfamilies have legs with five tarsomeres and a clypeus without a transverse subapical groove.
