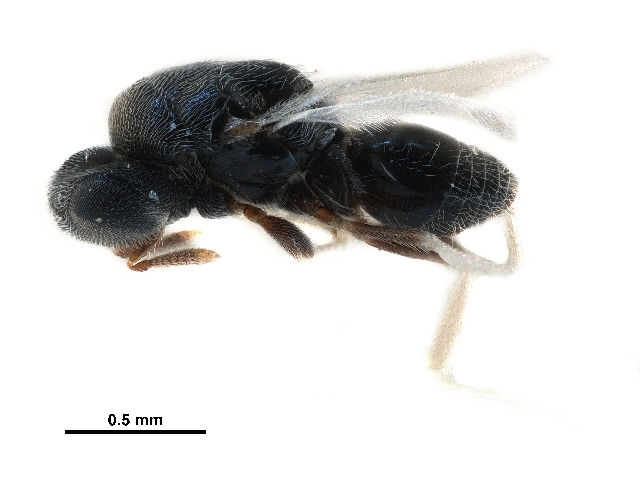
- Herbertia sp.

Scientific classification
- Kingdom: Animalia
- Phylum: Arthropoda
- Clade: Pancrustacea
- Class: Insecta
- Order: Hymenoptera
- Superfamily: Chalcidoidea
- Family: Herbertiidae; Bouček, 1988

= Herbertiidae =

Family of wasps

Herbertiidae is a family of chalcidoid wasps. In 2022, this family was described based on an analysis of a combination of molecular, morphological, and life history data.

== Description ==
Small, dark wasps.

== Taxonomy ==
Herbertiidae contains the following genera:

- Exolabrum
- Herbertia
- Versolabrum (extinct)
