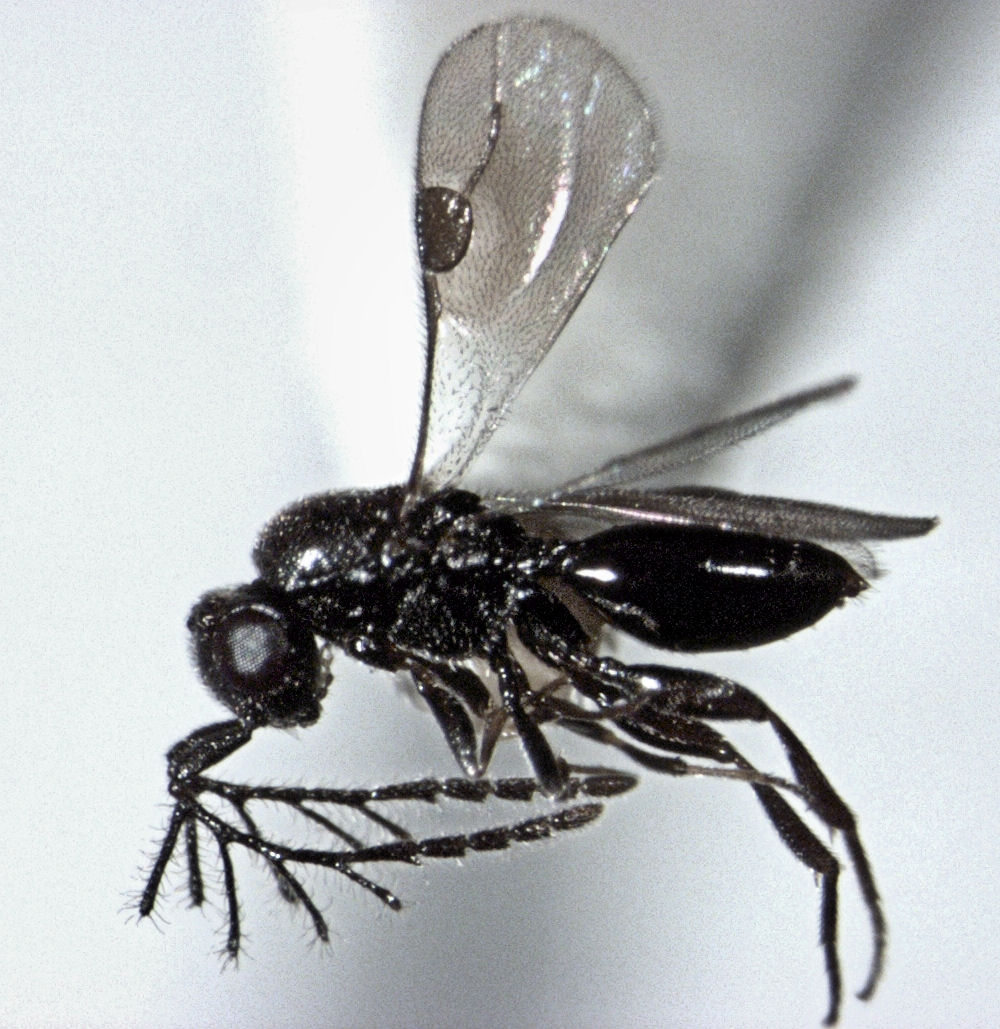
- Male Dendrocerus sp.

Scientific classification
- Kingdom: Animalia
- Phylum: Arthropoda
- Clade: Pancrustacea
- Class: Insecta
- Order: Hymenoptera
- Superfamily: Ceraphronoidea; Haliday, 1833

Families
- Ceraphronidae; Megaspilidae

= Ceraphronoidea =

Ceraphronoidea Temporal range: Cretaceous–Recent

Superfamily of wasps

The Ceraphronoidea are a small hymenopteran superfamily that includes only two families, and a total of some 800 species, though a great many species are still undescribed. It is a poorly known group as a whole, and most are believed to be parasitoid or hyperparasitoids.

The two families are unified by several characters, the most visible of which is their wing venation is greatly reduced in a very specific and unique way; the costal and radial veins have fused so no costal cell is present, a short break occurs at the stigma, and the only vein in the wing membrane itself is the radial sector, which is short and curved, arising from the stigma. The taxon was erected by Alexander Henry Haliday.

Some fossil families that were formerly assigned to this group have since been reassigned elsewhere including Aptenoperissidae, Radiophronidae and Stigmaphronidae.
