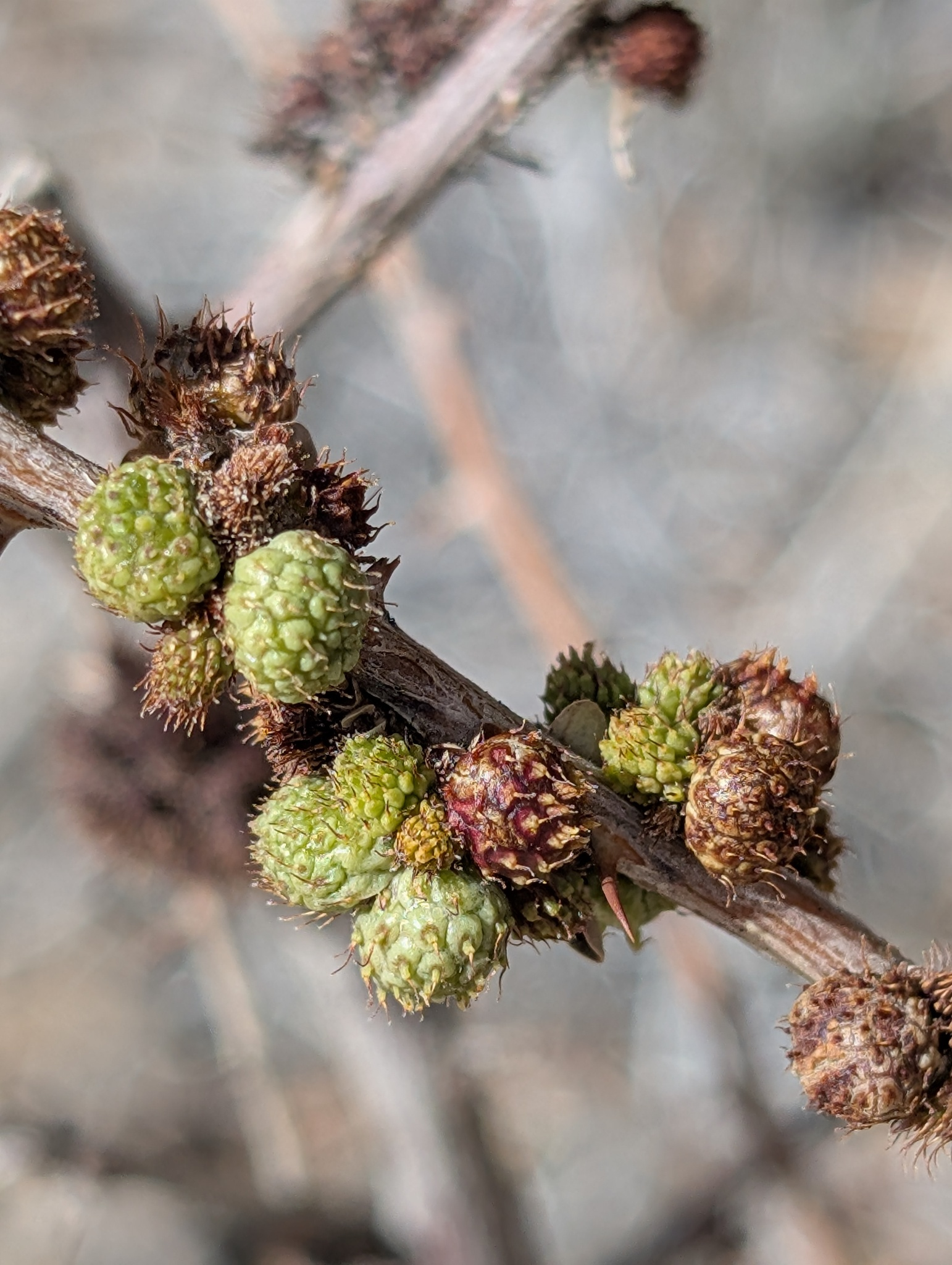
- Galls produced by Tanaostigmodes howardii

Scientific classification
- Kingdom: Animalia
- Phylum: Arthropoda
- Class: Insecta
- Order: Hymenoptera
- Superfamily: Chalcidoidea
- Family: Tanaostigmatidae; Howard, 1890

Genera
- Enigmencyrtus; Leptoomus; Liebeliella; Microprobolos; Minapis; Protanaostigma; Tanaoneura; Tanaostigma; Tanaostigmodes

= Tanaostigmatidae =

Family of wasps

The Tanaostigmatidae are a small family of parasitic wasps in the superfamily Chalcidoidea. They are almost exclusively phytophagous insects, forming galls in plant stems, leaves, or seeds. The some 90 species in 9 genera are primarily tropical and subtropical.

They are typically short, squat wasps, best recognized by a protruding prepectus, and the mesonotum is often strongly arched, so the pronotum is nearly vertical.
