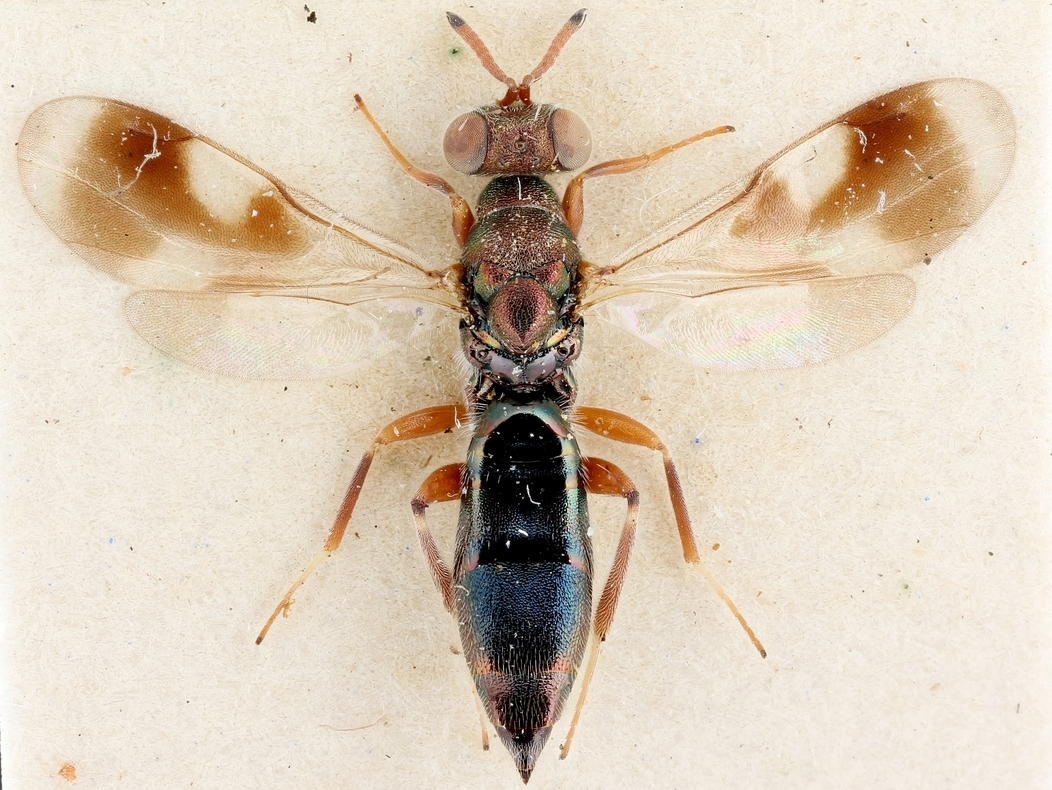
- Cleonymus laticornis

Scientific classification
- Kingdom: Animalia
- Phylum: Arthropoda
- Class: Insecta
- Order: Hymenoptera
- Suborder: Apocrita
- Infraorder: Proctotrupomorpha
- Superfamily: Chalcidoidea
- Family: Cleonymidae; Walker, 1837

Genera
- See text

= Cleonymidae =

Family of wasps

Cleonymidae is a parasitic wasp family formerly treated as a subfamily within Pteromalidae.

== Genera ==
- Agrilocida
- Callocleonymus
- Cleonymus
- Dasycleonymus
- Notanisus
- Zolotarewskya
