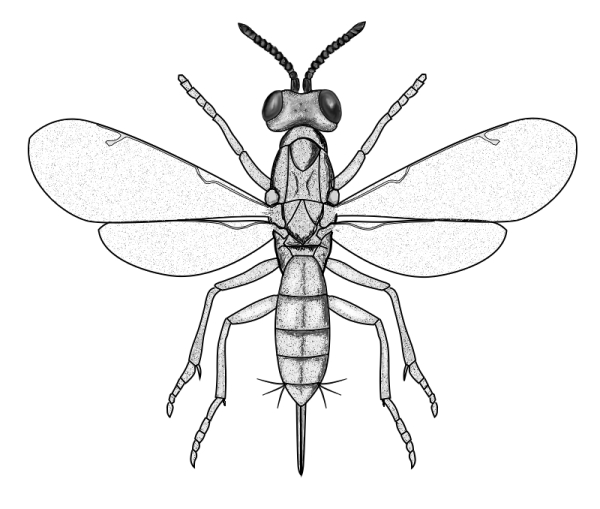
- Eupelmus urozonus

Scientific classification
- Kingdom: Animalia
- Phylum: Arthropoda
- Clade: Pancrustacea
- Class: Insecta
- Order: Hymenoptera
- Superfamily: Chalcidoidea
- Family: Eupelmidae; Walker, 1833

Subfamilies
- Calosotinae; Eupelminae; Eusandalinae

= Eupelmidae =

Family of wasps

Eupelmidae is a family of parasitic wasps in the superfamily Chalcidoidea. The larvae of the majority are primary parasitoids, commonly on beetle larvae, though many other hosts are attacked, including spiders. Details of the life history varies considerably (e.g., some attack eggs and others are hyperparasites). They are found throughout the world in virtually all habitats.

== Description ==
They are somewhat variable in appearance, though a fair number of species are relatively easy to separate from other Chalcidoidea by the possession of a medially concave mesonotum. They also have the unusual tendency to arch the body strongly upwards when dead, with the head and metasoma often nearly touching above the thorax.

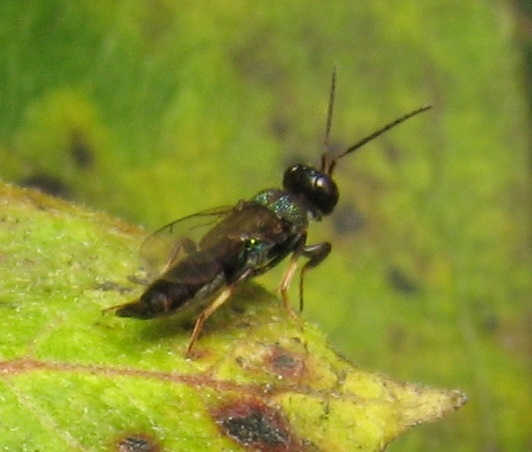
Balcha indica

== Taxonomy ==
In 2022, genera previously placed in this family were moved to the families Metapelmatidae and Neanastatidae. As presently defined, there are 39 genera in Eupelmidae.

=== Subfamily Calosotinae ===
Genera remaining after the loss of five genera to Eusandalinae:

- Balcha Walker, 1862
- Calosota Curtis, 1836
- Tanythorax Gibson, 1989

=== Subfamily Eupelminae ===
Genera:

- Anastatus Motschulsky, 1859
- Arachnophaga Motschulsky, 1859
- Australoodera Ashmead, 1896
- Brasema Cameron, 1884
- Calymmochilus Masi, 1919
- Cervicosus Gibson, 1995
- Coryptilus Gibson, 1995
- Ecnomocephala Gibson, 1995
- Enigmapelma Gibson, 1995
- Eueupelmus Girault, 1931
- Eupelmus Dalman, 1820
- Eutreptopelma Gibson, 1995
- Lecaniobius Ashmead, 1896
- Lutnes Cameron, 1884
- Macreupelmus Ashmead, 1896
- Merostenus Walker, 1837
- Mesocomys Cameron, 1905
- Omeganastatus Gibson, 1995
- Ooderella Cameron, 1905
- Oozetetes De Santis, 1970
- Paranastatus Masi, 1917
- Phenaceupelmus Gibson, 1995
- Phlebopenes Perty, 1833
- Psomizopelma Gibson, 1995
- Rhinoeupelmus Gibson, 1995
- Taphronotus Gibson, 1995
- Tineobiopsis Gibson, 1995
- Tineobius Ashmead, 1896
- Uropelma Sharkov, 1988
- Xenanastatus Bouček, 1988
- Zaischnopsis Ashmead, 1904

=== Subfamily Eusandalinae ===
Genera:

- Archaeopelma Gibson, 1989
- Eusandalum Ratzeburg, 1852
- Licrooides Gibson, 1989
- Paraeusandalum Gibson, 1989
- Pentacladia Westwood, 1835
