= External morphology of adult Chalcidoidea =

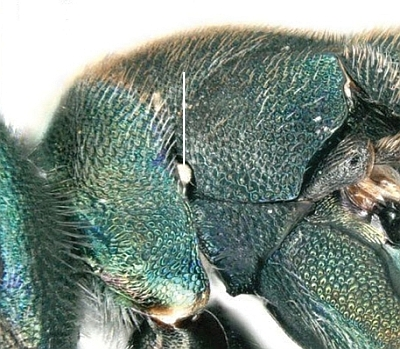
Solenura mesosoma (lateral view)

The superfamily Chalcidoidea is a megadiverse group of parasitic wasps that share these features:

- Wings reduced (sometimes absent); at most the forewing venation comprises a simple arrangement of the following: submarginal vein, marginal vein, stigmal vein and postmarginal vein.
- On the mesosoma, the pronotum is separated from the mesopleuron by the prepectus; usually the pronotum does not extend to the tegula.
- If the mesothoracic spiracle is visible, its position (at or near the juncture of the mesoscutum, the pronotum, and the prepectus) can be used to distinguish chalcidoids from other parasitic Apocrita.

== Chalcidoid morphology ==
Chalcidoid wasps are small wasps (most within the range 0.5–5 mm). However the group does include the smallest known insect (Dicopomorpha echmepterygis males have a body length of 0.14–0.24 mm); the largest chalcidoids include Leucospis gigas with a body length of up to 21 mm and Doddifoenus wallacei with a body length of up to 19.6 mm.

Body shape varies considerably; Aenasius and Pentelicus species are short and stocky; Aenasius is a parasitoid of early-instar mealybug nymphs, Pentelicus parasitises pupae of Sphindidae (slime mold beetles). On the other hand, Doddifoenus and Leptofoenus are long and thin, and probably parasitise the wood-boring larvae of xylophagous beetles.

As in other Apocrita, the thorax is fused to the first abdominal segment (propodeum) to form the mesosoma. In dorsal view (from above), starting at the head, the pronotum, mesoscutum, axillae, and scutellum are generally visible, but when the wings are folded over the body, the metanotum, propodeum, and metasoma are often obscured. The tegula covers the base of the wing.

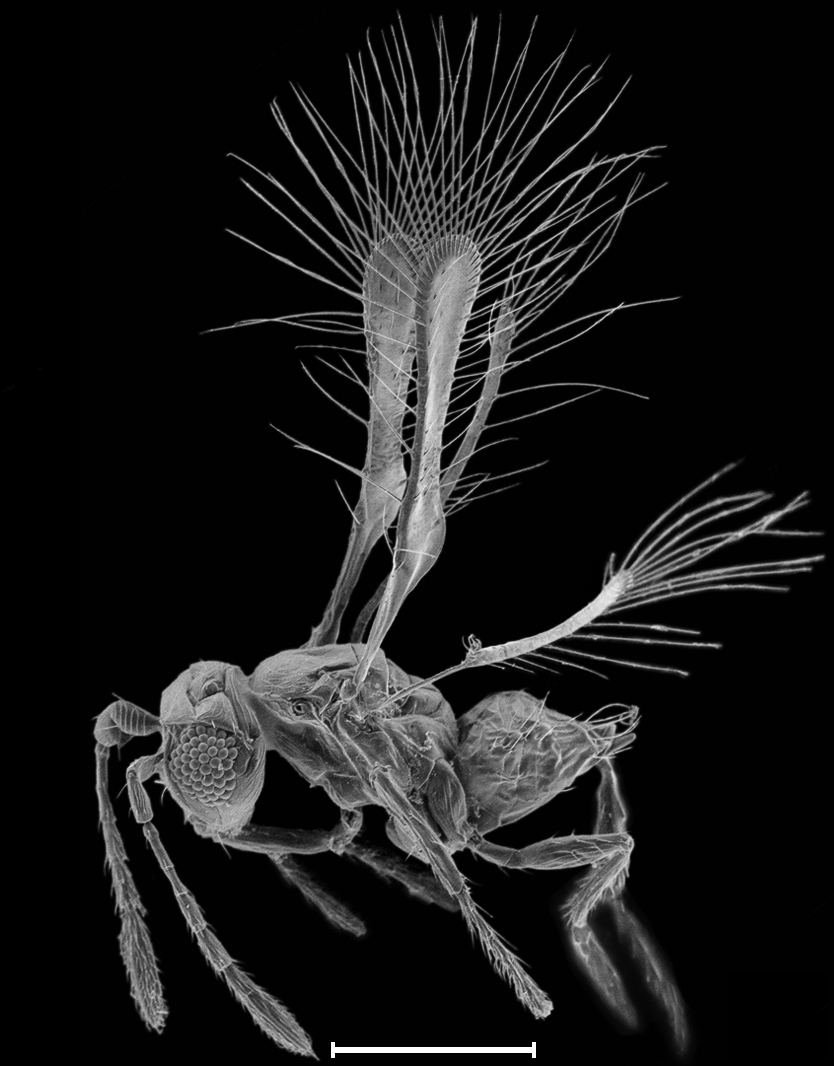
A small chalcidoid wasp (Tinkerbella nana). Scale bar 0.1 mm

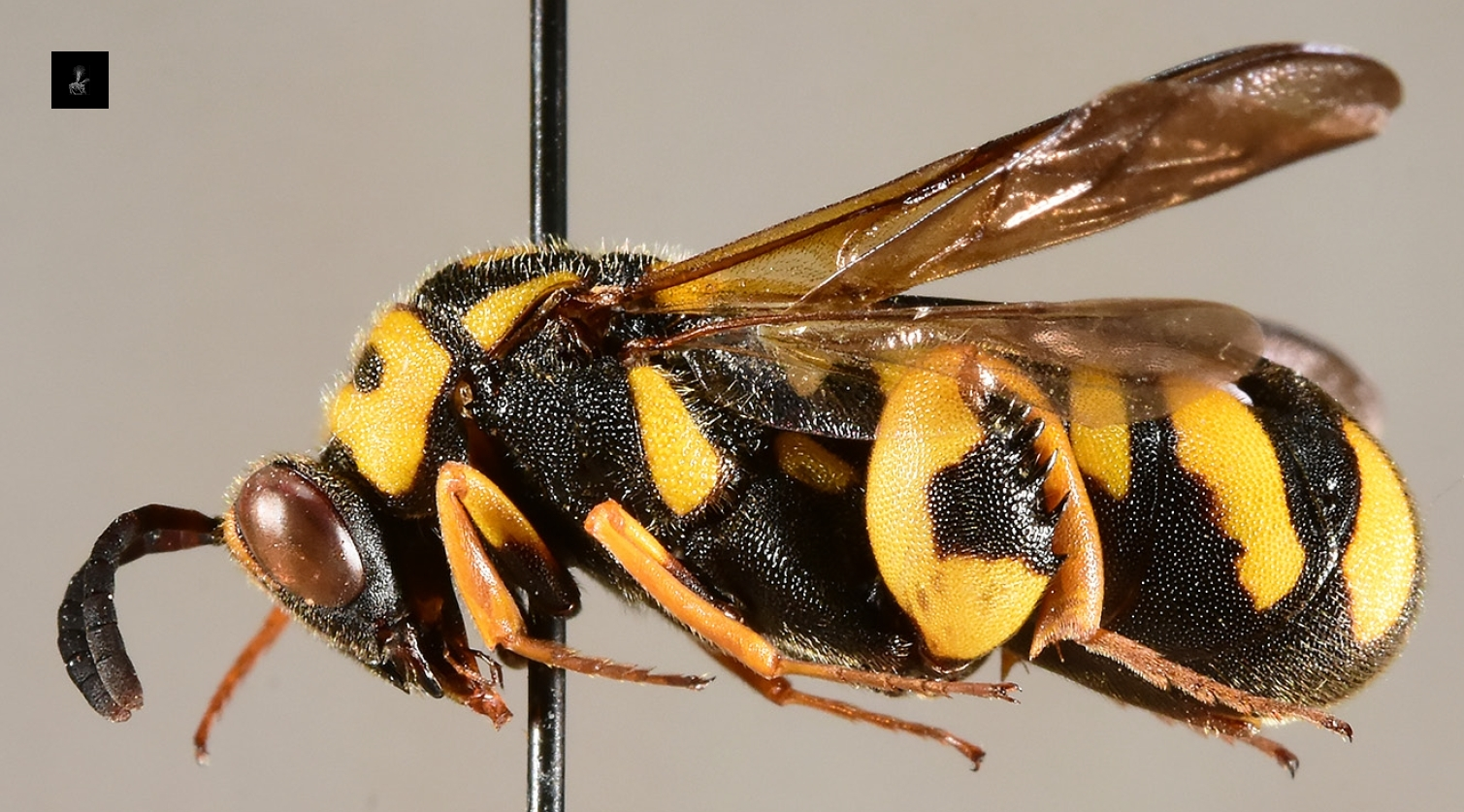
A large chalcidoid wasp (Leucospis gigas) with inset showing the relative size of Tinkerbella nana. The black square represents 1 mm x 1 mm.

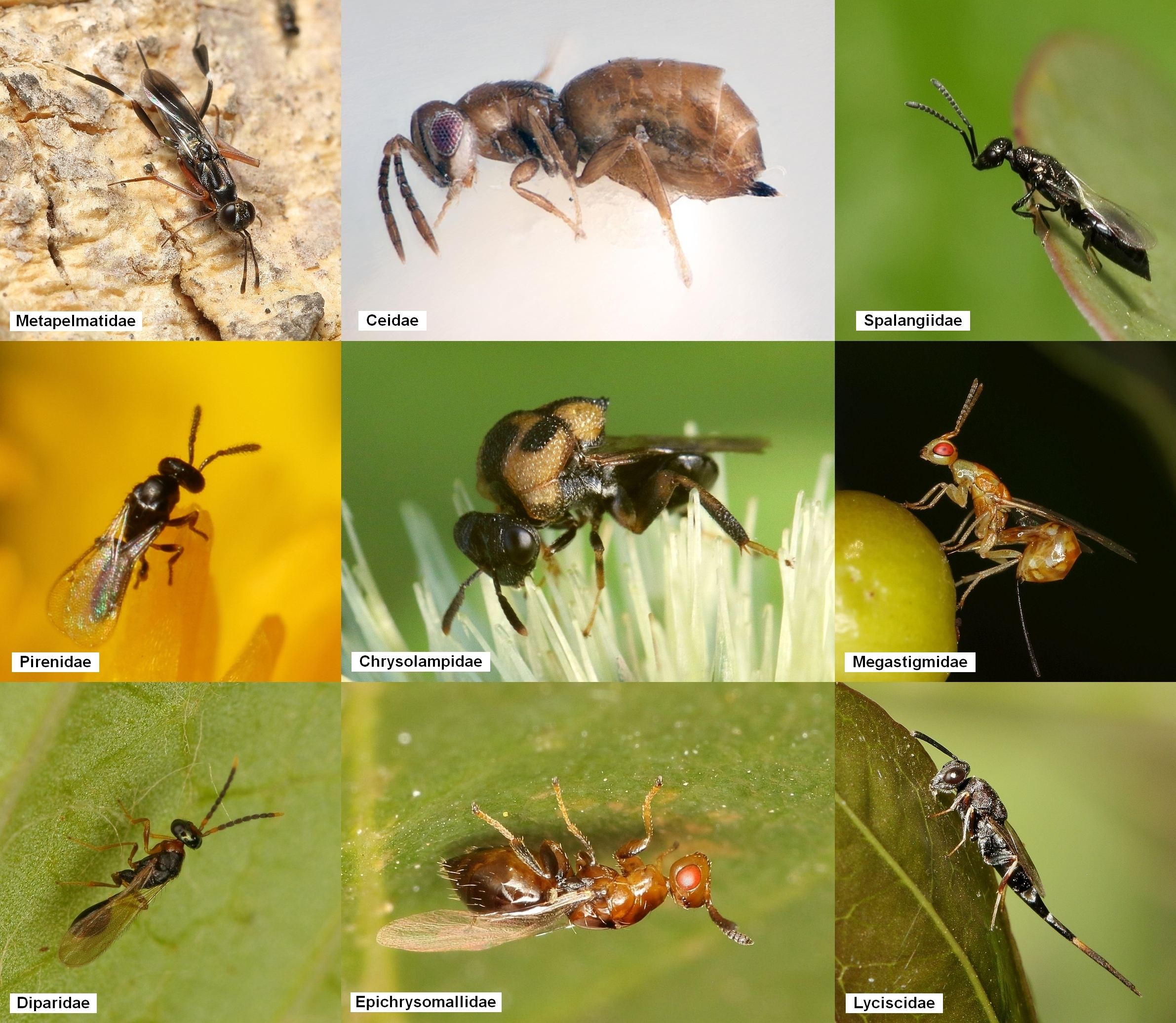
Diversity in the morphology of chalcidoid wasps

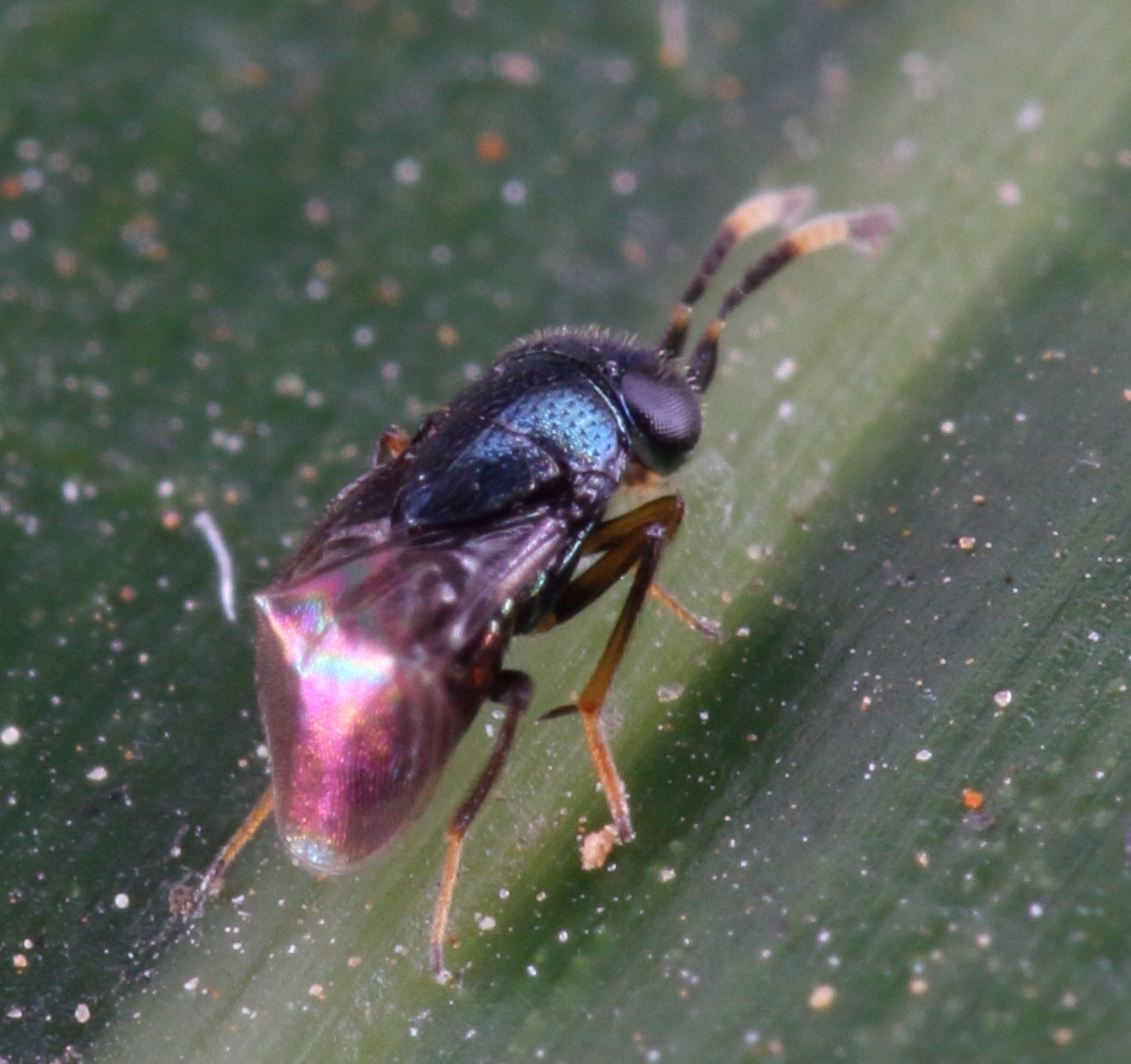
Pentelicus sp.

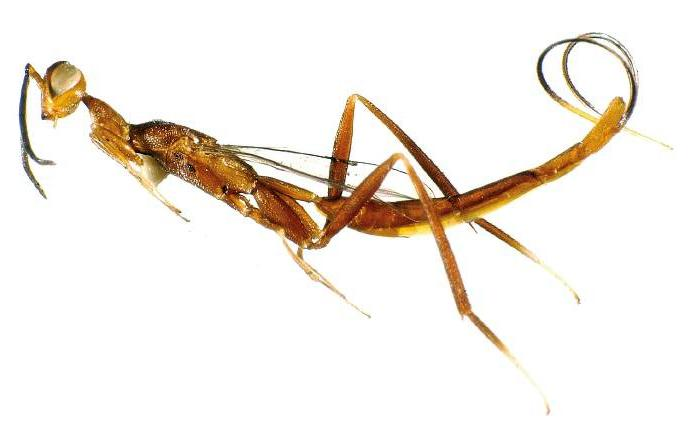
Leptofoenus rufus

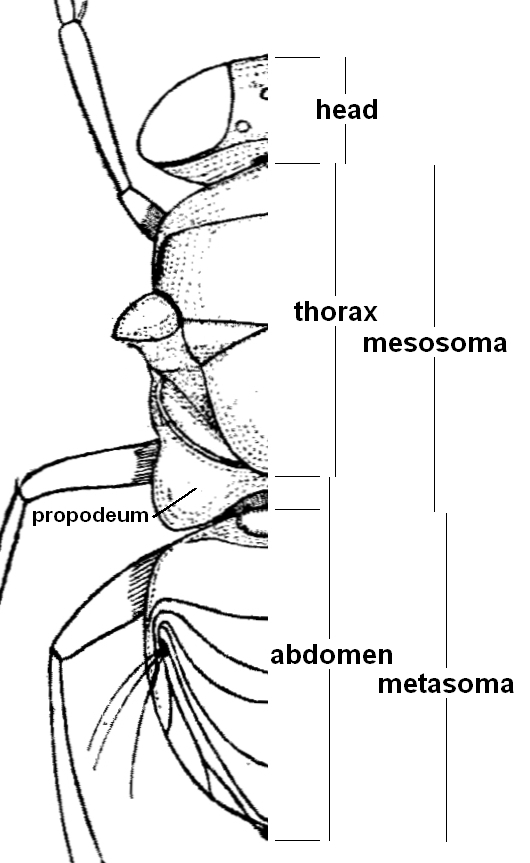
Encyrtid body showing the propodeum fused with the thorax to form the mesosoma

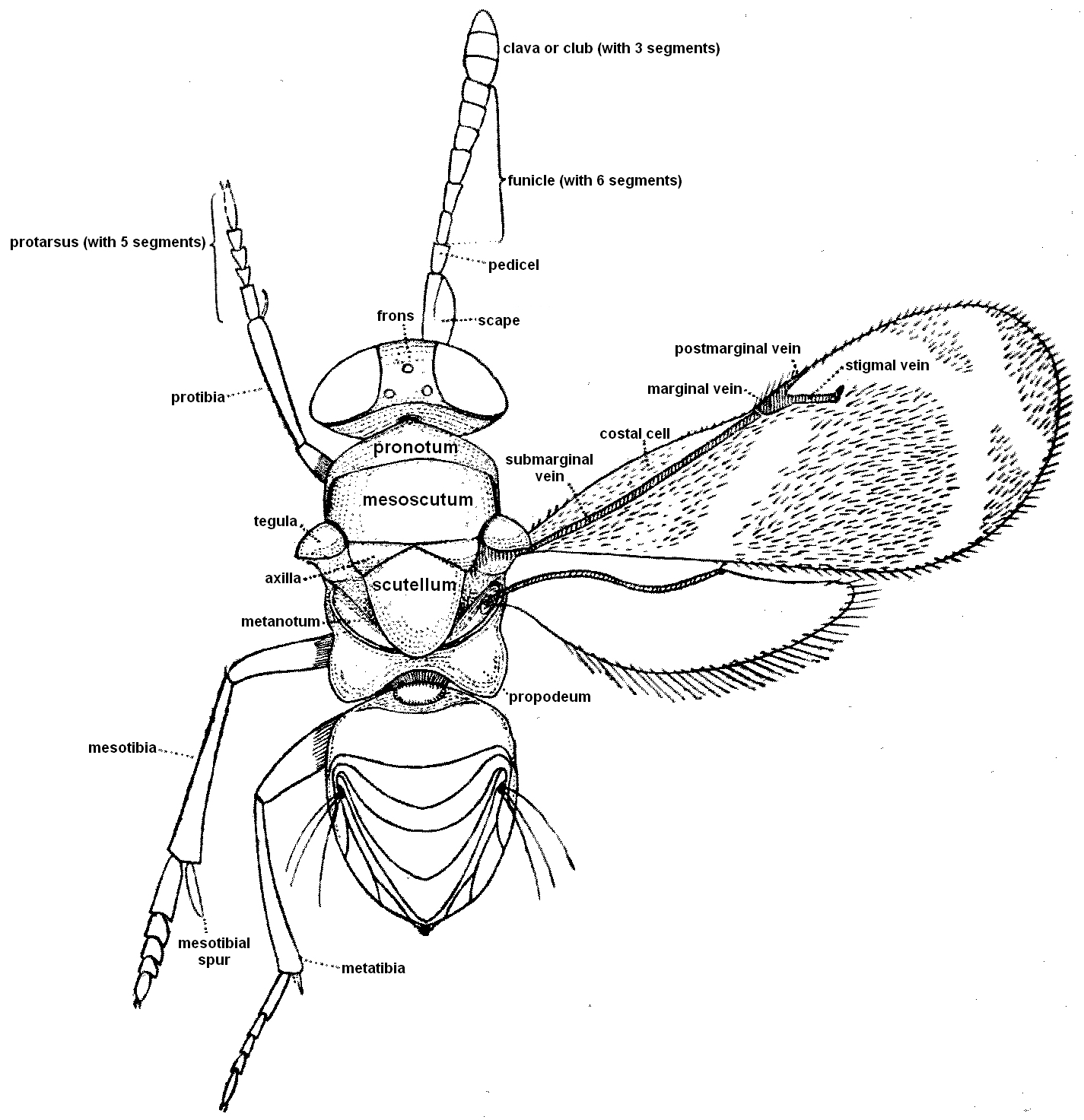
Body parts of a parasitic wasp (Encyrtidae, Chalcidoidea)

== Head ==
Most chalcidoid wasps have a pair of compound eyes (composed of many ommatidia), an anterior (or median) ocellus, and two posterior ocelli; the ocelli form a triangle between the eyes.

The face is the surface of the head between the inner margins of the eyes, below the anterior ocellus, and above the clypeus; the clypeus is the median (middle) region above the mouthparts, sometimes bounded by a suture between two anterior tentorial pits, and vertical sutures between each pit and the mouth. At the base of each antenna is an opening in the head capsule, around this opening is a ring-like structure called the torulus. The ventral (lower) margins of the toruli marks the lowest extent of the frons or upper face. The supraclypeal area is the median part of the face between the frons and the clypeus. The depression above each torulus is termed the scrobe; the scrobes usually converge into a scrobal depression. The interantennal area between the scrobes may form a ridge or lobe called the interantennal prominence or crest. The area between the scrobe and the eye is called the parascrobal area; a preorbital carina may form lines or grooves parallel to the inner margin of the eye.

On top of the head, the vertex is the area between the eyes and behind the front (anterior) ocellus, the temples are the upper parts of the head behind each eye, and the genae (singular gena) denote the portions of the head that are below and behind the lowest part of each eye (visible from the side). The frontovertex includes the vertex and the face above the scrobes. A malar sulcus (or genal sulcus) typically separates the lower face from the gena. The posterior part of the gena may have a genal carina from the rear corner of the mouth extending upwards behind the eye. However, the genal carina is not continuous across the top of the posterior part of the head. The occipital carina, on the other hand, does extend across the top of the head behind the posterior ocelli.

=== Antenna ===
The antenna consists of a scape, a pedicel and a flagellum. At the base of the scape where the antenna is attached to the head, the constricted portion of the scape is called the radicle; this is usually short relative to the length of the scape, but can be quite long in some species. The segments of the flagellum are termed flagellomeres. The basal segment or segments may be very short or ring-like; these are termed anelli (singular anellus). At the end of the flagellum, there may be a clava (or club) composed of one to four larger segments; between the anelli and the club the funicle has one or more funicular segments. Males of some species have funicular segments that are lobed or ramose (branched). The antennae of chalcidoid wasps have as few as three flagellomeres making up the funicle and club (Eretmocerus), and as many as 22 (as in some Eucharissa species). The scape and pedicel generally comprise a single segment each. The antennal formula is used to describe the number of segments in each of the components of the antenna (scape; pedicel; anelli, funicle; clava). An antennal formula of 1:1:2:4:3 indicates an antenna with a scape, a pedicel, 2 anelli, 4 funicular segments, and 3 segments in the clava (or club).

== Mesosoma ==
As in other Apocrita, the thorax is fused to the first abdominal segment (propodeum) to form the mesosoma. In dorsal view (from above), starting at the head, the pronotum, mesoscutum, axillae, and scutellum are generally visible, but when the wings are folded over the body, the metanotum and propodeum are often obscured. The lateral lobes of the mesoscutum may be separated from the midlobe of the mesoscutum by notauli. The tegula covers the base of the wing. The posterior of the mesoscutum is separated from the scutellum and the axillae by the transscutal articulation, and scutoscutellar sutures define the axillae from the scutellum. Behind the scutellum, the metanotum is the posterior sclerite of the thorax; this is broadly fused to the propodeum which is the first (anterior) abdominal sclerite and posterior sclerite of the mesosoma. The propodeal spiracles are situated at a sublateral position on the propodeum.

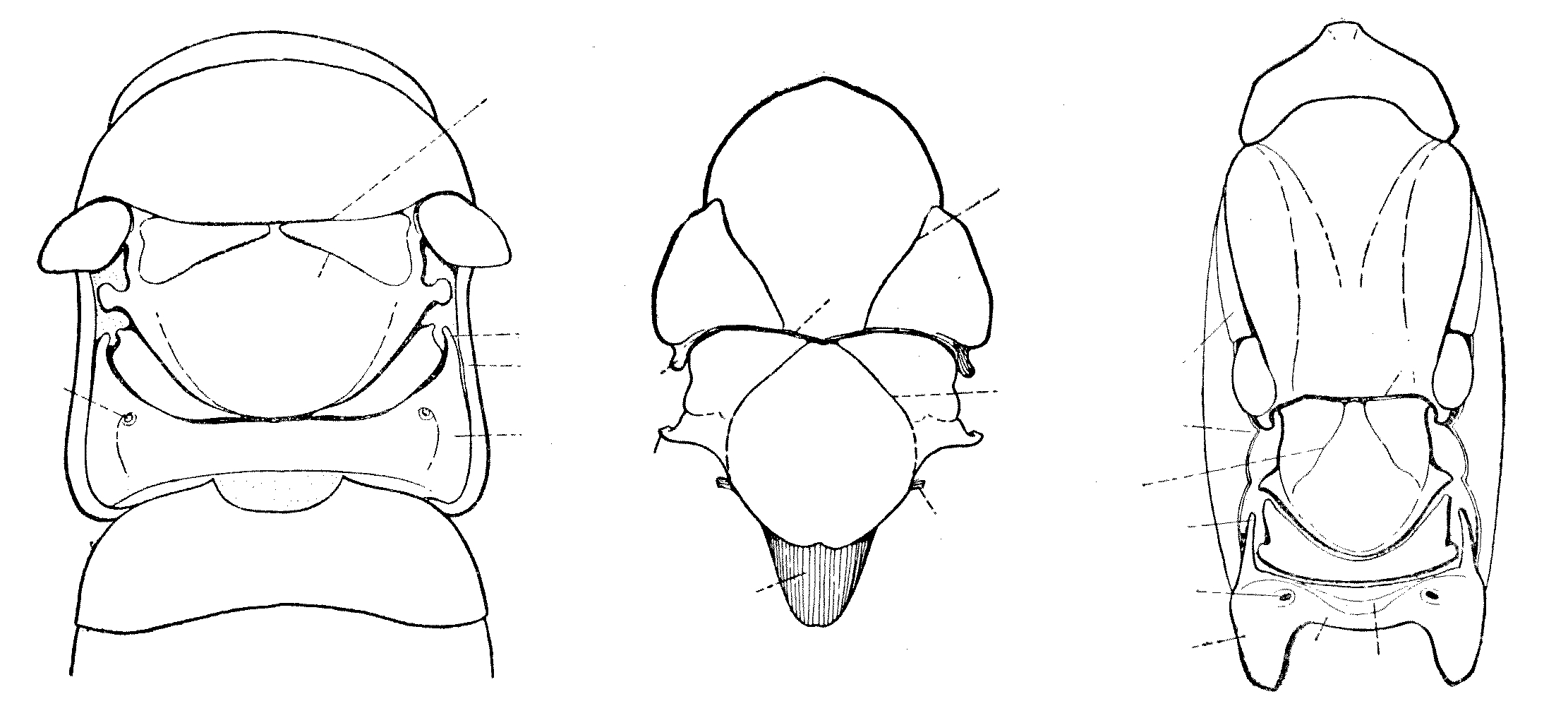
Chalcidoid mesosomas (dorsal view): Left - Microterys sp. (Encyrtidae); Centre - Eurytoma diastrophi (Eurytomidae); Right - Eupelmus pulchriceps (Eupelmidae).

In lateral view, the propleuron is situated below the pronotum; the coxa of the front leg is connected to the mesosoma at the posterior end of the propleuron. The subtriangular prepectus is the sclerite that is located on the intersegmental membrane between the pronotum and the mesopleuron. It is not always obvious, but generally separates the pronotum from the tegula. The mesothoracic spiracle (or prothoracic spiracle) is usually situated at or near the juncture of the mesoscutum, the pronotum, and the prepectus.

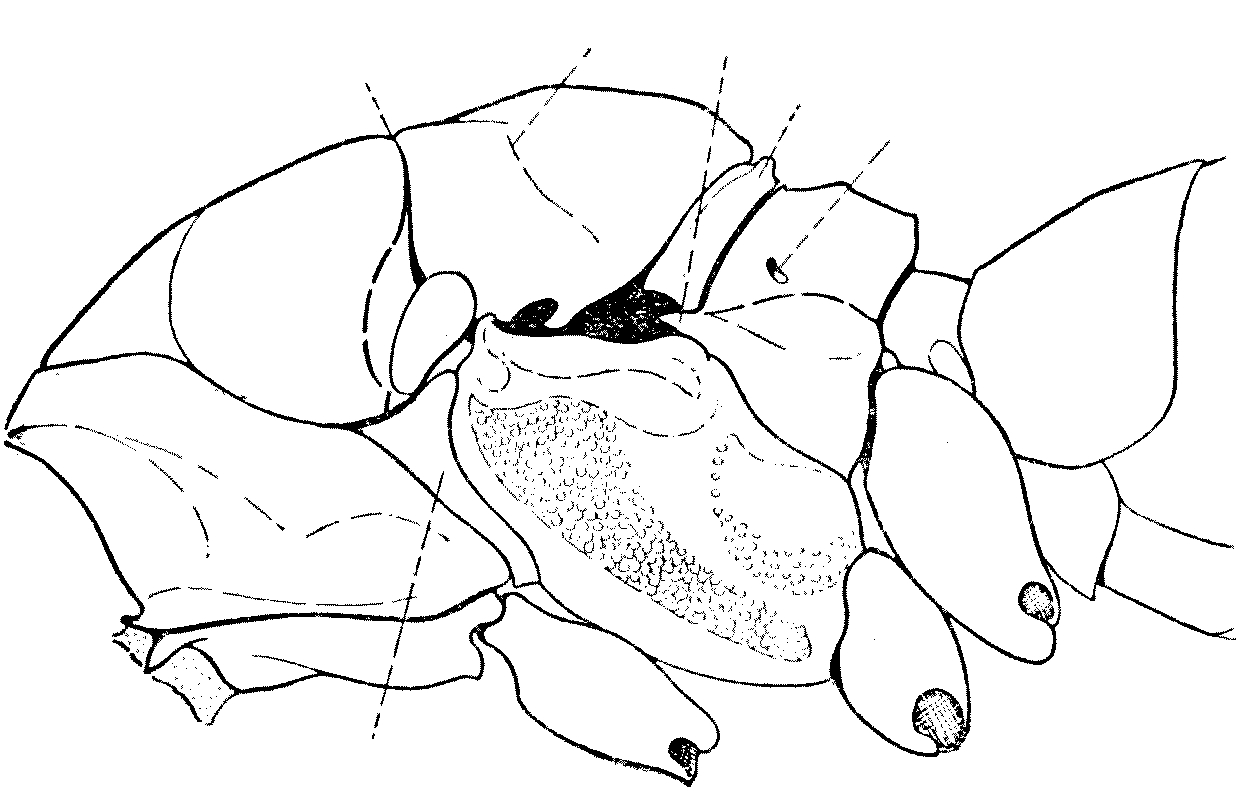
Mesosoma of Eurydinoteloides incertus (Pteromalidae)

=== Wings ===
Many species in this group have males (or both males and females) that are apterous (wingless), or brachypterous (very small wings). However, even fully winged Chalcidoid wasps have reduced wing venation when compared to larger wasps that are more frequently observed (e.g. Aculeata, Ichneumonoidea and Symphyta). At most, the forewing venation comprises a simple arrangement of a submarginal vein, a marginal vein, a stigmal vein and a postmarginal vein. The relative length of these veins is often used as a guide to family or subfamily.

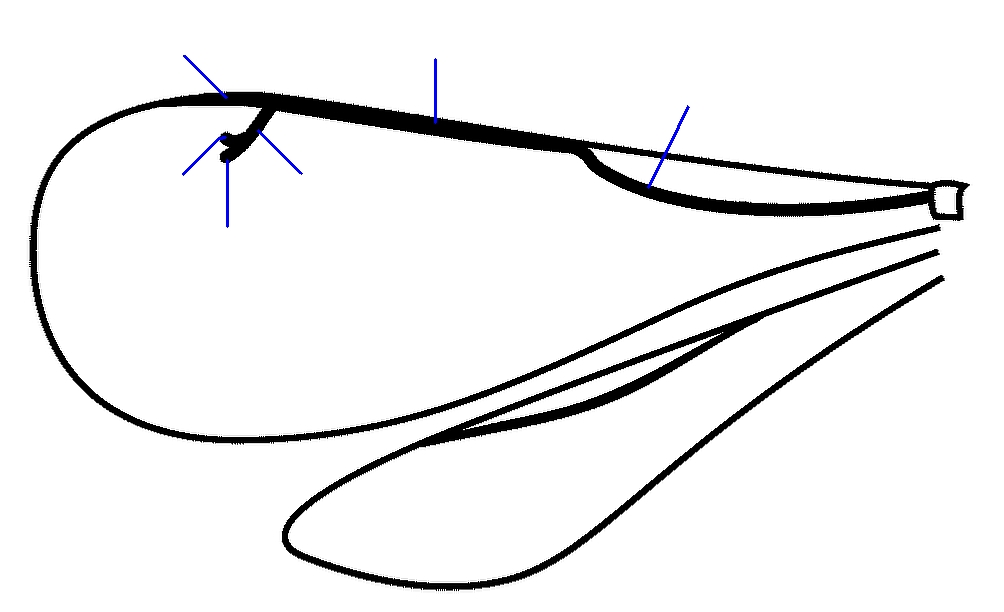
Chalcidoid wing veins

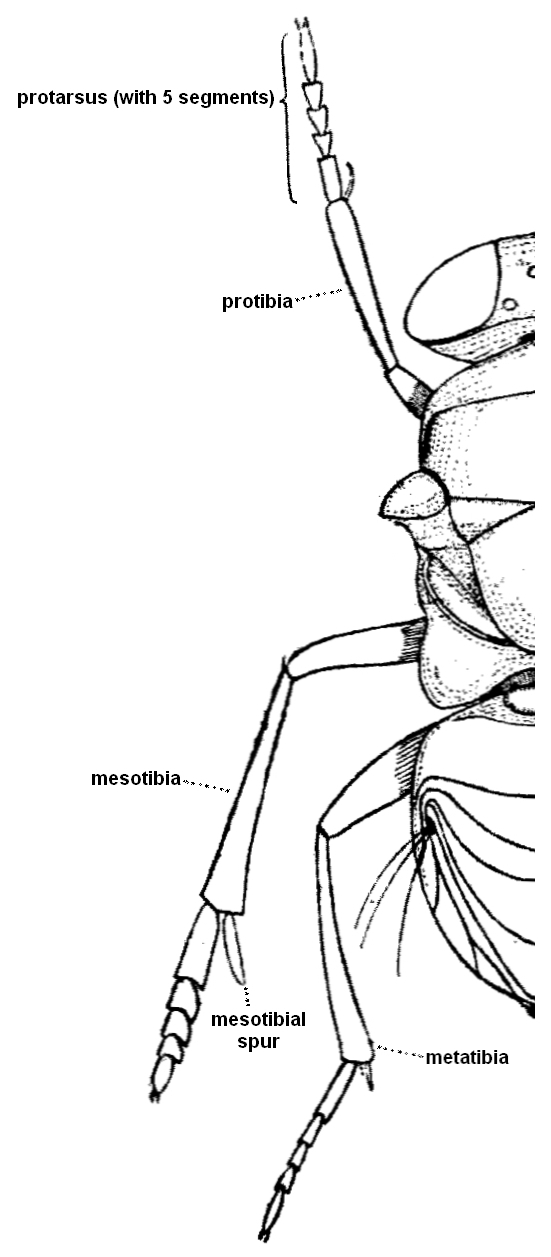
Chalcidoid legs

=== Legs ===
Each leg has six segments: coxa, trochanter, femur, tibia, tarsus, and pretarsus. Typically, each tarsus is subdivided into three to five tarsal segments. The basal segment (closest to the body) is the basitarsus, and the terminal pretarsus has a pair of tarsal claws. The protibia and mesotibia each possess a tibial spur, whereas the metatibia may contain one or two spurs. The protibial spur is generally short and linear if there are three or four tarsal segments and it is usually relatively robust, curved, and forked (or bifurcate) when there are five tarsal segments. The protibial spur (or calcar) and basitarsus are used together to clean the antennae.

== Metasoma ==
The metasoma is composed of the petiole, the initial metasomal tergum, in addition to seven or eight postpetiolar segments (terga) that collectively form the gaster (Mt2 to Mt8 or Mt9). Many chalcidoids have a very short, broad petiole, such that the mesosoma and metasoma are broadly interconnected (sessile), and the petiole may be obscured from view. Conversely, the petiole may be tubular and longer than broad, so that a distinct constriction demarcates the mesosoma from the metasoma, and the metasoma is 'petiolate'. There is a pair of functional spiracles on the seventh metasomal tergum (Mt7). Most chalcidoids also have a pair of sensory cerci, typically situated on Mt8. The cerci may be setose, finger-like projections or as low plate-like structures that bear several prominent setae (cercal bristles).The metasomal spiracles are consistently located on Mt7 when present; they can be valuable pointers for ascertaining the number of terga.

Ventrally (on the 'underside' of the metasoma), male specimens possess seven discernible sterna, whereas female specimens typically exhibit five visible sterna. The terminal sternum is referred to as the hypopygium, which is generally the most substantial sternum and may sometimes extend posteriorly into a spine-like mucro. In contrast to males, the sterna of females may be confined to the basal segment of the metasoma, in which instances the ovipositor is visible from below. The ovipositor comprises the protective outer ovipositor sheaths flanking the median stylets, which perform the actual drilling function. The ovipositor is characterized as 'exserted' when it protrudes beyond the apex of the metasoma.

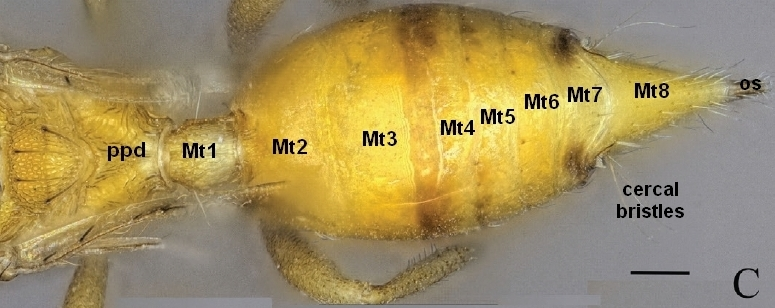
Metasoma of Dipara kakamegensis (Diparidae): ppd, propodeum; Mt1, mesosomal tergite 1 (petiole); Mt2-Mt8, mesosomal tergites 2-8; os, ovipositor sheath; Scale bar: 100 μm
