= Alophomorphella illustris =

Scientific classification
- Kingdom: Animalia
- Phylum: Arthropoda
- Clade: Pancrustacea
- Class: Insecta
- Order: Hymenoptera
- Family: Eulophidae
- Genus: Alophomorphella
- Species: A. illustris

Binomial name
- Alophomorphella illustris Girault, 1913

Species of insect

Alophomorphella illustris is a species of insect from the Eulophidae family. It was described by Girault in 1913. It is the type species of the Alophomorphella genus.

== Etymology ==
The species' name comes from the Latin root illustris, meaning bright or shining. This refers to the shiny frontovertex of the species.

== Distribution ==
The species is found in Australia (Queensland), Taiwan (Guanxi), China (Gansu, Hainan), and Indonesia (Java, Kalimantan).
