= Aroplectrus contheylae =

Scientific classification
- Kingdom: Animalia
- Phylum: Arthropoda
- Clade: Pancrustacea
- Class: Insecta
- Order: Hymenoptera
- Family: Eulophidae
- Genus: Aroplectrus
- Species: A. contheylae

Binomial name
- Aroplectrus contheylae Narendran, 2002

Species of insect

Aroplectrus contheylae is a species of chalcid wasp in the family Eulophidae. It was described by Narendran in 2002. Females have a body length of 3.84 mm, whereas males are 2.39 mm. The species is found in Kerala, India.

== Etymology ==
The insect is named after its Lepidopteran host, Contheyla rotunda.
