= Anumanniola lasallei =

Scientific classification
- Kingdom: Animalia
- Phylum: Arthropoda
- Clade: Pancrustacea
- Class: Insecta
- Order: Hymenoptera
- Family: Eulophidae
- Genus: Anumanniola
- Species: A. lasallei

Binomial name
- Anumanniola lasallei Narendran, 2003

Species of insect

Anumanniola lasallei is a species of insect from the Eulophidae family. It was described by T. C. Narendran in 2003, and is the type species of its genus. It has a body length of 0.69 mm, and a metallic green refringence.

== Etymology ==
It is named after Dr. John Lasalle, who was an Australian insect taxonomist.

== Distribution ==
The species has been found in Karnataka and Orissa of India, and Kandy, Sri Lanka.
