= Alophomorphella viola =

Scientific classification
- Kingdom: Animalia
- Phylum: Arthropoda
- Clade: Pancrustacea
- Class: Insecta
- Order: Hymenoptera
- Family: Eulophidae
- Genus: Alophomorphella
- Species: A. viola

Binomial name
- Alophomorphella viola Narendran, 2011

Species of insect

Alophomorphella viola is a species of insect from the Eulophidae family. It was described by Narendran in 2011. It is found in Kerala in India.

== Etymology ==
The species gains its name from body coloration, which is described as having a "deep violet refringence."
