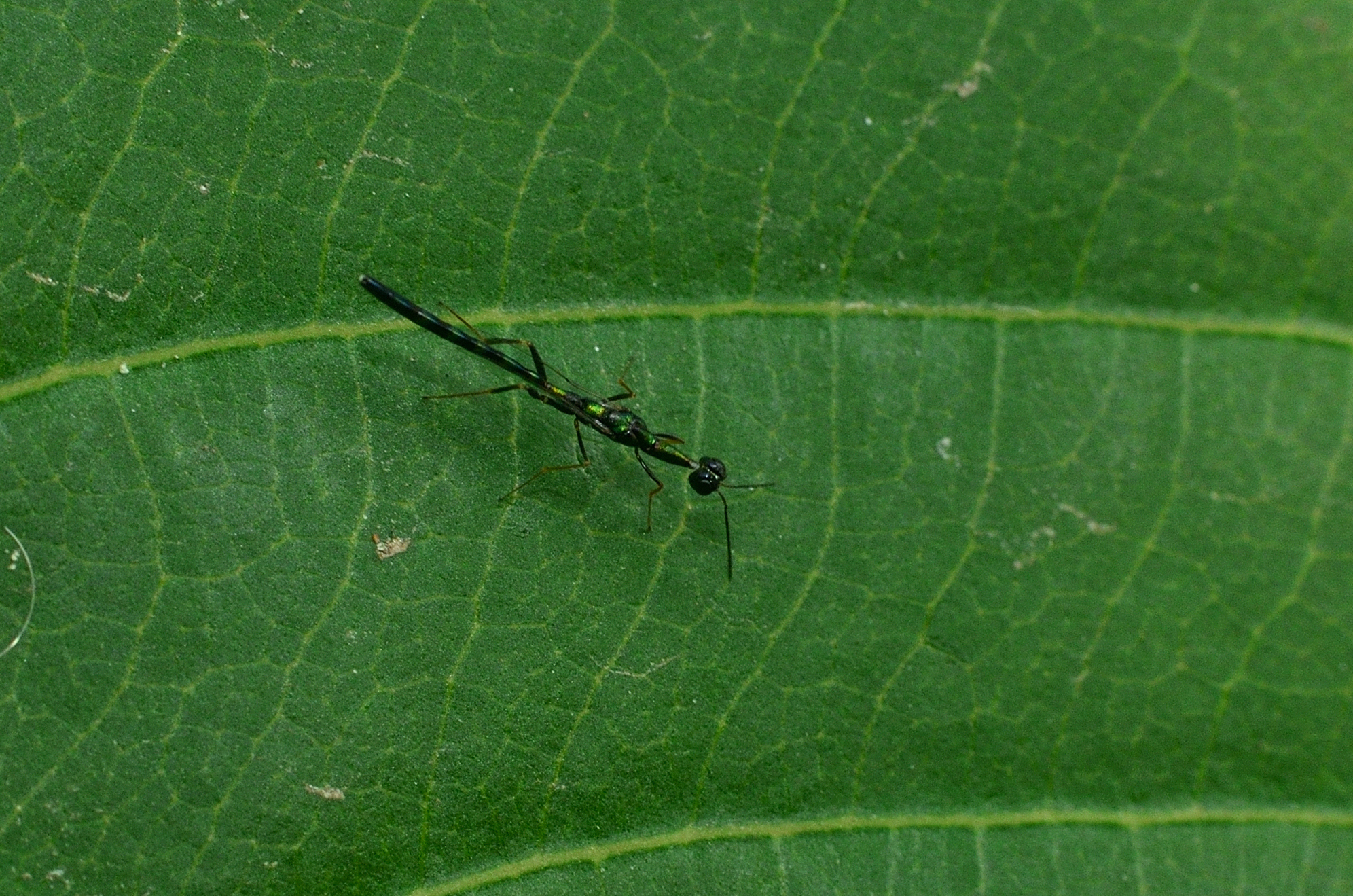
- male
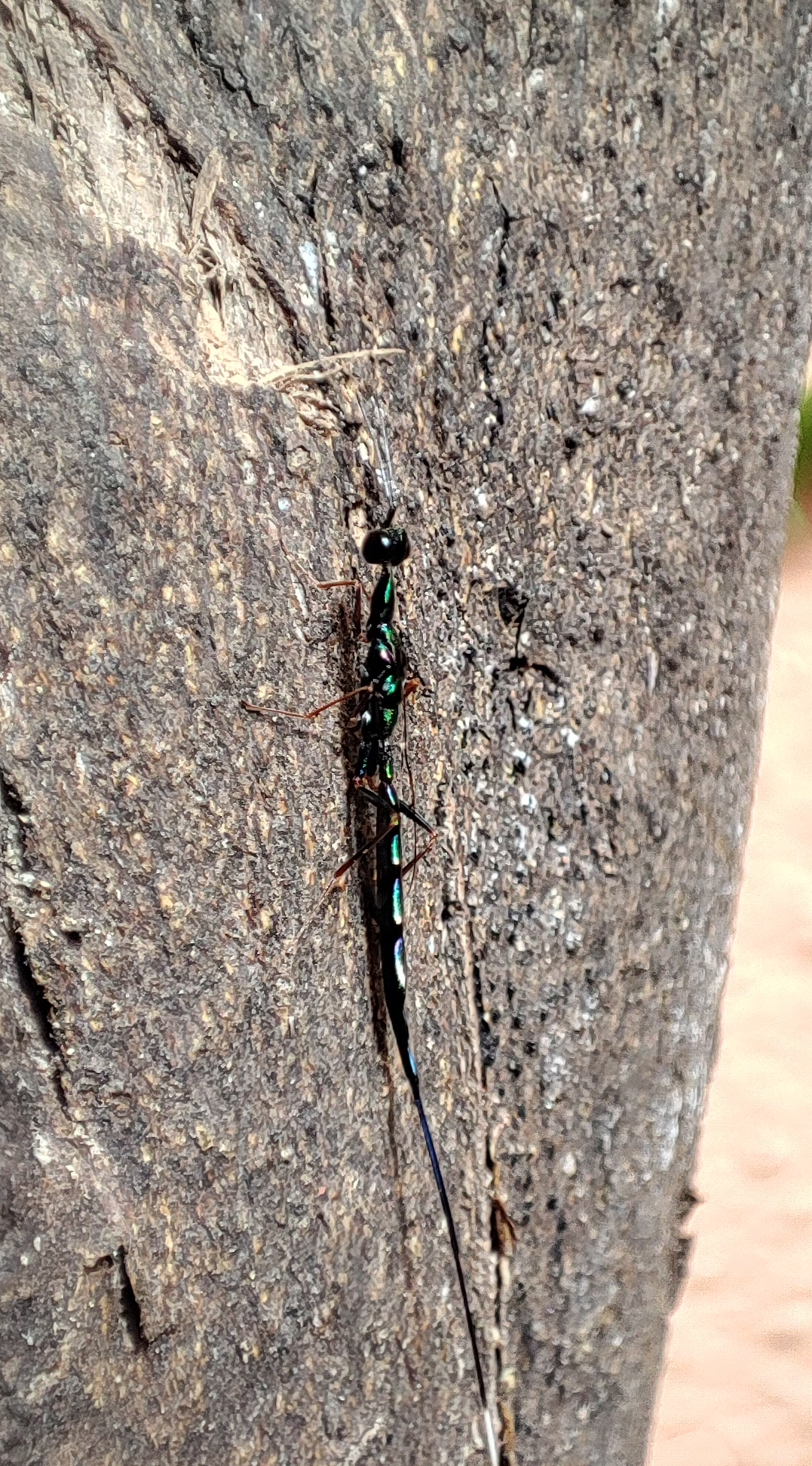
- female

Scientific classification
- Domain: Eukaryota
- Kingdom: Animalia
- Phylum: Arthropoda
- Class: Insecta
- Order: Hymenoptera
- Family: Pelecinellidae
- Genus: Doddifoenus
- Species: D. burksi

Binomial name
- Doddifoenus burksi Gupta et al., 2022

= Doddifoenus burksi =

Species of wasp

Doddifoenus burksi is a species of wasp found in India. It was named after Roger A. Burks, an entomologist. It was first observed and described from Belur in Karnataka. A pair of them were observed mating and later parasitizing a longhorn beetle larva.
