= Aroplectrus noyesi =

Scientific classification
- Kingdom: Animalia
- Phylum: Arthropoda
- Clade: Pancrustacea
- Class: Insecta
- Order: Hymenoptera
- Family: Eulophidae
- Genus: Aroplectrus
- Species: A. noyesi

Binomial name
- Aroplectrus noyesi Narendran, 2011

Species of insect

Aroplectrus noyesi is a species of chalcid wasp in the family Eulophidae. It was described by T. C. Narendran in 2011, It is found in Thailand, and hosts on stinging nettle caterpillar larvae.

== Etymology ==
Aroplectrus noyesi is named after John S. Noyes, a Welsh entomologist who specialized in Hymenopteran species.
