= Anumanniola narendrani =

Scientific classification
- Kingdom: Animalia
- Phylum: Arthropoda
- Clade: Pancrustacea
- Class: Insecta
- Order: Hymenoptera
- Family: Eulophidae
- Genus: Anumanniola
- Species: A. narendrani

Binomial name
- Anumanniola narendrani Jamali, Zeya & Fatima, 2003

Species of insect

Anumanniola narendrani is a species of insect from the Eulophidae family. It was described in 2017 by Jamali, Zeya, & Fatima. It is found in India.

== Etymology ==
The species was named after T. C. Narendran, an Indian taxonomist who described the Anumanniola genus in 2003.
