= Alophomorphella =

Scientific classification
- Kingdom: Animalia
- Phylum: Arthropoda
- Clade: Pancrustacea
- Class: Insecta
- Order: Hymenoptera
- Family: Eulophidae
- Subfamily: Eulophinae
- Genus: Alophomorphella; Girault, 1913

Type species
- Alophomorphella illustris Girault, 1913

Species
- Alophomorphella bharathica Narendran, 2011; Alophomorphella boneia Ubaidillah, 2006; Alophomorphella illustris Girault, 1913; Alophomorphella infaceta Ubaidillah, 2006; Alophomorphella marosia Ubaidillah, 2006; Alophomorphella viola Narendran, 2011

Genus of wasps

Alophomorphella is a genus of hymenopteran insects of the family Eulophidae. Species of the genus are found in southeast Asia and northeast Australia. It is notable for having a deep pit on its scutellum. Species range from 2.1-2.6 mm.

== Etymology ==
The name Alophomorphella is a combination of the Greek roots, a-, -lophos, -morph, and ellus. These respectively translate to "without," "crest," "form," "small," referring to the microscopic size of the genus, and its lack of a cross carina (crest.)

== Distribution ==
The genus has been found in India, Australia (Queensland), Indonesia (Halmahera, Sulawesi, Kalimantan, Java), China, and Papua New Guinea.
