= Alophomorphella bharathica =

Scientific classification
- Kingdom: Animalia
- Phylum: Arthropoda
- Clade: Pancrustacea
- Class: Insecta
- Order: Hymenoptera
- Family: Eulophidae
- Genus: Alophomorphella
- Species: A. bharathica

Binomial name
- Alophomorphella bharathica Narendran, 2011

Species of insect

Alophomorphella bharathica is a species of insect from the Eulophidae family. It was described by Narendran in 2011. The species is found in Kerala and Odisha of India. It tends to use cardamom plants and cardamom pests as its hosts.

== Etymology ==
The species is named after Bharat, an alternative name for India, the country which this species is exclusive to.
