= List of Ormyrus species =

This is a list of 132 species in Ormyrus, a genus of chalcid wasps in the family Ormyridae.

== Ormyrus species ==
- Ormyrus absonus Narendran, 1999^{c g}
- Ormyrus acylus Hanson, 1992^{c g}
- Ormyrus aeros Narendran, 1999^{c g}
- Ormyrus alus Narendran, 1999^{c g}
- Ormyrus ardahanensis (Doganlar, 1991)^{c g}
- Ormyrus aridus Zerova, 2005^{c g}
- Ormyrus asiaticus Narendran, 1999^{c g}
- Ormyrus australiensis Girault, 1915^{c g}
- Ormyrus australis Risbec, 1957^{c g}
- Ormyrus badius De Stefani, 1898^{c g}
- Ormyrus bellbowl Nastasi, Alcorn, & Davis, 2025^{z}
- Ormyrus benazeer Narendran, 1999^{c g}
- Ormyrus benjaminae Narendran, 1999^{c g}
- Ormyrus bicarinatus Girault, 1915^{c g}
- Ormyrus bicolor Zerova, 2006^{c g}
- Ormyrus bicoloripes Girault, 1915^{c g}
- Ormyrus bingoeliensis Doganlar, 1991^{c g}
- Ormyrus borneanus Narendran, 1999^{c g}
- Ormyrus bouceki Narendran, 1999^{c g}
- Ormyrus brasiliensis Ashmead, 1904^{c g}
- Ormyrus bucharicus Zerova, 1985^{c g}
- Ormyrus burwelli Narendran, 1999^{c g}
- Ormyrus caeruleus Walker, 1850^{c g}
- Ormyrus calycopteridis Narendran, 1999^{c g}
- Ormyrus capsalis Askew, 1994^{c g}
- Ormyrus carinativentris Girault, 1915^{c g}
- Ormyrus chalybeus (Ratzeburg, 1844)^{c g}
- Ormyrus chevalieri (Risbec, 1955)^{c g}
- Ormyrus cingulatus (Forster, 1860)^{g}
- Ormyrus classeyi Narendran, 1999^{c g}
- Ormyrus cosmozonus Forster, 1860^{g}
- Ormyrus crassus Hanson, 1992^{c g}
- Ormyrus cubitalis Narendran, 1999^{c g}
- Ormyrus cupreus Askew, 1998^{c g}
- Ormyrus curiosus Narendran, 1999^{c g}
- Ormyrus dahmsi Narendran, 1999^{c g}
- Ormyrus desertus Zerova & Dawah, 2003^{c g}
- Ormyrus destefanii Mayr, 1904^{c g}
- Ormyrus diffinis (Fonscolombe, 1832)^{c g}
- Ormyrus discolor Zerova, 2005^{c g}
- Ormyrus distinctus Fullaway, 1912^{c g}
- Ormyrus diversus Narendran, 1999^{c g}
- Ormyrus dryorhizoxeni Ashmead, 1885^{c g}
- Ormyrus ermolenkoi Zerova, 2006^{c g}
- Ormyrus eugeniae Risbec, 1955^{c g}
- Ormyrus ferus Narendran, 1999^{c g}
- Ormyrus fernandinus Nieves-Aldrey, Hernández & Gómez, 2007
- Ormyrus flavipes Boucek, 1981^{c g}
- Ormyrus flavitibialis Yasumatsu & Kamijo, 1979^{c g}
- Ormyrus gopii Narendran, 1999^{c g}
- Ormyrus gratiosus (Forster, 1860)^{g}
- Ormyrus halimodendri Zerova, 1985^{c g}
- Ormyrus hansoni Narendran, 1999^{c g}
- Ormyrus harithus Narendran, 1999^{c g}
- Ormyrus hebridensis Narendran, 1999^{c g}
- Ormyrus hegeli (Girault, 1917)^{c g}
- Ormyrus hongkongensis Narendran, 1999^{c g}
- Ormyrus ibaraki Zerova, 2006^{c g}
- Ormyrus ignotus Narendran, 1999^{c g}
- Ormyrus kalabak Narendran, 1999^{c g}
- Ormyrus kama Narendran, 1999^{c g}
- Ormyrus kamijoi Narendran, 1999^{c g}
- Ormyrus keralensis Narendran & Abdurahiman, 1990^{c g}
- Ormyrus labotus Walker, 1843^{c g}
- Ormyrus laccatus Zerova, 1985^{c g}
- Ormyrus lanatus Zerova, 1985^{c g}
- Ormyrus langlandi Girault, 1920^{c g}
- Ormyrus laosensis Narendran, 1999^{c g}
- Ormyrus lepidus Narendran, 1999^{c g}
- Ormyrus lini Chen, 1999^{c g}
- Ormyrus longicaudus Narendran, 1999^{c g}
- Ormyrus longicornis Boucek, 1969^{c g}
- Ormyrus maai Narendran, 1999^{c g}
- Ormyrus macaoensis Narendran, 1999^{c g}
- Ormyrus malabaricus Narendran, 1999^{c g}
- Ormyrus mareebensis Narendran, 2001^{c g}
- Ormyrus monegricus Askew, 1994^{c g}
- Ormyrus myrae Nastasi, Alcorn, & Davis, 2025^{z}
- Ormyrus negriensis Narendran, 1999^{c g}
- Ormyrus nishidai Narendran, 1999^{c g}
- Ormyrus nitidulus (Fabricius, 1804)^{c g}
- Ormyrus nkoloensis Rasplus^{g}
- Ormyrus novus Zerova, 2012
- Ormyrus noyesi Narendran, 1999^{c g}
- Ormyrus orientalis Walker, 1871^{c g}
- Ormyrus orupol Narendran, 1999^{c g}
- Ormyrus pallens Lotfalizadeh & Askew^{g}
- Ormyrus papaveris (Perris, 1840)^{c g}
- Ormyrus papuanicus Narendran, 1999^{c g}
- Ormyrus parvulus Zerova, 1985^{c g}
- Ormyrus philippinensis Hedqvist, 1968^{c g}
- Ormyrus pomaceus (Geoffroy, 1785)^{c g}
- Ormyrus punctellus Zerova, 2012
- Ormyrus punctulatus (Forster, 1860)^{g}
- Ormyrus qurrayahi Zerova, 2012
- Ormyrus reticulatus Hanson, 1992^{c g}
- Ormyrus retusae Narendran, 1999^{c g}
- Ormyrus rosae Ashmead, 1885^{c g}
- Ormyrus rufimanus Mayr, 1904^{c g}
- Ormyrus salmanticus Nieves-Aldrey, 1984^{c g}
- Ormyrus sculptilis Crosby, 1909^{c g}
- Ormyrus secus Narendran, 1999^{c g}
- Ormyrus sedlaceki Narendran, 1999^{c g}
- Ormyrus setosus Hanson, 1992^{c g}
- Ormyrus sheelae Narendran, 1999^{c g}
- Ormyrus shonus Narendran, 1999^{c g}
- Ormyrus silvae Girault, 1925^{c g}
- Ormyrus similis Zerova, 1985^{c g}
- Ormyrus solitarius (Olivier, 1791)^{g}
- Ormyrus speculifer Erdos, 1946^{g}
- Ormyrus stom Narendran, 1999^{c g}
- Ormyrus striatus Cameron, 1907^{c g}
- Ormyrus subconicus Boucek, 1981^{c g}
- Ormyrus sydneyensis Narendran, 1999^{c g}
- Ormyrus tanus Narendran, 1999^{c g}
- Ormyrus tenompokus Narendran, 1999^{c g}
- Ormyrus tenuis Hanson, 1992^{c g}
- Ormyrus thymus Girault, 1917^{c g}
- Ormyrus tschami (Doganlar, 1991)^{c g}
- Ormyrus turio Hanson, 1992^{c g}
- Ormyrus unfasciatipennis Girault, 1917^{c g}
- Ormyrus unimaculatipennis Girault, 1916^{c g}
- Ormyrus vacciniicola Ashmead, 1887^{c g b}
- Ormyrus venustus Hanson, 1992^{c g b}
- Ormyrus versicolor Forster, 1860^{g}
- Ormyrus violaceus Forster, 1860^{g}
- Ormyrus wachtli Mayr, 1904^{c g}
- Ormyrus watshami Boucek, 1981^{c g}
- Ormyrus williamsi Narendran, 1999^{c g}
- Ormyrus zamoorini Narendran, 1999^{c g}
- Ormyrus zandanus Narendran, 1999^{c g}
- Ormyrus zoae Zerova, 2005^{c g}

Data sources: i = ITIS, c = Catalogue of Life, g = GBIF, b = Bugguide.net z = Zootaxa
