= Lycisca =

Lycisca may refer to:

- Lycisca (wasp), a wasp genus in the family Lyciscidae
- Wolf-dog hybrid, a canid hybrid resulting from the mating of a wolf and a dog
- Valeria Messalina (c. 17/20 – 48), a Roman empress, the third wife of the Emperor Claudius
- Lycisca (Wolfet), one of the female dogs of the hunter Actaeon. Like the rest of the pack, she also devoured her master when he was transformed into a stag by Artemis, goddess of the hunt.
