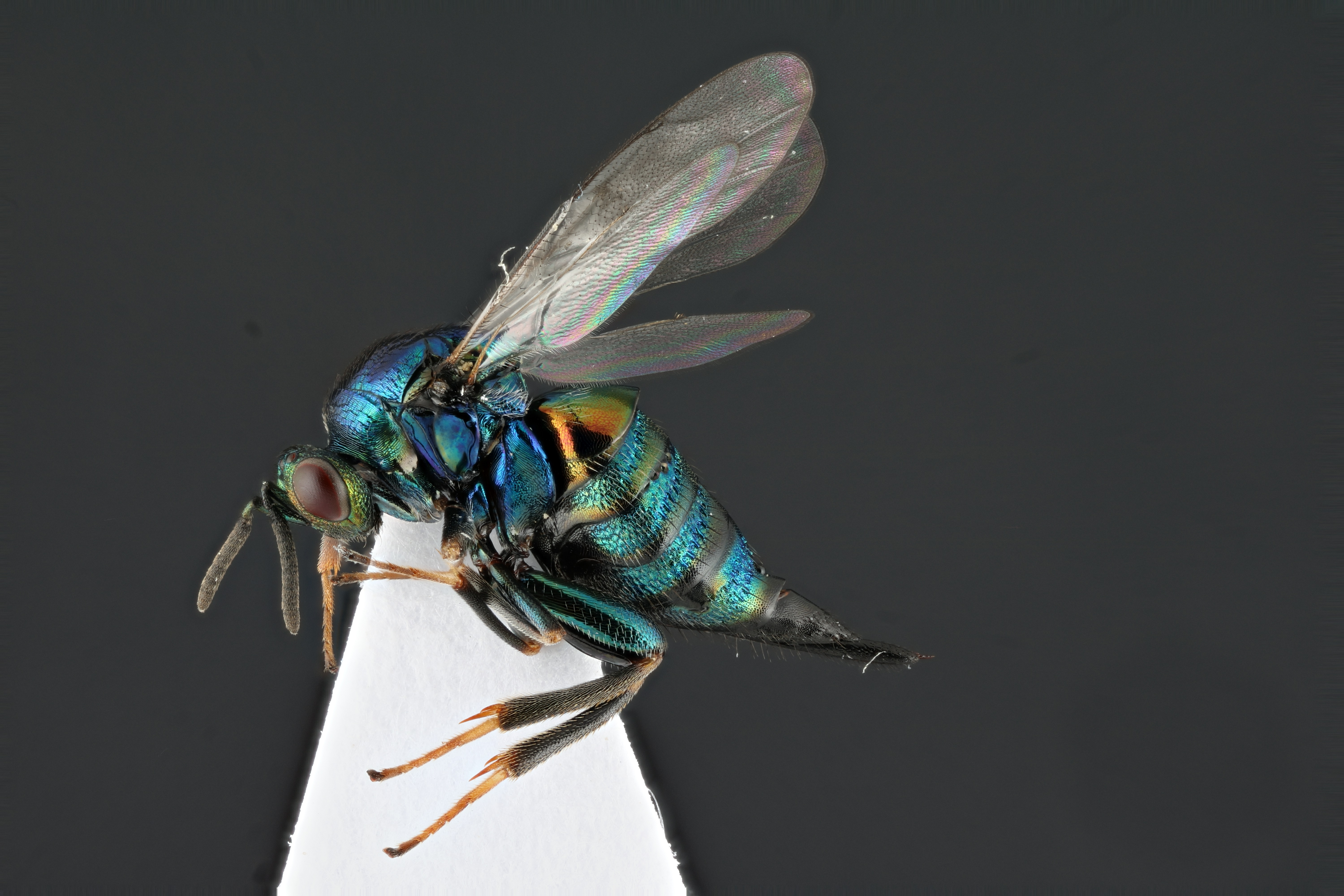

Scientific classification
- Kingdom: Animalia
- Phylum: Arthropoda
- Class: Insecta
- Order: Hymenoptera
- Family: Ormyridae
- Genus: Ormyrus
- Species: O. nitidulus

Binomial name
- Ormyrus nitidulus (Fabricius, 1804)

Synonyms
- Chalcis nitidula Fabricius, 1804; Cinips tubulosa Fonscolombe, 1832; Cleptes nitidulus (Fabricius, 1804); Ichneumon nitidulus Fabricius, 1793; Ormyrus chrysidiformis De Stefani, 1898; Ormyrus cyanosthetus (Walker, 1847); Ormyrus gallae-quercus (Dufour, 1864); Ormyrus nitidulans (Fabricius); Ormyrus schmidtii Schmidt, 1851; Ormyrus tubulosus (Fonscolombe, 1832); Siphonura cyanosthetus Walker, 1847; Siphonura gallae subsp. Quercus Dufour, 1864; Siphonura gallaequercus Dufour, 1864; Siphonura schmidtii Schmidt, 1851; Torymus chrysidiformis De Stefani, 1898

= Ormyrus nitidulus =

Species of insect

Ormyrus nitidulus is a species of parasitoid wasp in the family Ormyridae. It is primarily associated with oak gall wasps. Ormyrus nitidulus is a small metallic wasp with an approximate adult length of around 5mm. It has a fairly widespread distribution, being found across the Palaearctic.

== Distribution ==
Per the Universal Chalcidoidea Database, O. nitidulus is found across Western Palaearctic realm, from the north-west in the United Kingdom to Algeria in the south, and as far east as Iran.

== Biology ==
Ormyrus nitidulus larvae are idiobiont ectoparasitoids primarily associated with oak gall wasps, including but not limited to species in the genera Andricus, Cynips, and Biorhiza. The species is stated to be less polyphagous than the related Ormyrus pomaceus which utlizes a wider range of host oak gall wasps.

== Morphology and identification ==
Species in the genus Ormyrus are generally characterised by bright metallic colours, the coarsely crenulated sculpture of the metasoma, well-developed hind coxae, short stigmal veins and two stout and curved metatibial spurs.

O. nitidulus can be distinguished from the other oak gall wasp-parasitizing members of the genus in the palaearctic by its distinctly elongated epipygium, as opposed to the shorter epipygia in other Ormyrus species.
