= Anumanniola =

Scientific classification
- Kingdom: Animalia
- Phylum: Arthropoda
- Clade: Pancrustacea
- Class: Insecta
- Order: Hymenoptera
- Family: Eulophidae
- Subfamily: Eulophinae
- Genus: Anumanniola; Narendran, 2003

Type species
- Anumanniola lasallei Narendran, 2003

Species
- Anumanniola lasallei Narendran, 2003; Anumanniola narendrani Jamali, Zeya & Fatima, 2017

Genus of wasps

Anumanniola is an Indomalayan genus of Hymenopteran insects of the family Eulophidae. It was described by Narendran. Species are found in India and Sri Lanka.

== Etymology ==
The genus name is an anagram of another genus from Eulophidae, Naumanniola. This is due to similarities between the two genera (e.g. double-segmented clava.
