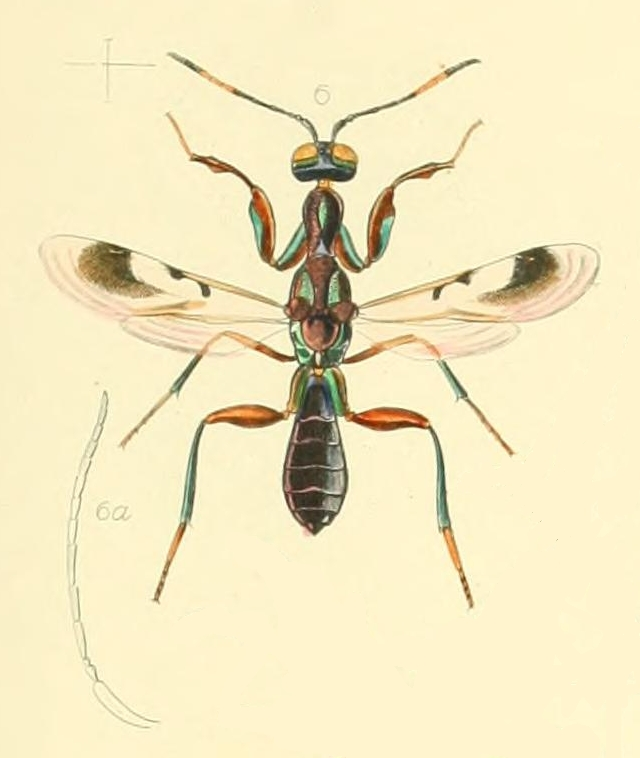
- Heydenia natalensis

Scientific classification
- Kingdom: Animalia
- Phylum: Arthropoda
- Clade: Pancrustacea
- Class: Insecta
- Order: Hymenoptera
- Superfamily: Chalcidoidea
- Family: Heydeniidae; Hedqvist, 1961

= Heydeniidae =

Family of wasps

Heydeniidae is a family of chalcidoid wasps. In 2022, this family was described based on an analysis of a combination of molecular, morphological, and life history data.

== Description ==
Small wasps; some species have a flattened, elongated pronotum, and expanded profemur. Their antennae have 10 or 11 flagellomeres, including three segments (clavomeres) in the club. The prepectus is ventrally elongated.

== Taxonomy ==
Heydeniidae contains the following genera:

- Heydenia
- Heydeniopsis (extinct)
