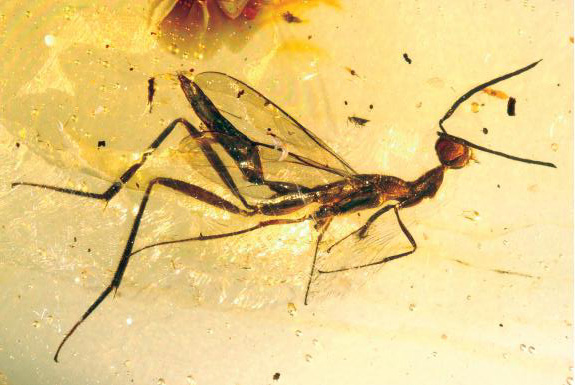
- Holotype of Leptofoenus pittfieldae

Scientific classification
- Kingdom: Animalia
- Phylum: Arthropoda
- Class: Insecta
- Order: Hymenoptera
- Family: Pelecinellidae
- Genus: Leptofoenus
- Species: †L. pittfieldae

Binomial name
- †Leptofoenus pittfieldae Engel, 2009

= Leptofoenus pittfieldae =

Extinct species of wasp

Leptofoenus pittfieldae is an extinct species of wasp in the family Pteromalidae. It is known from early Miocene Burdigalian stage Dominican amber deposits on the island of Hispaniola. The species is known from a single 8.8-millimetre (0.35 in) male specimen excavated from the La Toca mine group northeast of Santiago de los Caballeros in 2008 and deposited in the Insect Fossil Collection at the University of Kansas Natural History Museum in Lawrence, Kansas, where it was studied and described by Dr. Michael S. Engel. The species name pittfieldae honors Ms. Morgan Pittfield, niece of the specimen donor.

L. pittfieldae is the only member of Leptofoenus in the fossil record. Despite the large quantities of amber examined from the Dominican Republic, no additional specimens of Leptofoenus pittfieldae have been found. This may indicate that L. pittfieldae was uncommon in the Miocene, much like the five living species in this genus are uncommon today. No living species of Leptofoenus are documented in the West Indies, but there might be a population living there that has remained undiscovered due to its rarity.

L. pittfieldae is placed within Leptofoenus because it has a striolate region on the side of the pronotum, a feature found in the living species. It is differentiated from modern members of the genus based on a number of characters. The 4.7 mm (0.19 in) long and 2.3 mm wide forewing has a thinly sclerotized area behind the "M+Cu" veins, along with a sclerotized spot at the junction of the basal and "M+Cu" veins. The antenna is composed of eleven segments, though the last segment shows a possible fusion line, leaving the possibility that the antennae are thirteen segments long. The metatibia of L. pittfieldae lacks the rasp-like structure found in modern species. Overall the body of the type specimen is a uniform dark brown.
