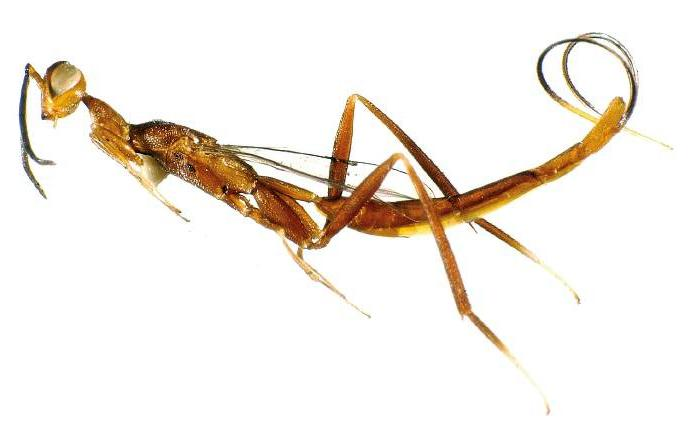
- Female of the species

Scientific classification
- Kingdom: Animalia
- Phylum: Arthropoda
- Clade: Pancrustacea
- Class: Insecta
- Order: Hymenoptera
- Family: Pelecinellidae
- Genus: Leptofoenus
- Species: L. rufus

Binomial name
- Leptofoenus rufus LaSalle & Stage, 1985

= Leptofoenus rufus =

Chalcidoid wasp species

Leptofoenus rufus is a species of chalcidoid wasp in the family Pelecinellidae.
