= Alophomorphella boneia =

Scientific classification
- Kingdom: Animalia
- Phylum: Arthropoda
- Clade: Pancrustacea
- Class: Insecta
- Order: Hymenoptera
- Family: Eulophidae
- Genus: Alophomorphella
- Species: A. boneia

Binomial name
- Alophomorphella boneia Ubaidillah, 2006

Species of insect

Alophomorphella boneia is a species of insect from the Eulophidae family. It was described by Ubaidillah in 2006. The species has only been found in North Sulawesi.

== Etymology ==
The wasp species' name refers to its type locality, the Dumoga Bone National Park, now known as Bogani Nani Wartabone National Park. This park is located in North Sulawesi.
