= Aroplectrus flavescens =

- Aroplectrus flavescens

Scientific classification
- Kingdom: Animalia
- Phylum: Arthropoda
- Clade: Pancrustacea
- Class: Insecta
- Order: Hymenoptera
- Family: Eulophidae
- Genus: Aroplectrus
- Species: A. flavescens

Binomial name
- Aroplectrus flavescens Crawford, 1915

Synonyms
- Euplectrus flavescens

Species of insect

Aroplectrus flavescens is a species of chalcid wasp in the family Eulophidae. It was described by James Chamberlain Crawford in 1915. It is distinguishable by the areolation (division into smaller compartments) of its propodeum.

== Etymology ==
The name flavescens refers to the species' yellow coloration, and is derived from the Latin root flavescense, defined as the property of having a yellow hue.

== Distribution ==
The species is found in Los Baños, Laguna of Luzon, an island of the Philippines.
