= Aroplectrus haplomerus =

Scientific classification
- Kingdom: Animalia
- Phylum: Arthropoda
- Clade: Pancrustacea
- Class: Insecta
- Order: Hymenoptera
- Family: Eulophidae
- Genus: Aroplectrus
- Species: A. haplomerus

Binomial name
- Aroplectrus haplomerus Lin, 1963

Species of insect

Aroplectrus haplomerus is a species of chalcid wasp in the family Eulophidae. It was described by K. S. Lin in 1963, and can be found in Taiwan. It possesses a red-colored body with yellow markings.

== Etymology ==
The name haplomerus is a combination of the Greek roots haplo- and meros, which mean "single" and "part" respectively.
