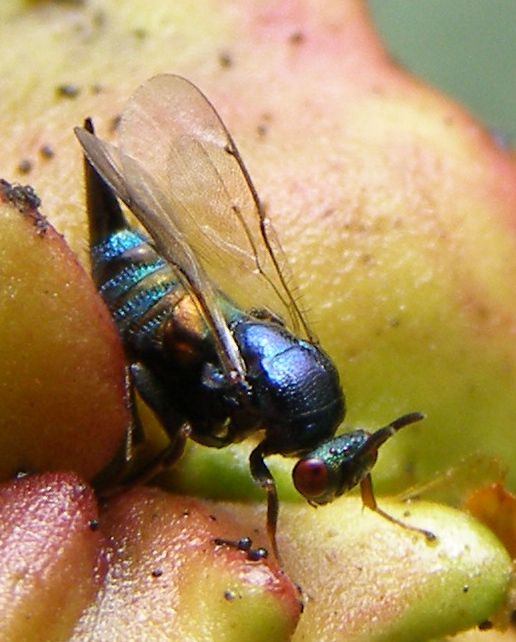

Scientific classification
- Kingdom: Animalia
- Phylum: Arthropoda
- Class: Insecta
- Order: Hymenoptera
- Family: Ormyridae
- Genus: Ormyrus; Westwood, 1832

= Ormyrus =

Genus of wasps

Ormyrus is a genus of chalcid wasps in the family Ormyridae. There are 145 described species in Ormyrus.

== Distribution ==
Ormyrus species are found across most of the Old World and North America.

== Description ==
These are small wasps, most with dark green or blue iridescence. Their antennae have one to three anelli, five to seven funiculars and four clavomeres (including a terminal button). The apical margin of the clypeus is bilobed, and they have a well developed occipital carina. There is no postgenal lamina and the postgenal bridge is closed. The metacoxa is greatly enlarged and subtriangular in cross section; the metatibia has two stout, curved spurs and the tarsal claws have large basal lamellar projections. The metasoma is strongly sclerotized and usually has transverse rows of large pits on the tergites.

== Biology ==
These wasps are parasitoids of a variety of gall formers, especially cynipid gall wasps and chalcid wasps, but also gall midges and tephritid fruit flies.

== See also ==
- List of Ormyrus species
