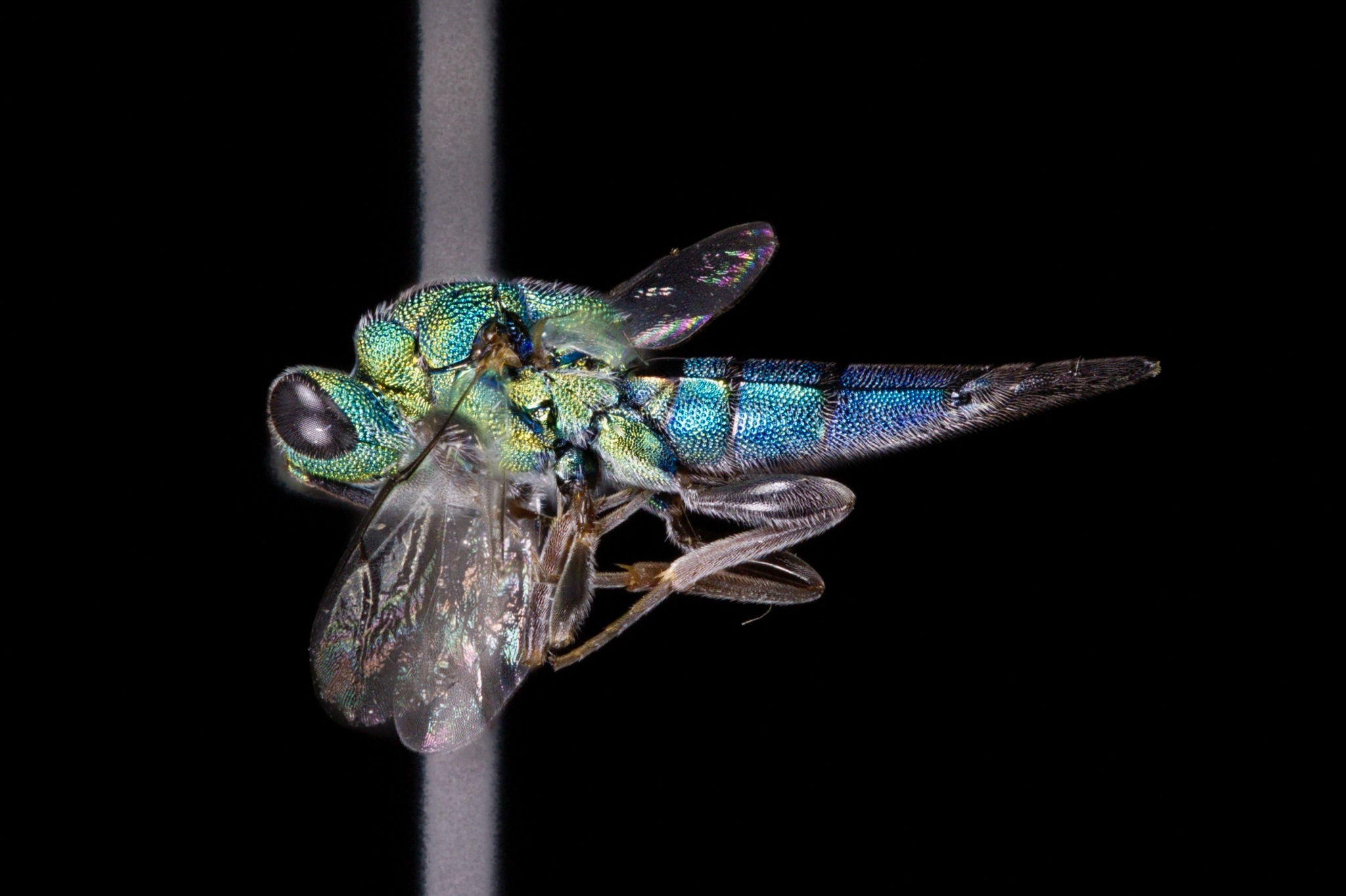
- Epistenia coeruleata

Scientific classification
- Kingdom: Animalia
- Phylum: Arthropoda
- Class: Insecta
- Order: Hymenoptera
- Family: Lyciscidae
- Subfamily: Lyciscinae
- Tribe: Lyciscini
- Genus: Epistenia; Westwood, 1832

Species
- See text.

Synonyms
- Dasyglenes Ashmead, 1888; Idiobia Brèthes, 1927; Idobia Gibson, 2003 (missp.)

= Epistenia =

Genus of wasps

Epistenia is a genus of wasps in the family Lyciscidae.

== Species ==
- Epistenia americana Girault
- Epistenia basalis Walker
- Epistenia bella Strand
- Epistenia burksi Hedqvist
- Epistenia cameroni Ozdikmen
- Epistenia chilensis Brèthes
- Epistenia coeruleata Westwood
- Epistenia conica Brèthes
- Epistenia cyanea (Fabricius)
- Epistenia gemmata Girault
- Epistenia goethei Girault
- Epistenia imperialis Smith
- Epistenia liguensis Brèthes
- Epistenia media Hedqvist
- Epistenia odyneri Ashmead
- Epistenia polita (Say)
- Epistenia regalis Cockerell
- Epistenia rufipes Cameron
- Epistenia schmidti (Brèthes)
- Epistenia scutellata Brèthes
- Epistenia westwoodi (Guérin-Méneville)
