= Alophomorphella infaceta =

Scientific classification
- Kingdom: Animalia
- Phylum: Arthropoda
- Clade: Pancrustacea
- Class: Insecta
- Order: Hymenoptera
- Family: Eulophidae
- Genus: Alophomorphella
- Species: A. infaceta

Binomial name
- Alophomorphella infaceta Ubaidillah, 2006

Species of insect

Alophomorphella infaceta is a species of insect from the Eulophidae family. It was described by Rosichon Ubaidillah in 2006. It is found in North Sulawesi and Halmahera, Indonesia. It is identifiable by the coarse reticulation on its scutellum.

== Etymology ==
The species' name comes from the Latin root infacetus, meaning coarse. This is in reference to the texture of its scutellum.
