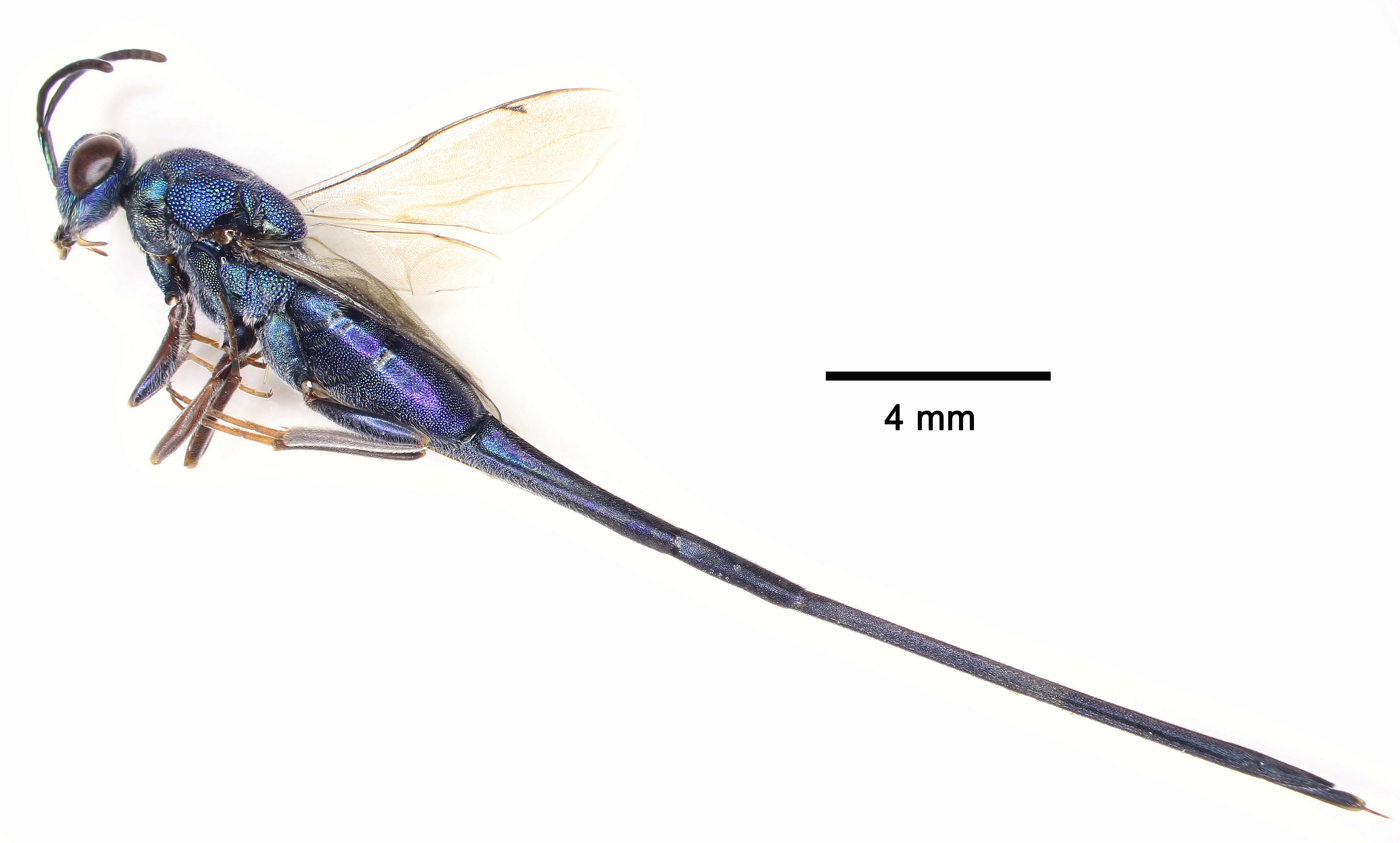
- Solenura ania, female from China

Scientific classification
- Kingdom: Animalia
- Phylum: Arthropoda
- Clade: Pancrustacea
- Class: Insecta
- Order: Hymenoptera
- Family: Lyciscidae
- Genus: Solenura; Westwood, 1868

Type species
- Solenura telescopica Westwood, 1868

= Solenura =

Genus of wasps

Solenura is a genus of parasitic chalcidoid wasps with species found around the world. Males and females are dimorphic with females having a long ovipositor used for inserting the eggs into beetle larvae boring inside dead wood. Males are very rarely seen. It was sometimes placed within the family Pteromalidae and is now placed within the family Lyciscidae although it is found to be closely related to the genera Heydenia, Ditropinotella and Grooca.

Species in the genus include:

- Solenura carinatus (Brues, 1907)
- Solenura fuscoaenea Masi, 1943
- Solenura nigra (Walker, 1872)
- Solenura ania (Walker, 1846)
- Solenura feretrius (Walker, 1846)
- Solenura keralensis (Narendran, 1992)
