= Alophomorphella marosia =

Scientific classification
- Kingdom: Animalia
- Phylum: Arthropoda
- Clade: Pancrustacea
- Class: Insecta
- Order: Hymenoptera
- Family: Eulophidae
- Genus: Alophomorphella
- Species: A. marosia

Binomial name
- Alophomorphella marosia Ubaidillah, 2006

Species of insect

Alophomorphella marosia is a species of insect from the Eulophidae family. It was described by Ubaidillah in 2006. The species is found in Maros Regency, from South Sulawesi, Indonesia.

== Etymology ==
The species is named directly after the regency where it was found.
