= Aroplectrus dimerus =

- Aroplectrus dimerus

Scientific classification
- Kingdom: Animalia
- Phylum: Arthropoda
- Clade: Pancrustacea
- Class: Insecta
- Order: Hymenoptera
- Family: Eulophidae
- Genus: Aroplectrus
- Species: A. dimerus

Binomial name
- Aroplectrus dimerus Lin, 1963

Species of insect

Aroplectrus dimerus is a species of chalcid wasp in the family Eulophidae. It was described by Lin in 1963. It has been used to combat Limacodid pests, namely the stinging nettle caterpillar.

== Etymology ==
The species name comes from the Greek roots, di- and meros, which mean "two" and "part" respectively.

== Distribution ==
The species is naturally found in Guangxi (Napo and Pingxiang) and Hainan (Sanya.) It was introduced to Hawaii in 2010 as a non-invasive species, in order to take care of the stinging nettle caterpillar populations.
