= Aroplectrus areolatus =

Scientific classification
- Kingdom: Animalia
- Phylum: Arthropoda
- Clade: Pancrustacea
- Class: Insecta
- Order: Hymenoptera
- Family: Eulophidae
- Genus: Aroplectrus
- Species: A. areolatus

Binomial name
- Aroplectrus areolatus Ferrière, 1941

Synonyms
- Neoplectrus areolatus Ferrière, 1941

Species of insect

Aroplectrus areolatus is a species of chalcid wasps in the family Eulophidae. It was described in 1941 by Charles Ferrière. It is colored almost completely yellow, and its size ranges from 1.2-1.8 mm.

== Etymology ==
The species is named after the areola, which it has four of on its propodeum.

== Distribution ==
The species is found in Sulawesi of Indonesia, and Kuala Lumpur of Malaysia.
