= Aroplectrus =

- Aroplectrus flavescens

Scientific classification
- Kingdom: Animalia
- Phylum: Arthropoda
- Clade: Pancrustacea
- Class: Insecta
- Order: Hymenoptera
- Family: Eulophidae
- Subfamily: Eulophinae
- Genus: Aroplectrus; Lin, 1963

Type species
- Aroplectrus dimerus Lin, 1963

Species
- Aroplectrus areolatus Ferrière, 1941; Aroplectrus contheylae Narendran, 2002; Aroplectrus dimerus Lin, 1963; Aroplectrus flavescens Crawford, 1915; Aroplectrus haplomerus Lin, 1963; Aroplectrus noyesi Narendran, 2011

Genus of wasps

Aroplectrus is a genus of hymenopteran insects of the family Eulophidae. It was described by Lin in 1963. It uses Lepidopteran species as its hosts.

== Etymology ==
The genus name derives aro from the four areolae located on its propodeum.

== Distribution ==
Species are found in India, Indonesia, Thailand, China, Philippines, and Taiwan.
