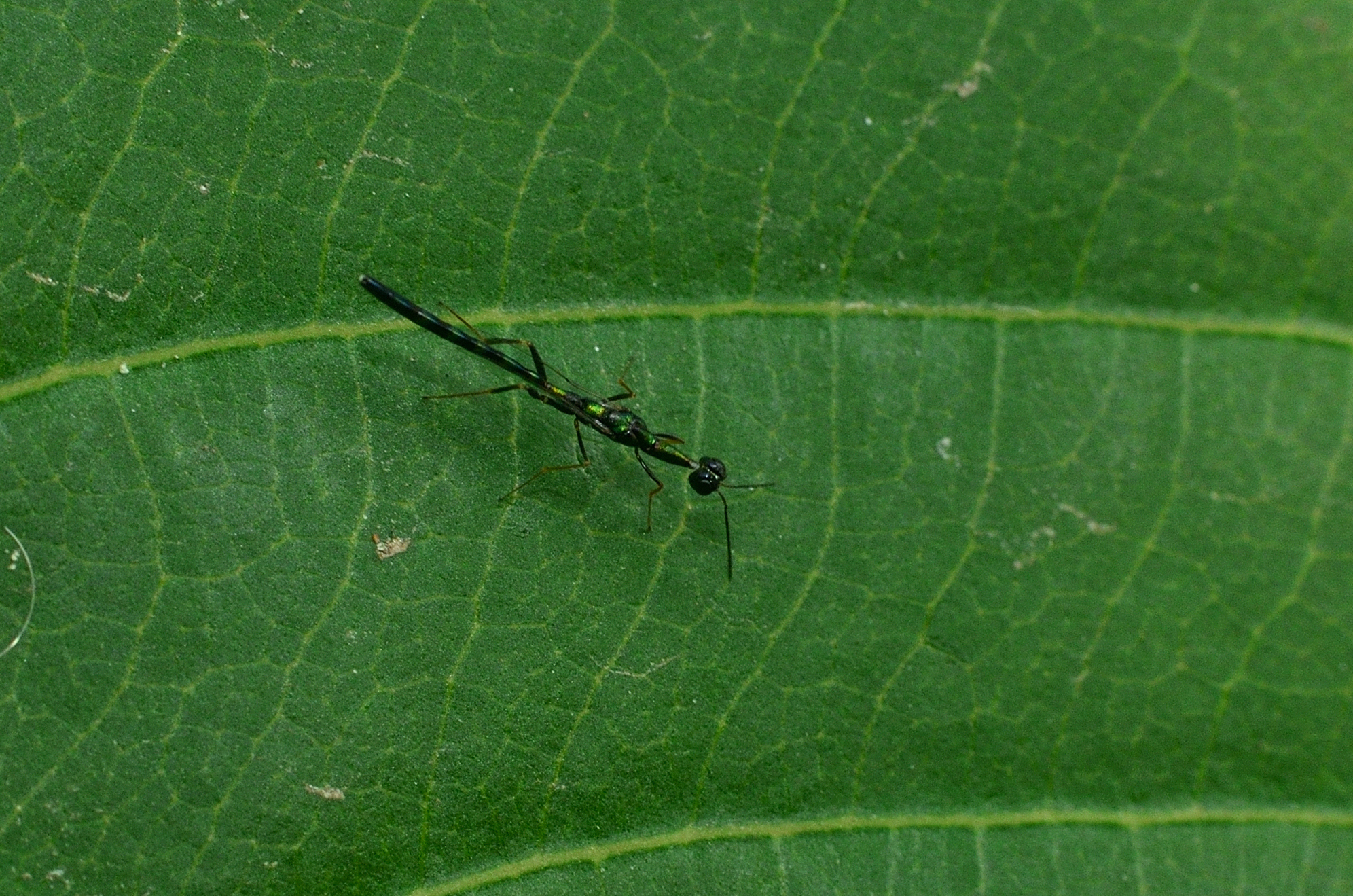
- Doddifoenus burksi (male)

Scientific classification
- Domain: Eukaryota
- Kingdom: Animalia
- Phylum: Arthropoda
- Class: Insecta
- Order: Hymenoptera
- Family: Pelecinellidae
- Genus: Doddifoenus; Boucek, 1988

Species
- Doddifoenus australiensis (Dodd, 1927); Doddifoenus burksi Gupta et al., 2022; Doddifoenus rex Boucek, 1988; Doddifoenus wallacei Burks & Krogmann, 2009

= Doddifoenus =

Genus of wasps

Doddifoenus is a genus of wasps in the family Pelecinellidae. They are parasitoids of wood-boring beetles.
