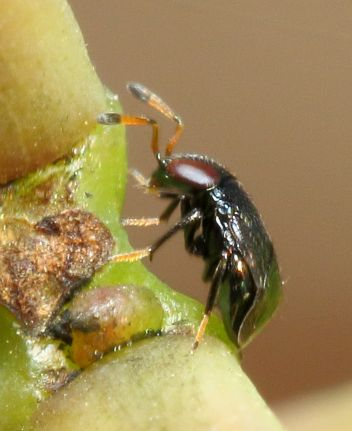
- Aenasius sp.

Scientific classification
- Kingdom: Animalia
- Phylum: Arthropoda
- Class: Insecta
- Order: Hymenoptera
- Family: Encyrtidae
- Subfamily: Tetracneminae
- Genus: Aenasius; Walker, 1846

Species
- See text

Synonyms
- Chalcaspis Howard, 1895; Neodiscodes Compere, 1931; Pseudanasius Hayat, Alam & Agarwal, 1975

= Aenasius =

Genus of wasps

Aenacius is a genus of parasitic wasps in the family Encyrtidae. They are parasitoids of mealybug nymphs.

== Species ==
The following species have been recognised:

- Aenasius abengouroui (Risbec, 1949)
- Aenasius advena Compere, 1937
- Aenasius arizonensis (Girault, 1915)
- Aenasius bambawalei
- Aenasius bolowi Mercet, 1947
- Aenasius brethesi De Santis, 1964
- Aenasius caeruleus Brues, 1910
- Aenasius chapadae Ashmead, 1900
- Aenasius chilecito Trjapitzin & Trjapitzin, 1999
- Aenasius cirrha Noyes & Ren, 1995
- Aenasius comperei (Kerrich, 1967)
- Aenasius connectens Kerrich, 1967
- Aenasius dives Noyes & Ren, 1995
- Aenasius flandersi Kerrich, 1967
- Aenasius frontalis Compere, 1937
- Aenasius hayati Manickavasagam, 2012
- Aenasius hyettus (Walker, 1846)
- Aenasius indicus (Narayanan & Subba Rao, 1961)
- Aenasius insularis Compere, 1937
- Aenasius kerrichi Noyes & Ren, 1995
- Aenasius lepelleyi (Kerrich, 1953)
- Aenasius longiscapus Compere, 1937
- Aenasius lua Noyes & Ren, 1995
- Aenasius lucidus (Kerrich, 1967)
- Aenasius maplei Compere, 1937
- Aenasius martinii (Compere, 1931)
- Aenasius masii Domenichini, 1951
- Aenasius mitchellae Noyes & Ren, 1995
- Aenasius nitens Kerrich, 1967
- Aenasius parvus (Kerrich, 1967)
- Aenasius paulistus Compere, 1937
- Aenasius pelops Noyes & Ren, 1995
- Aenasius pergandei (Howard, 1895)
- Aenasius phenacocci (Ashmead, 1902)
- Aenasius philo Noyes, 2000
- Aenasius punctatus Compere, 1937
- Aenasius quezadai Noyes, 2000
- Aenasius regularis Kerrich, 1967
- Aenasius simlaensis (Kaul & Agarwal, 1986)
- Aenasius subbaraoi (Kerrich, 1967)
- Aenasius tachigaliae (Brues, 1922)
- Aenasius vexans Kerrich, 1967
- Aenasius zeuxis Noyes, 2000
