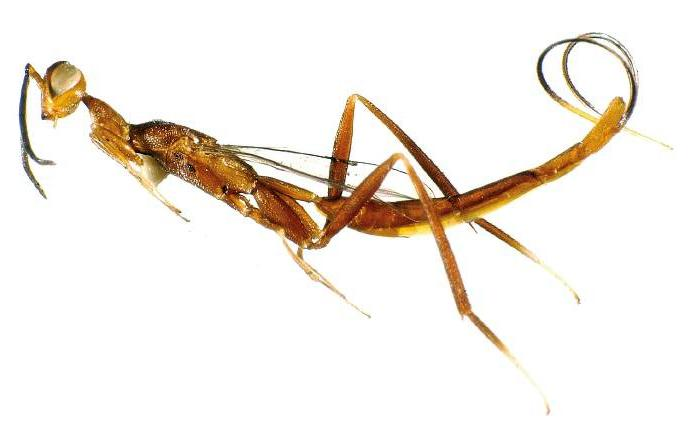
- Leptofoenus rufus (female)

Scientific classification
- Domain: Eukaryota
- Kingdom: Animalia
- Phylum: Arthropoda
- Class: Insecta
- Order: Hymenoptera
- Family: Pelecinellidae
- Genus: Leptofoenus; Smith, 1862

Species
- L. howardi; L. peleciniformis; †L. pittfieldae; L. rufus; L. stephanoides; L. westwoodi

= Leptofoenus =

Genus of wasps

Leptofoenus is a genus of wasp in the family Pelecinellidae found in South America, Central America, and southern North America. The genus contains five living species and one extinct species known from early Miocene Burdigalian stage Dominican amber deposits on the island of Hispaniola. With body sizes ranging from 11–27 millimetres (0.43–1.06 in) Leptofoenus species are larger than nearly all other species in Chalcidoidea. The genus bears a notable resemblance to the wasp families Pelecinidae, Gasteruptiidae, and Stephanidae.

== Species ==
All six known species are restricted to the western Hemisphere, most being found in South America and only one reaching North America.

- Leptofoenus howardi (Ashmead) Paraguay, Brazil, Surinam
- Leptofoenus peleciniformis Smith Brazil, Peru, Venezuela, Costa Rica
- †Leptofoenus pittfieldae Engel Dominican Republic (Early Miocene)
- Leptofoenus rufus LaSalle & Stage Mexico, southwestern USA
- Leptofoenus stephanoides (Roman) Argentina, Paraguay, Brazil, French Guiana, Venezuela, Colombia, Panama, Costa Rica, southern Mexico
- Leptofoenus westwoodi (Ashmead) Argentina, Bolivia, Brazil, Peru, Venezuela, Guyana, Trinidad, Panama
