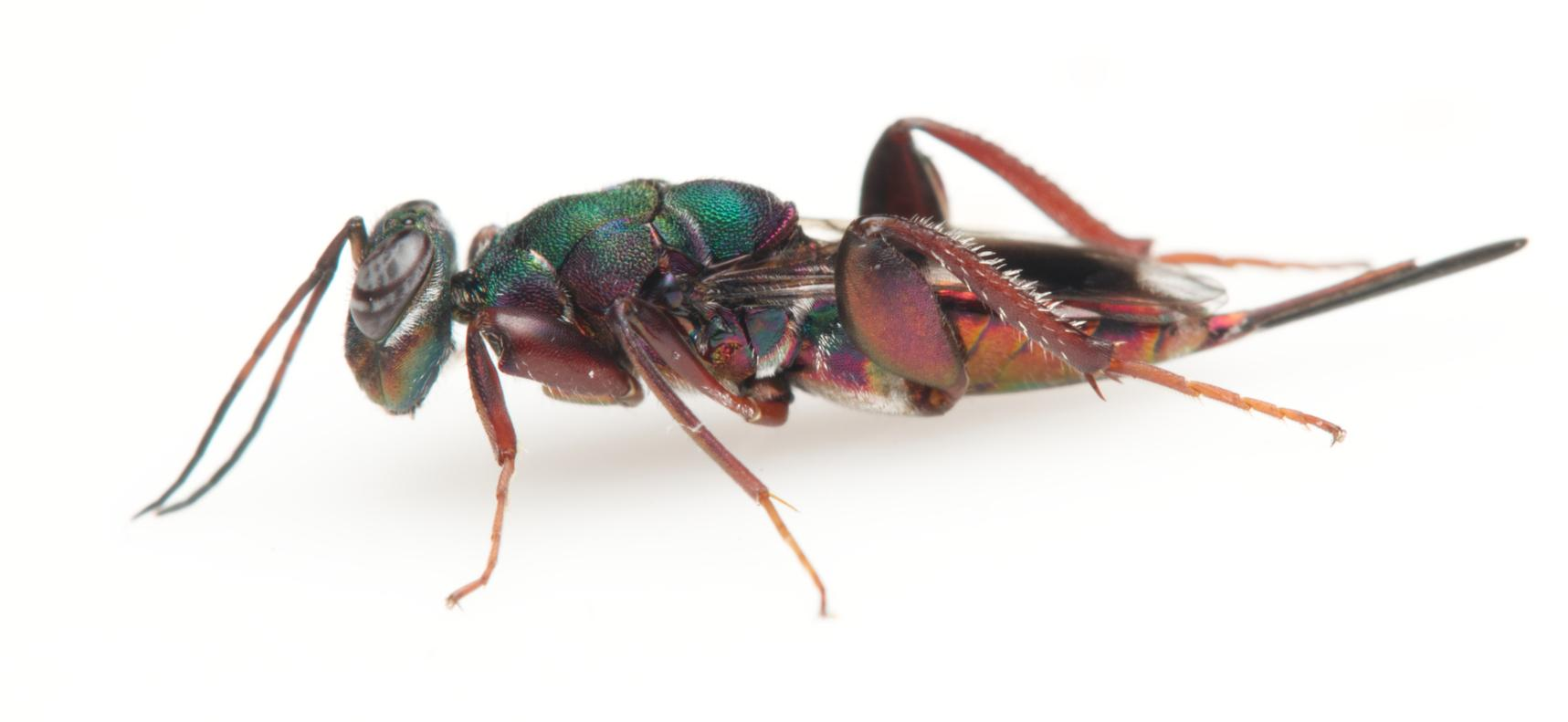
- Thaumasura sp.

Scientific classification
- Kingdom: Animalia
- Phylum: Arthropoda
- Class: Insecta
- Order: Hymenoptera
- Superfamily: Chalcidoidea
- Family: Lyciscidae; Bouček, 1958

Subfamilies
- Lyciscinae; Solenurinae

= Lyciscidae =

Family of wasps

Lyciscidae is a family of chalcid wasps. The genera comprising this family were previously placed in the Cleonyminae subfamily of a paraphyletic Pteromalidae.

== Description and biology ==
Many species have metallic green, blue and bronze colours, and stout hind legs and fore legs. The females of most species have a tapered abdomen and a long ovipositor suited to accessing hosts concealed in wood; they are often encountered on trunks or branches of trees. Many are parasitoids of wood-boring beetles of the families Buprestidae (jewel beetles), Cerambycidae (longhorn beetles), and Curculionidae (weevils). However, some Agamerion species are parasitoids of cockroach egg masses, Epistenia species parasitize twig-nesting aculeate wasps and bees, and Marxiana grandiosa is a hyperparasite of braconid wasps (which are, in turn, parasitoids of wood-boring beetles).

== Subfamilies and genera ==
=== Lyciscinae ===
- Agamerion
- Amazonisca
- Chadwickia
- Epistenia
- Eupelmophotismus
- Hadroepistenia
- Hedqvistia
- Lycisca
- Marxiana
- Mesamotura
- Neboissia
- Neoepistenia
- Nepistenia
- Paralycisca
- Parepistenia
- Proglochin
- Proshizonotus
- Protoepistenia
- Riekisura
- Romanisca
- Scaphepistenia
- Shedoepistenia
- Striatacanthus
- Thaumasura
- Urolycisca
- Westwoodiana

=== Solenurinae ===
- Grooca
- Solenura

== Gallery ==
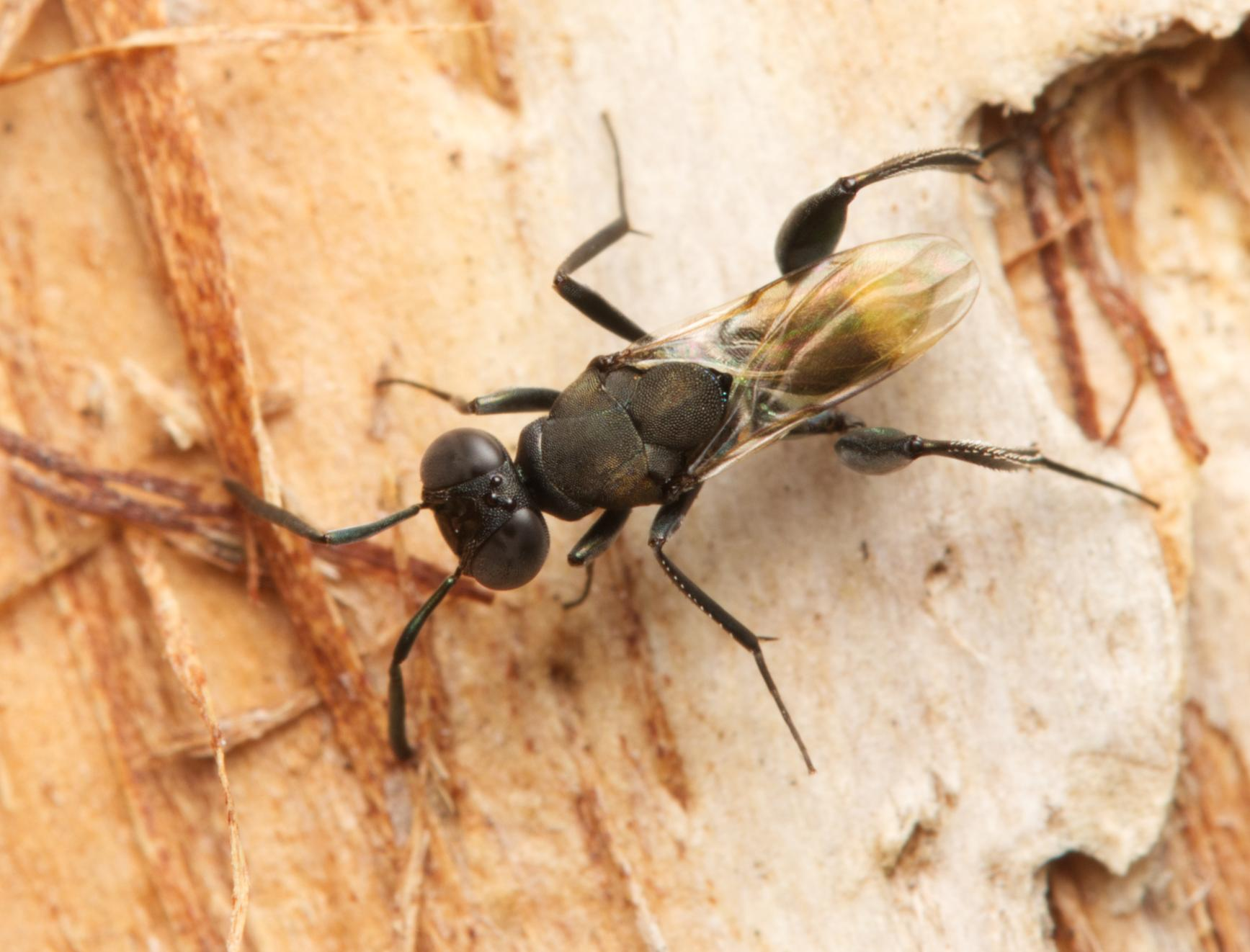
Agamerion sp., Australia.

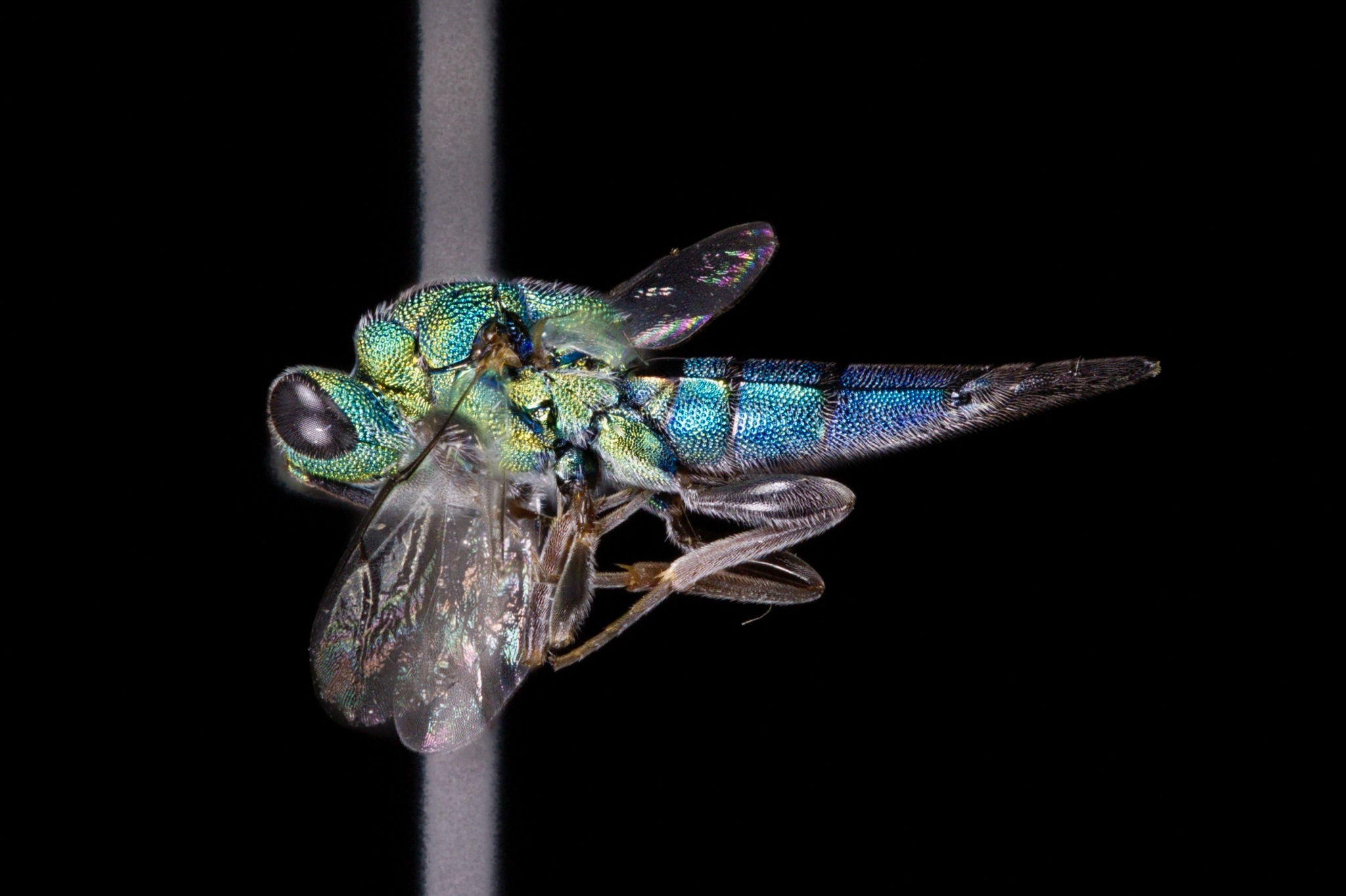
Epistenia coeruleata, USA.

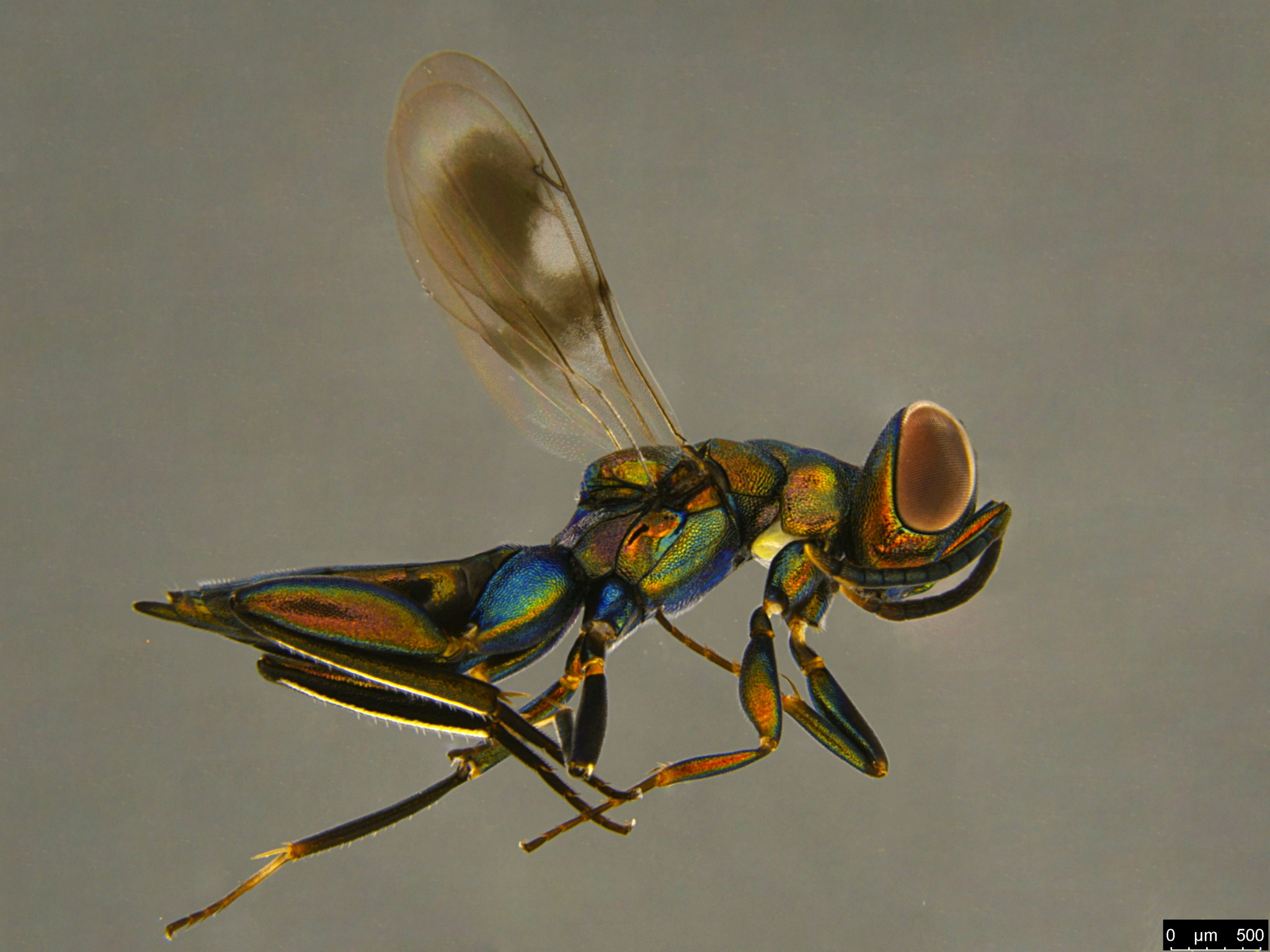
Eupelmophotismus sp., Australia.

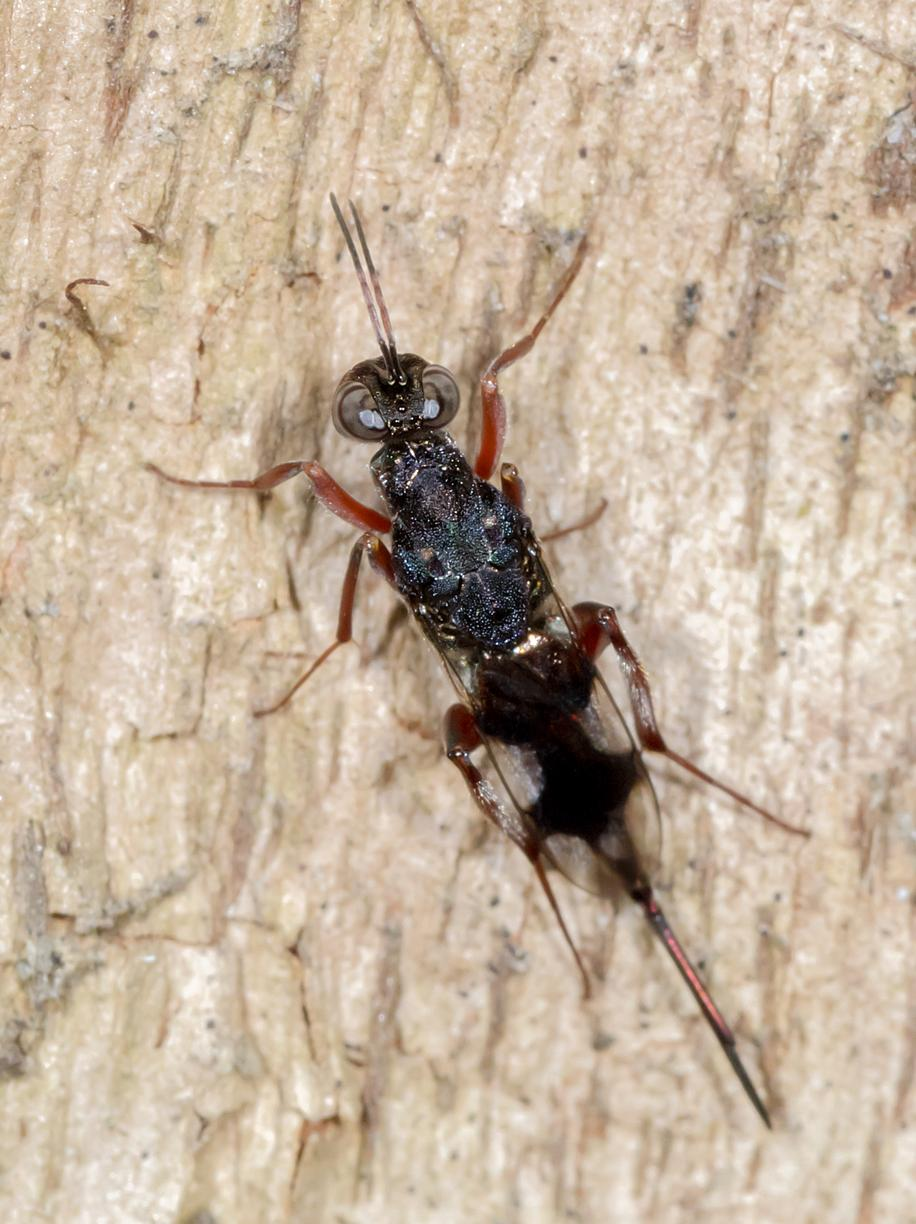
Thaumasura sp., Australia.

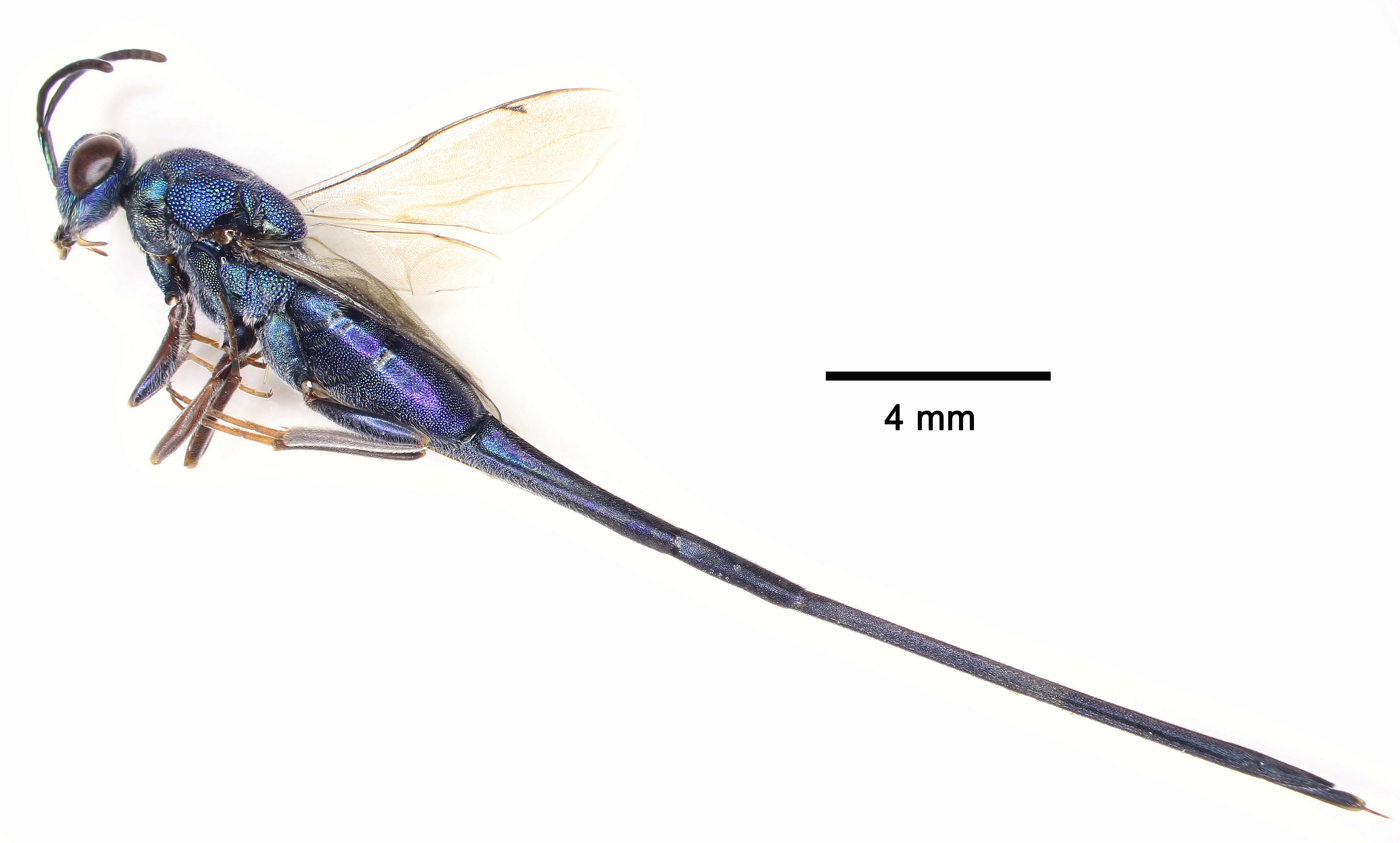
Solenura ania, China.
