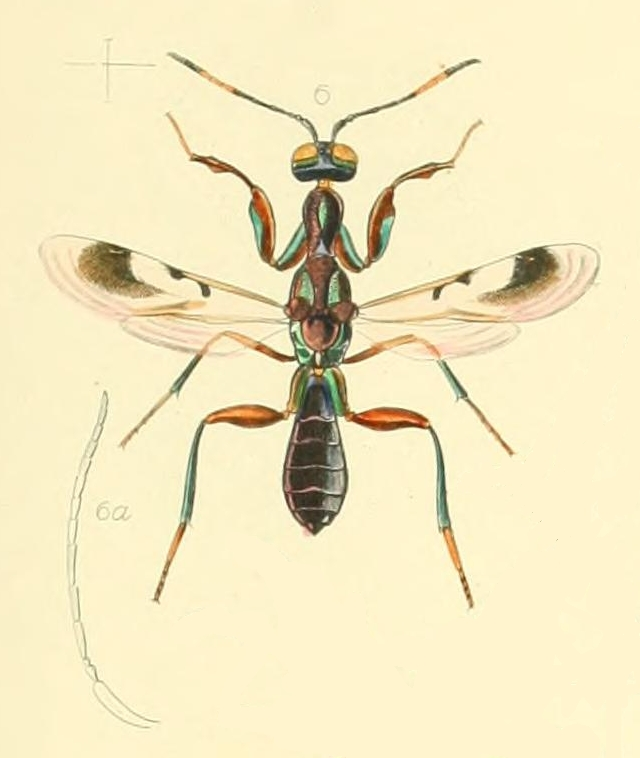
- Heydenia natalensis

Scientific classification
- Kingdom: Animalia
- Phylum: Arthropoda
- Class: Insecta
- Order: Hymenoptera
- Family: Heydeniidae
- Genus: Heydenia; Förster, 1856

Species
- see text

Synonyms
- Paraheydenia Cameron 1912; Pterooderella Risbec 1952; Risbecisca Hedqvist 1960; Heydenisca Hedqvist 1967

= Heydenia =

Genus of wasps

Heydenia is a genus of wasps in the family Heydeniidae (superfamily Chalcidoidea). They are parasitoids of bark beetles.

== Species ==
- Heydenia angularicoxa Yang 1996
- Heydenia bambeyi Risbec
- Heydenia burgeoni (Risbec)
- Heydenia coomoni Xiao & Huang
- Heydenia cristatipennis (Girault)
- Heydenia gibsoni Sureshan
- Heydenia indica Narendran 2001
- Heydenia longicollis (Cameron)
- Heydenia madagascariensis (Hedqvist)
- Heydenia mateui (Hedqvist)
- Heydenia natalensis (Westwood)
- Heydenia ornata (Risbec)
- Heydenia pretiosa Förster 1856
- Heydenia scolyti Yang
- Heydenia seyrigi (Risbec)
- Heydenia testacea Yang
- Heydenia trinodis Boucek
- Heydenia tuberculata Sureshan 1999
- Heydenia unica Cook & Davis
