= Doddifoenus wallacei =

Scientific classification
- Domain: Eukaryota
- Kingdom: Animalia
- Phylum: Arthropoda
- Class: Insecta
- Order: Hymenoptera
- Family: Pelecinellidae
- Genus: Doddifoenus
- Species: D. wallacei

Binomial name
- Doddifoenus wallacei Burks & Krogmann, 2009

Species of wasp

Doddifoenus wallacei is a species of wasp in the family Pelecinellidae. It is the longest known species in the superfamily Chalcidoidea; the female has a length (including ovipositor) of up to 41.4 mm, and its body length ranges from 17.1 to 19.6 mm.

The species is diurnal and is known only from Thailand.
