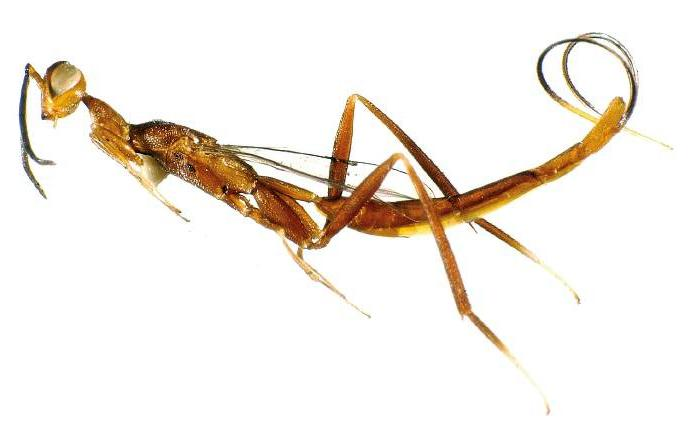
- Leptofoenus rufus (female)

Scientific classification
- Domain: Eukaryota
- Kingdom: Animalia
- Phylum: Arthropoda
- Class: Insecta
- Order: Hymenoptera
- Suborder: Apocrita
- Infraorder: Proctotrupomorpha
- Superfamily: Chalcidoidea
- Family: Pelecinellidae; Ashmead, 1895

Genera
- Nefoenus; Doddifoenus; Leptofoenus

= Pelecinellidae =

Family of wasps

Pelecinellidae is a small family of chalcidoid wasps, formerly treated as the subfamily Leptofoeninae within Pteromalidae. They, like many small chalcidoids, are brilliantly metallic.

The subfamily contains three genera; Nefoenus, Doddifoenus (with four species) and Leptofoenus (with five extant species). The species Doddifoenus wallacei is the largest known chalcidoid wasp, reaching nearly 5 cm (2.0 in) in length (including the ovipositor).

The first pelecinellid species known from the fossil record, Leptofoenus pittfieldae, was described in 2009 by Michael S. Engel from a specimen found in Dominican amber.
