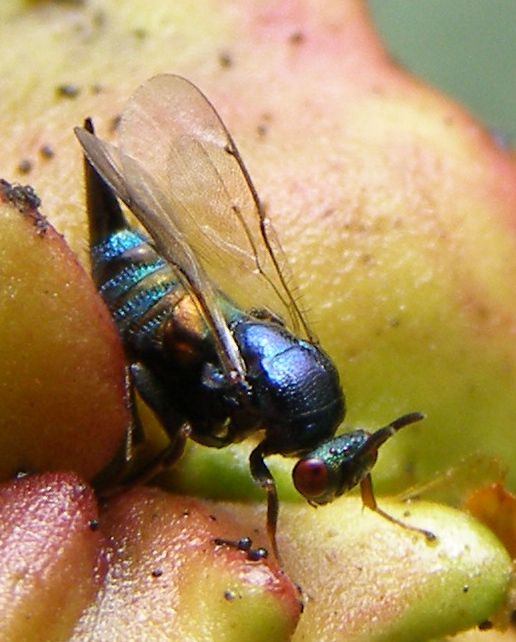
- Ormyrus sp.

Scientific classification
- Kingdom: Animalia
- Phylum: Arthropoda
- Class: Insecta
- Order: Hymenoptera
- Superfamily: Chalcidoidea
- Family: Ormyridae; Förster, 1856

Genera
- Asparagobius; Eubeckerella; Halleriaphagus; Hemadas; Ormyrus; Ouma

= Ormyridae =

Family of wasp

The Ormyridae are a small family of parasitic wasps in the superfamily Chalcidoidea. They are either parasitoids or hyperparasitoids on gall-forming insects, primarily cynipid wasps and tephritid flies. There are 153 species, mostly in the genus Ormyrus); the family has a worldwide distribution, although almost entirely absent from South America.

Some can be recognized by distinctive scalloped sculpturing of their metasomal tergites. Adults of many species are iridescent.

== Taxonomy ==
Reviewed in 2024.

=== Asparagobiinae van Noort, Burks, Mitroiu and Rasplus, 2024 ===
- Asparagobius Mayr, 1905.
  - Asparagobius bouceki van Noort, 2024
  - Asparagobius braunsi Mayr, 1905.
  - Asparagobius copelandi Rasplus and van Noort, 2024
- Halleriaphagus van Noort and Burks, 2024
  - Halleriaphagus phagolucida van Noort and Burks, 2024

=== Hemadinae van Noort, Burks, Mitroiu and Rasplus, 2024 ===
- Hemadas Crawford, 1909.
  - Hemadas nubilipennis (Ashmead, 1887).

=== Ormyrinae Förster, 1856 ===
- Eubeckerella Narendran, 1999.
  - Eubeckerella malaica Narendran, 1999.
- Ormyrus Westwood, 1832.
  - List of Ormyrus species (more than 140 species recognized)
- Ouma Mitroiu, 2024.
  - Ouma daleskeyae Mitroiu, 2024.
  - Ouma emazantsi Mitroiu, 2024.
