= T. C. Narendran =

Indian entomologist (1944–2013)

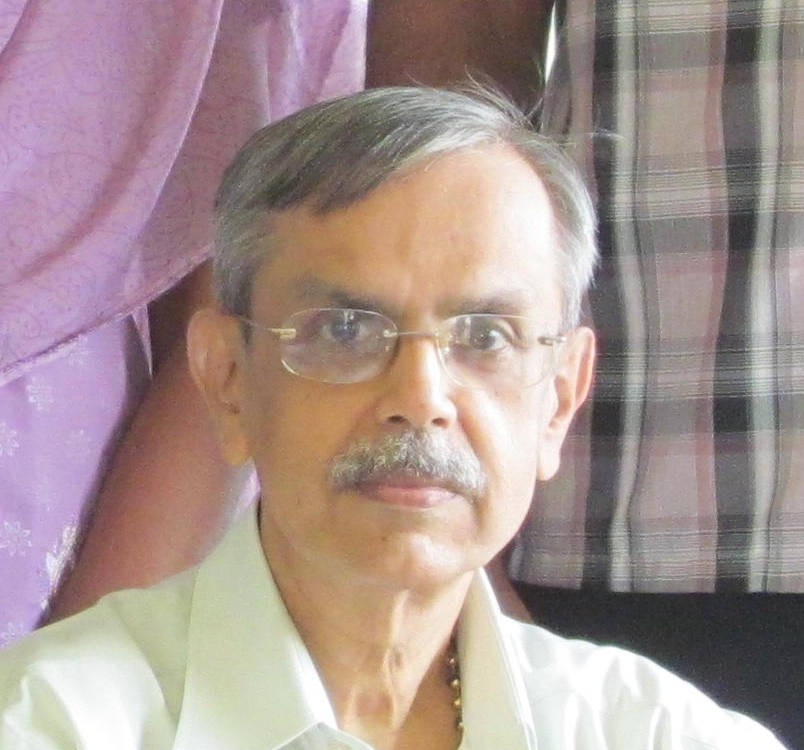
Narendran in 2014

Thekke Curuppath Narendran (middle name sometimes written Kuruppath; 24 February 1944 – 31 December 2013) was an Indian entomologist specializing in the systematics of parasitic wasps in the superfamily Chalcidoidea (Hymenoptera).

Narendran received a Janakiammal National Award for Taxonomy (2004) and was a Fellow of the Indian Academy of Sciences, Bangalore (IASc) and the Indian Entomology Academy, Chennai.

Narendran's major publications include monographs on the Oriental Chalcididae (1989), Torymidae & Eurytomidae of Indian Subcontinent (1994) and Indo-Australian Ormyridae (1999) - and some 300 research papers in various scientific journals describing 700 new species and over 50 new genera. Narendran mentored a number of taxonomists at the Calicut University where he worked.

Narendran died on 31 December 2013, aged 69, of a heart attack.

== Key publications ==
- Narendran, T.C. 1974. Oriental Brachymeria. Department of Zoology, University of Calicut, Kerala, India.
- Narendran, T.C. 1989. Oriental Chalcididae (Hymenoptera: Chalcidoidea). Zoological Monograph. Department of Zoology, University of Calicut, Kerala, India. 441pp.
- Narendran, T.C. 1994. Torymidae and Eurytomidae of Indian subcontinent. University of Calicut, Kerala, India. 500pp.
- Narendran, T.C. 1999. Indo-Australian Ormyridae (Hymenoptera: Chalcidoidea). Privately published. iii + 227 pp.
- Narendran, T.C. 2007. Indian Chalcidoid Parasitoids of the Tetrastichinae (Hymenoptera: Eulophidae). Occasional Paper No. 272, Zoological Survey of India, Kolkata. vi + 390pp.
