= List of Tychius species =

This is a list of 631 species in the genus Tychius.

== Tychius species ==
- Tychius acosmus Tournier, H., 1873
- Tychius adspersulus Desbr. d. Loges, 1908
- Tychius adspersus Desbr. d. Loges, 1908
- Tychius affinis Becker, 1864
- Tychius afflatus Caldara, 1990
- Tychius afflictus Hustache, 1936
- Tychius africanus Franz, 1945
- Tychius akbesianus Pic, M., 1904
- Tychius albidus Klima, A., 1936
- Tychius albilaterus Stierlin, W.G., 1863
- Tychius albocruciatus Reitter, E., 1897
- Tychius alboguttatus Redtenbacher, 1843
- Tychius albolineatus Dejean, 1836
- Tychius albonotatus Pic, M., 1902
- Tychius albosparsus Fåhraeus, O.I., 1871
- Tychius albosuturalis Pic, 1929
- Tychius albosuturatus Pic, M., 1929
- Tychius albovestitus Pic, 1919
- Tychius albovittatus Ch. Bris., 1862
- Tychius albovittis Gemminger, M. & Harold, E. von q., 1871
- Tychius albulus Gyllenhal, 1835
- Tychius algiricus Desbr. d. Loges, 1908
- Tychius alhagi Clark, 1976
- Tychius alluaudi Hoffmann, 1952
- Tychius alpensis Hoffmann, 1961
- Tychius alpinus Hustache, 1926
- Tychius amabilis Faust, J., 1894
- Tychius amandus Faust, J.,
- Tychius ambiguus Caldara, 1996
- Tychius amoenus Say, 1831
- Tychius amplicollis Aubé, 1850
- Tychius amplus Karasev & Caldara, 1992
- Tychius ancora Gyllenhal, 1835
- Tychius angolanus Caldara, 1986
- Tychius annulatus Billberg, 1820
- Tychius antennalis Hustache, 1946
- Tychius antoinei Hustache, 1932
- Tychius antonei Hustache, A., 1932
- Tychius approximatus Desbr. d. Loges, 1908
- Tychius aquilus Caldara, 1996
- Tychius arator Gyllenhal, 1835
- Tychius aratus Say, 1831
- Tychius arcirostris Normand, 1938
- Tychius ardea Faust, J., 1887
- Tychius areatus Rey, C., 1895
- Tychius argentatus Chevrolat, L.A.A., 1859
- Tychius argentellus Desbr. d. Loges, 1908
- Tychius argenteosquamosus Desbr. d. Loges, 1908
- Tychius aridicola Wollaston, T.V., 1864
- Tychius arietatus Tournier, H., 1873
- Tychius armatus Green, 1920
- Tychius armeniacus Pic, M., 1904
- Tychius aspalathi Caldara, 1989
- Tychius asperatus Dufour, 1843
- Tychius astragali Becker, 1862
- Tychius astrifer Caldara, 1996
- Tychius atlasicus Hustache, 1946
- Tychius atomus Casey, 1910
- Tychius auliensis Pic, M., 1904
- Tychius aurarius Boheman, 1843
- Tychius aureolus Hustache, A., 1931
- Tychius aureomicans Tournier, H., 1873
- Tychius auricapillus Suffrian, E., 1871
- Tychius aurichalceus Gyllenhal, 1835
- Tychius auricollis Gyllenhal, 1835
- Tychius auripilus Rey, C., 1895
- Tychius auritus Schoenherr, 1826
- Tychius auroillitus Pic, 1925
- Tychius badius Clark, 1971
- Tychius bajtenovi Caldara, 1986
- Tychius balcanicus Caldara, 1990
- Tychius baldshuanus Penecke, 1936
- Tychius balearicus Desbr. d. Loges, 1908
- Tychius banfii Caldara & Fremuth, 1992
- Tychius barcelonicus Desbr. d. Loges, 1908
- Tychius barclayi Caldara, 2013
- Tychius beckeri Tournier, H., 1873
- Tychius beckerianus Desbr. d. Loges, 1895
- Tychius bedeli Faust, J., 1885
- Tychius bellus Kirsch, T., 1870
- Tychius beloni Pic, M., 1908
- Tychius bertolinii Stierlin, W.G., 1894
- Tychius berytensis Pic, 1917
- Tychius bicolor Ch. Bris., 1862
- Tychius biskrensis Faust, J., 1885
- Tychius bisquamosus Pic, M., 1902
- Tychius bivittatus Klima, A., 1936
- Tychius bremondi Hoffmann, 1942
- Tychius brevicollis Rey, C., 1895
- Tychius brevicornis Waterhouse, 1862
- Tychius brevipennis Pic, M., 1902
- Tychius brevitarsis Hustache, 1946
- Tychius breviusculus Desbr. d. Loges, 1873
- Tychius brisouti Tournier, H., 1873
- Tychius bruleriei Desbr. d. Loges, 1898
- Tychius brunnensis Formánek, 1923
- Tychius caesius Clark, 1971
- Tychius caldarai Dieckmann, 1986
- Tychius callidus Caldara, 1990
- Tychius candidus Marshall, 1941
- Tychius canescens Stephens, 1829
- Tychius capreolus Caldara, 1996
- Tychius caroli Pic, M., 1898
- Tychius carolinae Casey, 1910
- Tychius carpini Schoenherr, 1825
- Tychius centromaculatus Schoenherr, 1843
- Tychius cereris Caldara, 1989
- Tychius cervicolor Desbr. d. Loges, 1908
- Tychius cervinoaureus Desbr. d. Loges, 1908
- Tychius chaboti Hustache, 1923
- Tychius chembaensis Hustache, 1932
- Tychius chevrolati Tournier, H., 1873
- Tychius chobauti Desbr. d. Loges, 1895
- Tychius ciceris Penecke, 1922
- Tychius ciliatus Gyllenhal, 1835
- Tychius ciliciensis Pic, M., 1905
- Tychius cinerascens Stephens, 1829
- Tychius cinnamomeus Kiesenwetter, H. von, 1851
- Tychius circulatus Hustache, 1946
- Tychius clavipes Rey, C., 1895
- Tychius clavivarius Lea, 1915
- Tychius colonnellii Caldara, 1991
- Tychius comptus Tournier, H., 1873
- Tychius conformis Faust, J., 1885
- Tychius confusus Desbr. d. Loges, 1873
- Tychius conspersus Rosenhauer, 1856
- Tychius contemptus Desbr. d. Loges, 1908
- Tychius convexiusculus Desbr. d. Loges, 1908
- Tychius corniculatus Fåhraeus, 1843
- Tychius corsosardous Caldara, 2013
- Tychius crassifemoris Caldara, 1986
- Tychius crassior Desbr. d. Loges, 1908
- Tychius crassirostris Kirsch, T., 1871
- Tychius cretaceus Kiesenwetter, H. von, 1851
- Tychius cristatus Caldara, 1996
- Tychius crypticus Caldara, 1986
- Tychius cupricolor Penecke, 1936
- Tychius cuprifer Schoenherr, 1825
- Tychius cupriferoides Ragusa, 1923
- Tychius cuprinus Rosensch., 1856
- Tychius curtipennis Casey, 1910
- Tychius curtirostris Desbr. d. Loges, 1873
- Tychius curtus Ch. Bris., 1862
- Tychius curvirostris Ch. Bris., 1862
- Tychius cyaneus Dejean,
- Tychius cylindricollis Solari, 1950
- Tychius cylindritubus Desbr. d. Loges, 1908
- Tychius dalmatinus Pic, 1917
- Tychius danieli Franz, 1942
- Tychius decellei Caldara, 1989
- Tychius decoratus Rosenhauer, 1856
- Tychius decretus Tournier, H., 1873
- Tychius deliciosus Perris, E., 1870
- Tychius denominandus Faust, J., 1889
- Tychius densevestitus Caldara in Caldara, Colonnelli & Osella, 2009
- Tychius densisquamis Caldara, 1989
- Tychius dentatus Rey, C., 1895
- Tychius denticrus Desbr. d. Loges, 1892
- Tychius dentipes Tournier, H., 1873
- Tychius depauperatus Wollaston, T.V., 1864
- Tychius deplanatus Desbr. d. Loges, 1873
- Tychius depressicollis Tournier, H., 1873
- Tychius depressus Klima, A., 1936
- Tychius desbrochersi Klima, A., 1936
- Tychius diabolicus Caldara, 1996
- Tychius dieckmanni Caldara, 1986
- Tychius dieneri Hajóss, 1938
- Tychius difficilis Tournier, H., 1873
- Tychius diffusus Caldara, 1989
- Tychius dilectus Casey, 1910
- Tychius dimidiatipennis Desbr. d. Loges, 1873
- Tychius dimidiatirostris Desbr. d. Loges, 1907
- Tychius discicollis Faust, J., 1889
- Tychius discoloma Suffrian, E., 1871
- Tychius discolor Fåhraeus, O.I., 1871
- Tychius dispar Desbr. d. Loges, 1908
- Tychius distans Faust, J., 1885
- Tychius diversepubens Pic, M., 1908
- Tychius doderoi Caldara, 1990
- Tychius dorsalis Billberg, 1820
- Tychius dulcis Casey, 1910
- Tychius echinus Casey, 1910
- Tychius edentatus Desbr. d. Loges, 1895
- Tychius eldae Caldara, 1990
- Tychius elegans Brullé, 1832
- Tychius elegantulus Hustache, A., 1931
- Tychius ellipsiformis Desbr. d. Loges, 1895
- Tychius elongatior Desbr. d. Loges, 1898
- Tychius elongatulus Desbr. d. Loges, 1897
- Tychius elongatus Gyllenhal, 1835
- Tychius endroedyi Caldara, 1989
- Tychius ensirostris Caldara, 1996
- Tychius ephippiatus Fairmaire, 1870
- Tychius eremita Caldara, 1989
- Tychius errans Casey, 1910
- Tychius erraticus Casey, 1910
- Tychius exiguus Faust, J., 1889
- Tychius extensus Caldara, 1989
- Tychius facetus Faust, J., 1891
- Tychius fagniezi Hoffmann, 1936
- Tychius fallax Rey, C., 1895
- Tychius fallens Desbr. d. Loges, 1908
- Tychius fanalesi Ragusa, E., 1908
- Tychius farinosus Gebler, 1830
- Tychius fasciatus Billberg, 1820
- Tychius fatuus Casey, 1910
- Tychius fausti Reitter, E., 1896
- Tychius femoralis Ch. Bris., 1862
- Tychius femoratus Tempère, 1961
- Tychius ferox Wickham, H.F., 1917
- Tychius festivus Caldara, 1990
- Tychius filirostris Wollaston, T.V., 1854
- Tychius flavicollis Stephens, 1829
- Tychius flavicornis Desbr. d. Loges, 1897
- Tychius flavipes Blanchard, E. in Gay, 1851
- Tychius flavus Becker, 1864
- Tychius florieni Pic, 1919
- Tychius focarilei Solari, 1950
- Tychius franzi Caldara, 1986
- Tychius frater Caldara & Karasyov, 1997
- Tychius fraterculus Casey, 1910
- Tychius fremuthi Caldara, 1990
- Tychius freudei Hoffmann, 1964
- Tychius fulvescens Desbr. d. Loges, 1898
- Tychius funicularis Ch. Bris., 1862
- Tychius fuscipes Chevrolat, L.A.A., 1859
- Tychius gabrieli Penecke, 1927
- Tychius galloprovincialis Hustache, 1924
- Tychius gambiensis Caldara, 2013
- Tychius genistae Boheman, 1843
- Tychius genistaecola Chevrolat, L.A.A., 1866
- Tychius gentilis Rottenb., 1871
- Tychius gibbipennis Caldara & Korotyaev, 1996
- Tychius gibbosus Caldara, 1989
- Tychius gillerforsi Caldara & Korotyaev, 1996
- Tychius ginsuji Kono, 1930
- Tychius glaucus Desbr. d. Loges, 1908
- Tychius globithorax Desbr. d. Loges, 1873
- Tychius glycyrrhizae Becker, 1864
- Tychius goliathus Karasjov, 1993
- Tychius gossypii Marshall, 1914
- Tychius gracilipes Tournier, H.,
- Tychius gracilitubus Caldara, 1986
- Tychius graecus Kiesenwetter, H. von, 1864
- Tychius grandicollis Desbr. d. Loges, 1873
- Tychius grenieri Ch. Bris., 1861
- Tychius griseus Petri, 1915
- Tychius grypus Casey, 1910
- Tychius haematocephalus Gyllenhal, 1835
- Tychius haematopus Gyllenhal, 1835
- Tychius hauseri Faust, J., 1889
- Tychius hedysaricus Karasev, 1991
- Tychius helenae Caldara, 1989
- Tychius henoni Pic, 1917
- Tychius hesperis Casey, 1910
- Tychius heydeni Tournier, H., 1873
- Tychius hiekei Caldara, 1990
- Tychius hierosolymus Caldara, 1978
- Tychius hipponensis Desbr. d. Loges, 1908
- Tychius hirtellus Caldara, 1975
- Tychius hirtus Caldara, 1986
- Tychius hispidus Klima, A., 1936
- Tychius hoffmanni Tempère, 1957
- Tychius holdhausi Solari, 1932
- Tychius hordei Brullé, 1832
- Tychius horni Lea, 1910
- Tychius hovanus Hustache, 1920
- Tychius hueti Tournier, H., 1873
- Tychius humeralis Desbr. d. Loges, 1908
- Tychius humilis Caldara, 1989
- Tychius hypaetrus Tournier, H., 1873
- Tychius hyrtoides Caldara, 1986
- Tychius hystrix Casey, 1910
- Tychius icosiensis Peyerimhoff, 1919
- Tychius identipes Pic, 1925
- Tychius ifranensis Hustache, 1946
- Tychius imbellis Casey, 1910
- Tychius imbricatipennis Desbr. d. Loges, 1908
- Tychius imbricatus Klima, A., 1936
- Tychius immaculicollis Desbr. d. Loges, 1908
- Tychius immistus Hoffmann, 1957
- Tychius inapicalis Roubal, 1928
- Tychius indictus Hoffmann, 1957
- Tychius indigoferae Marshall, 1941
- Tychius indutus Desbr. d. Loges, 1898
- Tychius inermis Hoffmann, 1955
- Tychius ininterruptus Fuente, 1912
- Tychius inquinatus Gyllenhal, 1836
- Tychius insularis Klima, A., 1936
- Tychius intermixtus Hatch, 1972
- Tychius intramarginalis Hochhuth, 1847
- Tychius intrusus Faust, J., 1889
- Tychius irishi Caldara, 1989
- Tychius irkutensis Faust, J., 1893
- Tychius italicus Tournier, H., 1873
- Tychius iwatensis Kono, 1930
- Tychius jacqueti Pic, M., 1903
- Tychius joffrei Hoffmann, 1958
- Tychius junceus Schoenherr, 1825
- Tychius jungermannii Schoenherr, 1825
- Tychius junior Gozis, M des, 1886
- Tychius karakarlensis Bajtenov, 1974
- Tychius kaszabi Caldara, 1986
- Tychius khnzoriani Caldara, 1990
- Tychius kiesenwetteri Tournier, H., 1873
- Tychius kirbyi Waterhouse, 1862
- Tychius kirschi Faust, J., 1884
- Tychius klapperichi Voss, 1960
- Tychius kocheri Hustache, 1946
- Tychius konstantinovi Karasev & Caldara, 1992
- Tychius kostali Karasev & Caldara, 1992
- Tychius krausei Caldara, 1985
- Tychius kulzeri Penecke, 1934
- Tychius kuschakewitschi Faust, J., 1885
- Tychius languidus Casey, 1910
- Tychius lapathi Billberg, 1820
- Tychius lateralis Penecke, 1922
- Tychius laticollis Perris, E., 1864
- Tychius latiusculus Desbr. d. Loges, 1897
- Tychius latus Foerster, B., 1891
- Tychius lautus Gyllenhal, 1835
- Tychius leonhardi Penecke, 1922
- Tychius leprieuri Pic, M., 1904
- Tychius liljebladi Blatchley, 1916
- Tychius limosus Caldara, 1986
- Tychius lineatellus Stephens, 1831
- Tychius lineatulus Stephens, 1829
- Tychius lineellus LeConte, 1876
- Tychius lineolatus Desbr. d. Loges, 1873
- Tychius litigiosus Tournier, H., 1873
- Tychius lodosi Hoffmann, 1957
- Tychius longiclava Hustache, 1938
- Tychius longicollis Ch. Bris., 1862
- Tychius longicrus Desbr. d. Loges, 1893
- Tychius longinasus Desbr. d. Loges, 1907
- Tychius longitarsis Desbr. d. Loges, 1899
- Tychius longitubus Desbr. d. Loges, 1873
- Tychius longiusculus Desbr. d. Loges, 1898
- Tychius longulus Desbr. d. Loges, 1873
- Tychius longus Desbr. d. Loges, 1895
- Tychius lopatini Karasyov, 1991
- Tychius lopezi Hoffmann, 1957
- Tychius louwi Caldara, 1989
- Tychius luteus Billberg, 1820
- Tychius maculatus Gyllenhal, 1836
- Tychius maculifer Hatch, 1972
- Tychius maculifrons Pic, M., 1904
- Tychius maculosus Stierlin, W.G., 1894
- Tychius magnificus Pic, M., 1904
- Tychius magnithorax Caldara, 2010
- Tychius manderstjernai Heyden, C. von & Heyden, L. von., 1866
- Tychius mandschurica Voss, 1952
- Tychius massagetus Caldara, 1979
- Tychius mathieui Desbr. d. Loges, 1897
- Tychius maximus Petri, 1915
- Tychius maynei Hustache, A., 1924
- Tychius mazurai Formánek, 1923
- Tychius medicaginis Ch. Bris., 1863
- Tychius medius Desbr. d. Loges, 1895
- Tychius mekaliensis Pic, 1915
- Tychius mekalinensis Pic, M., 1915
- Tychius melarhynchus Chevrolat, L.A.A., 1859
- Tychius meliloti Norman, H. Joy, 1932 (sweet clover weevil)
- Tychius mesopotamicus Desbr. d. Loges, 1908
- Tychius metallescens Kolenati, F.A., 1859
- Tychius metallifer Hoffmann, 1958
- Tychius meyeri Pic, 1932
- Tychius mica Klima, A., 1936
- Tychius micaceus Rey, C., 1895
- Tychius mimeticus Caldara, 1989
- Tychius mimulus Penecke, 1926
- Tychius mimus Caldara, 1989
- Tychius minor Karasev & Caldara, 1992
- Tychius mitis Caldara, 1990
- Tychius mitratus Costa, 1862
- Tychius mixtus Desbrochers, J., 1873
- Tychius modestus Tournier, H., 1873
- Tychius modicus Caldara, 1986
- Tychius molestus Faust, J., 1891
- Tychius mollicomus Desbr. d. Loges, 1908
- Tychius mongolicus Csiki, E., 1901
- Tychius montanus Clark, 1971
- Tychius monticola Hustache, 1946
- Tychius morawitzi Becker, 1864
- Tychius moreanus Pic, 1917
- Tychius motschulskyi Tournier, H., 1873
- Tychius mozabitus Pic, M., 1898
- Tychius muellerarum Caldara, 2013
- Tychius nasutus Desbr. d. Loges, 1895
- Tychius naxiae Faust, J., 1889
- Tychius neapolitanus Tournier, H., 1873
- Tychius nefastus Dejean, 1836
- Tychius nemausensis Hoffmann, 1939
- Tychius nervosus Stephens, 1829
- Tychius nigricollis Chevrolat, L.A.A., 1859
- Tychius nigrirostris Waterhouse, 1862
- Tychius nimius Casey, 1910
- Tychius nitidior Rey, 1895
- Tychius nitidirostris Dejean, 1836
- Tychius normandi Hoffmann, 1952
- Tychius normandianus Hoffmann, 1957
- Tychius notabilis Karasyov, 1991
- Tychius obductus Hochhuth, I.H., 1851
- Tychius oberprieleri Caldara, 1989
- Tychius obesus Boheman, 1845
- Tychius oblongiusculus Desbr. d. Loges, 1908
- Tychius obscuripes Korotyaev in Ler (ed.), 1996
- Tychius obscurus Dejean, 1836
- Tychius ochraceus Tournier, H., 1873
- Tychius ochroceras Desbr. d. Loges, 1908
- Tychius oedemerus Penecke, 1936
- Tychius oertzeni Faust, J., 1889
- Tychius olcesei Tournier, H., 1873
- Tychius olcesianus Desbr. d. Loges, 1908
- Tychius ongaroi Caldara, 1996
- Tychius opaculus Desbr. d. Loges, 1898
- Tychius oppositus Desbr. d. Loges, 1908
- Tychius orbiculatus Hustache, 1946
- Tychius oriens Hoffmann, 1964
- Tychius oschianus Faust, J., 1885
- Tychius ovalis Roelofs, W., 1874
- Tychius paganettii Franz, 1942
- Tychius paleolatus Desbr. d. Loges, 1895
- Tychius paradoxus Karasyov, 1991
- Tychius parallelipennis Desbr. d. Loges, 1873
- Tychius parallelogrammus Desbr. d. Loges, 1893
- Tychius parallelus Pic, M., 1908
- Tychius pardalis Escalera, 1914
- Tychius parvula Stephens, J.F., 1831
- Tychius parvulus Stephens, 1831
- Tychius pauperculus Tournier, H., 1873
- Tychius pegaso
- Tychius pelissieri Pic, M., 1905
- Tychius pellitus Desbr. d. Loges, 1908
- Tychius peneckeanus Voss, 1960
- Tychius peneckei Franz, 1942
- Tychius perceptus Hoffmann, 1952
- Tychius pernix Gyllenhal, 1835
- Tychius perpendus Tournier, H., 1873
- Tychius perrinae Caldara, 1990
- Tychius peyerimhoffi Pic, 1917
- Tychius phalarus Clark, 1971
- Tychius phalerata Thoms., 1865
- Tychius phoenicius Franz, 1945
- Tychius picirostris (Fabricius, 1787) (clover seed weevil)
- Tychius pierrei Roudier, 1954
- Tychius piger Caldara, 1989
- Tychius pinguis Caldara, 1989
- Tychius pinnai Caldara & Fremuth, 1992
- Tychius placidus Caldara, 1989
- Tychius planus Caldara, 1989
- Tychius podlussanyi Caldara, 2010
- Tychius polylineatus Schoenherr, 1835
- Tychius ponticus Franz, 1942
- Tychius porcatus Casey, 1910
- Tychius posticus Gyllenhal, 1835
- Tychius potentillae Thoms., 1865
- Tychius poussielguei Hoffmann, 1955
- Tychius praescutellaris Caldara, 1990
- Tychius prasolovi Korotyaev, 1991
- Tychius primita Thoms., 1865
- Tychius probus Casey, 1910
- Tychius procerus Khnzorian, 1962
- Tychius prolixus Casey, 1892
- Tychius pseudogenistae Penecke, 1922
- Tychius pseudonigricollis Hoffmann, 1955
- Tychius pubicollis Petri, 1915
- Tychius puellus Casey, 1910
- Tychius pulcher Pic, 1925
- Tychius pumilus Reitter, E., 1916
- Tychius pungens Caldara, 1986
- Tychius pusillus Germar, 1842
- Tychius pygmaeus Brisout, H., 1860
- Tychius quadrimaculatus
- Tychius quinquelineatus Tournier, H., 1873
- Tychius quinquepunctatus (Linnaeus, C., 1758)
- Tychius radians Casey, 1910
- Tychius raffrayi Tournier, H., 1873
- Tychius rasus Desbr. d. Loges, 1908
- Tychius recognitus Hoffmann, 1952
- Tychius rectinasus Desbr. d. Loges, 1908
- Tychius reduncus Tournier, H., 1873
- Tychius reichei Faust, J., 1890
- Tychius reitterianus Penecke, K.A., 1922
- Tychius retusus Faust, J., 1885
- Tychius riedeli Caldara, 1997
- Tychius robertoi Karasjov, 1993
- Tychius rubanus Faust, J., 1885
- Tychius rubidendus Hoffmann, 1957
- Tychius ruficornis Tournier, H., 1873
- Tychius rufipennis Ch. Bris., 1862
- Tychius rufipes Tournier, H., 1873
- Tychius rufirostris Schoenherr, 1832
- Tychius rufofemoratus Pic, M., 1904
- Tychius rufotheivorus Caldara, 2013
- Tychius rufovittatus Faust, J., 1884
- Tychius rufulus Caldara, 1989
- Tychius rungsi Hoffmann, 1962
- Tychius russicus Desbr. d. Loges, 1908
- Tychius saetosipennis Caldara in Caldara, Colonnelli & Osella, 2009
- Tychius sanctus Pic, 1919
- Tychius sauricus Karasjov & Okrajko, 1998
- Tychius schatzmayri Pic, M., 1910
- Tychius schaumi Stierlin, W.G., 1866
- Tychius schneideri Schoenherr, 1835
- Tychius schuleri Tempère, 1970
- Tychius scythicus Karasjov, 1993
- Tychius seductor Desbr. d. Loges, 1908
- Tychius semiauratus Pic, M., 1904
- Tychius semiobliteratus Pic, M., 1902
- Tychius semisquamosus LeConte, 1876
- Tychius seniculus Desbr. d. Loges, 1908
- Tychius sericans Gozis, M des, 1886
- Tychius sericatus Desbr. d. Loges, 1897
- Tychius sericellus Faust, J., 1889
- Tychius sericeus Desbr. d. Loges, 1873
- Tychius seriepilosus Tournier, H., 1873
- Tychius setosus Cas., 1910
- Tychius sharpi Hoffmann, 1958
- Tychius sibinioides Klima, A., 1936
- Tychius siculellus Ragusa, E., 1908
- Tychius siculus Boheman, 1843
- Tychius similaris Tournier, H., 1873
- Tychius similis Tournier, H., 1873
- Tychius simillimus Desbr. d. Loges, 1908
- Tychius simplex Klima, A., 1936
- Tychius sisymbrii Billberg, 1820
- Tychius sogdianus Karasjov, 1993
- Tychius soltaui Casey, 1892
- Tychius sordidus LeConte, 1876
- Tychius sorex Gyllenhal, 1835
- Tychius sororius Clark, 1978
- Tychius sparsus Hustache, 1946
- Tychius sparsutus Schoenherr, 1835
- Tychius spartii Hoffmann, 1955
- Tychius spinicrus Desbr. d. Loges, 1895
- Tychius spiniger Desbr. d. Loges, 1908
- Tychius splendens Khnzorian, 1959
- Tychius squalidus Gyllenhal, 1835
- Tychius squamifer Boheman, 1843
- Tychius squamosus Gyllenhal, 1835
- Tychius squamulatus Gyllenhal, 1835
- Tychius stalsi Caldara, 2013
- Tychius starki Pic, M., 1902
- Tychius stepheni Schönherr, 1836
- Tychius stephensi Norman, H. Joy, 1932 (red clover seed weevil)
- Tychius stigma Billberg, 1820
- Tychius stigmosus Caldara, 1989
- Tychius stredai Penecke, 1926
- Tychius striatellus Ch. Bris., 1862
- Tychius striatulus Gyllenhal, 1835
- Tychius strigosus Reiche, L., 1858
- Tychius strumarius Gyllenhal, 1835
- Tychius suavis Ch. Bris., 1866
- Tychius subaequalis Caldara, 1989
- Tychius subdentatus Pic, 1923
- Tychius subellipticus Desbr. d. Loges, 1908
- Tychius subfasciatus Klima, A., 1936
- Tychius subflavicollis Hoffmann, 1963
- Tychius subimparis Voss, 1960
- Tychius sublineatus Gyllenhal, 1835
- Tychius subpaleatus Desbr. d. Loges, 1908
- Tychius subparallelus Pic, M., 1908
- Tychius subpilosus Desbr. d. Loges, 1908
- Tychius subsulcatus Tournier, H., 1873
- Tychius sulcatulus Klima, A., 1936
- Tychius sulphureus Faust, J., 1881
- Tychius sumericus Caldara & Korotyaev, 1996
- Tychius sutura-alba Desbr. d. Loges, 1898
- Tychius suturalis Megerle,
- Tychius suturatus Caldara, 1990
- Tychius suturellus Gyllenhal, 1835
- Tychius tacitus Casey, 1910
- Tychius tapirus Caldara, 1975
- Tychius taukumicus Caldara, 1990
- Tychius tectus LeConte, 1876
- Tychius tegulifer Caldara, 1996
- Tychius teluetensis Hustache, 1946
- Tychius temperei Hoffmann, 1955
- Tychius tenuirostris Tournier, H., 1873
- Tychius tenuitarsis Desbr. d. Loges, 1908
- Tychius terrosus Tournier, H., 1873
- Tychius tessellatus Tournier, H., 1873
- Tychius texanus Casey, 1910
- Tychius therondi Hustache, 1933
- Tychius thompsoni Caldara, 1990
- Tychius thoracicus Boheman, 1843
- Tychius tibialis Cristofori & Jan, 1832
- Tychius tigrinus Caldara, 1996
- Tychius tolensis Caldara, 1989
- Tychius tomentosus Stephens, 1829
- Tychius transversus Klima, A., 1936
- Tychius trapezithorax Desbr. d. Loges, 1908
- Tychius tridentinus Penecke, 1922
- Tychius trilineatus Pic, M., 1904
- Tychius trilobus Billberg, 1820
- Tychius trimacula Desbr. d. Loges, 1895
- Tychius trivialis Boheman, 1843
- Tychius trivirgatus Desbr. d. Loges, 1873
- Tychius tuberculirostris Hustache, 1946
- Tychius turanensis Faust, J., 1887
- Tychius turkestanicus Pic, M., 1904
- Tychius tychioides Caldara, 1990
- Tychius ucrainicus Caldara, 2010
- Tychius uncirostris Caldara, 1989
- Tychius uniformis Pic, 1925
- Tychius uralensis Pic, M., 1902
- Tychius varicolor Fairmaire, L., 1883
- Tychius variegatus Klima, A., 1936
- Tychius varius Caldara, 1989
- Tychius vauclusianus Hoffmann, 1936
- Tychius vaulogeri Pic, M., 1905
- Tychius venustus Stephens, 1829
- Tychius veridicus Caldara, 2010
- Tychius vernalis
- Tychius vernilis Casey, 1910
- Tychius versicolor Caldara, 1990
- Tychius vestitipennis Pic, 1925
- Tychius vicinus Roudier, 1954
- Tychius villosus Klima, A., 1936
- Tychius viscariae Thoms., 1865
- Tychius vittatus Dahl in Dejean, P.F.M.A., 1836
- Tychius vitticollis Blanchard, E. in Gay, 1851
- Tychius vossi Caldara, 1990
- Tychius weilli Caldara, 2010
- Tychius whiteheadi Caldara, 1990
- Tychius wiborgiae Caldara, 1989
- Tychius winkleri Caldara, 1986
- Tychius youngai Caldara, 1989
- Tychius zagrosianus Caldara, 2010
- Tychius zanoni Pic, 1928
