= Lignyodes adamanteus =

Scientific classification
- Kingdom: Animalia
- Phylum: Arthropoda
- Class: Insecta
- Order: Coleoptera
- Suborder: Polyphaga
- Infraorder: Cucujiformia
- Family: Curculionidae
- Tribe: Tychiini
- Subtribe: Lignyodina
- Genus: Lignyodes
- Species: L. adamanteus

Binomial name
- Lignyodes adamanteus (Clark, 1980)

Species of beetle

Lignyodes adamanteus is a species of ash seed weevils in the family Curculionidae.

== Distribution ==
It is found in North America.
