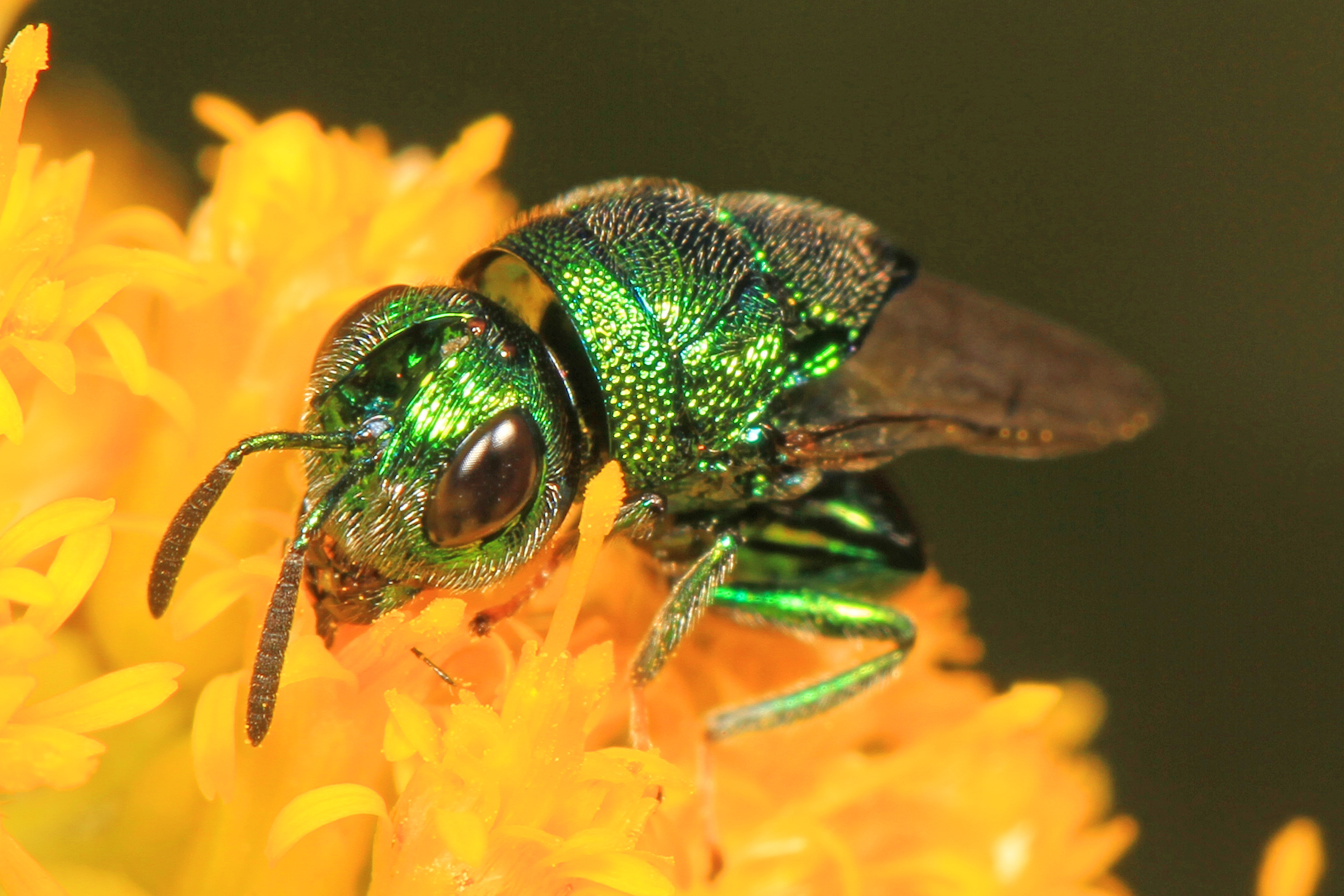

Scientific classification
- Kingdom: Animalia
- Phylum: Arthropoda
- Class: Insecta
- Order: Hymenoptera
- Family: Perilampidae
- Genus: Euperilampus
- Species: E. triangularis

Binomial name
- Euperilampus triangularis (Say, 1829)

= Euperilampus triangularis =

Species of wasp

Euperilampus triangularis is a species of chalcid wasp in the family Perilampidae.
