= Chrysolampus elegans =

Scientific classification
- Kingdom: Animalia
- Phylum: Arthropoda
- Class: Insecta
- Order: Hymenoptera
- Family: Chrysolampidae
- Genus: Chrysolampus
- Species: C. elegans

Binomial name
- Chrysolampus elegans Darling, 1986

Species of wasp

Chrysolampus elegans is a species of chalcid wasps with a Nearctic distribution.
