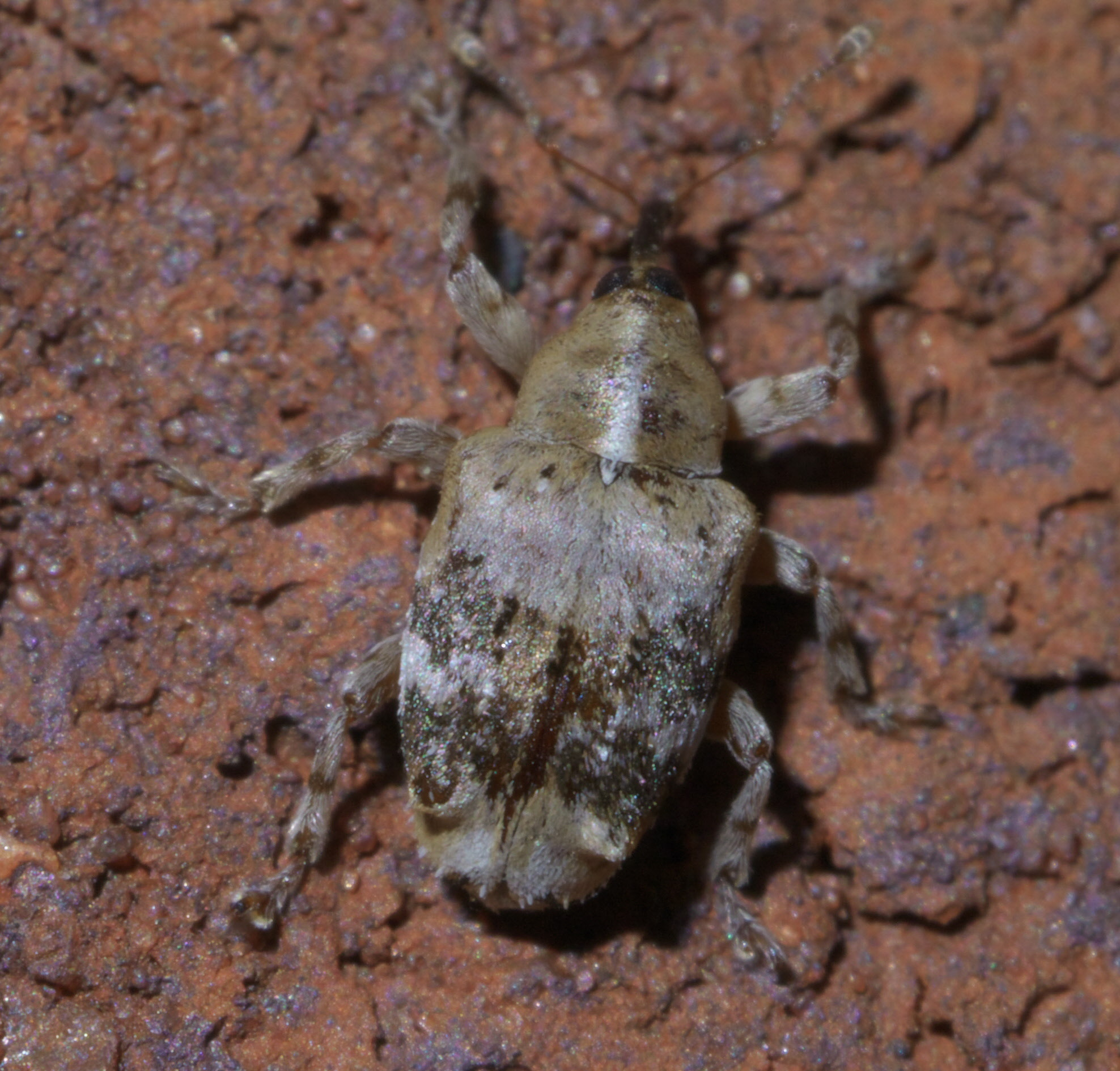
- Lignyodes pallidus

Scientific classification
- Domain: Eukaryota
- Kingdom: Animalia
- Phylum: Arthropoda
- Class: Insecta
- Order: Coleoptera
- Suborder: Polyphaga
- Infraorder: Cucujiformia
- Family: Curculionidae
- Subfamily: Curculioninae
- Tribe: Tychiini; Gistel, 1848

= Tychiini =

Tribe of beetles

Tychiini is a tribe of leguminous seed weevils in the family of beetles known as Curculionidae. There are about 5 genera and at least 30 described species in Tychiini.

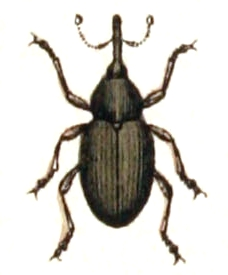
Tychius stephensi

== Genera ==
These five genera belong to the tribe Tychiini:

- Lignyodes Dejean, 1835^{i c g b} (ash seed weevils)
- Ochyromera Pascoe, 1874^{i c g b}
- Plocetes LeConte, 1876^{i c g b}
- Sibinia Germar, 1817^{i c g b}
- Tychius Germar, 1817^{i c g b}

Data sources: i = ITIS, c = Catalogue of Life, g = GBIF, b = Bugguide.net
