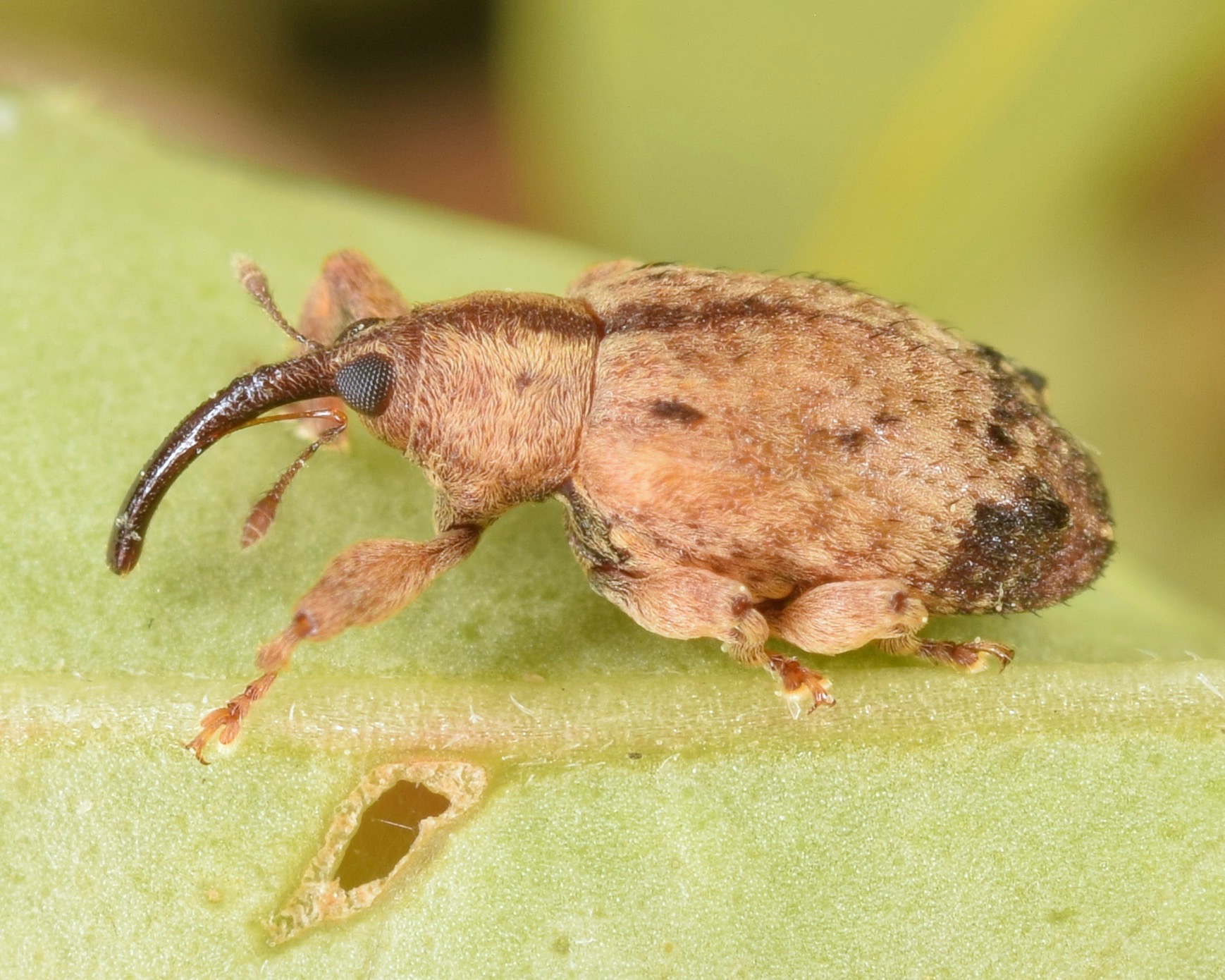

Scientific classification
- Domain: Eukaryota
- Kingdom: Animalia
- Phylum: Arthropoda
- Class: Insecta
- Order: Coleoptera
- Suborder: Polyphaga
- Infraorder: Cucujiformia
- Family: Curculionidae
- Genus: Ochyromera
- Species: O. ligustri

Binomial name
- Ochyromera ligustri Warner, 1961

= Ochyromera ligustri =

Species of beetle

Ochyromera ligustri, the ligustrum weevil, is a species of leguminous seed weevil in the beetle family Curculionidae. It is found in North America.
