= Lignyodes helvolus =

Scientific classification
- Kingdom: Animalia
- Phylum: Arthropoda
- Class: Insecta
- Order: Coleoptera
- Suborder: Polyphaga
- Infraorder: Cucujiformia
- Family: Curculionidae
- Genus: Lignyodes
- Species: L. helvolus

Binomial name
- Lignyodes helvolus (LeConte, 1876)

Synonyms
- Thysanocnemis balaninoides Schaeffer, 1908; Thysanocnemis caseyi Klima, 1934

Species of beetle

Lignyodes helvolus is a species of leguminous seed weevil in the beetle family Curculionidae. It is found in North America.
