= Sibinia transversa =

Scientific classification
- Kingdom: Animalia
- Phylum: Arthropoda
- Class: Insecta
- Order: Coleoptera
- Suborder: Polyphaga
- Infraorder: Cucujiformia
- Family: Curculionidae
- Genus: Sibinia
- Species: S. transversa

Binomial name
- Sibinia transversa (Casey, 1897)

Species of beetle

Sibinia transversa is a species that is classified under the family of Curculionidae ("snout and bark beetles"), in the suborder Polyphaga ("water, rove, scarab, long-horned, leaf and snout beetles"). It is found in North America (excluding the Mexican region).
