= Sibinia maculata =

Scientific classification
- Kingdom: Animalia
- Phylum: Arthropoda
- Class: Insecta
- Order: Coleoptera
- Suborder: Polyphaga
- Infraorder: Cucujiformia
- Family: Curculionidae
- Genus: Sibinia
- Species: S. maculata

Binomial name
- Sibinia maculata (LeConte, 1876)

Synonyms
- Paragoges maculatus LeConte, 1876; Tychius maculifer Hatch, 1971

Species of beetle

Sibinia maculata is a species of leguminous seed weevil in the beetle family Curculionidae.
