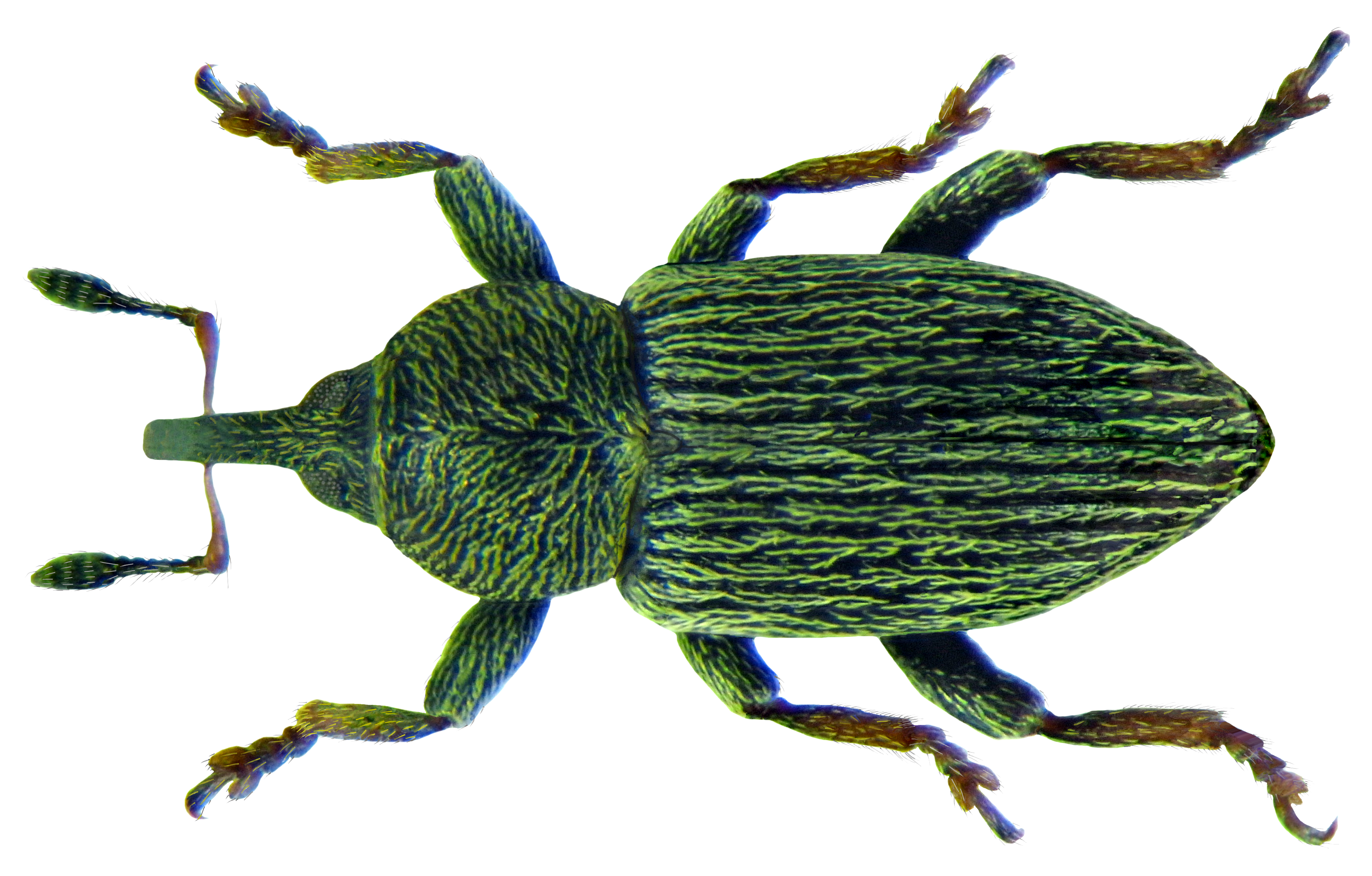
- Tychius picirostris 2,2 mm (2-2,3 mm)

Scientific classification
- Kingdom: Animalia
- Phylum: Arthropoda
- Clade: Pancrustacea
- Class: Insecta
- Order: Coleoptera
- Suborder: Polyphaga
- Infraorder: Cucujiformia
- Superfamily: Curculionoidea
- Family: Curculionidae
- Genus: Tychius
- Species: T. picirostris

Binomial name
- Tychius picirostris (Fabricius, 1787)

= Tychius picirostris =

Species of beetle

Tychius picirostris is a species of weevil native to Europe.
