= Plocetes ulmi =

Scientific classification
- Kingdom: Animalia
- Phylum: Arthropoda
- Class: Insecta
- Order: Coleoptera
- Suborder: Polyphaga
- Infraorder: Cucujiformia
- Family: Curculionidae
- Genus: Plocetes
- Species: P. ulmi

Binomial name
- Plocetes ulmi LeConte, 1876

Species of beetle

Plocetes ulmi is a species of leguminous seed weevil in the beetle family Curculionidae. It is found in North America.
