= Lignyodes baboquivariensis =

Scientific classification
- Domain: Eukaryota
- Kingdom: Animalia
- Phylum: Arthropoda
- Class: Insecta
- Order: Coleoptera
- Suborder: Polyphaga
- Infraorder: Cucujiformia
- Family: Curculionidae
- Genus: Lignyodes
- Species: L. baboquivariensis

Binomial name
- Lignyodes baboquivariensis (Sleeper, 1954)

Species of beetle

Lignyodes baboquivariensis is a species of leguminous seed weevil in the beetle family Curculionidae.
