= Tychius sordidus =

Scientific classification
- Kingdom: Animalia
- Phylum: Arthropoda
- Class: Insecta
- Order: Coleoptera
- Suborder: Polyphaga
- Infraorder: Cucujiformia
- Family: Curculionidae
- Genus: Tychius
- Species: T. sordidus

Binomial name
- Tychius sordidus LeConte, 1876

Synonyms
- Tychius carolinae Casey, 1910; Tychius nimius Casey, 1910; Tychius texanus Casey, 1910

Species of beetle

Tychius sordidus is a species of leguminous seed weevil in the beetle family Curculionidae. It is found in North America.
