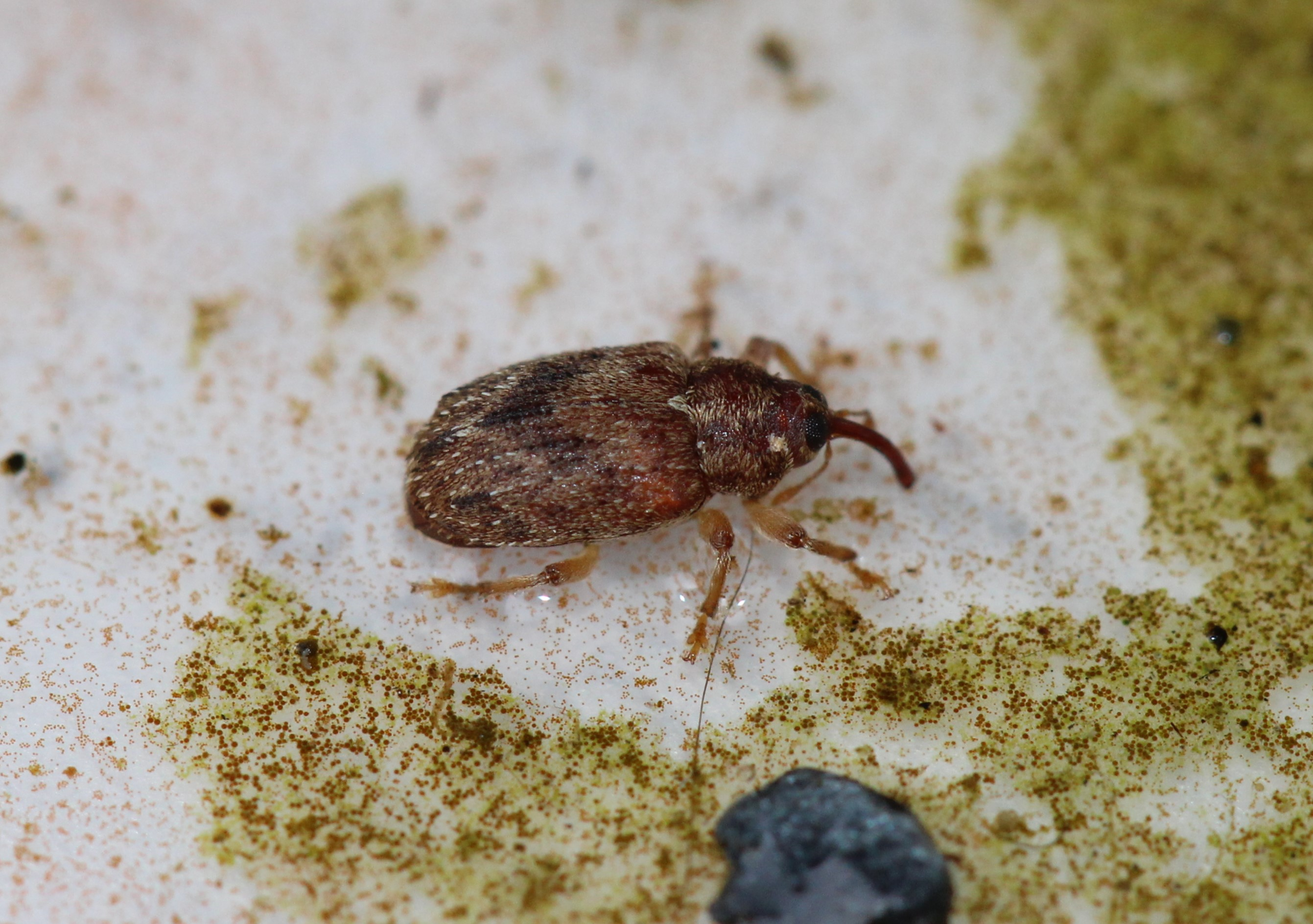

Scientific classification
- Domain: Eukaryota
- Kingdom: Animalia
- Phylum: Arthropoda
- Class: Insecta
- Order: Coleoptera
- Suborder: Polyphaga
- Infraorder: Cucujiformia
- Family: Curculionidae
- Genus: Lignyodes
- Species: L. bischoffi

Binomial name
- Lignyodes bischoffi (Blatchley, 1916)

Synonyms
- Lignyodes slovacicus Dieckmann, 1970

= Lignyodes bischoffi =

Species of beetle

Lignyodes bischoffi is a species of leguminous seed weevil in the beetle family Curculionidae.

Originally called Thysanocnemis bischoffi, it was named after Edwin A. Bischoff, a member of the New York Entomological Society.
