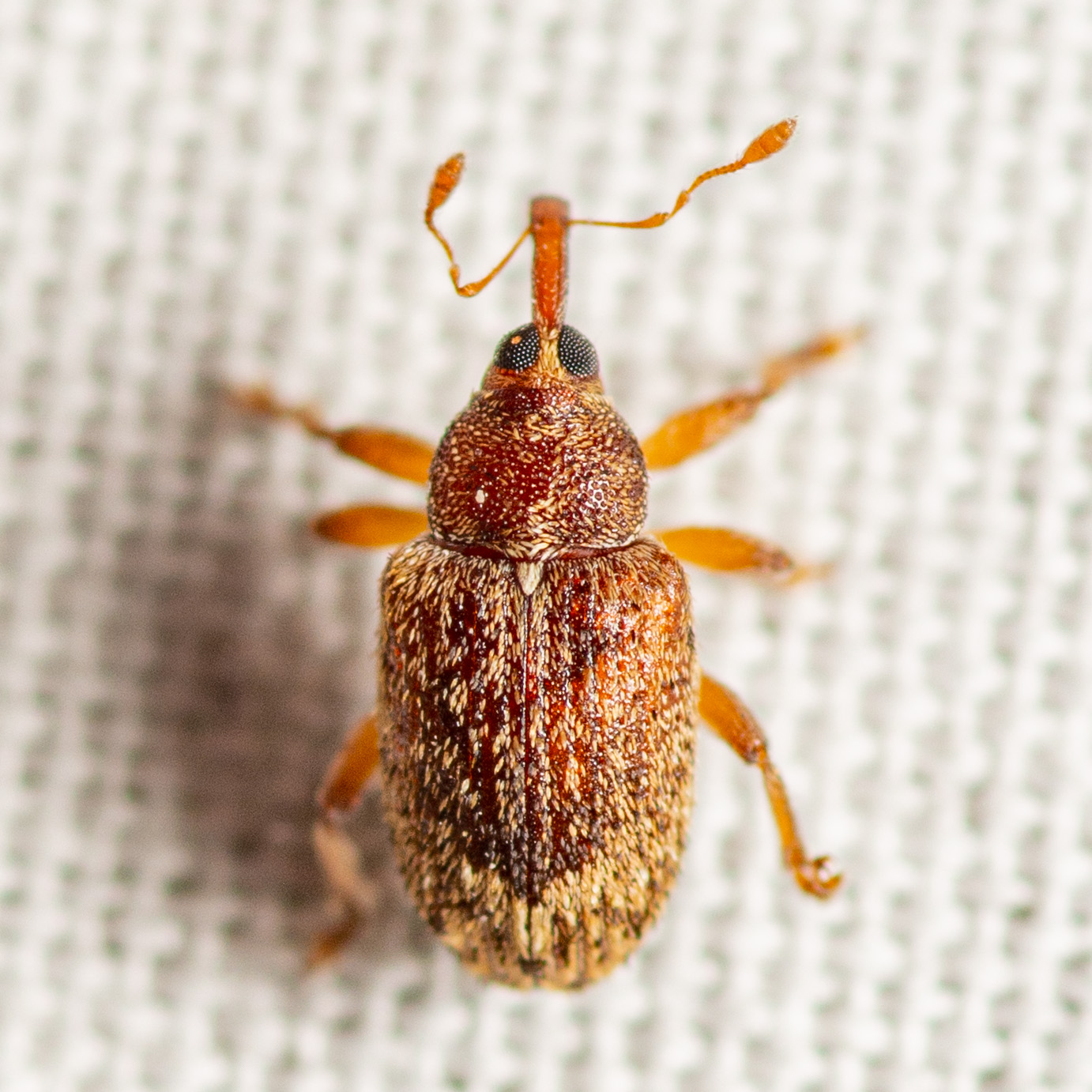
- Lignyodes horridulus

Scientific classification
- Kingdom: Animalia
- Phylum: Arthropoda
- Class: Insecta
- Order: Coleoptera
- Suborder: Polyphaga
- Infraorder: Cucujiformia
- Family: Curculionidae
- Genus: Lignyodes
- Species: L. horridulus

Binomial name
- Lignyodes horridulus (Casey, 1892)

Synonyms
- Thysanocnemis punctata Casey, 1910; Thysanocnemis squamiger Casey, 1892

= Lignyodes horridulus =

Species of beetle

Lignyodes horridulus, the ash seed weevil, is a species of leguminous seed weevil in the beetle family Curculionidae. It is found in North America.
