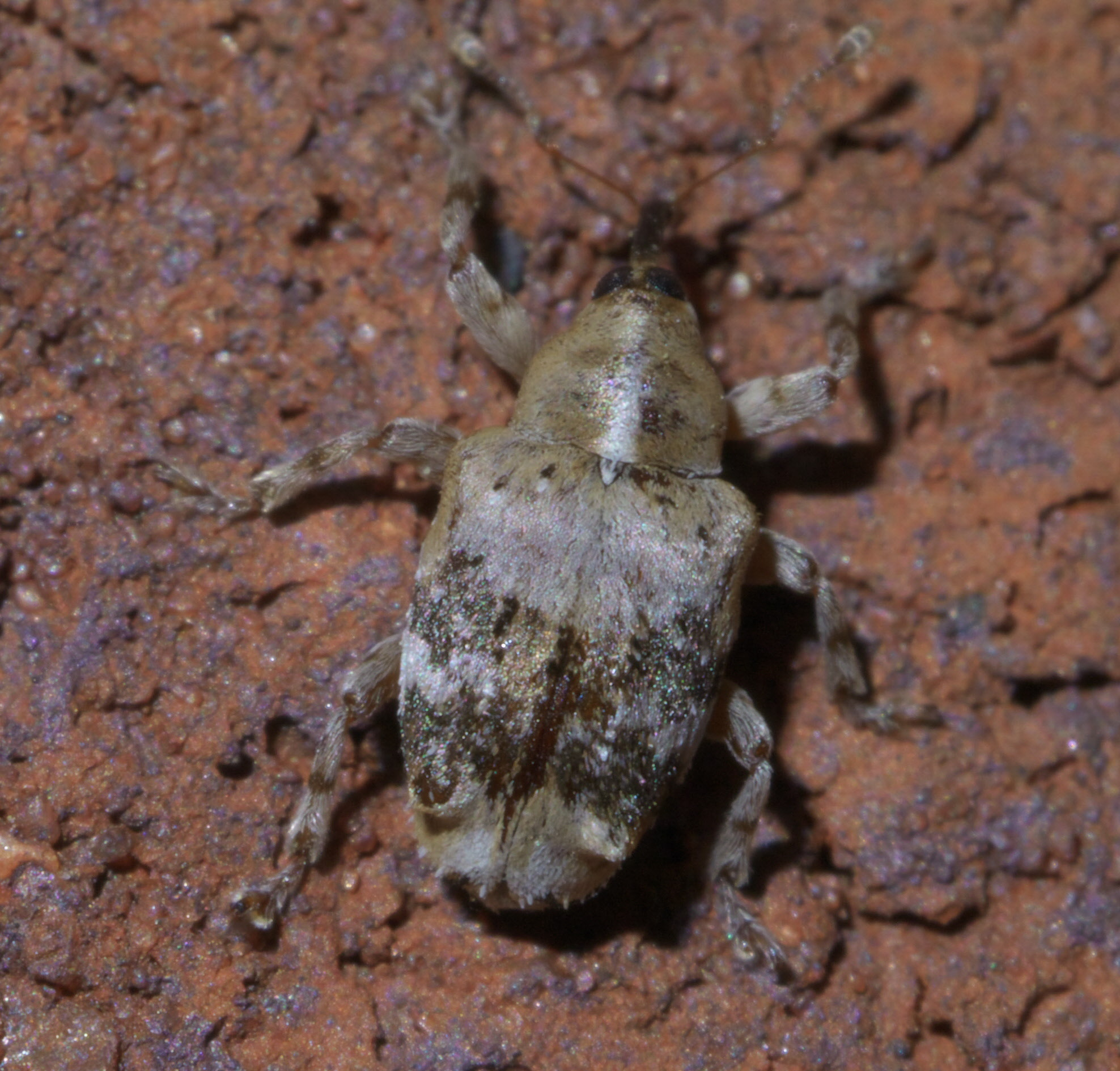
- Lignyodes pallidus

Scientific classification
- Domain: Eukaryota
- Kingdom: Animalia
- Phylum: Arthropoda
- Class: Insecta
- Order: Coleoptera
- Suborder: Polyphaga
- Infraorder: Cucujiformia
- Family: Curculionidae
- Tribe: Tychiini
- Subtribe: Lignyodina
- Genus: Lignyodes

= Lignyodes =

Genus of beetles

Lignyodes is a genus of ash seed weevils in the family Curculionidae. There are more than 30 described species in Lignyodes.

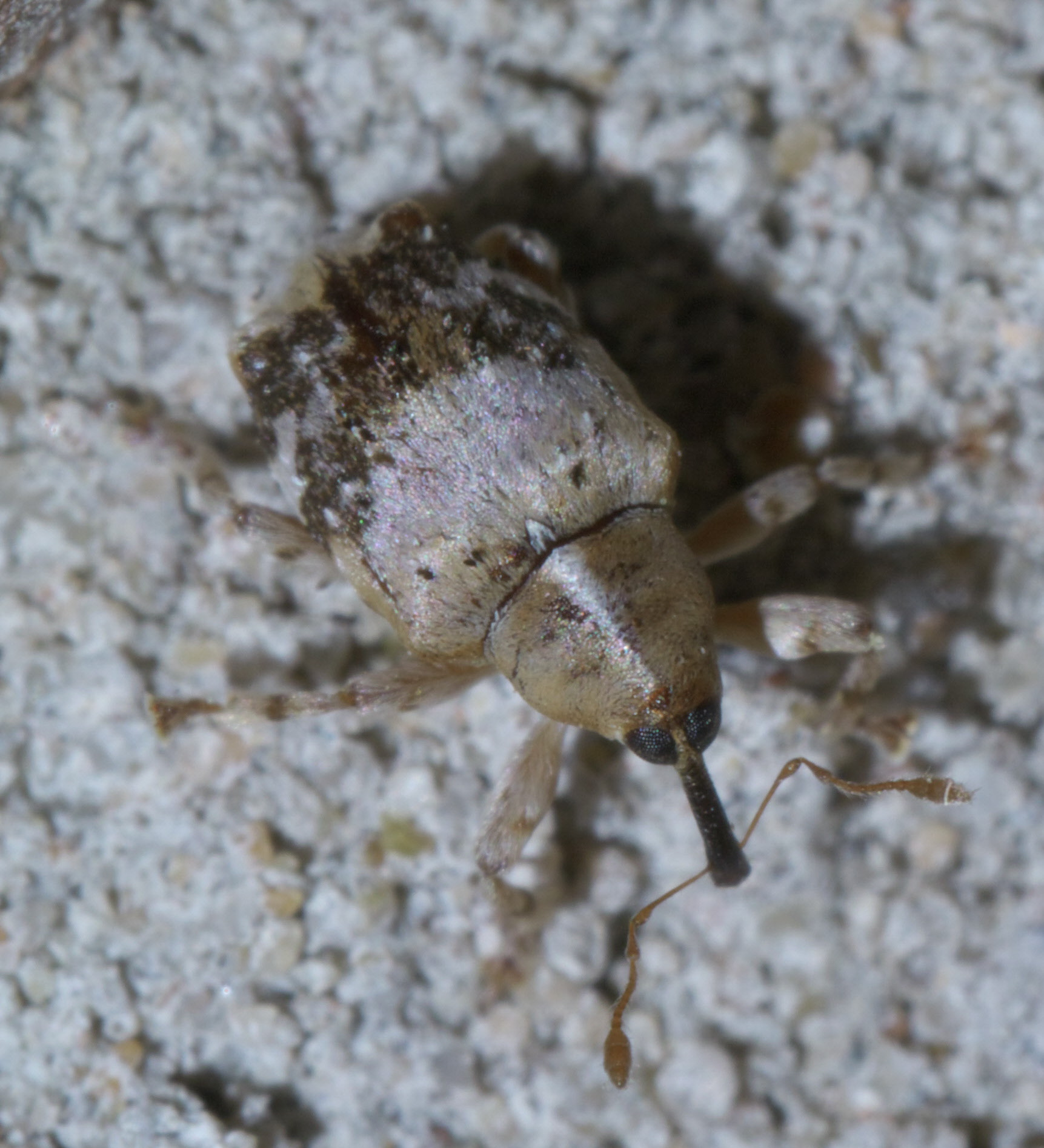
Lignyodes pallidus

== Species ==
These 34 species belong to the genus Lignyodes:

- Lignyodes adamanteus (Clark, 1980)
- Lignyodes apicalis Faust, J., 1893
- Lignyodes arizonensis
- Lignyodes arizonicus Clark, 1980
- Lignyodes auratus Clark, 1980
- Lignyodes autumnalis (Clark, 1981) (fall forestiera weevil)
- Lignyodes baboquivariensis (Sleeper, 1954)
- Lignyodes bicolor Schoenherr, 1833
- Lignyodes bischoffi (Blatchley, 1916)
- Lignyodes dieckmanni Clark & Lodos, 1982
- Lignyodes discoideus Hoffmann, 1958
- Lignyodes enucleator (Panzer & G.W.F., 1798)
- Lignyodes fraxini (LeConte, 1876)
- Lignyodes helvolus (LeConte, 1876)
- Lignyodes horridulus (Casey, 1892) (ash seed weevil)
- Lignyodes japonicus Kojima & Morimoto, 2003
- Lignyodes liberatum Hoffmann, A., 1929
- Lignyodes ligustricolus (Clark, 1980)
- Lignyodes longirostris Kirsch, T., 1875
- Lignyodes muerlei Ferrari, 1866
- Lignyodes oblique-fasciatus Fairmaire, L., 1875
- Lignyodes ocularis Clark, 1980
- Lignyodes olearis Clark, 1980
- Lignyodes pallidus (LeConte, 1876)
- Lignyodes ripleyi Anderson, 1999
- Lignyodes rudesquamosus Fairmaire, L., 1857
- Lignyodes rufescens Faust, J., 1893
- Lignyodes slovacicus Dieckmann, 1970
- Lignyodes subfasciatus Kirsch, T., 1875
- Lignyodes suturatus Fairmaire, L., 1859
- Lignyodes transversus (Clark, 1980)
- Lignyodes triophori Gyllenhal, 1843
- Lignyodes uniformis Desbr. d. Loges, 1894
- Lignyodes varius (LeConte, 1876)
