= Chrysolampus =

Scientific classification
- Kingdom: Animalia
- Phylum: Arthropoda
- Class: Insecta
- Order: Hymenoptera
- Family: Chrysolampidae
- Subfamily: Chrysolampinae
- Genus: Chrysolampus; Spinola 1811

Species
- See text

Genus of wasps

Chrysolampus is a genus of chalcid wasps.

== Species ==
- Chrysolampus aeneicornis Ratzeburg, 1852
- Chrysolampus aeneicorpus (Girault, 1915)
- Chrysolampus anguliventris Nees 1834
- Chrysolampus attenuatus Förster, 1841
- Chrysolampus brevicornis Förster, 1841
- Chrysolampus clypeatus Riek, 1966
- Chrysolampus coeruleovirens Förster, 1841
- Chrysolampus dentatus (Boucek, 1956)
- Chrysolampus dubius Förster, 1841
- Chrysolampus elegans Darling, 1986
- Chrysolampus ellipticus Förster, 1841
- Chrysolampus excellens Förster, 1841
- Chrysolampus fuscimanus Förster, 1841
- Chrysolampus gibbosus Förster, 1841
- Chrysolampus gilvipes Förster, 1841
- Chrysolampus granulatus Förster, 1841
- Chrysolampus hirtus Riek, 1966
- Chrysolampus improcerus Darling, 1986
- Chrysolampus indubitatus Förster, 1841
- Chrysolampus interruptus Förster, 1841
- Chrysolampus laevipetiolatus Förster, 1841
- Chrysolampus longigaster Riek, 1966
- Chrysolampus luridus Darling, 1986
- Chrysolampus niger Hedqvist, 1968
- Chrysolampus oblongiscutellum (Girault, 1922)
- Chrysolampus pachymerus Förster, 1841
- Chrysolampus pallitarsis Förster, 1841
- Chrysolampus picturatus Riek, 1966
- Chrysolampus prominens (Ruschka, 1924)
- Chrysolampus punctatus (Förster, 1859)
- Chrysolampus rufitarsis (Förster, 1859)
- Chrysolampus scapularis Ratzeburg, 1852
- Chrysolampus schwarzi Crawford, 1914
- Chrysolampus silvensis (Girault, 1929)
- Chrysolampus sisymbrii (Ashmead, 1896)
- Chrysolampus splendidulus (Spinola, 1808)
- Chrysolampus subcarinatus Förster, 1841
- Chrysolampus subsessilis Nees, 1834
- Chrysolampus tenuiscapus Förster, 1841
- Chrysolampus thenae (Walker 1848)
- Chrysolampus transversus Förster, 1841
- Chrysolampus verae (Nikol'skaya, 1954)
