= Sibinia sibinioides =

Scientific classification
- Kingdom: Animalia
- Phylum: Arthropoda
- Class: Insecta
- Order: Coleoptera
- Suborder: Polyphaga
- Infraorder: Cucujiformia
- Family: Curculionidae
- Genus: Sibinia
- Species: S. sibinioides

Binomial name
- Sibinia sibinioides (Casey, 1892)

Species of beetle

Sibinia sibinioides is a species of leguminous seed weevil in the beetle family Curculionidae. It is found in North America.
