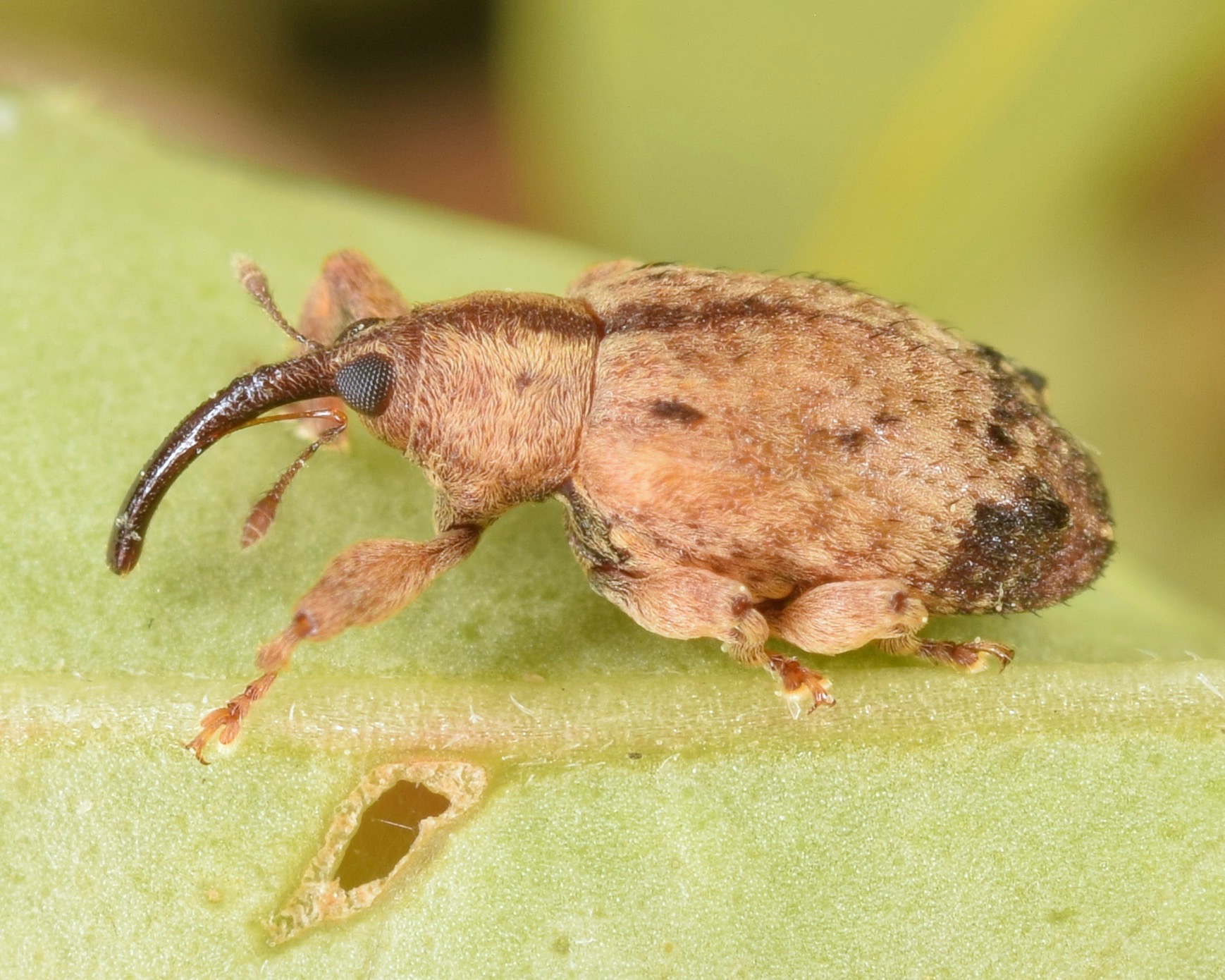
- Ochyromera Ligustri

Scientific classification
- Kingdom: Animalia
- Phylum: Arthropoda
- Class: Insecta
- Order: Coleoptera
- Suborder: Polyphaga
- Infraorder: Cucujiformia
- Family: Curculionidae
- Tribe: Tychiini
- Genus: Ochyromera; Pascoe, 1874

= Ochyromera =

Genus of beetles

Ochyromera is a genus of leguminous seed weevils in the beetle family Curculionidae. There are more than 30 described species in Ochyromera.

== Species ==
These 35 species belong to the genus Ochyromera:

- Ochyromera 4-maculata Voss, 1953
- Ochyromera artocarpi Marshall, 1926
- Ochyromera asperata Heller, 1936
- Ochyromera binotata Kojima & Morimoto, 1996
- Ochyromera binubilosa Marshall, 1926
- Ochyromera brevicornis Marshall, 1948
- Ochyromera bryanti Marshall, 1926
- Ochyromera cognata Marshall, 1948
- Ochyromera coronata Marshall, 1948
- Ochyromera decorata Heller, 1929
- Ochyromera dissimilis Pascoe & F.P., 1874
- Ochyromera distinguenda Voss, 1953
- Ochyromera fasciata Faust & J., 1888
- Ochyromera heteroclepta Faust & J., 1888
- Ochyromera hiramatsui Kojima & Morimoto, 1996
- Ochyromera hirsuta Kojima & Morimoto, 1996
- Ochyromera horikawai Kojima & Morimoto, 1996
- Ochyromera japonica Marshall, 1935
- Ochyromera kalshoveni Kojima, 2011
- Ochyromera keteleeriae Kojima, 2011
- Ochyromera ligustri Warner, 1961 (ligustrum weevil)
- Ochyromera miwai Kôno, 1939
- Ochyromera nipponica Kojima & Morimoto, 1996
- Ochyromera penicillatus Marshall & G.A.K., 1926
- Ochyromera pieridis Kojima & Morimoto, 1998
- Ochyromera posticalis Marshall, 1926
- Ochyromera rectirostris Kojima & Morimoto, 1998
- Ochyromera rufescens Pascoe & F.P., 1874
- Ochyromera ryukyuensis Kojima & Morimoto, 1996
- Ochyromera sericea Marshall, 1948
- Ochyromera signatella Voss, 1937
- Ochyromera sonepheti Kojima, 2011
- Ochyromera subcruciata Marshall, 1926
- Ochyromera subvittata Marshall, 1926
- Ochyromera suturalis Kojima & Morimoto, 1996
