= Lignyodes autumnalis =

Scientific classification
- Domain: Eukaryota
- Kingdom: Animalia
- Phylum: Arthropoda
- Class: Insecta
- Order: Coleoptera
- Suborder: Polyphaga
- Infraorder: Cucujiformia
- Family: Curculionidae
- Genus: Lignyodes
- Species: L. autumnalis

Binomial name
- Lignyodes autumnalis (Clark, 1981)

Species of beetle

Lignyodes autumnalis, the fall forestiera weevil, is a species of leguminous seed weevil in the beetle family Curculionidae.
