= Tychius tectus =

Scientific classification
- Kingdom: Animalia
- Phylum: Arthropoda
- Class: Insecta
- Order: Coleoptera
- Suborder: Polyphaga
- Infraorder: Cucujiformia
- Family: Curculionidae
- Genus: Tychius
- Species: T. tectus

Binomial name
- Tychius tectus LeConte, 1876

Synonyms
- Tychius facetus Faust, 1891; Tychius languidus Casey, 1910; Tychius mixtus Hatch, 1971

Species of beetle

Tychius tectus is a species of leguminous seed weevil in the family Curculionidae. It is found in North America.
