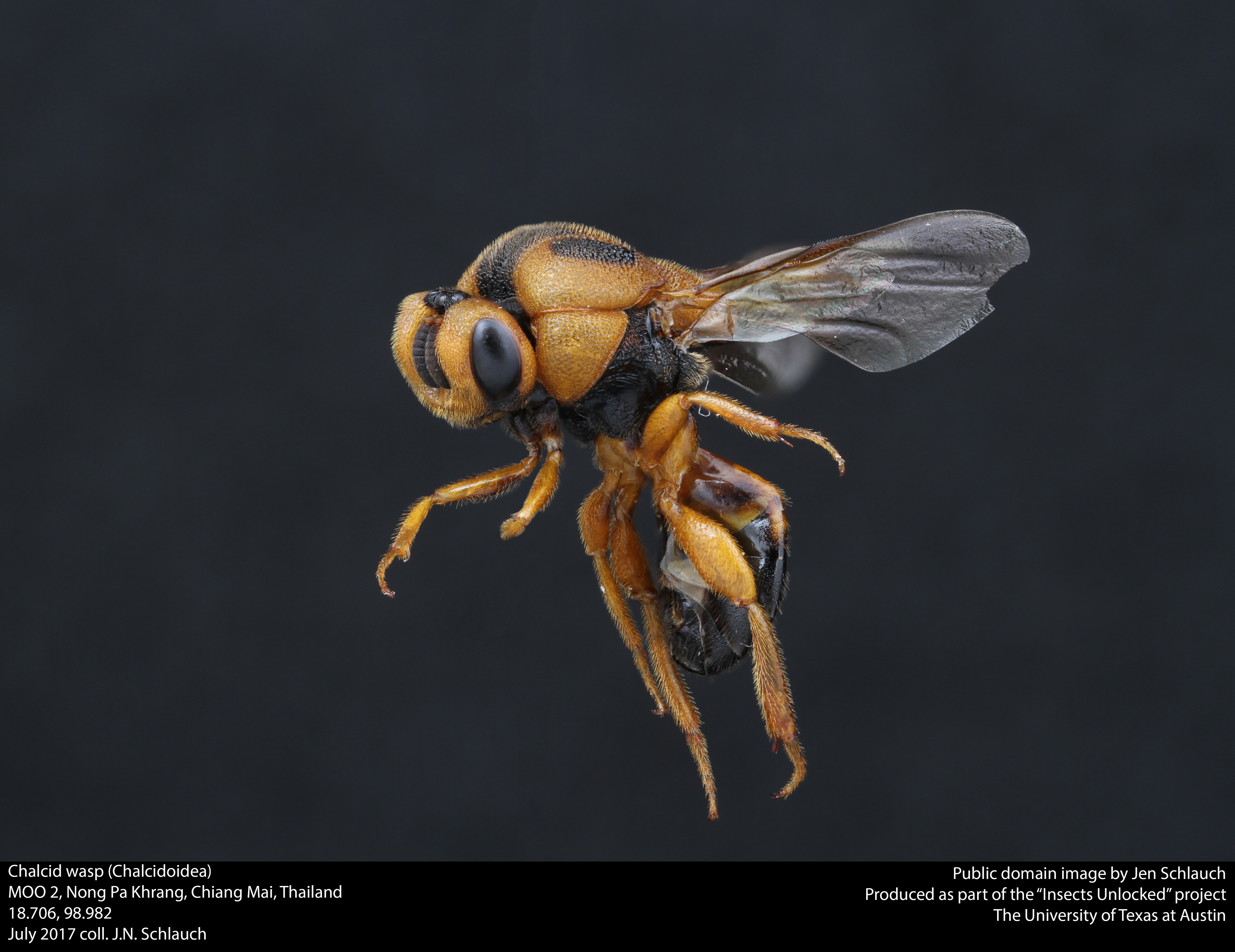
- Philomides sp. (Philomidinae)

Scientific classification
- Kingdom: Animalia
- Phylum: Arthropoda
- Clade: Pancrustacea
- Class: Insecta
- Order: Hymenoptera
- Superfamily: Chalcidoidea
- Family: Chrysolampidae

Subfamilies
- Chrysolampinae; Philomidinae

Diversity
- 2 subfamilies 9 genera

= Chrysolampidae =

Chrysolampidae Temporal range: Ypresian–Recent

Family of wasps

Chrysolampidae is a small family of parasitoids within the Chalcidoidea. The family is related to a clade that includes the Eucharitidae, Perilampidae and Eutrichosomatidae. This group of wasp families have first-instar larvae that are called "planidia". Adult females lay eggs on vegetation (often flowers) frequented by their host insects; after hatching, the planidia attach themselves to adults of the host, which then carries some of them to nests of the host. Here they parasitize the host larvae or pupae, before developing into winged adults.

== Subfamiles and genera ==
Chrysolampinae

- Austrotoxeuma (Australia and New Zealand)
- Brachyelatus (Australia)
- Chrysolampus (North America, Europe, Africa, Asia and Australia)
- Chrysomalla (Asia, Europe, North Africa, Western USA, and Australia)
- Elatomorpha (Turkmenistan, Uzbekistan, Turkey, Morocco)
- Parelatus (Australia)

Philomidinae

- Aperilampus (Afrotropics)
- Philomides (Afrotropics, southern Palearctic and Indomalaya)
- Vidlinus (Afrotropics)

== Distribution ==
The distribution of the Chrysolampinae includes steppe and Mediterranean regions in western North America, Europe, North Africa and Central Asia, mesic forests in Europe and Asia, and tropical forests in Australia and the Philippines. Philomidinae are found in a range of vegetation types in the Afrotropics, southern Palearctic and Indomalaya.

== Biology ==
Knowledge of the biology of the Chrysolampidae is limited: A few species of the Chrysolampinae are known to be parasitoids of beetles, including weevils of the genus Tychius and a pollen beetle Meligethes pedicularius. Aperilampus varians is a parasitoid of the pupa of Halictus africanus; other species of the Philomidinae are probably also parasitoids of ground-nesting bees.
