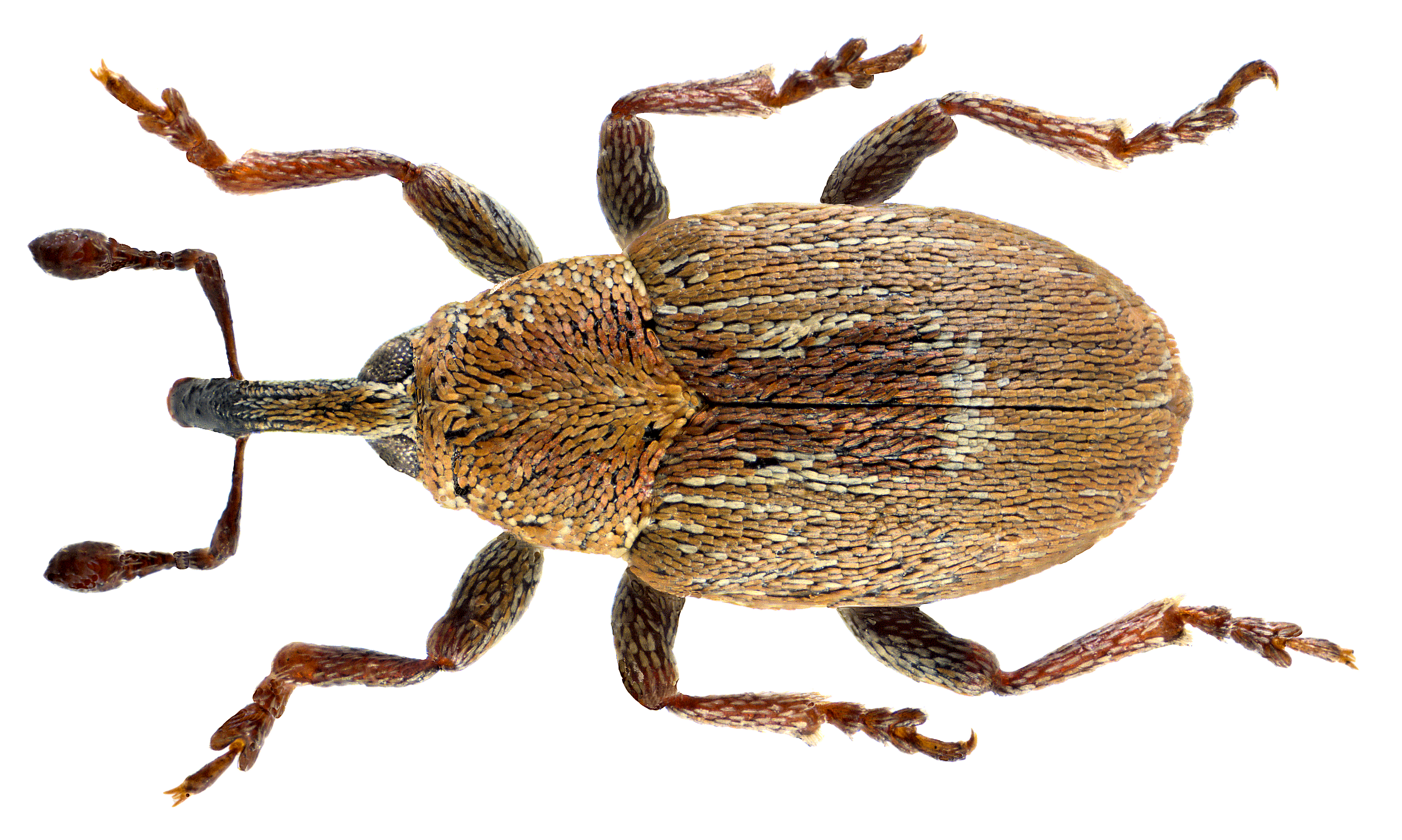
- Sibinia primita

Scientific classification
- Domain: Eukaryota
- Kingdom: Animalia
- Phylum: Arthropoda
- Class: Insecta
- Order: Coleoptera
- Suborder: Polyphaga
- Infraorder: Cucujiformia
- Family: Curculionidae
- Subfamily: Curculioninae
- Tribe: Tychiini
- Genus: Sibinia; Germar, 1817

Synonyms
- Paragoges LeConte, 1876

= Sibinia =

Genus of beetles

Sibinia is a genus of leguminous seed weevils in the family Curculionidae. There are at least 20 described species in Sibinia.

== Species ==
- Sibinia candidata Champion, 1903
- Sibinia caseyi Clark, 1978
- Sibinia errans (Casey, 1910)
- Sibinia fulva (LeConte, 1876)
- Sibinia hispida (Casey, 1892)
- Sibinia inermis (Casey, 1897) (huisache sibinia weevil)
- Sibinia lecontei Clark, 1978
- Sibinia maculata (LeConte, 1876)
- Sibinia mica (Casey, 1892)
- Sibinia ochreosa Casey, 1897
- Sibinia pallida (Schaeffer, 1908)
- Sibinia ruidula Clark, 1978
- Sibinia sellata
- Sibinia seminicola Clark, 1978
- Sibinia setosa (LeConte, 1876)
- Sibinia sibinioides (Casey, 1892)
- Sibinia simplex (Casey, 1892)
- Sibinia subelliptica (Desbrochers, 1873)
- Sibinia suturalis (Schaeffer, 1908)
- Sibinia tanneri Clark, 1978
- Sibinia texana (Pierce, 1908)
- Sibinia transversa (Casey, 1897)
- Sibinia triseriata Clark, 1978
- Sibinia variegata (Casey, 1892)
