= Tychius lineellus =

Scientific classification
- Kingdom: Animalia
- Phylum: Arthropoda
- Class: Insecta
- Order: Coleoptera
- Suborder: Polyphaga
- Infraorder: Cucujiformia
- Family: Curculionidae
- Genus: Tychius
- Species: T. lineellus

Binomial name
- Tychius lineellus LeConte, 1876

Synonyms
- Tychius dilectus Casey, 1910; Tychius hesperis Casey, 1910; Tychius probus Casey, 1910; Tychius radians Casey, 1910; Tychius tacitus Casey, 1910

Species of beetle

Tychius lineellus is a species of leguminous seed weevil in the beetle family Curculionidae. It is found in North America.
