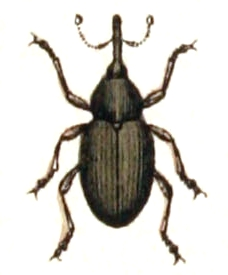

Scientific classification
- Domain: Eukaryota
- Kingdom: Animalia
- Phylum: Arthropoda
- Class: Insecta
- Order: Coleoptera
- Suborder: Polyphaga
- Infraorder: Cucujiformia
- Family: Curculionidae
- Genus: Tychius
- Species: T. stephensi

Binomial name
- Tychius stephensi Norman, H. Joy, 1932

= Tychius stephensi =

Species of beetle

Tychius stephensi, the red clover seed weevil, is a species of leguminous seed weevil in the family of beetles known as Curculionidae.
