= Sibinia setosa =

Scientific classification
- Kingdom: Animalia
- Phylum: Arthropoda
- Class: Insecta
- Order: Coleoptera
- Suborder: Polyphaga
- Infraorder: Cucujiformia
- Family: Curculionidae
- Genus: Sibinia
- Species: S. setosa

Binomial name
- Sibinia setosa (LeConte, 1876)

Synonyms
- Tychius albidus Schaeffer, 1908; Tychius atomus Casey, 1910; Tychius dulcis Casey, 1910; Tychius echinus Casey, 1910; Tychius fatuus Casey, 1910; Tychius fraterculus Casey, 1910; Tychius hystrix Casey, 1910; Tychius puellus Casey, 1910; Tychius subfasciatus Casey, 1892; Tychius sulcatulus Casey, 1897; Tychius vernilis Casey, 1910

Species of beetle

Sibinia setosa is a species of leguminous seed weevils in the family Curculionidae. It is found in North America.
