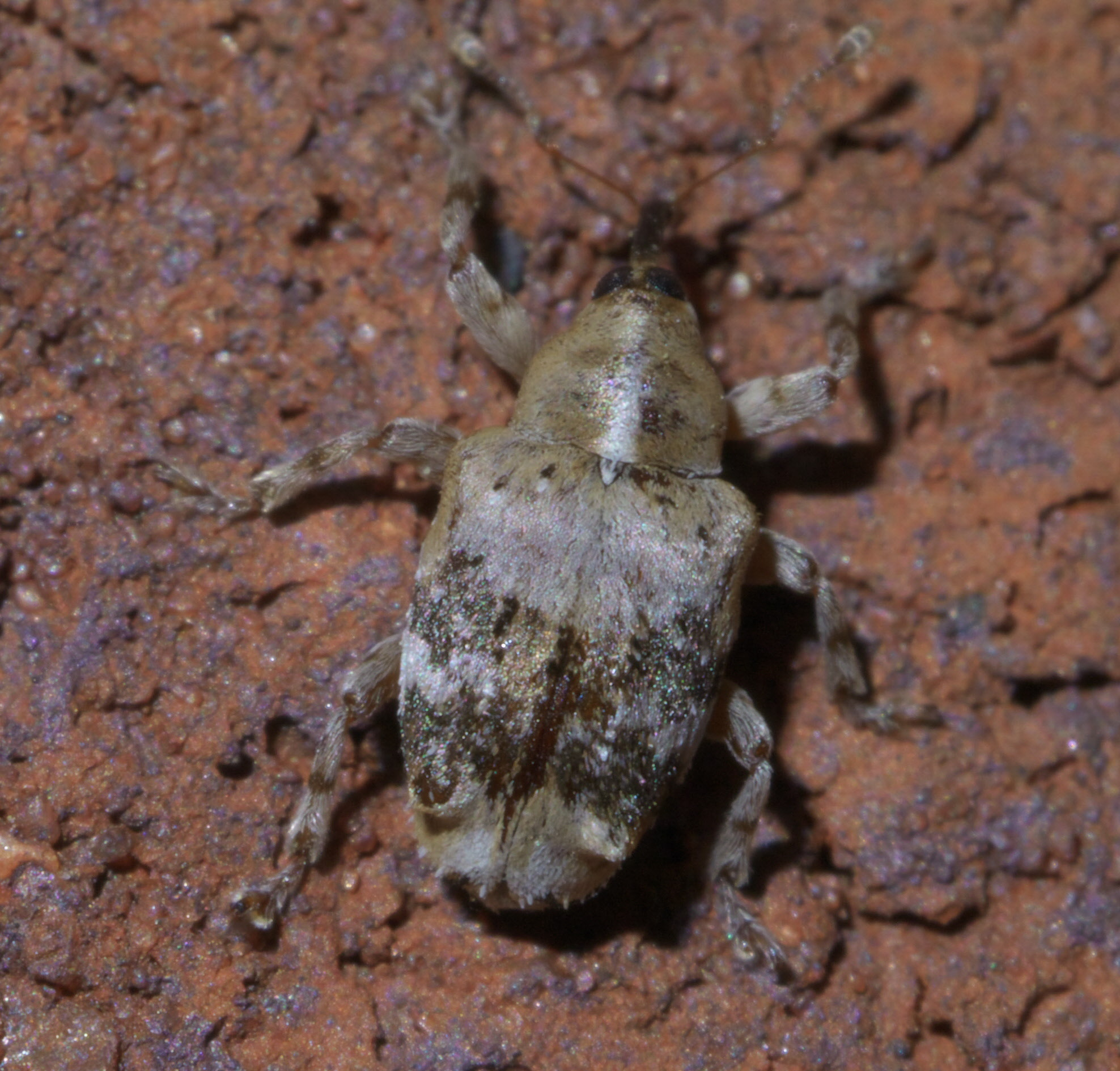

Scientific classification
- Kingdom: Animalia
- Phylum: Arthropoda
- Class: Insecta
- Order: Coleoptera
- Suborder: Polyphaga
- Infraorder: Cucujiformia
- Family: Curculionidae
- Genus: Lignyodes
- Species: L. pallidus

Binomial name
- Lignyodes pallidus (LeConte, 1876)

= Lignyodes pallidus =

Species of beetle

Lignyodes pallidus is a species of leguminous seed weevil in the beetle family Curculionidae.

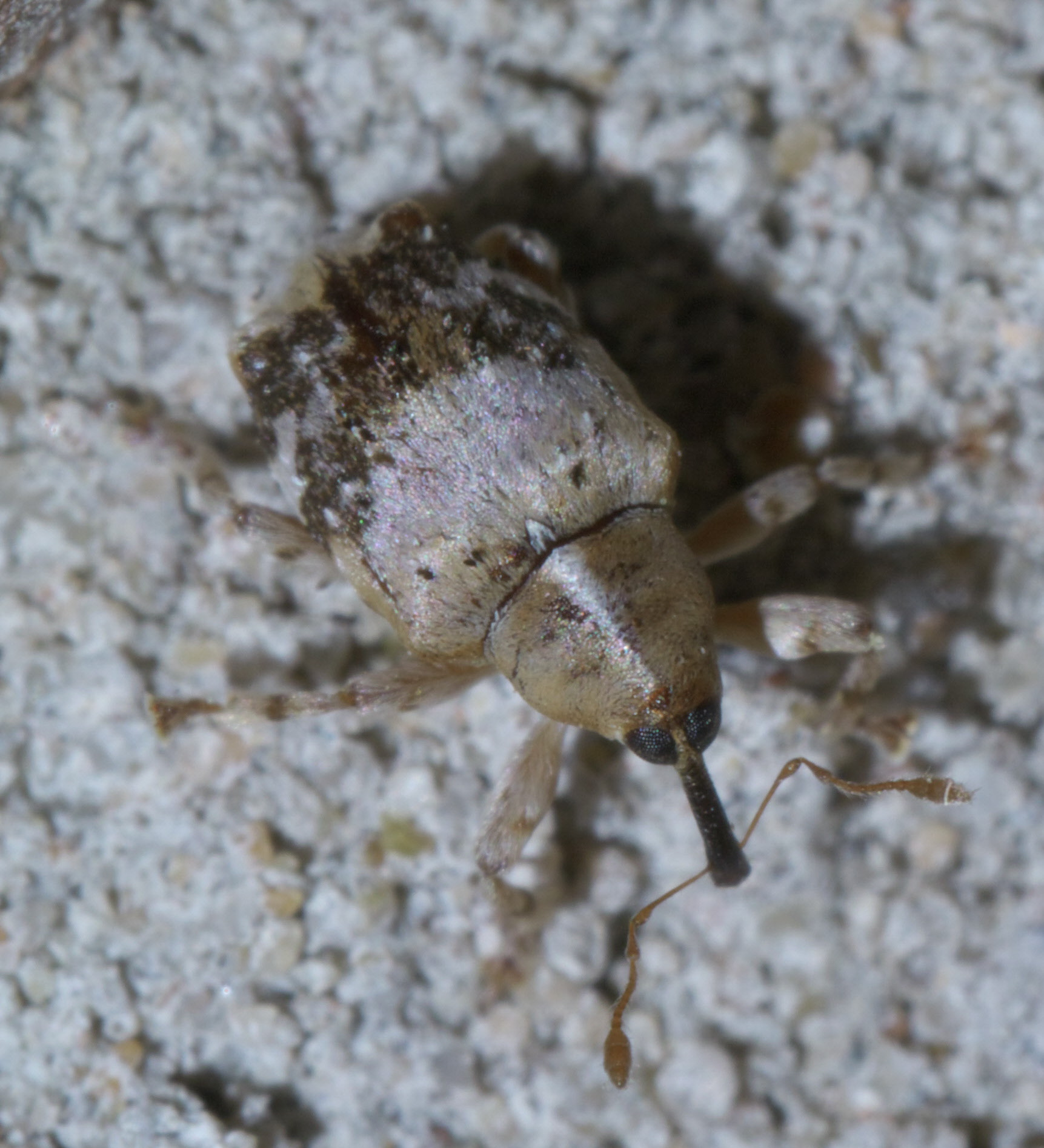
