= Tychius semisquamosus =

Scientific classification
- Kingdom: Animalia
- Phylum: Arthropoda
- Class: Insecta
- Order: Coleoptera
- Suborder: Polyphaga
- Infraorder: Cucujiformia
- Family: Curculionidae
- Genus: Tychius
- Species: T. semisquamosus

Binomial name
- Tychius semisquamosus LeConte, 1876

Synonyms
- Tychius intermixtus Hatch, 1971; Tychius lamellosus Casey, 1892; Tychius squamosus Hatch, 1971

Species of beetle

Tychius semisquamosus is a species of leguminous seed weevil in the beetle family Curculionidae. It is found in North America.
