= Lignyodes auratus =

Scientific classification
- Domain: Eukaryota
- Kingdom: Animalia
- Phylum: Arthropoda
- Class: Insecta
- Order: Coleoptera
- Suborder: Polyphaga
- Infraorder: Cucujiformia
- Family: Curculionidae
- Genus: Lignyodes
- Species: L. auratus

Binomial name
- Lignyodes auratus Clark, 1980

Species of beetle

Lignyodes auratus is a species of leguminous seed weevil in the beetle family Curculionidae. It is found in North America.
