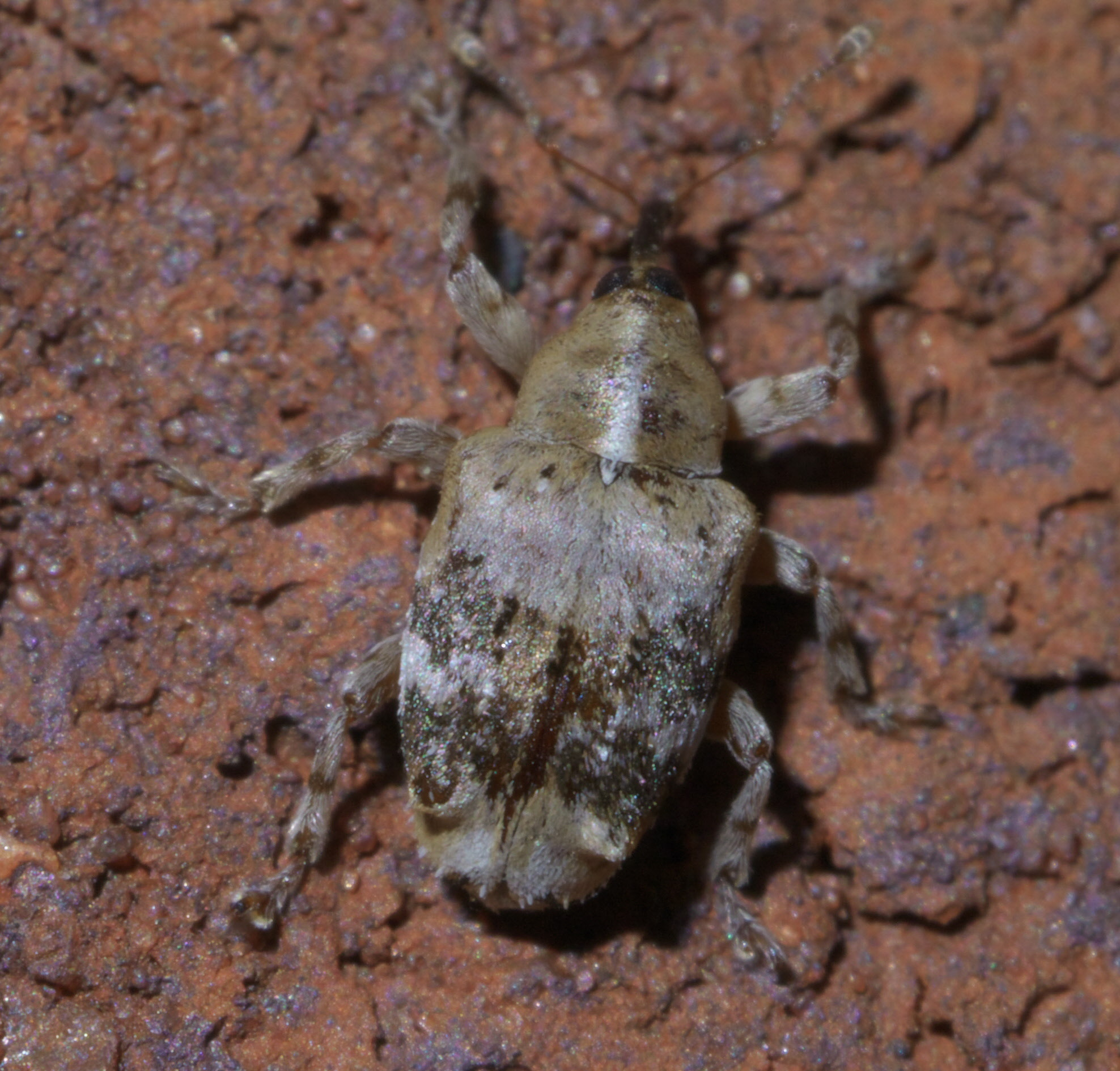
- Lignyodes pallidus

Scientific classification
- Domain: Eukaryota
- Kingdom: Animalia
- Phylum: Arthropoda
- Class: Insecta
- Order: Coleoptera
- Suborder: Polyphaga
- Infraorder: Cucujiformia
- Family: Curculionidae
- Tribe: Tychiini
- Subtribe: Lignyodina

= Lignyodina =

Subtribe of beetles

Lignyodina is a subtribe of leguminous seed weevils in the family of beetles known as Curculionidae. There are at least 2 genera and about 15 described species in Lignyodina.

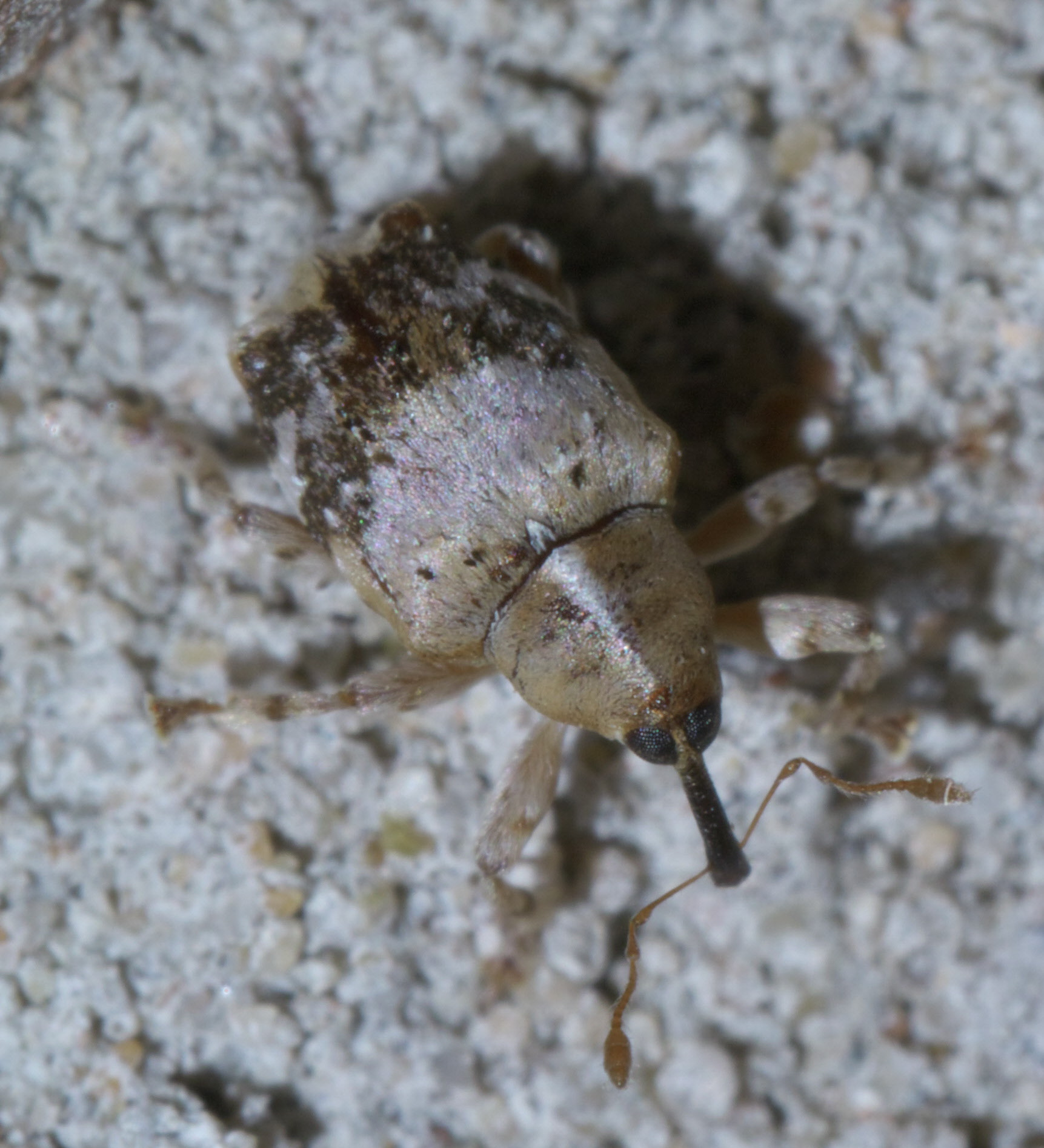
Lignyodes pallidus

== Genera ==
These two genera belong to the subtribe Lignyodina:

- Lignyodes Dejean, 1835^{i c g b} (ash seed weevils)
- Plocetes LeConte, 1876^{i c g b}

Data sources: i = ITIS, c = Catalogue of Life, g = GBIF, b = Bugguide.net
