= Sibinia subelliptica =

Scientific classification
- Domain: Eukaryota
- Kingdom: Animalia
- Phylum: Arthropoda
- Class: Insecta
- Order: Coleoptera
- Suborder: Polyphaga
- Infraorder: Cucujiformia
- Family: Curculionidae
- Genus: Sibinia
- Species: S. subelliptica

Binomial name
- Sibinia subelliptica (Desbrochers, 1873)

Synonyms
- Sibinia curtirostris Tournier, 1873; Sibinia fugax Fahraeus nec Germar 1824, 1843; Sibinia perrisi Tournier, 1873; Sibinia recteata Des Gozis, 1886

Species of beetle

Sibinia subelliptica is a species of acorn and nut weevils belonging to the family Curculionidae, subfamily Curculioninae.

This beetle is present in most of Europe, in the eastern Palearctic realm, in the Near East, and in North Africa.

Larvae feed on seeds, while pupation occurs into the soil. The adults grow up to 2–3 millimetres (0.079–0.118 in) long and can be encountered from May through August, especially on Asteraceae species and Dianthus carthusianorum. The colour of this small insect is brown, with longitudinal grooves on elytra.
