= Lignyodes fraxini =

Scientific classification
- Kingdom: Animalia
- Phylum: Arthropoda
- Class: Insecta
- Order: Coleoptera
- Suborder: Polyphaga
- Infraorder: Cucujiformia
- Family: Curculionidae
- Genus: Lignyodes
- Species: L. fraxini

Binomial name
- Lignyodes fraxini (LeConte, 1876)

Species of beetle

Lignyodes fraxini is a species of leguminous seed weevil in the beetle family Curculionidae. It is found in North America.
