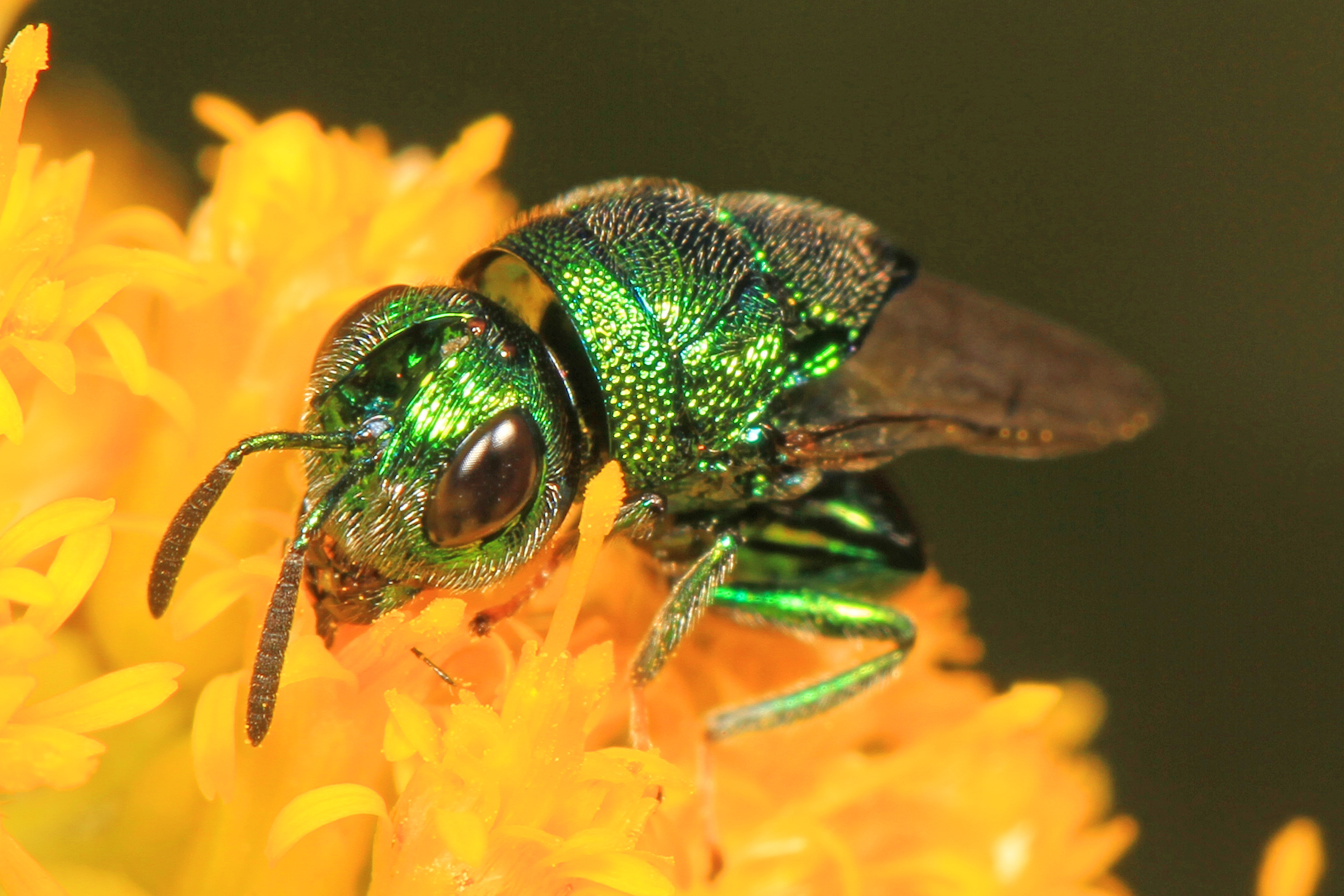
- Euperilampus triangularis

Scientific classification
- Kingdom: Animalia
- Phylum: Arthropoda
- Class: Insecta
- Order: Hymenoptera
- Family: Perilampidae
- Genus: Euperilampus; Walker, 1871

= Euperilampus =

Genus of wasps

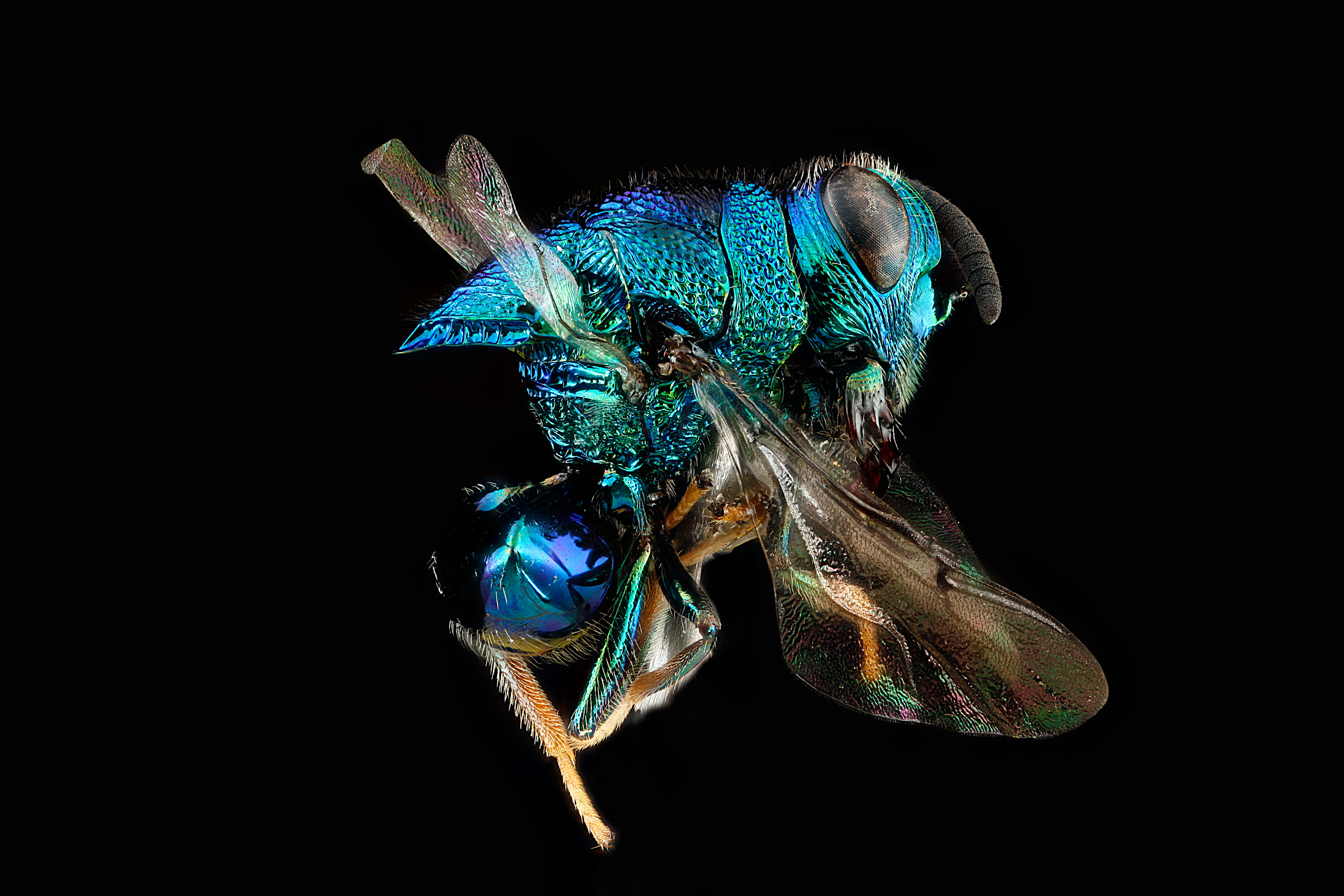
Euperilampus triangularis

Euperilampus is a genus of chalcid wasps in the family Perilampidae. There are about 18 described species in Euperilampus.

== Species ==
These 18 species belong to the genus Euperilampus:

- Euperilampus ameca Darling, 1983^{c g}
- Euperilampus aureicornis Darling, 1983^{c g}
- Euperilampus brasiliensis (Ashmead, 1904)^{c g}
- Euperilampus enigma Darling, 1983^{c g}
- Euperilampus gloriosus (Walker, 1862)^{c g}
- Euperilampus hymenopterae (Risbec, 1952)^{c g}
- Euperilampus iodes Darling, 1983^{c g}
- Euperilampus krombeini Burks, 1969^{c g}
- Euperilampus lepreos (Walker, 1846)^{c g}
- Euperilampus luteicrus Darling, 1983^{c g}
- Euperilampus magnus Darling, 1983^{c g}
- Euperilampus mediterraneus Boucek, 1972^{c g}
- Euperilampus scutellatus (Girault, 1915)^{c g}
- Euperilampus sinensis Boucek, 1978^{c g}
- Euperilampus solox Darling, 1983^{c g}
- Euperilampus spina Boucek, 1978^{c g}
- Euperilampus tanyglossa Darling, 1983^{c g}
- Euperilampus triangularis (Say, 1829)^{c g b}

Data sources: i = ITIS, c = Catalogue of Life, g = GBIF, b = Bugguide.net
