= Lignyodes varius =

Scientific classification
- Kingdom: Animalia
- Phylum: Arthropoda
- Class: Insecta
- Order: Coleoptera
- Suborder: Polyphaga
- Infraorder: Cucujiformia
- Family: Curculionidae
- Genus: Lignyodes
- Species: L. varius

Binomial name
- Lignyodes varius (LeConte, 1876)

Synonyms
- Thysanocnemis yavapaiensis Sleeper, 1954

Species of beetle

Lignyodes varius is a species of leguminous seed weevil in the beetle family Curculionidae.
