= Lignyodes ligustricolus =

Scientific classification
- Domain: Eukaryota
- Kingdom: Animalia
- Phylum: Arthropoda
- Class: Insecta
- Order: Coleoptera
- Suborder: Polyphaga
- Infraorder: Cucujiformia
- Family: Curculionidae
- Genus: Lignyodes
- Species: L. ligustricolus

Binomial name
- Lignyodes ligustricolus (Clark, 1980)

Species of beetle

Lignyodes ligustricolus is a species of leguminous seed weevil in the beetle family Curculionidae.
