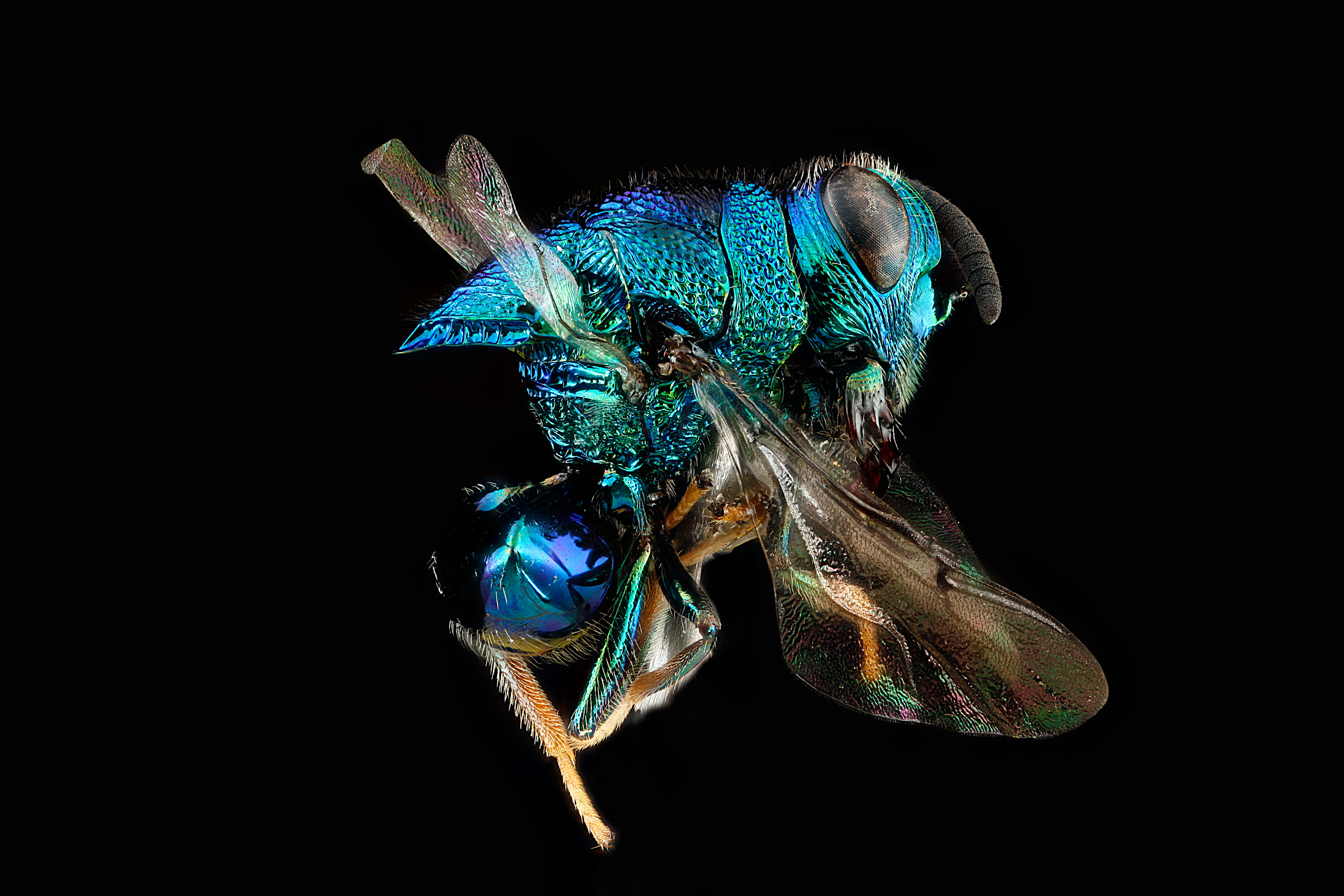
- Euperilampus triangularis

Scientific classification
- Kingdom: Animalia
- Phylum: Arthropoda
- Clade: Pancrustacea
- Class: Insecta
- Order: Hymenoptera
- Superfamily: Chalcidoidea
- Family: Perilampidae; Latreille, 1809

Subfamilies
- Perilampinae

Diversity
- 1 subfamily

= Perilampidae =

Perilampidae Temporal range: Ypresian–Recent

Family of wasps

The Perilampidae are a small family within the Chalcidoidea, composed mostly of hyperparasitoids. The family is closely related to the Eucharitidae, Chrysolampidae, and Eutrichosomatidae. As presently defined, six genera are described worldwide. They are often brilliantly metallic (especially blue or green), with robust mesosomae and a small, triangular metasomae. They are generally very strongly sculptured. The prothorax is typically very broad and disc-like, and the labrum is multidigitate, a feature shared with the Eucharitidae.

A feature shared by the Eucharitidae, Perilampidae, Chrysolampidae, and Eutrichosomatidae is that the first-instar larvae (called "planidia") are responsible for gaining access to the host, rather than the egg-laying females. Those species which are hyperparasitoids burrow into a secondary host's body and seek out endoparasitoid larvae, such as tachinid flies or ichneumonoid wasps, and attack them.

== Genera ==
These genera belong to the family Perilampidae:

- Burksilampus Boucek, 1978^{c g}
- Euperilampus Walker, 1871^{c g b}
- Krombeinius Boucek, 1978^{c g}
- Monacon Waterston, 1922^{c g}
- Perilampus Latreille, 1809^{i c g b}
- Steffanolampus Peck, 1974^{c g}

Data sources: i = ITIS, c = Catalogue of Life, g = GBIF, b = Bugguide.net

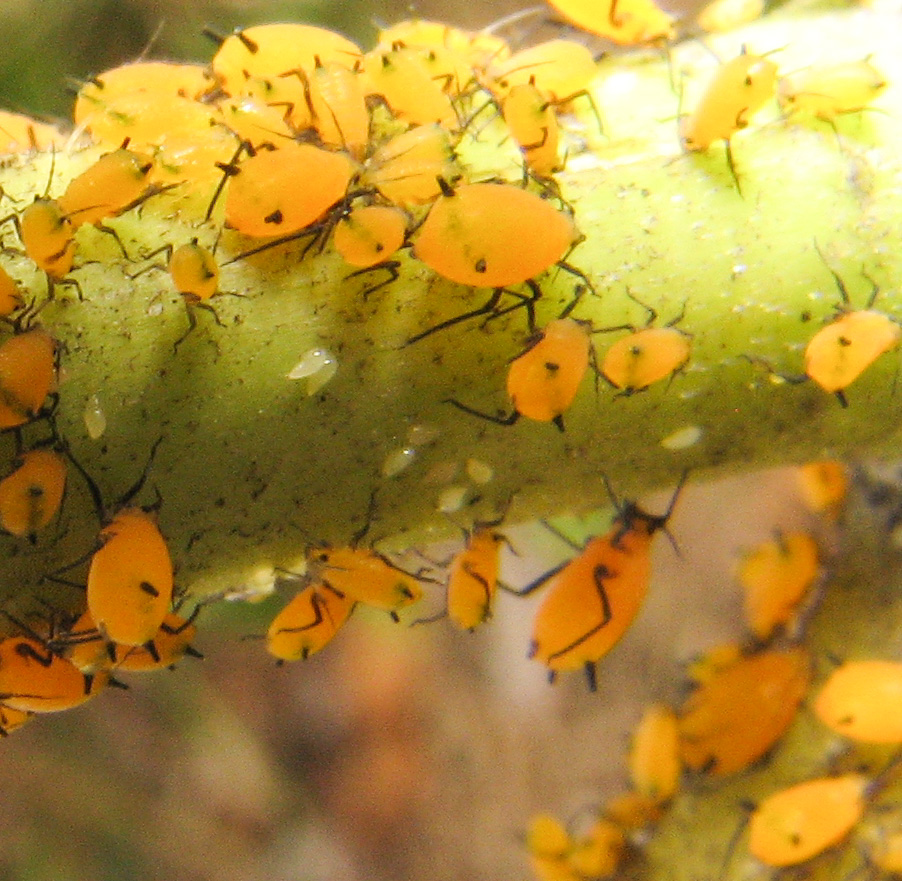
Perilampidae larvae surrounded by Aphis nerii on Asclepias syriaca
