= Plocetes =

Scientific classification
- Kingdom: Animalia
- Phylum: Arthropoda
- Class: Insecta
- Order: Coleoptera
- Suborder: Polyphaga
- Infraorder: Cucujiformia
- Family: Curculionidae
- Subtribe: Lignyodina
- Genus: Plocetes; LeConte, 1876

Genus of beetles

Plocetes is a genus of leguminous seed weevils in the beetle family Curculionidae. There are more than 60 described species in Plocetes.

== Species ==
These 68 species belong to the genus Plocetes:

- Plocetes acalyptoides (Hustache, 1930)
- Plocetes agminalis Clark, 1982
- Plocetes ancylus Clark, 1983
- Plocetes annulifer Clark, 1982
- Plocetes apicalis Clark, 1982
- Plocetes apparitio Clark, 1982
- Plocetes appendiculatus Clark, 1982
- Plocetes auriculatus Clark, 1982
- Plocetes avertifer Clark, 1982
- Plocetes bahamensis (Casey, 1910)
- Plocetes beluosus Clark, 1982
- Plocetes bicinctus Clark, 1982
- Plocetes binarmentum Clark, 1982
- Plocetes brevis Clark, 1982
- Plocetes bursiger Clark, 1982
- Plocetes cassidula Clark, 1982
- Plocetes catenatus Clark, 1982
- Plocetes cerberus Clark, 1982
- Plocetes clarki Anderson, 1991
- Plocetes cultriger Clark, 1982
- Plocetes denticulatus Clark, 1982
- Plocetes dufaui (Hustache, 1930)
- Plocetes dumosus Clark, 1982
- Plocetes empusa Clark, 1982
- Plocetes exclamationis Clark, 1982
- Plocetes falconiger Clark, 1982
- Plocetes faunus Clark, 1982
- Plocetes folliculus Clark, 1982
- Plocetes forcipiger Clark, 1982
- Plocetes geminus Clark, 1982
- Plocetes hamifer Clark, 1982
- Plocetes hebetatus Clark, 1983
- Plocetes incilatus Clark, 1983
- Plocetes infundibulum Clark, 1982
- Plocetes longirostris Clark, 1982
- Plocetes magnarmentum Clark, 1982
- Plocetes maniculatus Clark, 1982
- Plocetes maniola Clark, 1982
- Plocetes mergifer Clark, 1982
- Plocetes minor Clark, 1982
- Plocetes multidentatus Clark, 1982
- Plocetes narniensis Clark, 1982
- Plocetes obscurus Clark, 1982
- Plocetes ornatus Clark, 1982
- Plocetes parvidens Clark, 1982
- Plocetes pecusculum Clark, 1982
- Plocetes pegasus Clark, 1982
- Plocetes pilatus Clark, 1982
- Plocetes porosus Clark, 1982
- Plocetes pusillus Clark, 1982
- Plocetes rufescens Clark, 1982
- Plocetes rutrifer Clark, 1982
- Plocetes sacculifer Clark, 1982
- Plocetes seminiger Clark, 1982
- Plocetes senarius Clark, 1982
- Plocetes seriatus Clark, 1982
- Plocetes simulacrifer Clark, 1982
- Plocetes singularipes Clark, 1982
- Plocetes subfasciatus Clark, 1982
- Plocetes suturalis Clark, 1982
- Plocetes ulmi LeConte, 1876
- Plocetes unicornis Clark, 1982
- Plocetes uniguttatus Clark, 1982
- Plocetes urceus Clark, 1982
- Plocetes utriculifer Clark, 1982
- Plocetes velatus Clark, 1983
- Plocetes versicolor Clark, 1982
- Plocetes zonatus Clark, 1982
