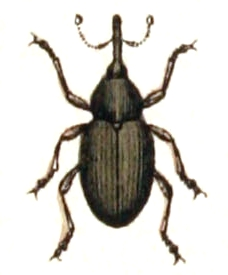
- Tychius stephensi

Scientific classification
- Domain: Eukaryota
- Kingdom: Animalia
- Phylum: Arthropoda
- Class: Insecta
- Order: Coleoptera
- Suborder: Polyphaga
- Infraorder: Cucujiformia
- Family: Curculionidae
- Genus: Tychius; Germar, 1817

= Tychius =

Genus of beetles

Tychius is a genus of leguminous seed weevils in the family Curculionidae. There are at least 630 described species in Tychius.

== See also ==
- List of Tychius species
