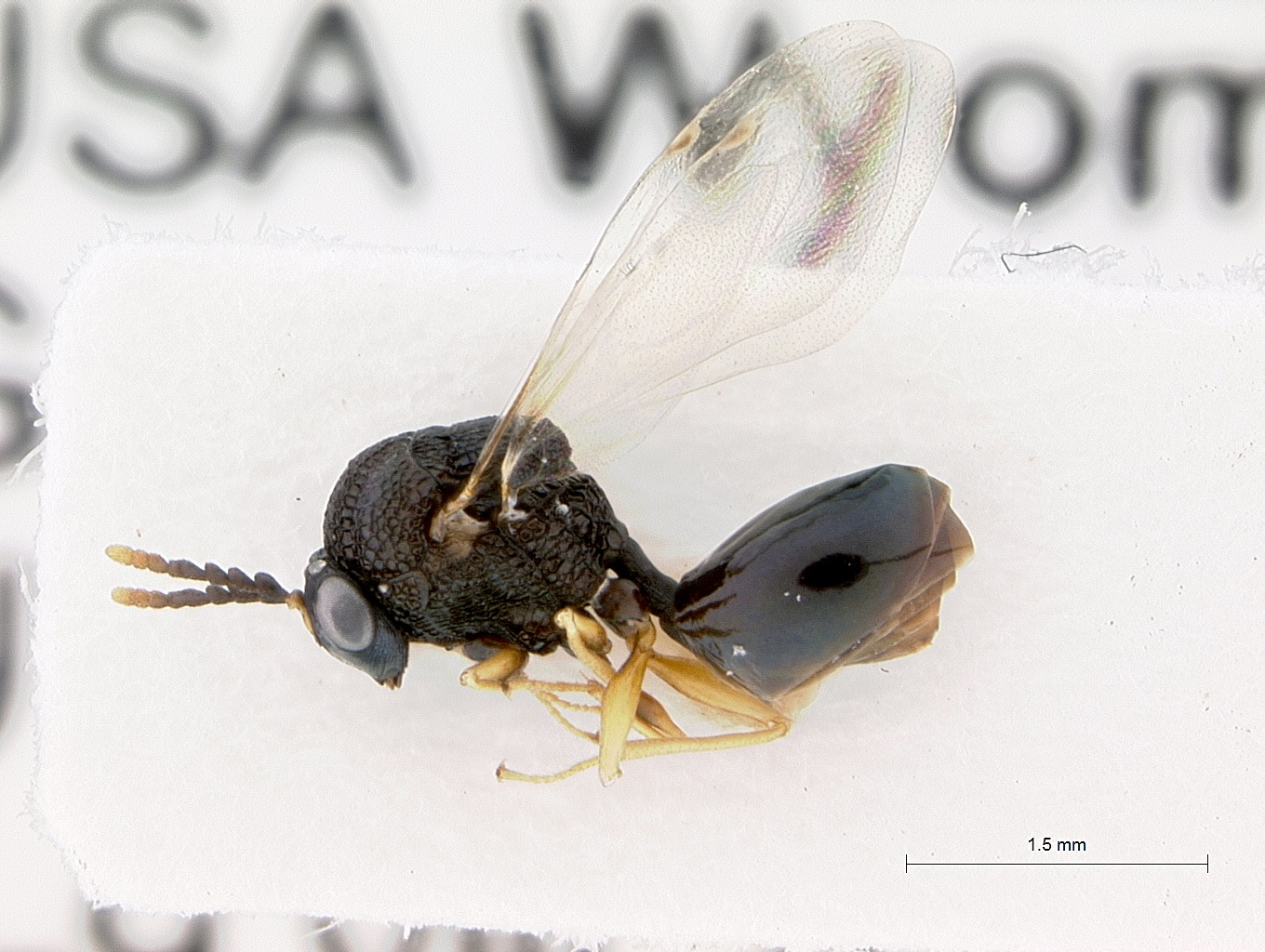
- Pseudochalcura gibbosa

Scientific classification
- Kingdom: Animalia
- Phylum: Arthropoda
- Class: Insecta
- Order: Hymenoptera
- Family: Eucharitidae
- Subfamily: Eucharitinae
- Genus: Pseudochalcura; Ashmead, 1904

= Pseudochalcura =

Genus of wasps

Pseudochalcura is a genus of chalcid wasps in the family Eucharitidae. There are about 14 described species in Pseudochalcura.

== Species ==
These 14 species belong to the genus Pseudochalcura:

- Pseudochalcura americana (Howard, 1894)^{c g}
- Pseudochalcura atra Heraty, 1986^{c g}
- Pseudochalcura carinata^{g}
- Pseudochalcura chilensis Kieffer, 1905^{c g}
- Pseudochalcura condylus Heraty, 1986^{c g}
- Pseudochalcura excruciata Heraty, 1986^{c g}
- Pseudochalcura frustrata Heraty, 1986^{c g}
- Pseudochalcura gibbosa (Provancher, 1881)^{c g b}
- Pseudochalcura liburna Heraty, 1985^{c g}
- Pseudochalcura nigrocyanea Ashmead, 1904^{c g}
- Pseudochalcura pauca Heraty, 1986^{c g}
- Pseudochalcura prolata Heraty, 1986^{c g}
- Pseudochalcura sculpturata Heraty, 1985^{c g}
- Pseudochalcura septuosa Heraty, 1986^{c g}

Data sources: i = ITIS, c = Catalogue of Life, g = GBIF, b = Bugguide.net
