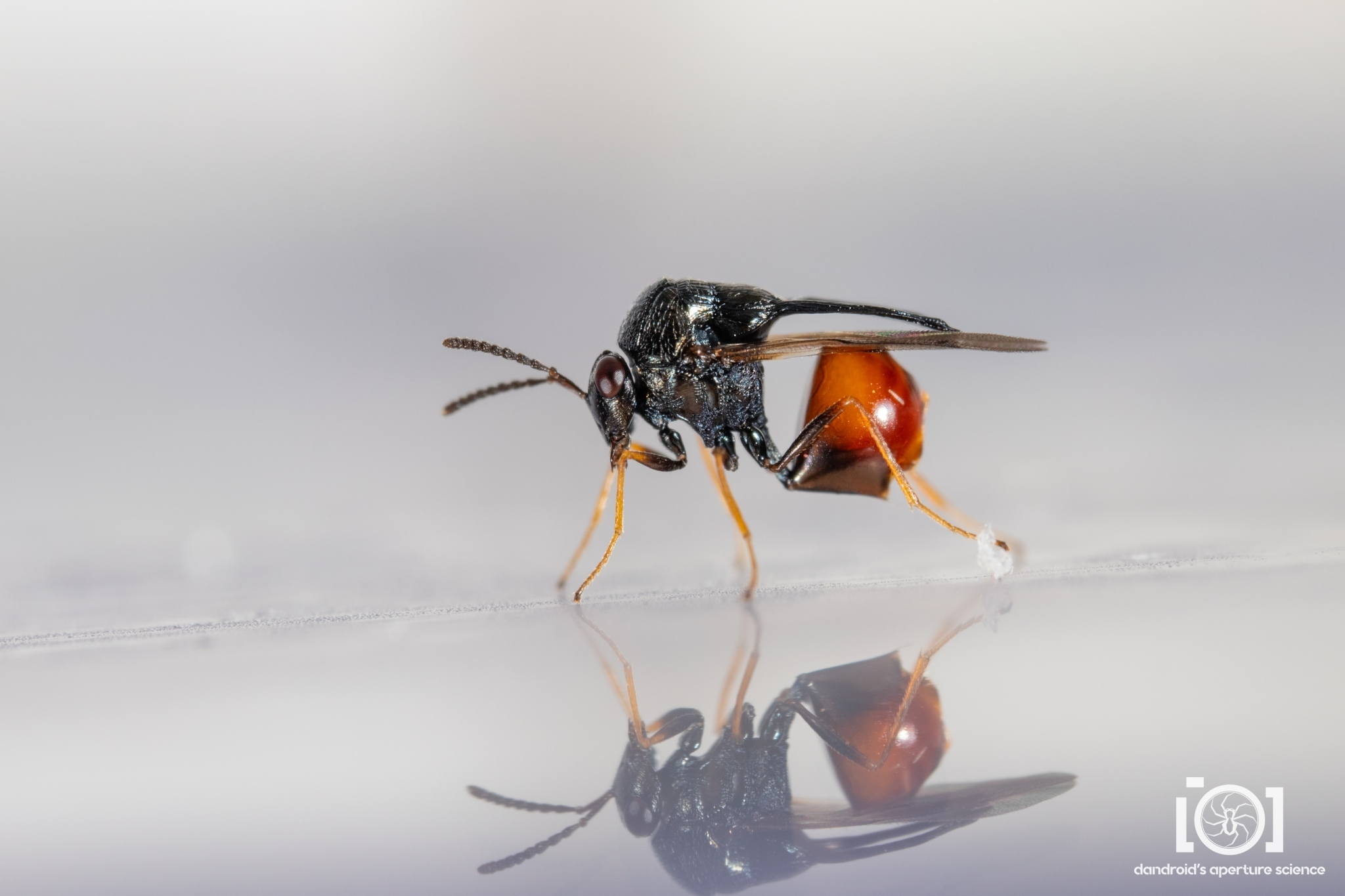
- Kapala floridana, Florida

Scientific classification
- Kingdom: Animalia
- Phylum: Arthropoda
- Class: Insecta
- Order: Hymenoptera
- Family: Eucharitidae
- Subfamily: Eucharitinae
- Tribe: Eucharitini
- Genus: Kapala; Cameron, 1884

species
- approx. 25 known species, others undescribed

= Kapala (wasp) =

Genus of wasps

Kapala is a genus of parasitic wasps in the family Eucharitidae, found primarily in the neotropics, and associated with ants.

== Species ==
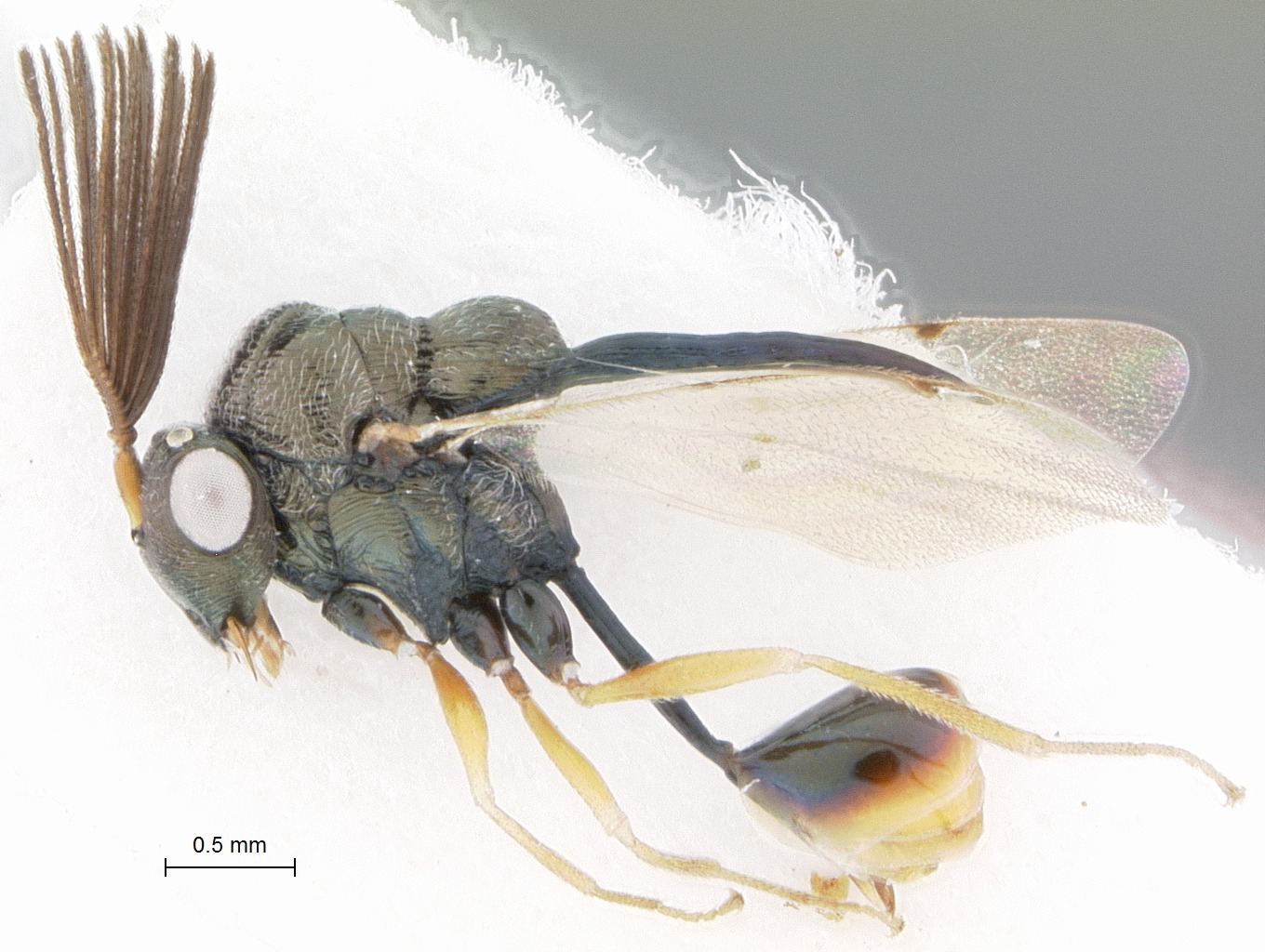
K. terminalis

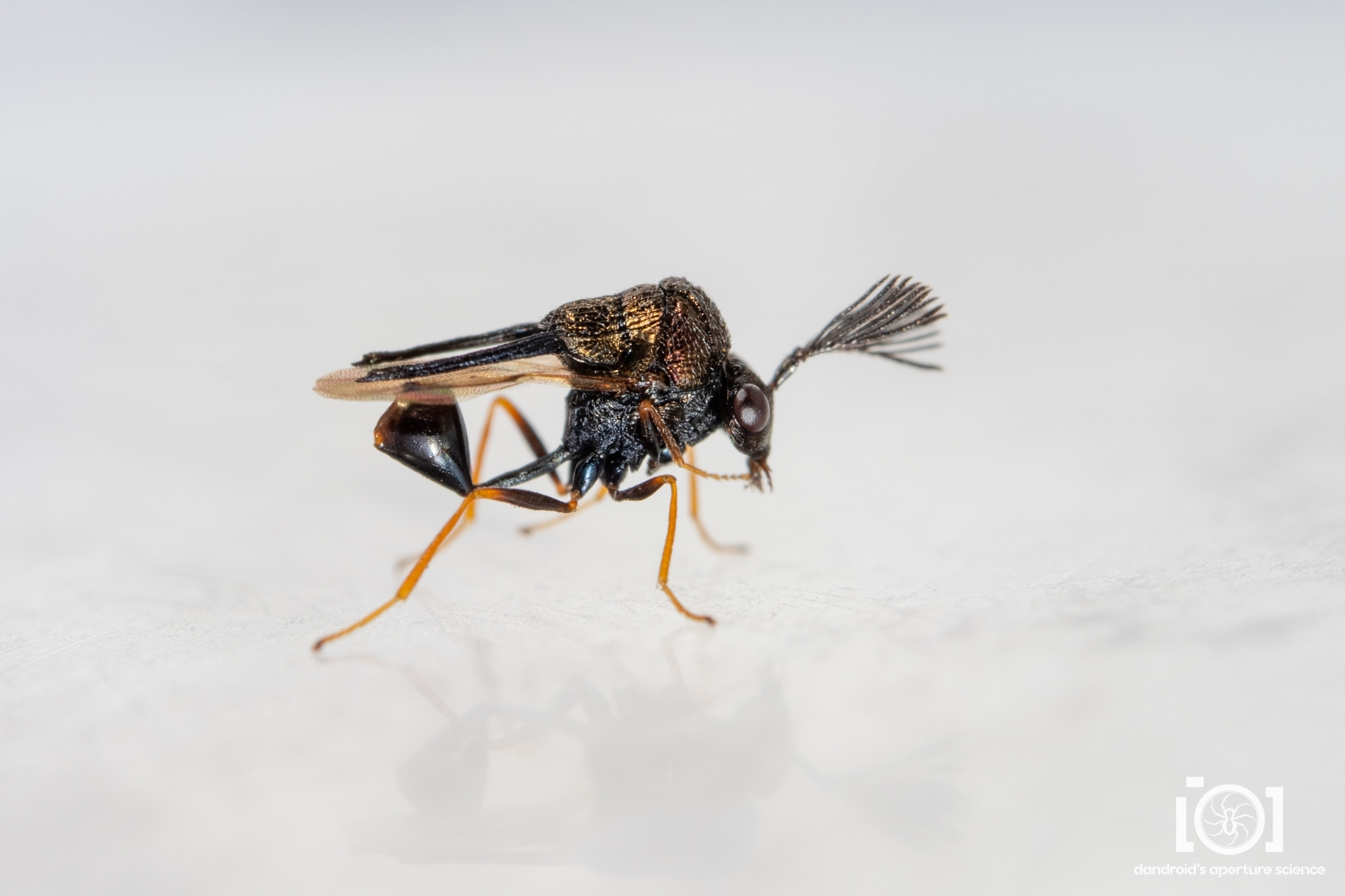
K. floridana

These 18 species belong to the genus Kapala:

- Kapala argentina Gemignani, 1933
- Kapala atrata (Walker, 1862)
- Kapala chacoensis Gemignani, 1947
- Kapala cuprea Cameron, 1913
- Kapala cynipsea (Walker, 1862)
- Kapala dicerodera (Spinola, 1853)
- Kapala flabellata (Fabricius, 1804)
- Kapala floridana (Ashmead, 1885)
- Kapala furcata (Fabricius, 1804)
- Kapala glauca Yang, 1997
- Kapala inexagens (Cameron, 1862)
- Kapala iridicolor (Cameron, 1904)
- Kapala ivorensis Risbec, 1954
- Kapala pectinicornis (Latreille, 1809)
- Kapala romandi (Guérin-Méneville, 1844)
- Kapala splendens Ashmead, 1904
- Kapala sulcifacies (Cameron, 1904)
- Kapala terminalis Ashmead, 1892
