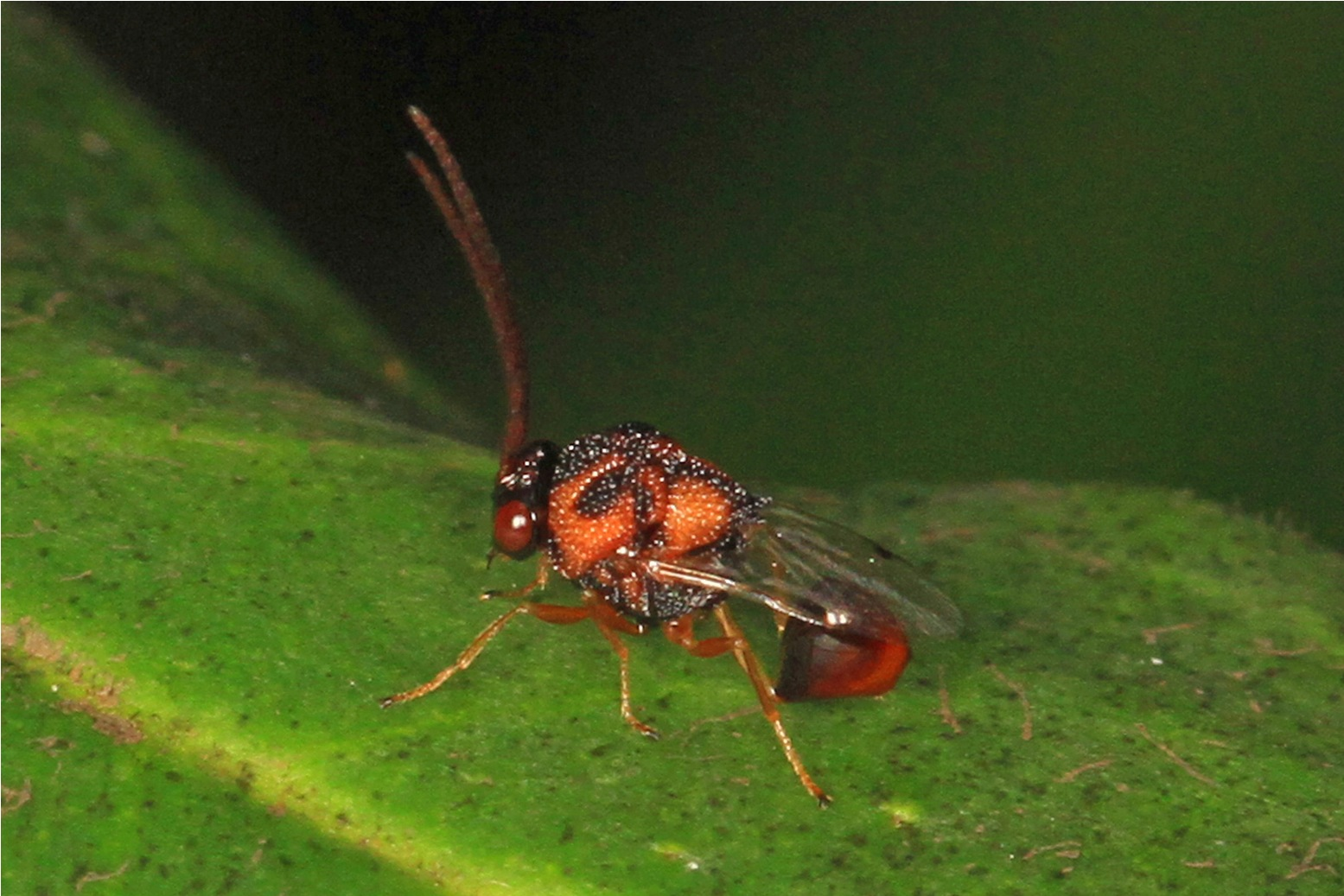
- Obeza floridana

Scientific classification
- Kingdom: Animalia
- Phylum: Arthropoda
- Class: Insecta
- Order: Hymenoptera
- Family: Eucharitidae
- Subfamily: Eucharitinae
- Genus: Obeza; Heraty, 1985

= Obeza =

Genus of wasps

Obeza is a genus of chalcid wasps in the family Eucharitidae. There are about eight described species in Obeza.

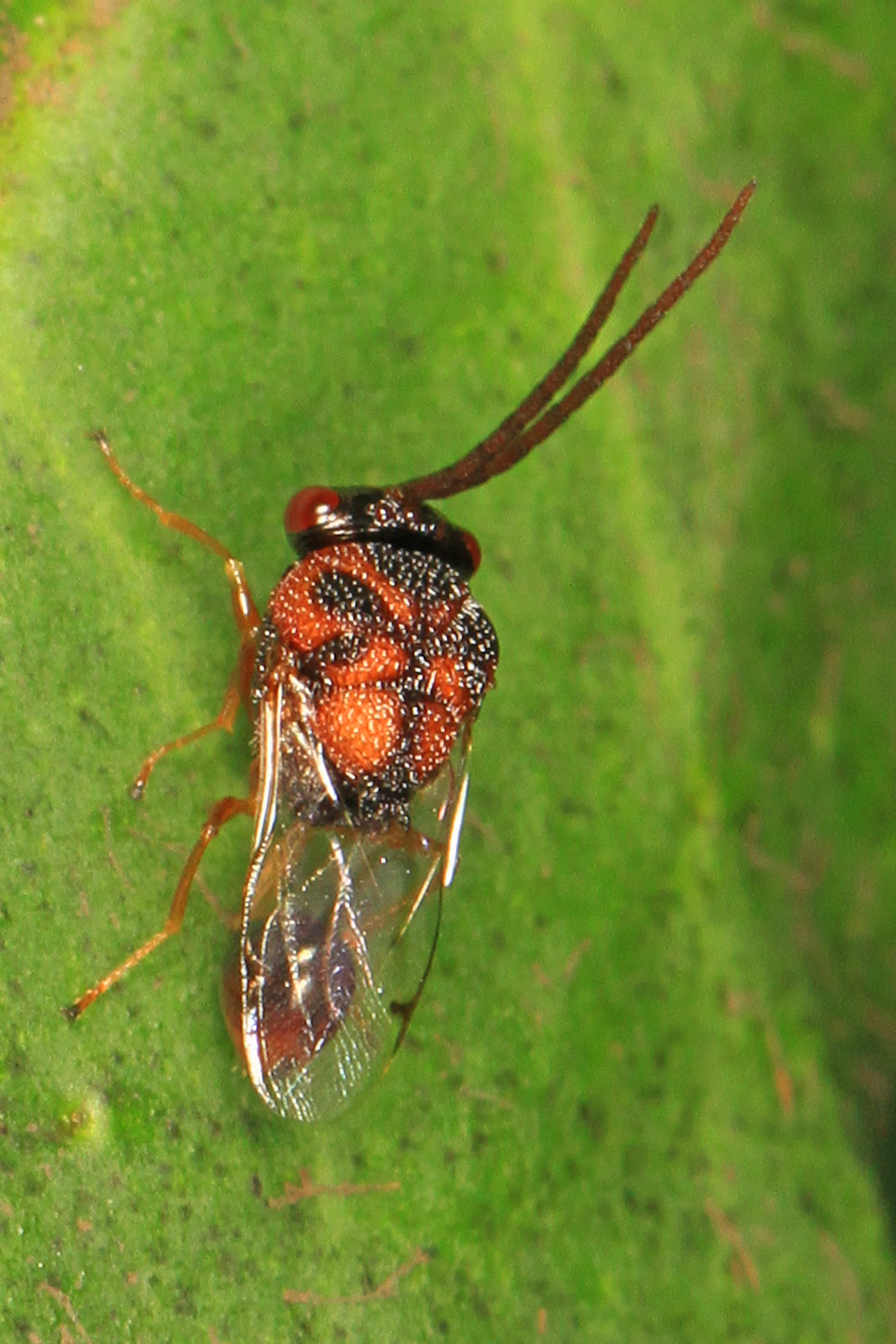
Obeza floridana

== Species ==
These eight species belong to the genus Obeza:

- Obeza floridana (Ashmead, 1888)^{c g b}
- Obeza grenadensis (Howard, 1897)^{c g}
- Obeza maculata (Westwood, 1874)^{c g}
- Obeza meridionalis (Kirby, 1889)^{c g}
- Obeza nigriceps (Ashmead, 1904)^{c g}
- Obeza nigromaculata (Cameron, 1884)^{c g}
- Obeza semifumipennis (Girault, 1911)^{c g}
- Obeza septentrionalis (Brues, 1907)^{c g}

Data sources: i = ITIS, c = Catalogue of Life, g = GBIF, b = Bugguide.net
