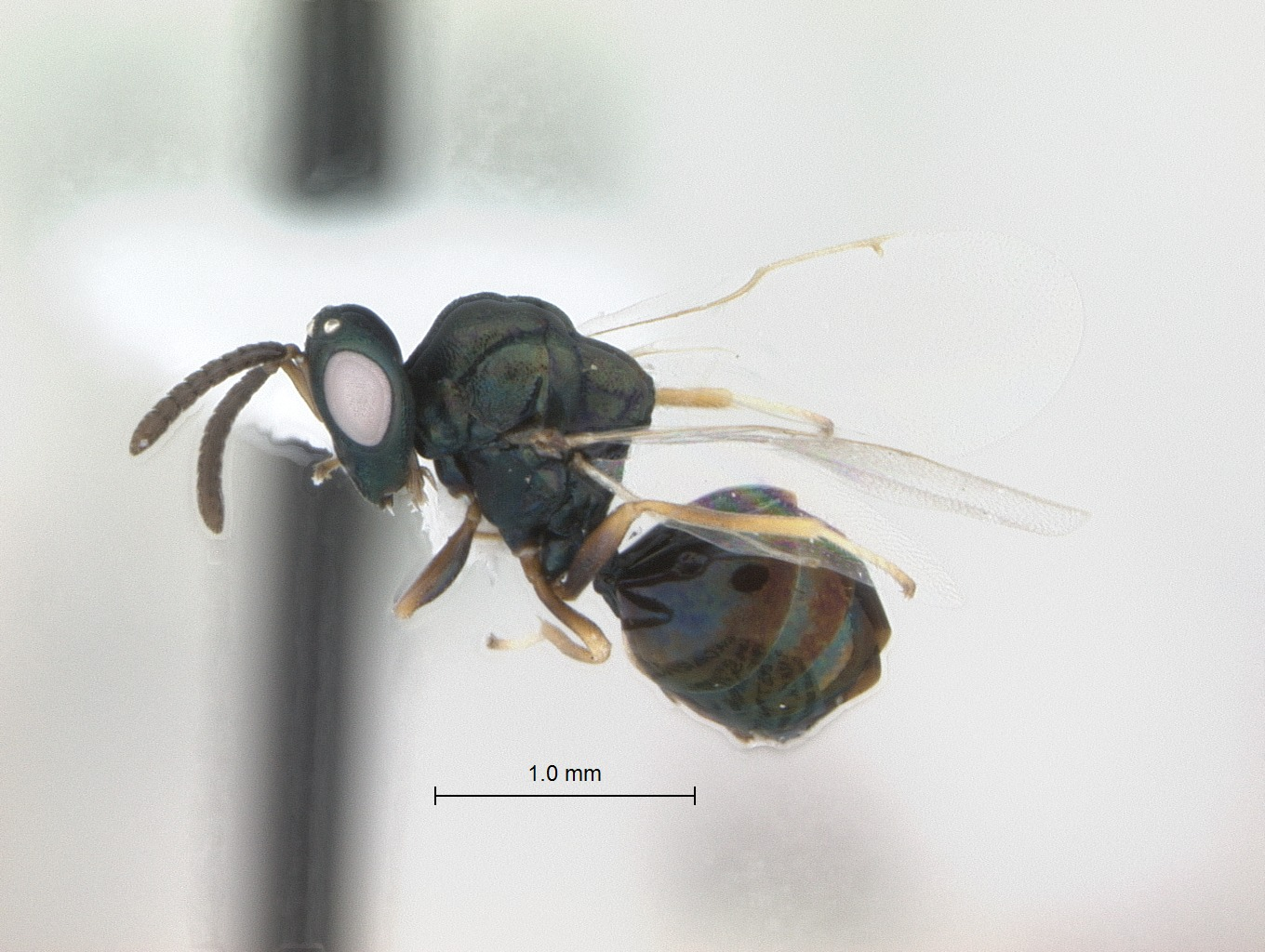

Scientific classification
- Kingdom: Animalia
- Phylum: Arthropoda
- Class: Insecta
- Order: Hymenoptera
- Family: Eucharitidae
- Genus: Orasema
- Species: O. occidentalis

Binomial name
- Orasema occidentalis Ashmead, 1892

= Orasema occidentalis =

Species of wasp

Orasema occidentalis is a species of chalcid wasp in the family Eucharitidae. The species is a parasite of Pheidole desertorum.
