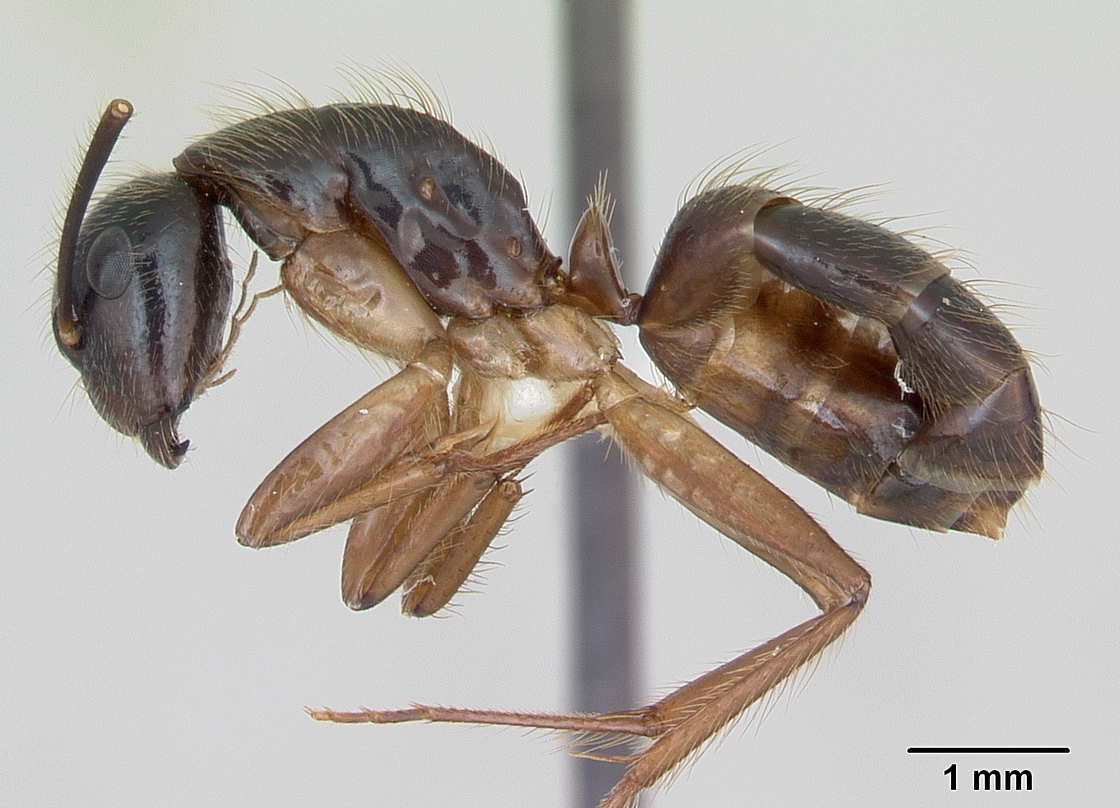
- C. atriceps worker

Scientific classification
- Kingdom: Animalia
- Phylum: Arthropoda
- Clade: Pancrustacea
- Class: Insecta
- Order: Hymenoptera
- Family: Formicidae
- Subfamily: Formicinae
- Genus: Camponotus
- Subgenus: Myrmothrix
- Species: C. atriceps

Binomial name
- Camponotus atriceps (Smith, 1858)

Synonyms
- Camponotus abdominalis Fabricius, 1804

= Camponotus atriceps =

Species of American carpenter ant

Camponotus atriceps, previously referred to as C. abdominalis, is a species of carpenter ant, endemic to the Americas. In the Amazon region, C. atriceps has been seen attacking colonies of stingless bees of the genus Melipona, especially M. flavolineata and M. fasciculata. It destroys hives and eats brood when food is low. Field research at Embrapa Amazônia Oriental in Brazil discovered that ants can be attracted to empty hive "trap boxes," offering an efficient non-chemical alternative for safeguarding managed bee colonies. Utilization of trap boxes in communal shelters of stingless bee colonies can serve as a non-chemical method for controlling tracuá carpenter ants (C. atriceps).

== Behaviour ==
Camponotus atriceps exhibits temporal niche partitioning with diurnal sympatric species, such as Camponotus crassus. By foraging strictly at night, C. atriceps reduces direct resource competition and aggressive interactions with daytime-active ants sharing the same habitat.

== Habitat ==
It has been found in a variety of moist and forested habitats, including wet lowland and rainforest, tropical rainforests, pine or oak forests, wet montane forest, and in mature wet forest. It occurs from near sea level to as high as 2,290 meters.

== Subspecies ==
There is one accepted subspecies, Camponotus atriceps nocens Wheeler, 1911.

== Parasites ==
A variety of parasites have been identified from the subspecies, Camponotus abdominalis floridanus. These include the inquilines Microdon fulgens, Myrmecophila pergandei, an undetermined species of Atelurinae, Alachua floridensis and Obeza floridana. The cockroach, Myrmecoblatta wheeleri has also been found associated with the ant in southern Florida.
