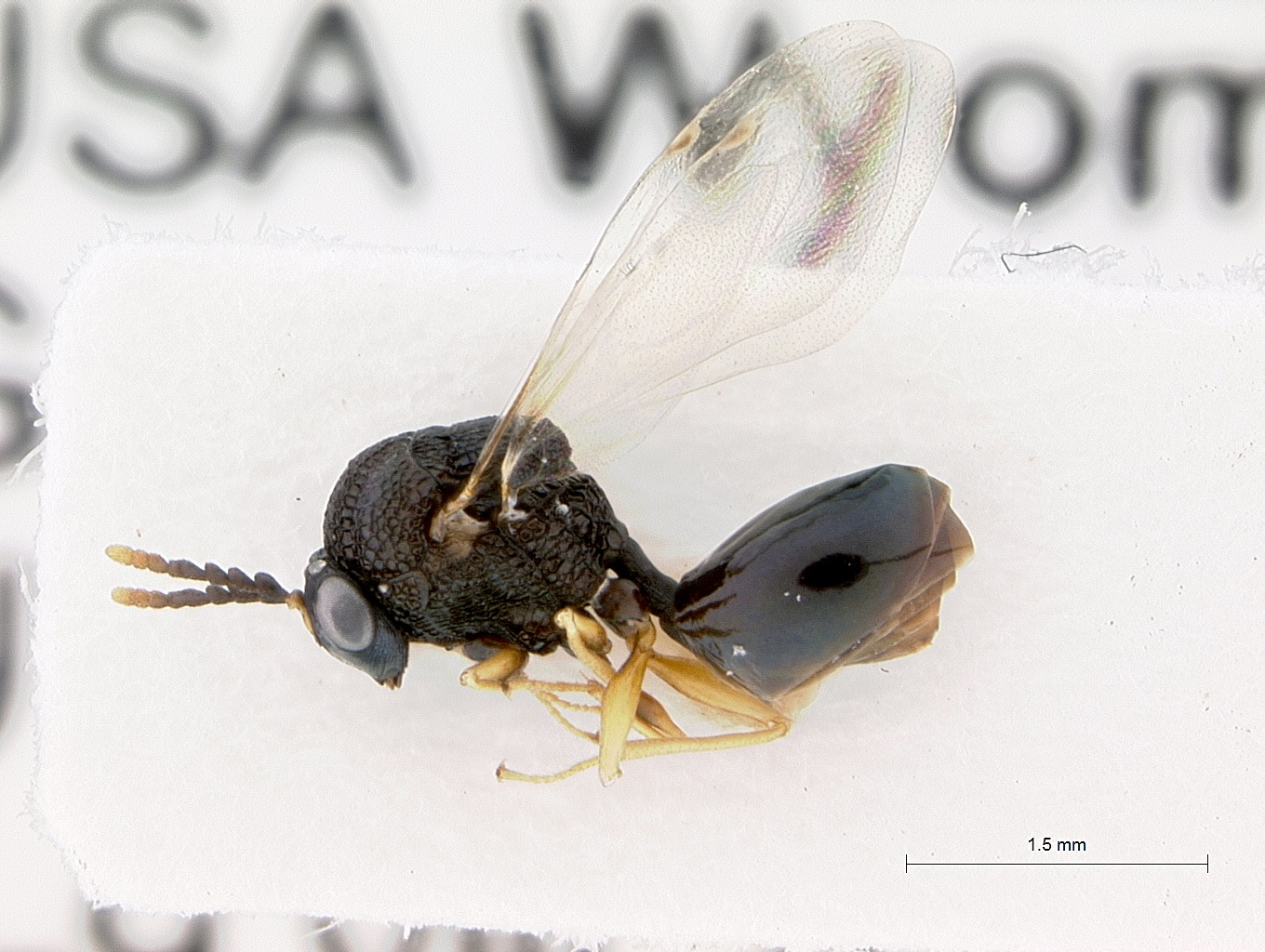

Scientific classification
- Kingdom: Animalia
- Phylum: Arthropoda
- Class: Insecta
- Order: Hymenoptera
- Family: Eucharitidae
- Genus: Pseudochalcura
- Species: P. gibbosa

Binomial name
- Pseudochalcura gibbosa (Provancher, 1881)

= Pseudochalcura gibbosa =

Species of wasp

Pseudochalcura gibbosa is a species of chalcid wasp in the family Eucharitidae. It is associated with ants from the Camponotus genus.
