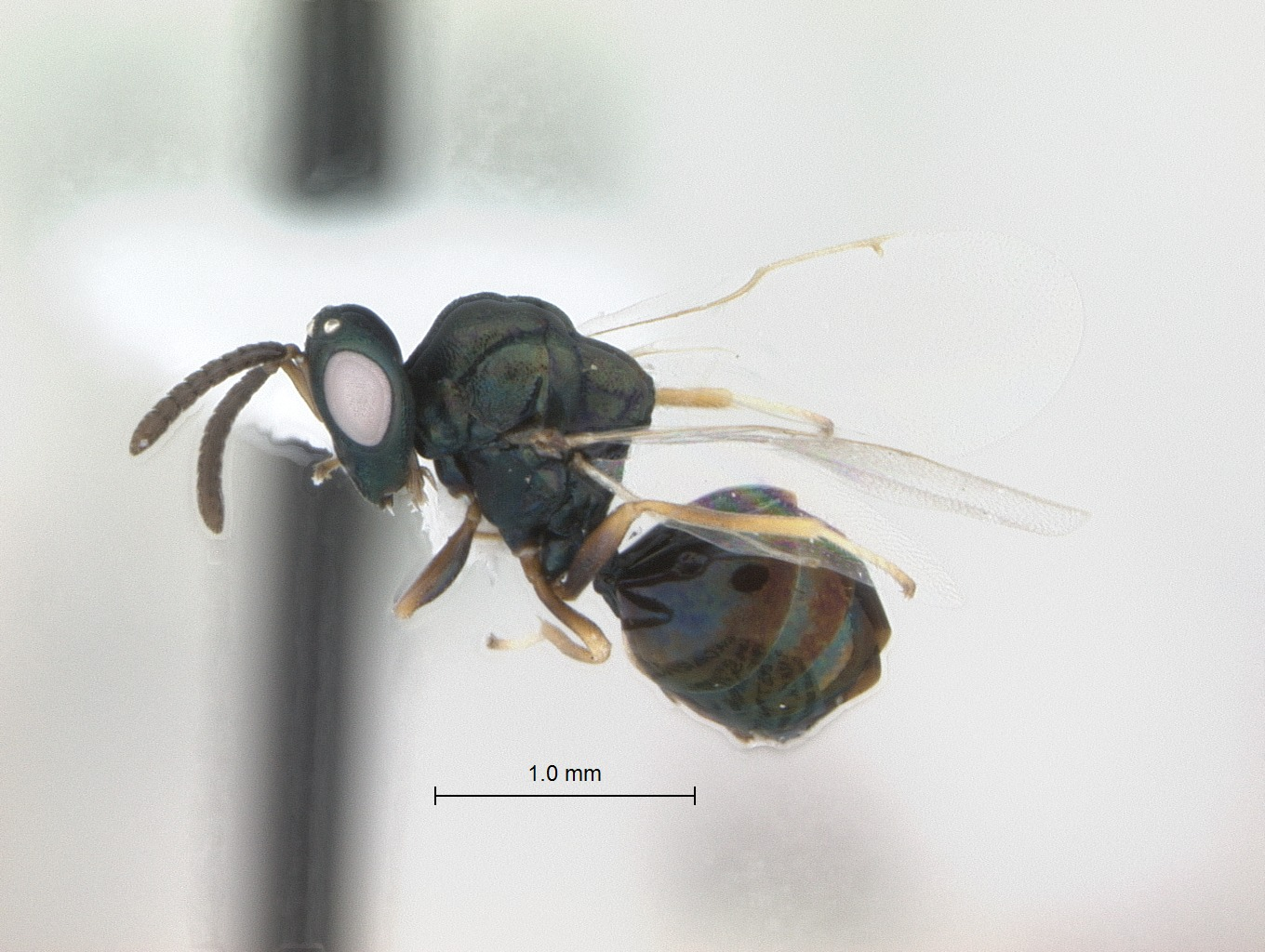
- Orasema occidentalis

Scientific classification
- Kingdom: Animalia
- Phylum: Arthropoda
- Class: Insecta
- Order: Hymenoptera
- Family: Eucharitidae
- Subfamily: Oraseminae
- Genus: Orasema; Cameron, 1884

= Orasema =

Genus of wasps

Orasema is a genus of chalcid wasps in the family Eucharitidae. There are at least 50 described species in Orasema.

== Species ==
These 53 species belong to the genus Orasema:

- Orasema aenea Gahan, 1940^{c g}
- Orasema argentina Gemignani, 1933^{c g}
- Orasema assectator Kerrich, 1963^{c g}
- Orasema aureoviridis Gahan, 1940^{c g}
- Orasema bakeri Gahan, 1940^{c g}
- Orasema beameri Gahan, 1940^{c g}
- Orasema bouceki Heraty, 1994^{c g}
- Orasema cameroni Howard, 1897^{c g}
- Orasema cockerelli Gahan, 1940^{c g}
- Orasema coloradensis Wheeler, 1907^{c g}
- Orasema communis Risbec, 1952^{c g}
- Orasema costaricensis Wheeler & Wheeler, 1937^{c g}
- Orasema delhiensis Narendran & Girish Kumar, 2005^{c g}
- Orasema delicatula (Walker, 1862)^{c g}
- Orasema deltae Gemignani, 1937^{c g}
- Orasema festiva (Fabricius, 1804)^{c g}
- Orasema fraudulenta (Reichensperger, 1913)^{c g}
- Orasema gemignanii De Santis, 1967^{c g}
- Orasema glabra Heraty, 1994^{c g}
- Orasema initiator Kerrich, 1963^{c g}
- Orasema ishii Heraty, 1994^{c g}
- Orasema koghisiana Heraty, 1994^{c g}
- Orasema minuta Ashmead, 1888^{c g}
- Orasema minutissima Howard, 1894^{c g}
- Orasema monomoria Heraty, 2000^{c g}
- Orasema neomexicana Gahan, 1940^{c g}
- Orasema nigra Heraty, 1994^{c g}
- Orasema occidentalis Ashmead, 1892^{c g b}
- Orasema pireta Heraty, 1993^{c g}
- Orasema promecea Heraty, 1994^{c g}
- Orasema rapo (Walker, 1839)^{c g}
- Orasema robertsoni Gahan, 1940^{c g}
- Orasema rugulosa Heraty, 1994^{c g}
- Orasema salebrosa Heraty, 1993^{c g}
- Orasema seyrigi Risbec, 1952^{c g}
- Orasema simplex Heraty, 1993^{c g}
- Orasema simulatrix Gahan, 1940^{c g}
- Orasema sixaolae Wheeler & Wheeler, 1937^{c g}
- Orasema smithi Howard, 1897^{c g}
- Orasema stramineipes Cameron, 1884^{c g}
- Orasema striatosoma Heraty, 1994^{c g}
- Orasema susanae Gemignani, 1947^{c g}
- Orasema synempora Heraty, 1994^{c g}
- Orasema texana Gahan, 1940^{c g}
- Orasema tolteca Mann, 1914^{c g}
- Orasema uichancoi (Ishii, 1932)^{c g}
- Orasema valgius (Walker, 1839)^{c g}
- Orasema vianai Gemignani, 1937^{c g}
- Orasema violacea Ashmead, 1888^{c g}
- Orasema viridis Ashmead, 1895^{c g}
- Orasema wheeleri Wheeler, 1907^{c g}
- Orasema worcesteri (Girault, 1913)^{c g}
- Orasema xanthopus (Cameron, 1909)^{c g}

Data sources: i = ITIS, c = Catalogue of Life, g = GBIF, b = Bugguide.net
