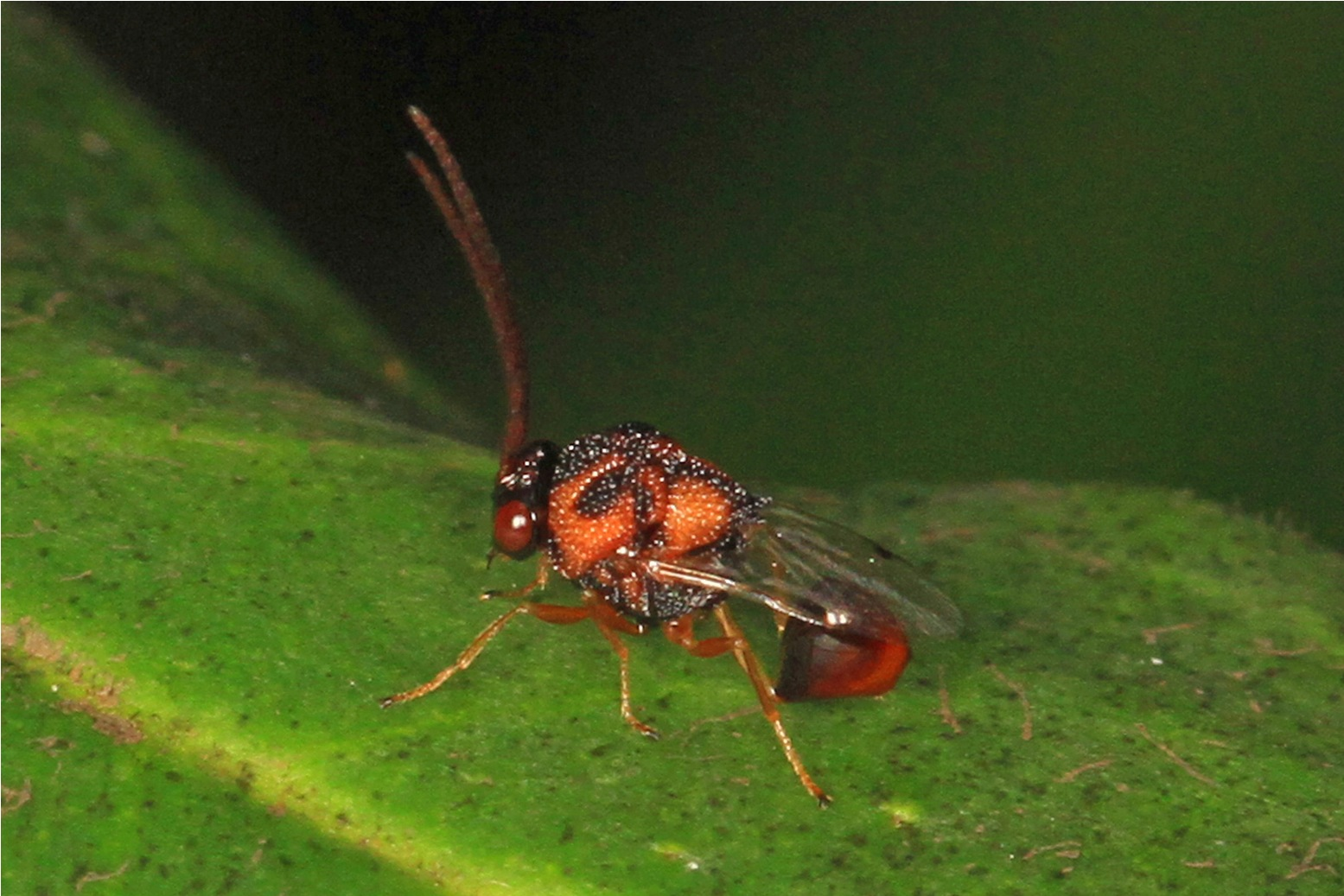

Scientific classification
- Kingdom: Animalia
- Phylum: Arthropoda
- Class: Insecta
- Order: Hymenoptera
- Family: Eucharitidae
- Genus: Obeza
- Species: O. floridana

Binomial name
- Obeza floridana (Ashmead, 1888)

= Obeza floridana =

Species of wasp

Obeza floridana is a species of chalcid wasp in the family Eucharitidae.

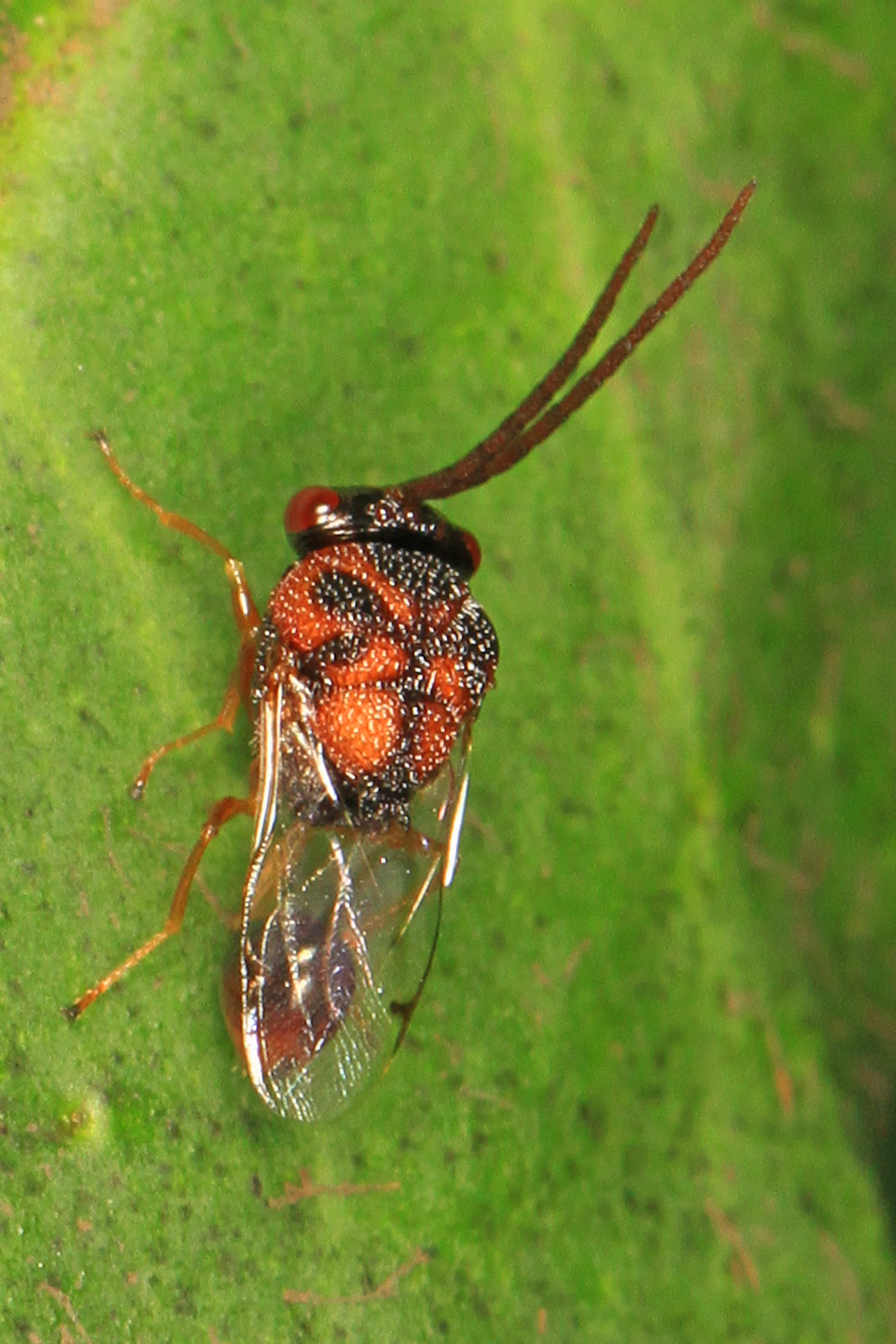
