= Oraseminae =

Scientific classification
- Kingdom: Animalia
- Phylum: Arthropoda
- Class: Insecta
- Order: Hymenoptera
- Family: Eucharitidae
- Subfamily: Oraseminae; Burks, 1979

Subfamily of wasps

Oraseminae is a subfamily of chalcid wasps in the family Eucharitidae. There are at least 10 genera in Oraseminae.

== Genera ==
- Australosema Heraty & Burks, 2017^{g}
- Cymosema Heraty & Burks, 2017^{g}
- Hayatosema Heraty & Burks, 2017^{g}
- Ibitya Heraty & Burks, 2017^{g}
- Indosema Husain & Agarwal, 1983^{c g}
- Ivieosema Heraty & Burks, 2017^{g}
- Leiosema Heraty & Burks, 2017^{g}
- Losbanus Ishii, 1932
- Matantas Heraty & Burks, 2017^{g}
- Orasema Cameron, 1884^{c g b}
- Orasemorpha Boucek, 1988^{c g}
- Timioderus Waterston, 1916^{c g}
- Zuparka Heraty & Burks, 2017^{g}

Data sources: i = ITIS, c = Catalogue of Life, g = GBIF, b = Bugguide.net
