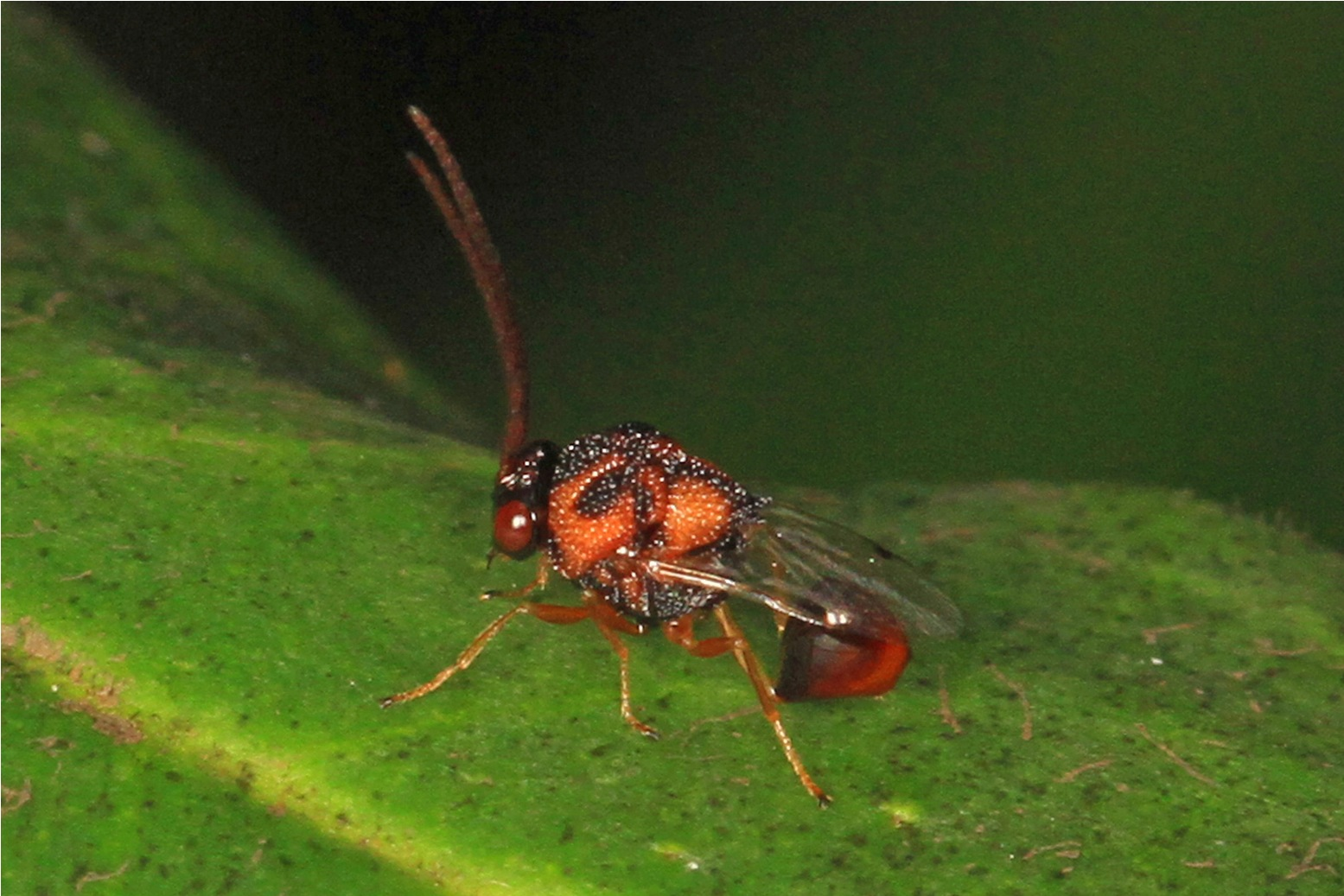
- Obeza floridana

Scientific classification
- Kingdom: Animalia
- Phylum: Arthropoda
- Class: Insecta
- Order: Hymenoptera
- Family: Eucharitidae
- Subfamily: Eucharitinae

= Eucharitinae =

Subfamily of wasps

Eucharitinae is a subfamily of chalcid wasps in the family Eucharitidae.

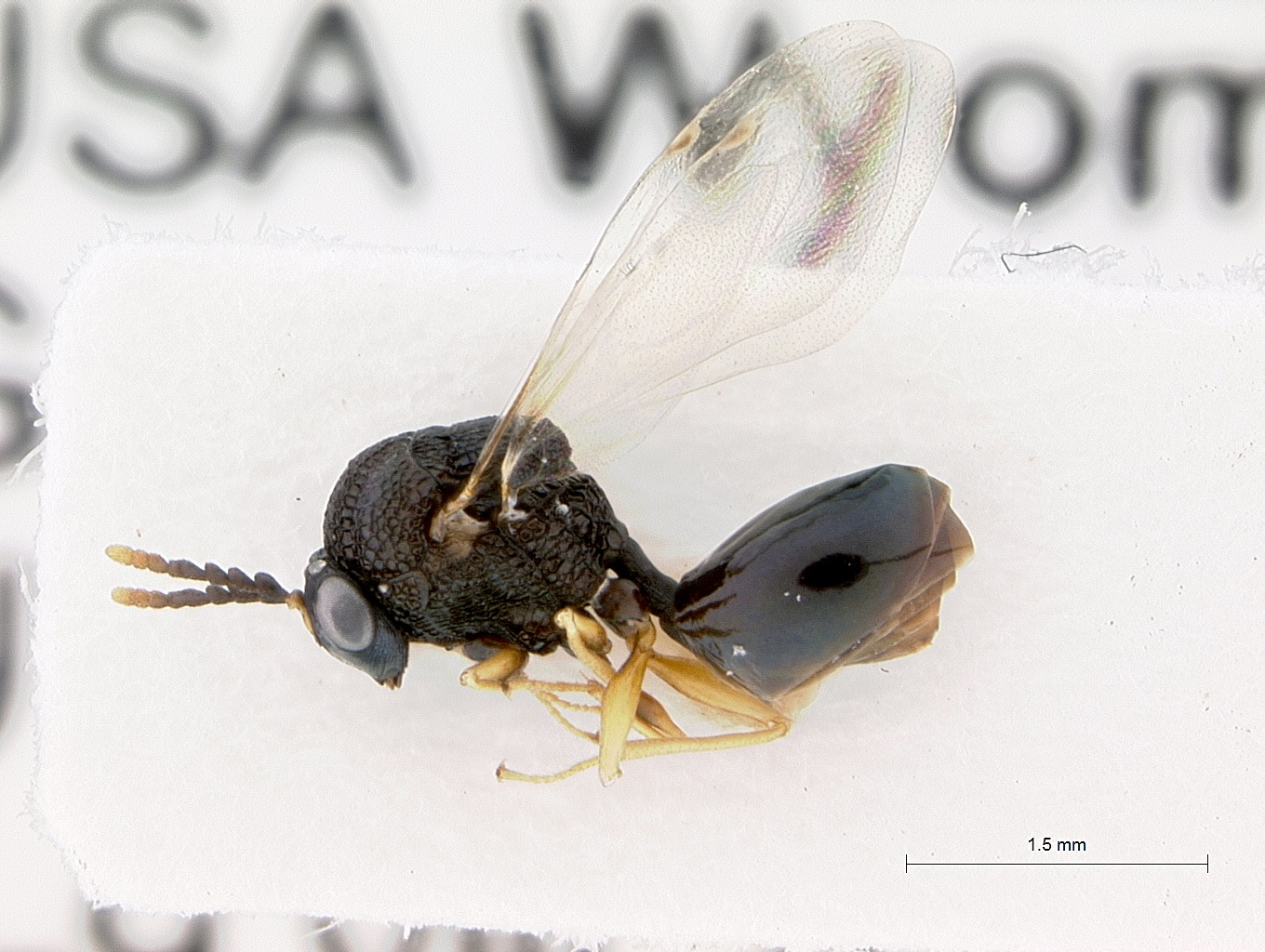
Pseudochalcura gibbosa

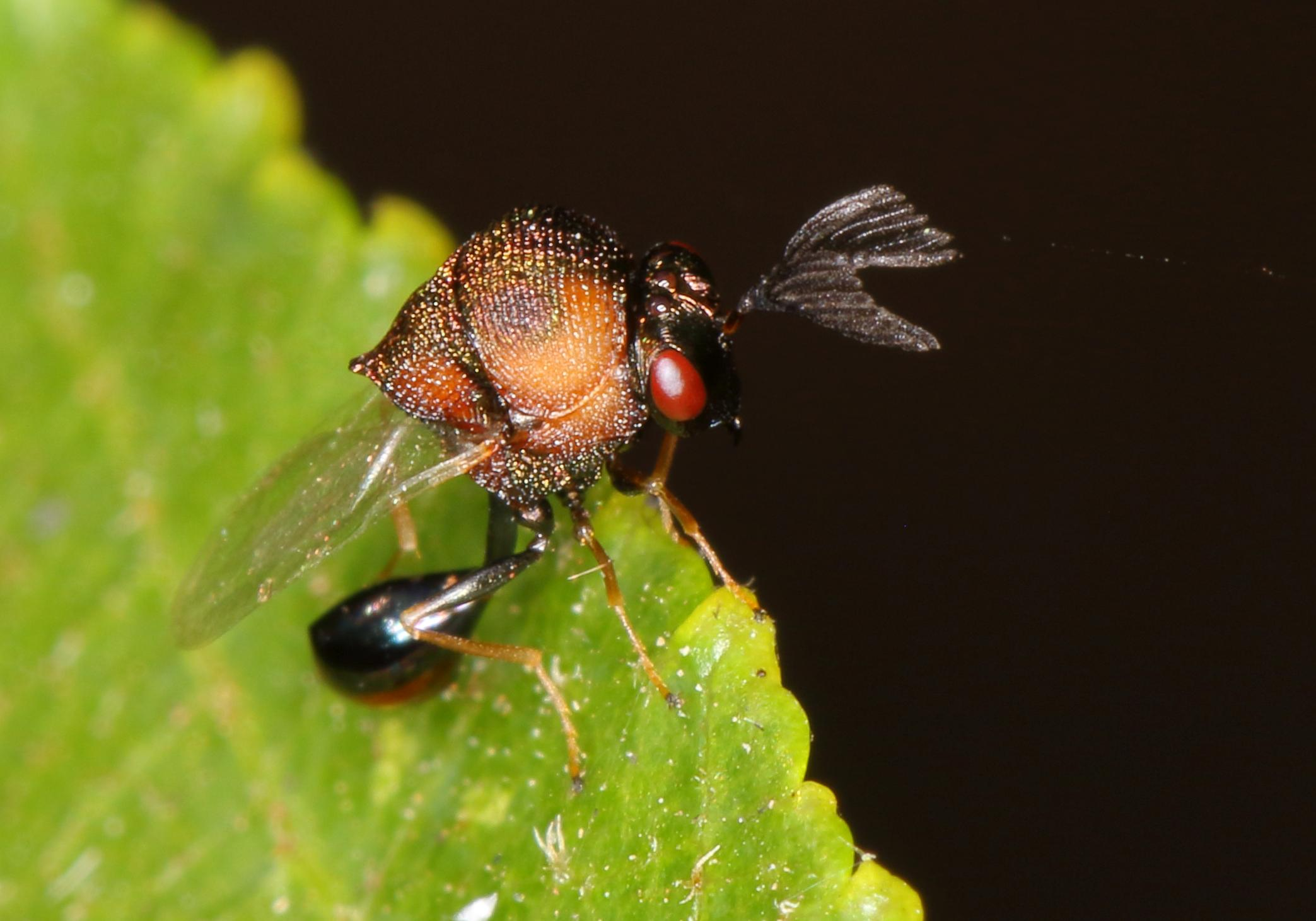
Hydrorhoa stevensoni

== Genera ==
- Ancylotropus Cameron, 1909
- Apometagea Heraty, 2002
- Athairocharis Heraty, 2002
- Austeucharis Boucek, 1988
- Babcockiella Heraty, 2002
- Carletonia Heraty, 2002
- Chalcura Kirby, 1886
- Cherianella Narendran, 1994
- Colocharis Heraty, 2002
- Cyneucharis Heraty, 2002
- Dicoelothorax Ashmead, 1899
- Dilocantha Shipp, 1894
- Eucharis Latreille, 1804
- Eucharissa Westwood, 1868
- Galearia Brullé, 1846
- Hydrorhoa Kieffer, 1905
- Isomerala Shipp, 1894
- Kapala Cameron, 1884
- Lasiokapala Ashmead, 1899
- Latina Koçak & Kemal, 2008
- Leurocharis Heraty, 2002
- Lirata Cameron, 1884
- Liratella Girault, 1913
- Lophyrocera Cameron, 1884
- Mateucharis Boucek & Watsham, 1982
- Mictocharis Heraty, 2002
- Mimistaka Heraty, 2005
- Neolirata Torrens & Heraty, 2013
- Neolosbanus Heraty, 1994
- Neostilbula Heraty, 2002
- Obeza Heraty, 1985
- †Palaeocharis Heraty & Darling, 2009
- Parakapala Gemignani, 1937
- Parapsilogastrus Ghesquière, 1946
- Pogonocharis Heraty, 2002
- Pseudochalcura Ashmead, 1904
- Pseudometagea Ashmead, 1899
- Psilocharis Heraty, 1994
- Rhipipalloidea Girault, 1934
- Saccharissa Kirby, 1886
- Schizaspidia Westwood, 1835
- Stilbula Spinola, 1811
- Stilbuloida Boucek, 1988
- Striostilbula Boucek, 1988
- Substilbula Boucek, 1988
- Thoracantha Latreille, 1825
- Thoracanthoides Girault, 1928
- Tricoryna Kirby, 1886
- Zulucharis Heraty, 2002
