= Akapala =

Scientific classification
- Domain: Eukaryota
- Kingdom: Animalia
- Phylum: Arthropoda
- Class: Insecta
- Order: Hymenoptera
- Family: Eucharitidae
- Subfamily: Akapalinae
- Genus: Akapala; Girault, 1934

Genus of parasitic wasps

Akapala is a genus of parasitic wasps, the only genus in the subfamily Akapalinae. It contains two species: A. astriaticeps and A. rudis.
