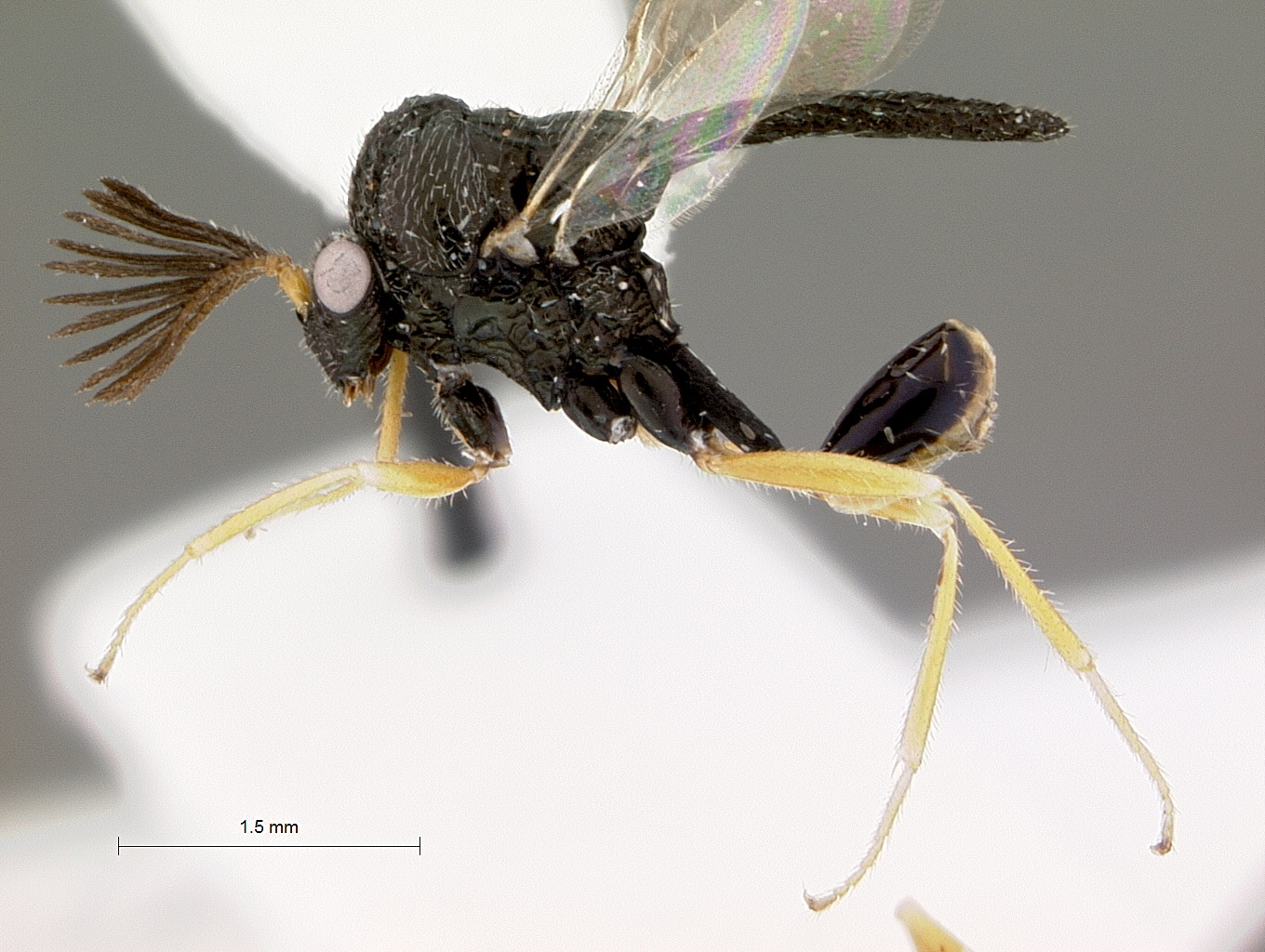
- Latina guriana

Scientific classification
- Domain: Eukaryota
- Kingdom: Animalia
- Phylum: Arthropoda
- Class: Insecta
- Order: Hymenoptera
- Family: Eucharitidae
- Subfamily: Eucharitinae
- Tribe: Eucharitini
- Genus: Latina; Koçak & Kemal, 2008

Synonyms
- Laurella Heraty, 2002

= Latina (wasp) =

Genus of wasps

Latina is a genus of South American chalcid wasps in the family Eucharitidae. There are four known species of Latina with three known in Argentina and one from Venezuela.

Originally the genus was named Laurella in 2002, but it turned out that the name had already been assigned to a genus of bee flies 30 years prior, and so the name Latina was adopted as a replacement, in honor of Latin America where the genus occurs.

== Biology ==
Like all members of the Euchratidae, Latina wasps are ant parasitoids. The wasp lays eggs on the undersides of leaves near the nests of Ponerine ants. Within a few days the eggs hatch into planidial larvae that are mobile and can leap. They enter the ant colony, most likely being carried by, or riding on, the ants. Once inside, they seek out ant larvae as hosts. There the planidia attach to ant host larvae or prepupae where they feed. On completing their development they emerge, leaving the remains of the ant larva.

== Species ==
- Latina bonariensis - Argentina
- Latina guriana - Venezuela
- Latina rugosa - Argentina
- Latina vianai - Argentina
