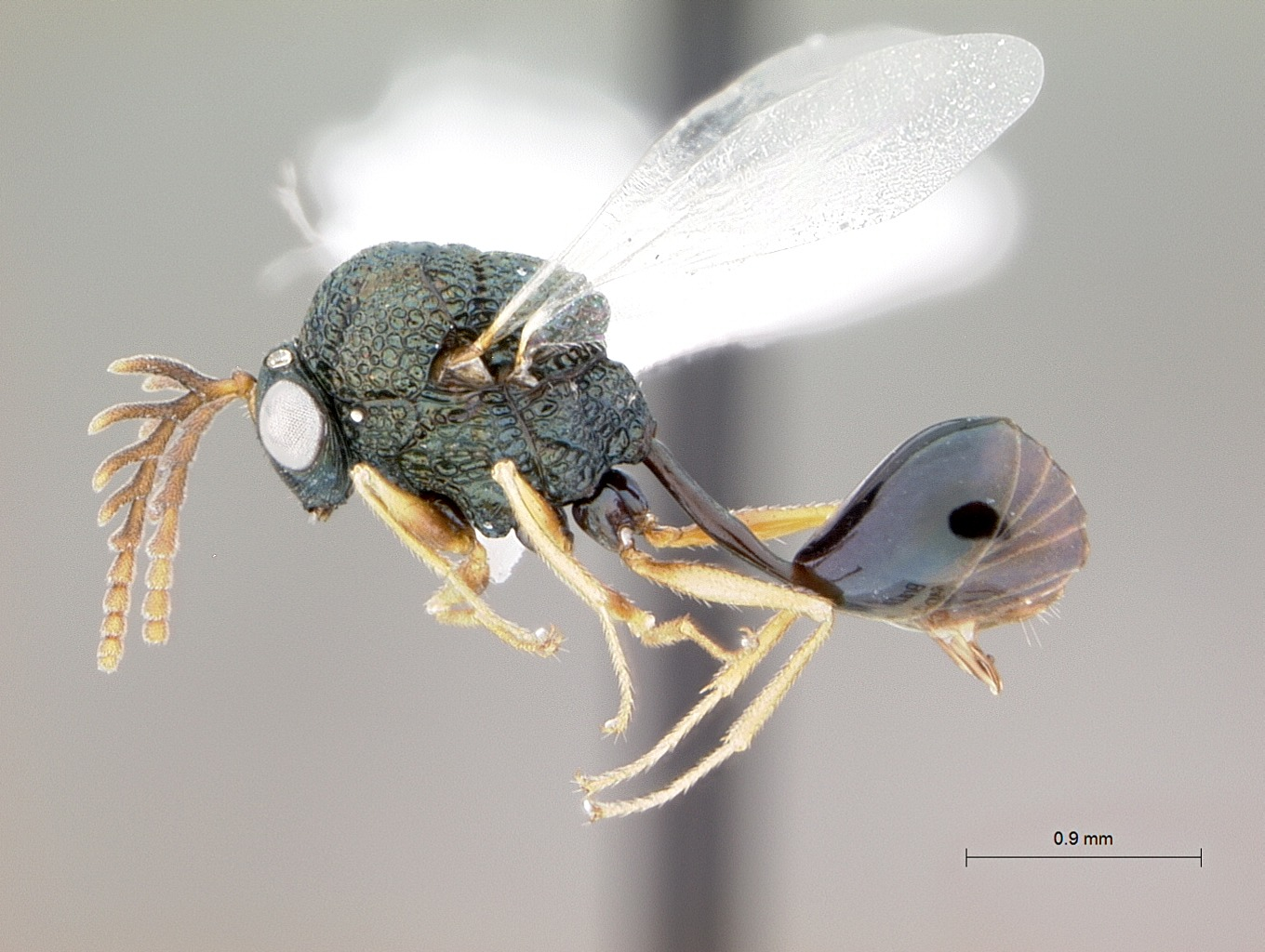
- Pseudochalcura nigrocyanea

Scientific classification
- Kingdom: Animalia
- Phylum: Arthropoda
- Class: Insecta
- Order: Hymenoptera
- Superfamily: Chalcidoidea
- Family: Eucharitidae; Latreille, 1809

Subfamilies
- Akapalinae; Eucharitinae; Gollumiellinae; Oraseminae

Diversity
- 4 subfamilies 42 genera 400 species

= Eucharitidae =

Eucharitidae Temporal range: Priabonian–Recent

Family of wasps

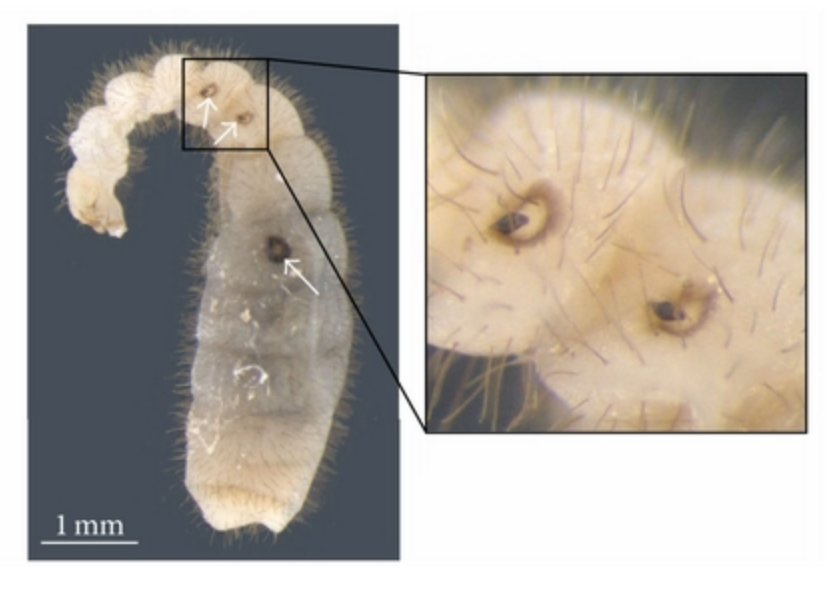
Latina rugosa planidia (arrows, magnified) attached to an ant larva

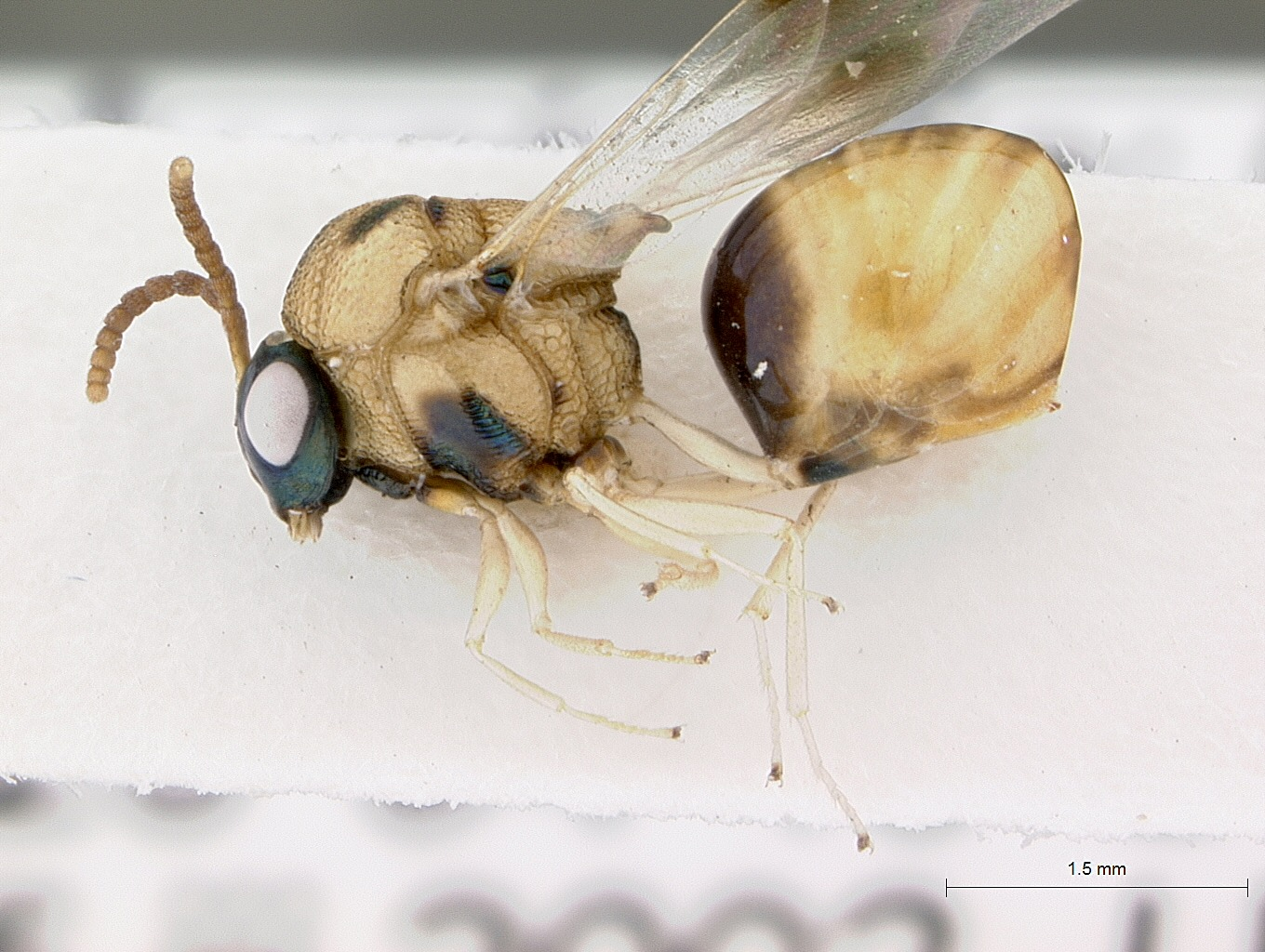
Stilbula quinqueguttata from Australia

The Eucharitidae are a family of parasitic wasps. Eucharitid wasps are members of the superfamily Chalcidoidea and consist of four subfamilies: Akapalinae, Eucharitinae, Gollumiellinae, and Oraseminae. Most of the 42 genera and >400 species of Eucharitidae are members of the subfamilies Oraseminae and Eucharitinae, and are found in tropical regions of the world.

Eucharitids are specialized parasitoids of ants, meaning each species is usually only parasitic of one genus of ant. Furthermore, they are one of the few parasitoids that have been able to use ants as hosts, despite ants’ effective defense systems against most parasitoids. Eucharitid parasitism occurs year-round, with a majority of it occurring during hot and humid months. However, the amount of parasitism that occurs depends primarily on the size of the ant colony and the number of host pupae in them, and not on the season.

== Life cycle ==
Female eucharitids oviposit rows of eggs into plant tissue, such as leaves and stems, away from ant colonies. The eggs are a translucent white and are about 0.19 mm long and 0.08 mm wide. They are elliptical and flat on one side. As the eggs mature, they turn a brown color and ten days after oviposition, they hatch. The larvae are solely responsible for their entry into the ant colony and the parasitism of their host. They are 0.13 mm long and are able to travel several inches on the leaf but do not leave the egg cluster. After six to seven days, they attach themselves to foraging ants heading back to their brood; however, sometimes they will attach themselves to other insects, using them as intermediate hosts. Once in the brood, the larvae will attach to their host larva. Some Eucharitidae are external parasites while others are internal parasites; however, all eucharitid species finish their development as ectoparasites.

Limited feeding on the host occurs until the host pupates, after which, most of it is consumed by the wasp. Usually, only one parasite per host is found, but in some cases, superparasitism occurs, and two to four wasps will attach to, and emerge from one host. Once the wasps emerge, the ant colony grooms and feeds them as if they were part of the ants’ brood. In some instances, worker ants have been observed assisting the wasps to emerge from their host. The wasps gain acceptance in these ways, and the ants show no signs of aggression because the wasps acquire their host's odor upon entry into the colony. By mimicking the odor of their host, eucharitid wasps are able to keep themselves safe until the scent wears off, at which point they leave the ant colony and begin mating.

Adult wasps emerge from the ant nest in the morning; the males emerge before the females. In most cases, the males swarm one to two feet above the nest, and as soon as the females emerge, mating occurs. However, the males of certain species, such as Kapala terminalis, calmly wait on foliage surrounding the nest until the females emerge. Many times, the males will begin mating with the females before they have a chance to take flight, and in some instances, mating will occur while the wasps are still inside the ants' nest. After mating, the females lay all their eggs in one day. The egg capacity of each female is 1000 to 10000.

== Anatomy ==
Most eucharitids are between 2.0 and 5.4 mm long and vary from metallic colors to black. They have 13 or fewer segments on their antennae, but some have up to 26.

The main anatomical characteristics of eucharitid wasps are:

- The prepectus lies in the same plane as, and fused, to pronotum.
- The pronotum is small and hidden by the head dorsally.
- The gaster is usually relatively small with a very long petiole.
- The forewing marginal vein is moderately long and stigmal, and the postmarginal veins are extremely short.
- Moderately large, about 2.0 to 5.4 mm in length.

== Subfamilies ==
=== Oraseminae ===
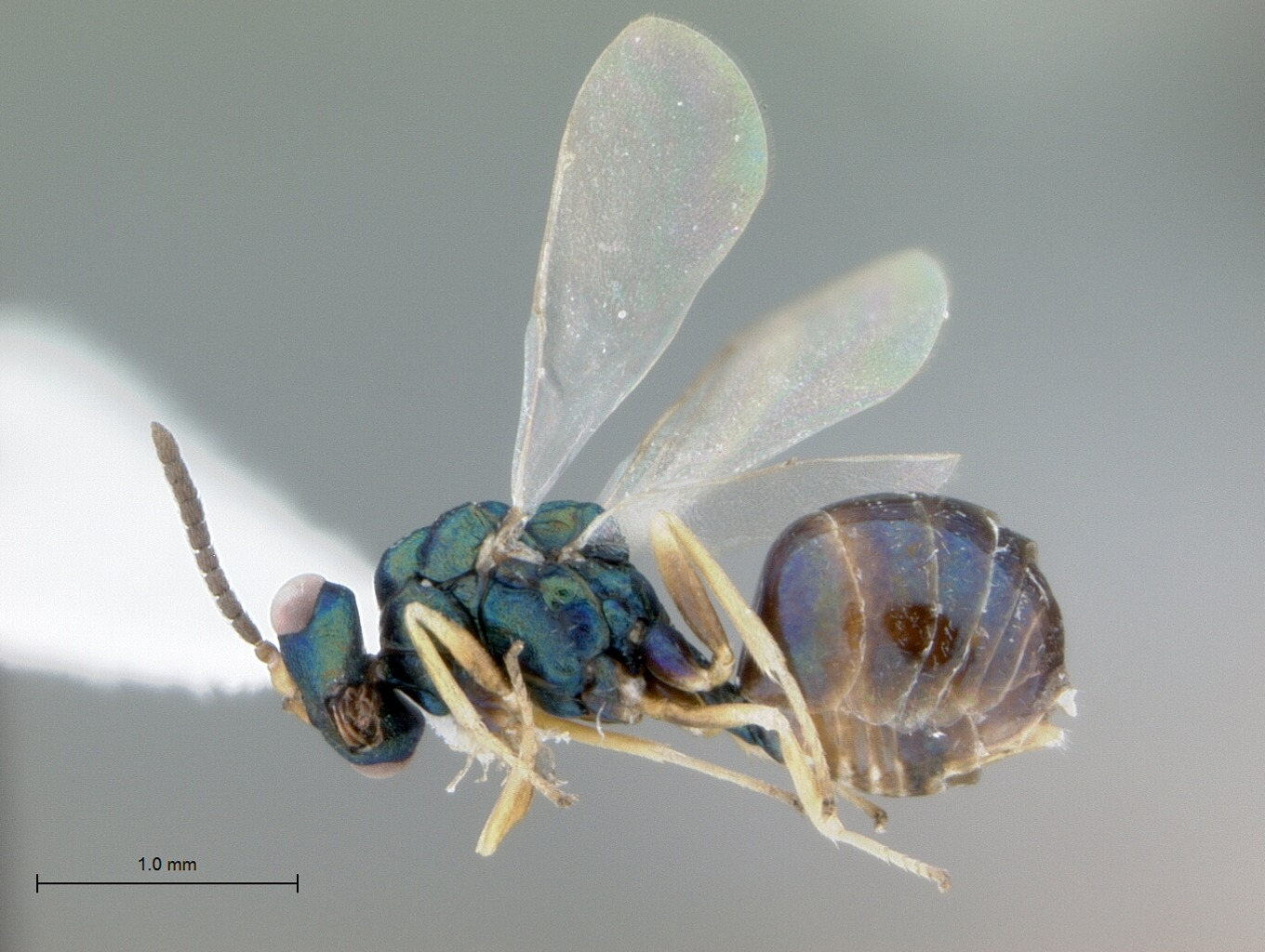
Orasema simplex from Argentina

Oraseminae are parasitic on the ant genus Pheidole (Myrmicinae), as well as the fire ant in southern South America and the little red fire ant in the Caribbean. They are distributed worldwide in tropical regions, such as Costa Rica, Ecuador, Brazil, and Argentina. They are also native to Texas, Florida, Massachusetts, Delaware, and Colorado.

An orasemine female punctures the plant tissue on which she will oviposit, and places an egg inside of each incision. The eggs are deposited on the edges of the underside of leaves, and are sometimes found in the buds and stems of the plant. They have been known to oviposit on blueberry leaves, tea leaves (Das), oak leaves, olive leaves, mango leaves, flower heads, and banana fingers. Species of Eucharitidae are consistent in their choice of leaf for oviposition.

Because orasemine eggs are laid on plants that are not always visited by foraging ants, the larvae will most often attach to intermediate hosts, or “insect prey” that will eventually be devoured by ants. Sometimes, however, foraging ants are present and there is no need for an intermediate host. Upon arriving at the ants’ brood, the larva burrows into the host's thorax and feeds there. The wasp feeds until the host larva pupates; after the host pupates, the wasp will resume feeding until it emerges from its host. The average time of development from planidia to adult is 29.5 days; the average pupal stage is 8.2 days.

Because orasemine larvae, pupae, and adults are easily distinguished from their host, the wasps disguise themselves by passively obtaining the odor of the fire ants. After a few days in the nest, the odor wears off and the ants begin to notice the wasps are not a part of their brood. At this point, the wasps leave the nest to mate and lay eggs. Though orasemines have a high fertility rate, only a small percentage of eggs survive to adulthood.

=== Eucharitinae ===
Eucharitinae are parasites of poneromorph ants, Ectatommatinae, Ponerinae, and Formicinae, although one genus from Australia is parasitic on the bulldog ant.

Female Eucharitinae bear up to 4500 eggs and begin oviposition soon after emerging from the nest. They deposit their eggs in groups of eight to 15 on plant buds, on the undersides of leaves or on fruit skin. Eucharitine larvae attach themselves to foraging ants and do not use an intermediate host. Some species of Eucharitinae, such as Kapala terminalis and other Kapala sp., have been known for their jumping capabilities. They stand erect on the plant on which they hatched, and without any distinguishable preparation, jump about 10 mm from the leaf onto a foraging ant. The larvae are external parasitoids of their hosts, and are not noticed due to their acquisition of the host’s odor. After the wasps are fully developed, they emerge in large numbers. The males swarm around the nest in wait of the females. Mating takes place immediately, and oviposition occurs soon after. A fossil genus, Palaeocharis is known from Eocene Baltic amber.

=== Gollumiellinae ===
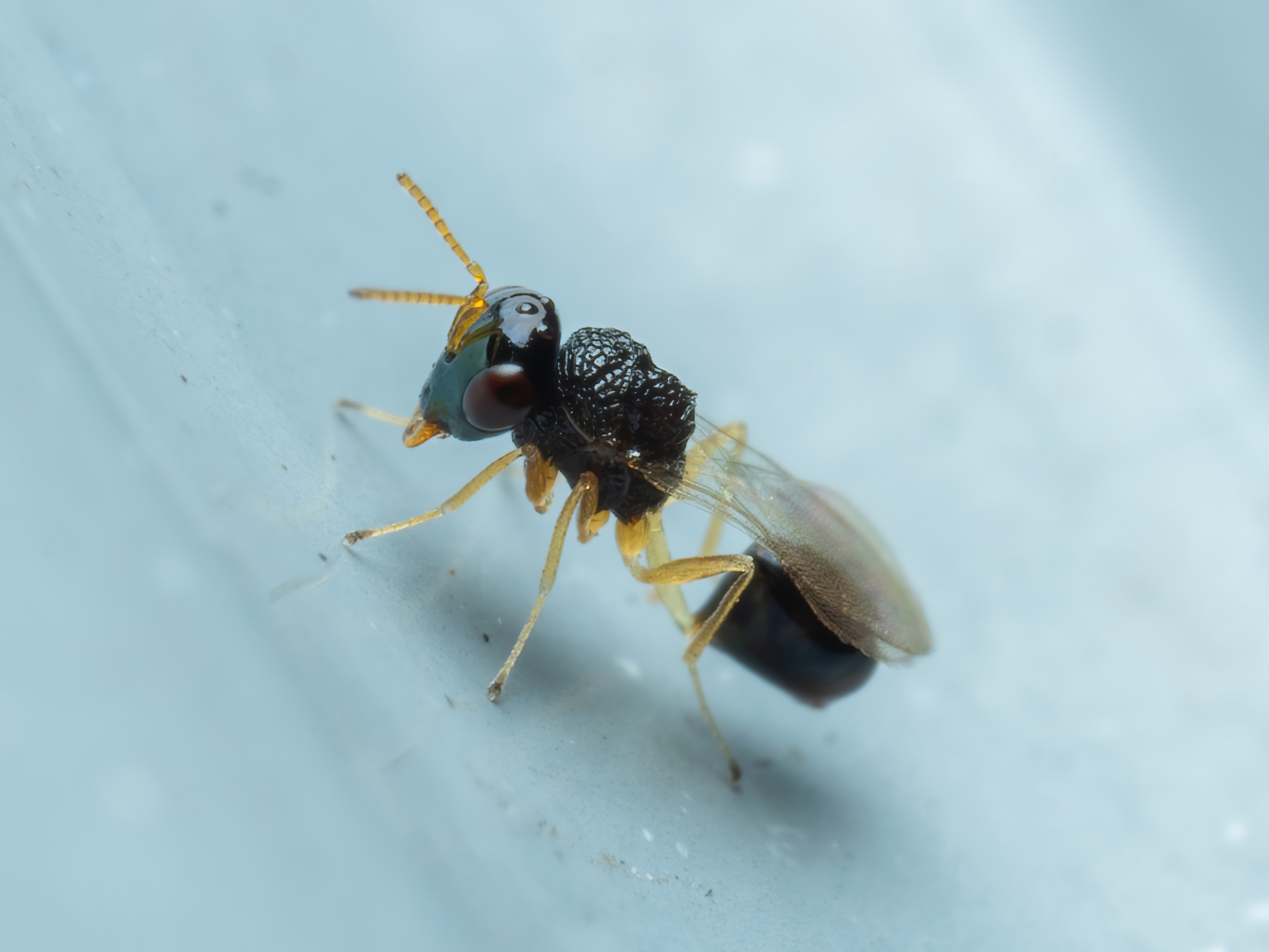
Gollumiella sp.

Gollumiellinae are unique in that they hook their eggs onto the plants and connect a ropey secretion to them, which stand erect. This acts as an attraction mechanism for Paratrechina ants. Gollumiellinae larvae burrow into the hosts' thoraces and feed there. The rest of its life cycle is similar to the aforementioned life cycle of eucharitids. Two Indo‐Pacific genera are included here:

- Anorasema Boucek, 1988
- Gollumiella Hedqvist, 1978

=== Akapalinae ===
This subfamily is monotypic, containing only the genus Akapala (Girault, 1934).

== Biological control ==
Eucharitids are candidates for biological control because each subfamily targets a specific ant genus. On the other hand, some eucharitids, including the genus Kapala, are classified as pests for several different reasons. First, a few days after oviposition occurs, the leaves dry up where each egg was located. Second, tea leaves with such marks reportedly do not have as strong of a flavor as tea leaves without these marks. Third, not all eucharitids have a significant effect on the size of their hosts' colony.

Orasema species are sometimes used as means of biological control for many ants, including the fire ant and little fire ant, because pesticides can cause damage to the environment, and they do not always work on fire ants. In addition, at least two eucharitid species groups are specialized parasites of these ants. Heraty stated, “Leaving aside the philosophical problems associated with introducing any organism for biological control, I believe that species of Orasema do have potential as biological control agents and deserve more study.”
