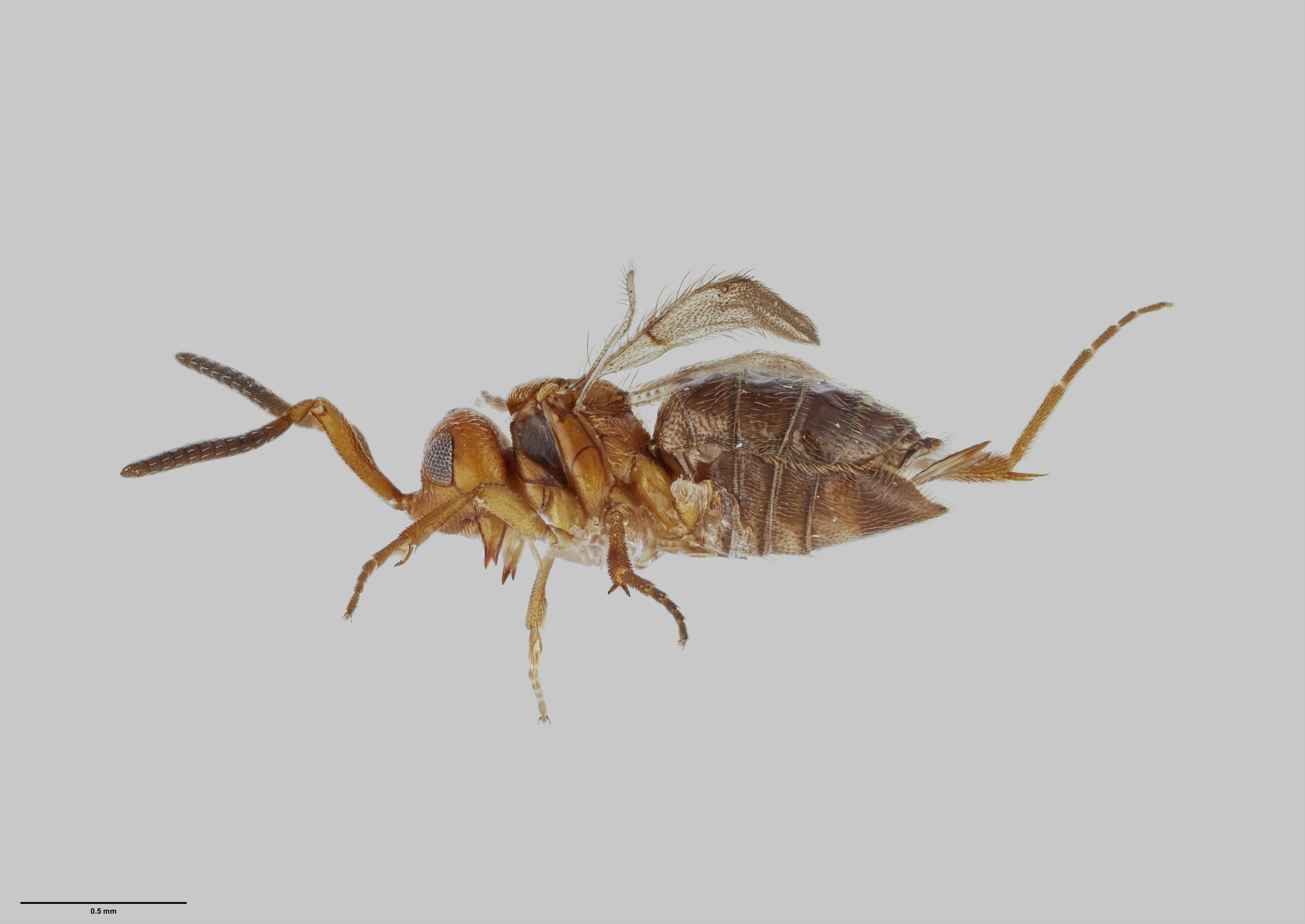
- Maaminga marrisi lateral view
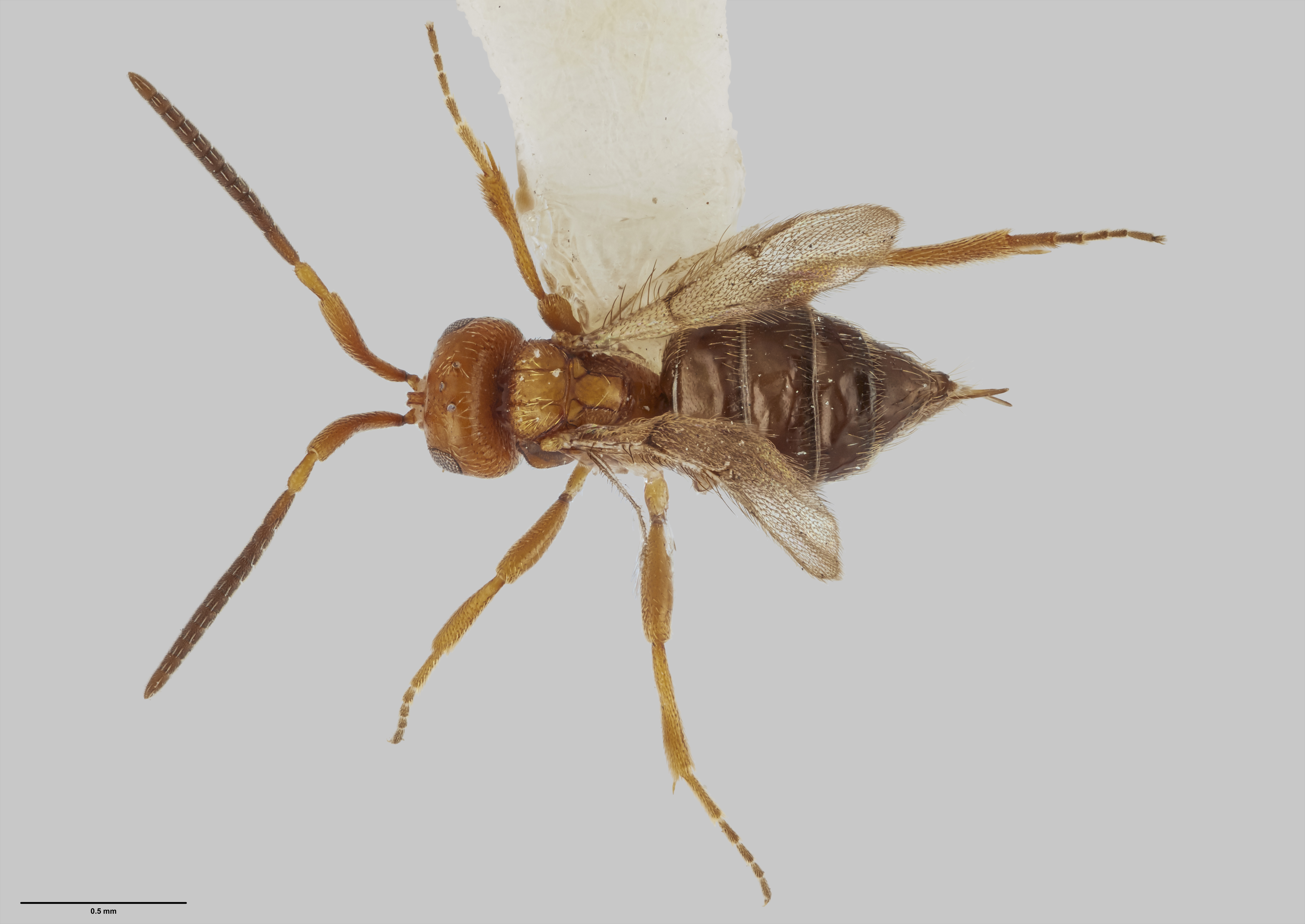
- Maaminga marrisi dorsal view

Scientific classification
- Kingdom: Animalia
- Phylum: Arthropoda
- Clade: Pancrustacea
- Class: Insecta
- Order: Hymenoptera
- Superfamily: Diaprioidea
- Family: Maamingidae; Early, Manser, Naumann, & Austin, 2001
- Genus: Maaminga

Species
- Maaminga marrisi Early, Manser, Naumann, & Austin, 2001; Maaminga rangi Early, Manser, Naumann, & Austin, 2001

= Maaminga =

Genus of wasps

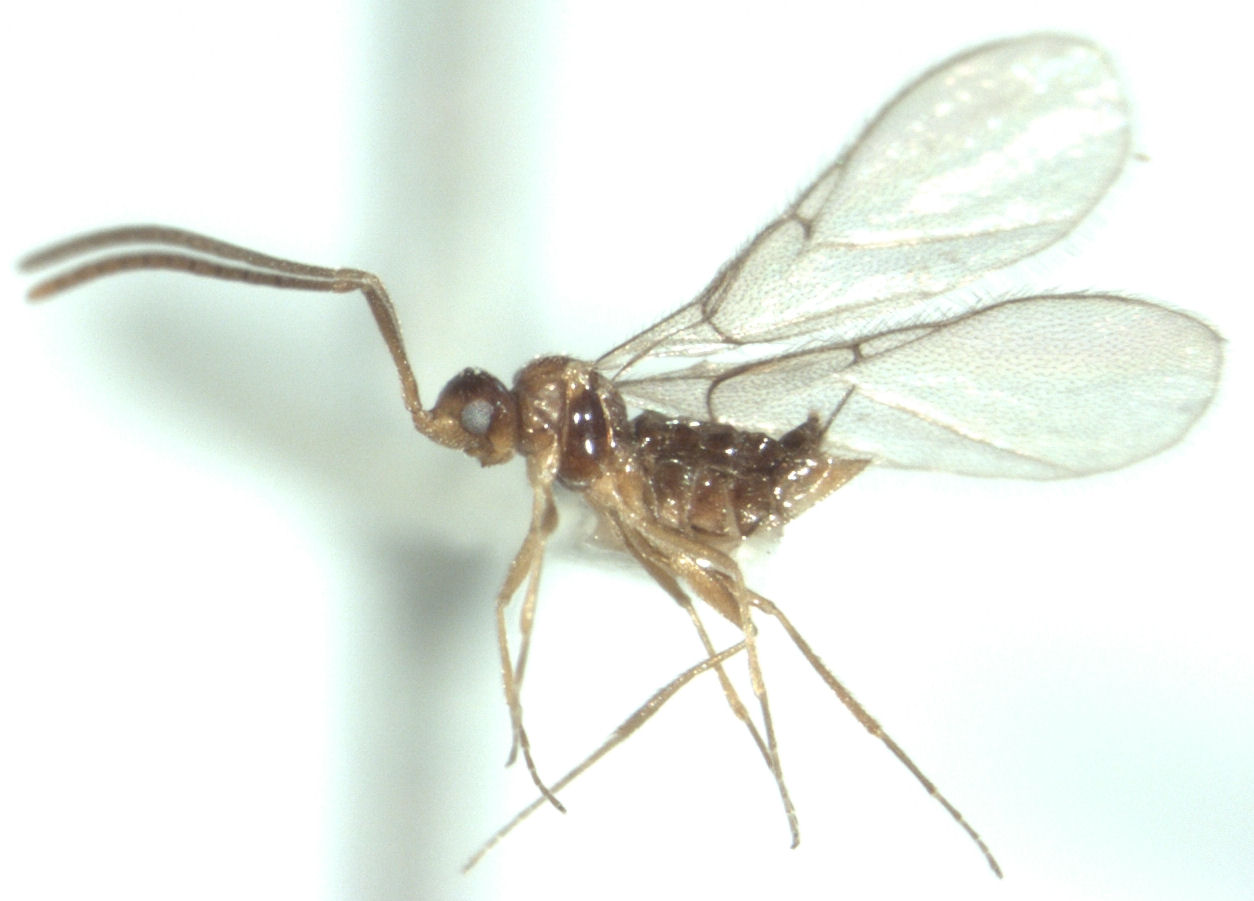
Maaminga rangi

Maaminga is a genus of parasitic wasps containing two species and constituting the family Maamingidae. So far only known from New Zealand, the two named species are Maaminga marrisi and M. rangi. The genus (and family) name derives from the Māori word "māminga", simply translated as "trickster" as the species evaded discovery for so long.

The delicate and slender Maaminga rangi is common in forests, particularly kauri forests of the northern part of the North Island. The more robust and stocky Maaminga marrisi, which is polymorphic for wing size (brachyterous, fully winged), appears to be associated with coastal scrub, and forest, particularly on offshore islands, but is also found in alpine snow tussock. Maamingidae was placed within the Proctotrupoidea, but was later moved to the superfamily Diaprioidea along with Diapriidae and Monomachidae.
