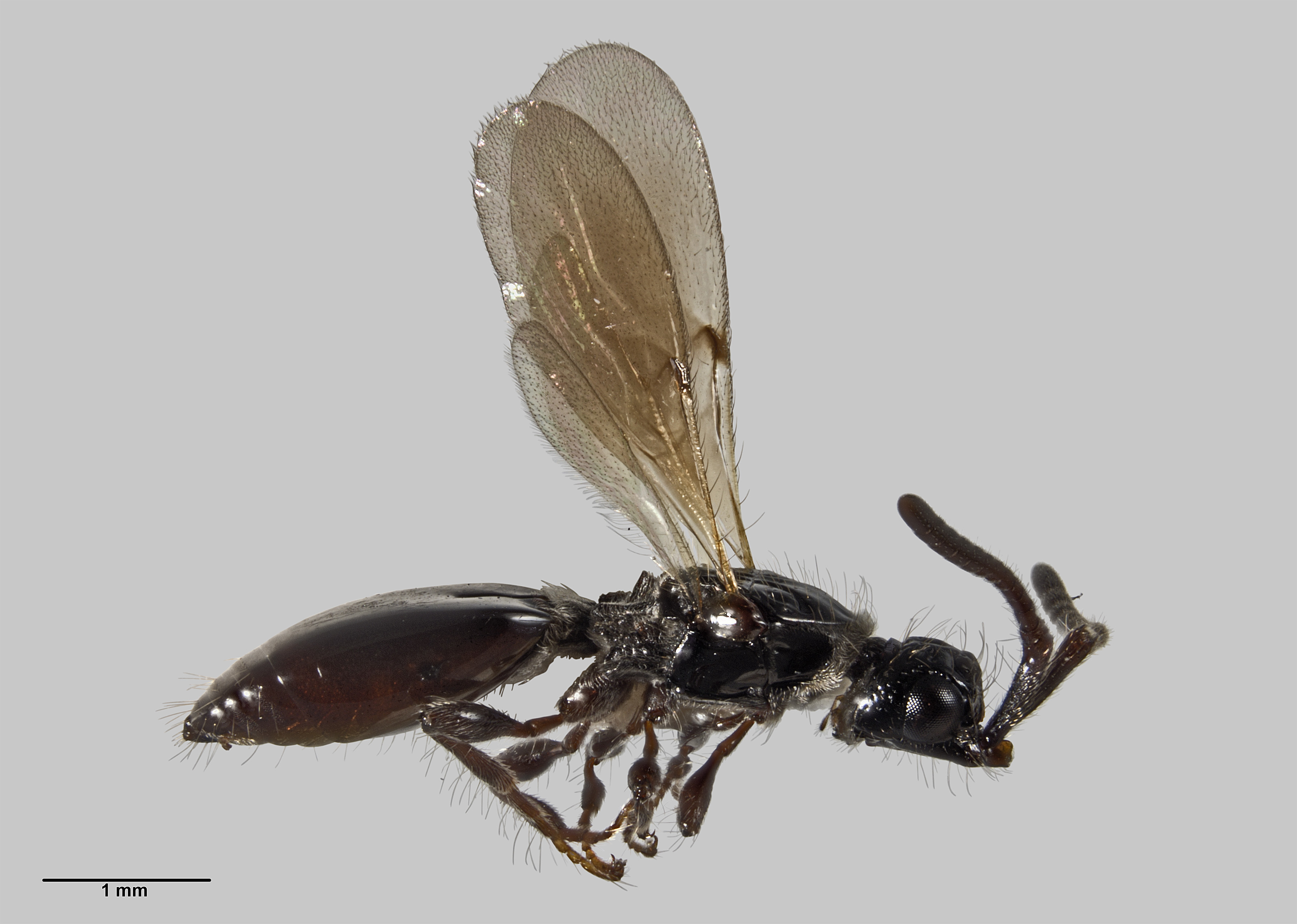
- Neurogalesus carinatus, a member of Diapriidae
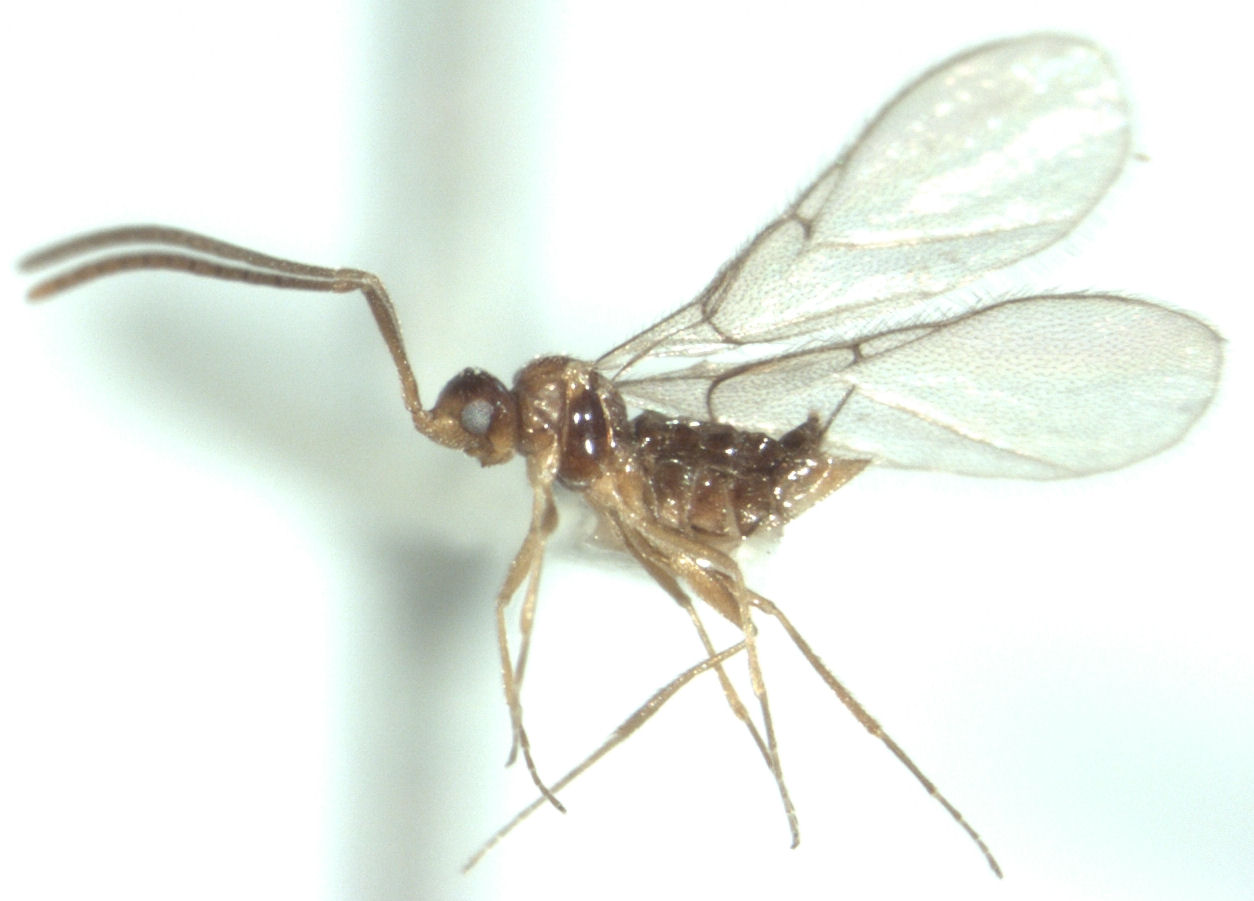
- Maaminga rangi, a member of Maamingidae

Scientific classification
- Kingdom: Animalia
- Phylum: Arthropoda
- Clade: Pancrustacea
- Class: Insecta
- Order: Hymenoptera
- Infraorder: Proctotrupomorpha
- Superfamily: Proctotrupoidea; Halliday, 1833

Families
- Diapriidae; Ismaridae; Maamingidae; Monomachidae; †Spathiopterygidae

= Diaprioidea =

Diaprioidea Temporal range: Berriasian–Recent

Superfamily of wasps

Diaprioidea is a hymenopteran superfamily containing four extant families; in the past these families were included in the superfamily Proctotrupoidea.

== Families ==
- Diapriidae has a cosmopolitan distribution with more than 1900 species in about 174 genera;
- Ismaridae has a single genus with a cosmopolitan distribution;
- Maamingidae has a single genus endemic to New Zealand;
- Monomachidae has two genera from Australia, New Guinea and South America;
- Spathiopterygidae† (extinct).
