= Myamaropsis =

Scientific classification
- Kingdom: Animalia
- Phylum: Arthropoda
- Class: Insecta
- Order: Hymenoptera
- Family: †Spathiopterygidae
- Family: †Myamaropsis; Engel & Ortega-Blanco in Engel, Ortega-Blanco, Soriano, Grimaldi & Martinez-Delclos, 2013
- Species: †M. turolensis

Binomial name
- †Myamaropsis turolensis Engel & Ortega-Blanco, 2013

Extinct genus of wasps

Myamaropsis is an extinct genus of wasp currently comprising a single species Myamaropsis turolensis.
