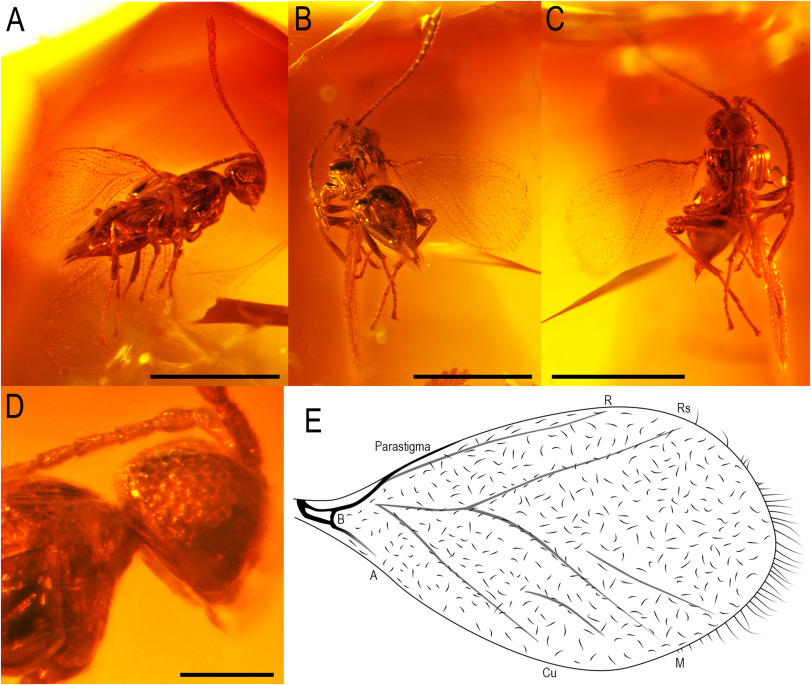
- Specimen of Spathiopteryx soosi

Scientific classification
- Kingdom: Animalia
- Phylum: Arthropoda
- Clade: Pancrustacea
- Class: Insecta
- Order: Hymenoptera
- Superfamily: Diaprioidea
- Family: †Spathiopterygidae; Engel & Ortega-Blanco in Engel, Ortega-Blanca, Soriano, Grimaldi & Martinez-Delclos, 2013

Genera
- See text

= Spathiopterygidae =

Spathiopterygidae Temporal range: Barremian–Santonian

Extinct family of wasps

Spathiopterygidae is an extinct family of small parasitic wasps, known from the Cretaceous (Barremian to Santonian) of Laurasia and Northern Gondwana. They are suggested to be members of Diaprioidea, in part due to their similarly reduced wing venation. Some members of the group reduced or lost the hindwings entirely.

== Genera ==
- †Myamaropsis Engel & Ortega-Blanco in Engel, Ortega-Blanco, Soriano, Grimaldi & Martinez-Delclos, 2013
  - M. baabdaensis Krogmann et al. 2016 Barremian, Lebanese amber
  - M. turolensis Engel & Ortega-Blanco in Engel, Ortega-Blanco, Soriano, Grimaldi & Martinez-Delclos, 2013 Albian, San Just amber, Escucha Formation (Spanish amber)
- †Spathiopteryx Engel & Ortega-Blanco in Engel, Ortega-Blanco, Soriano, Grimaldi & Martinez-Delclos, 2013
  - S. alavarommopsis Engel, Ortega-Blanco & Grimaldi in Engel, Ortega-Blanco, Soriano, Grimaldi & Martinez-Delclos, 2013 Albian, Alava amber, Escucha Formation (Spanish amber)
  - S. soosi Szabó, Brazidec & Perrichot, 2022 Santonian, Ajka Coal Formation, Hungary
- †Spathopria Engel, Ortega-Blanco & Grimaldi in Engel, Ortega-Blanco, Soriano, Grimaldi & Martinez-Delclos, 2013
  - S. sayrevillensis Engel, Ortega-Blanco & Grimaldi in Engel, Ortega-Blanco, Soriano, Grimaldi & Martinez-Delclos, 2013 Turonian, New Jersey amber
- †Diaspathion Engel and Huang, 2015
  - D. ortegai Engel and Huang, 2015 Cenomanian, Burmese amber
- †Diameneura Santer and Álvarez-Parra, 2022
  - D. marveni Santer and Álvarez-Parra, 2022 late Albian, Spanish amber
