= Cretapria =

Cretapria Temporal range: Aptian–Cretaceous

Scientific classification
- Kingdom: Animalia
- Phylum: Arthropoda
- Clade: Pancrustacea
- Class: Insecta
- Order: Hymenoptera
- Family: Ismaridae
- Genus: †Cretapria; Fujiyama, 1994
- Species: †C. tsukadai

Binomial name
- †Cretapria tsukadai Fujiyama, 1994

Extinct genus of wasps

Cretapria is a genus of parasitic wasps under the family Ismaridae. It contains only one species, Cretapria tsukadai. Its fossils were found in Choshi amber.
