= Spathiopteryx =

Scientific classification
- Kingdom: Animalia
- Phylum: Arthropoda
- Class: Insecta
- Order: Hymenoptera
- Family: †Spathiopterygidae
- Genus: †Spathiopteryx; Engel & Ortega-Blanco in Engel, Ortega-Blanco, Soriano, Grimaldi & Martinez-Delclos, 2013
- Species: †S. alavarommopsis

Binomial name
- †Spathiopteryx alavarommopsis Engel & Ortega-Blanco, 2013

Extinct genus of wasps

Spathiopteryx is an extinct genus of wasp currently comprises a single species Spathiopteryx alavarommopsis.
