= Spathopria =

Scientific classification
- Kingdom: Animalia
- Phylum: Arthropoda
- Class: Insecta
- Order: Hymenoptera
- Family: †Spathiopterygidae
- Genus: †Spathopria; Engel, Ortega-Blanco & Grimaldi, 2013
- Species: †S. sayrevillensis

Binomial name
- †Spathopria sayrevillensis Engel, Ortega-Blanco & Grimaldi, 2013

Extinct genus of wasps

Spathopria is an extinct genus of wasp currently comprising a single species Spathopria sayrevillensis.
