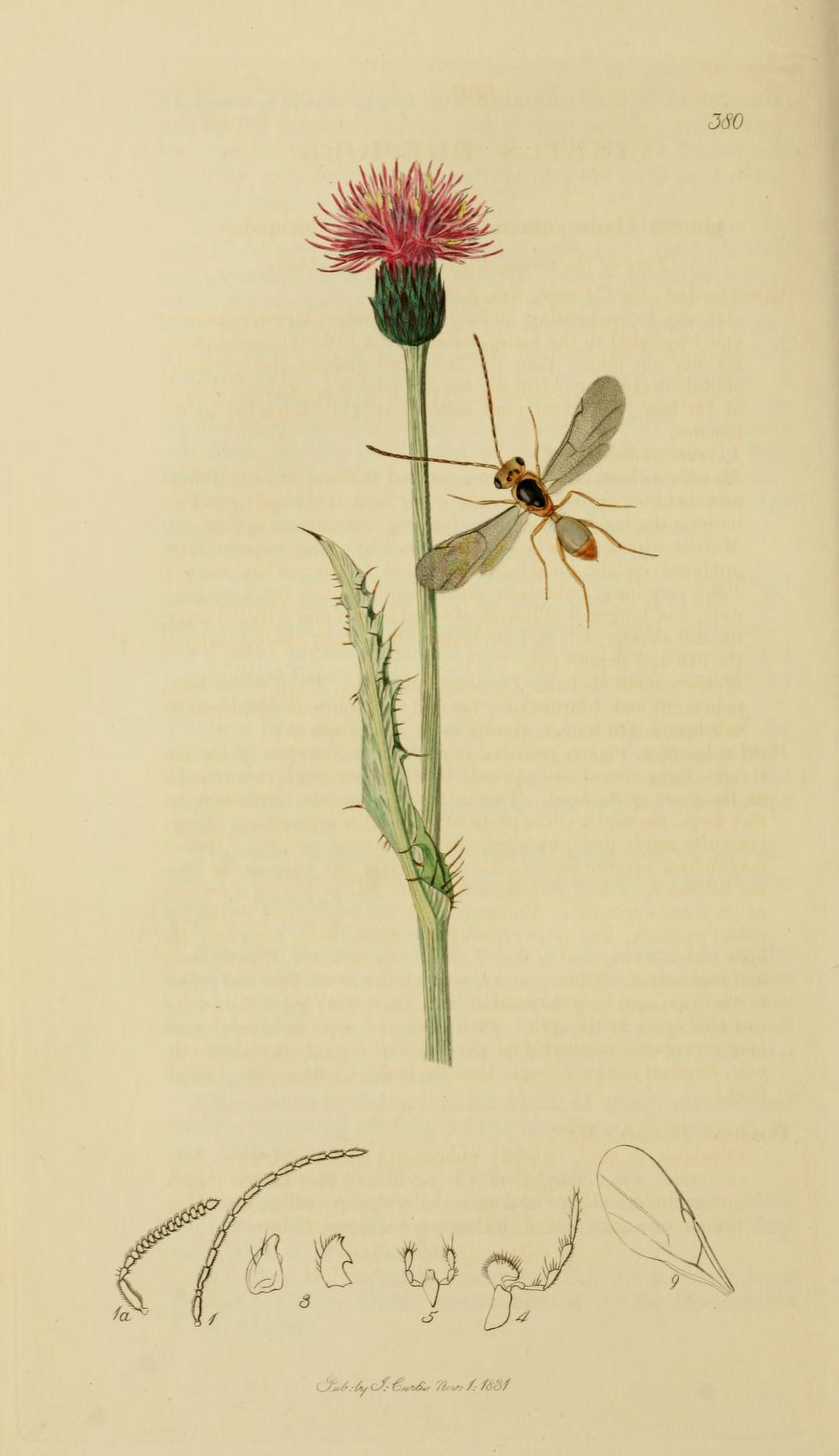
- Ismarus dorsiger illustration from British Entomology

Scientific classification
- Kingdom: Animalia
- Phylum: Arthropoda
- Class: Insecta
- Order: Hymenoptera
- Superfamily: Diaprioidea
- Family: Ismaridae; Thomson, 1858

Genera
- Ismarus Haliday, 1835; †Cretapria Fujiyama, 1994

= Ismaridae =

Family of wasps

Ismaridae is a family of wasps belonging to the order Hymenoptera. It contains the singular relictual genus Ismarus, which has about 50 known species. All species for which the biology is known appear to be hyperparasitoids that parasitize Dryinidae (that attack leafhoppers).

This lineage was formerly included in the family Diapriidae, as the subfamily Ismarinae, but differ from diapriid wasps by lacking a facial projection from which the antenna arise, and are characterized by various degrees of fusion of the metasomal terga. The family historically included another genus, Szelenyioprioides, but it was synonymized with the diapriid genus Spilomicrus.

== Gallery ==
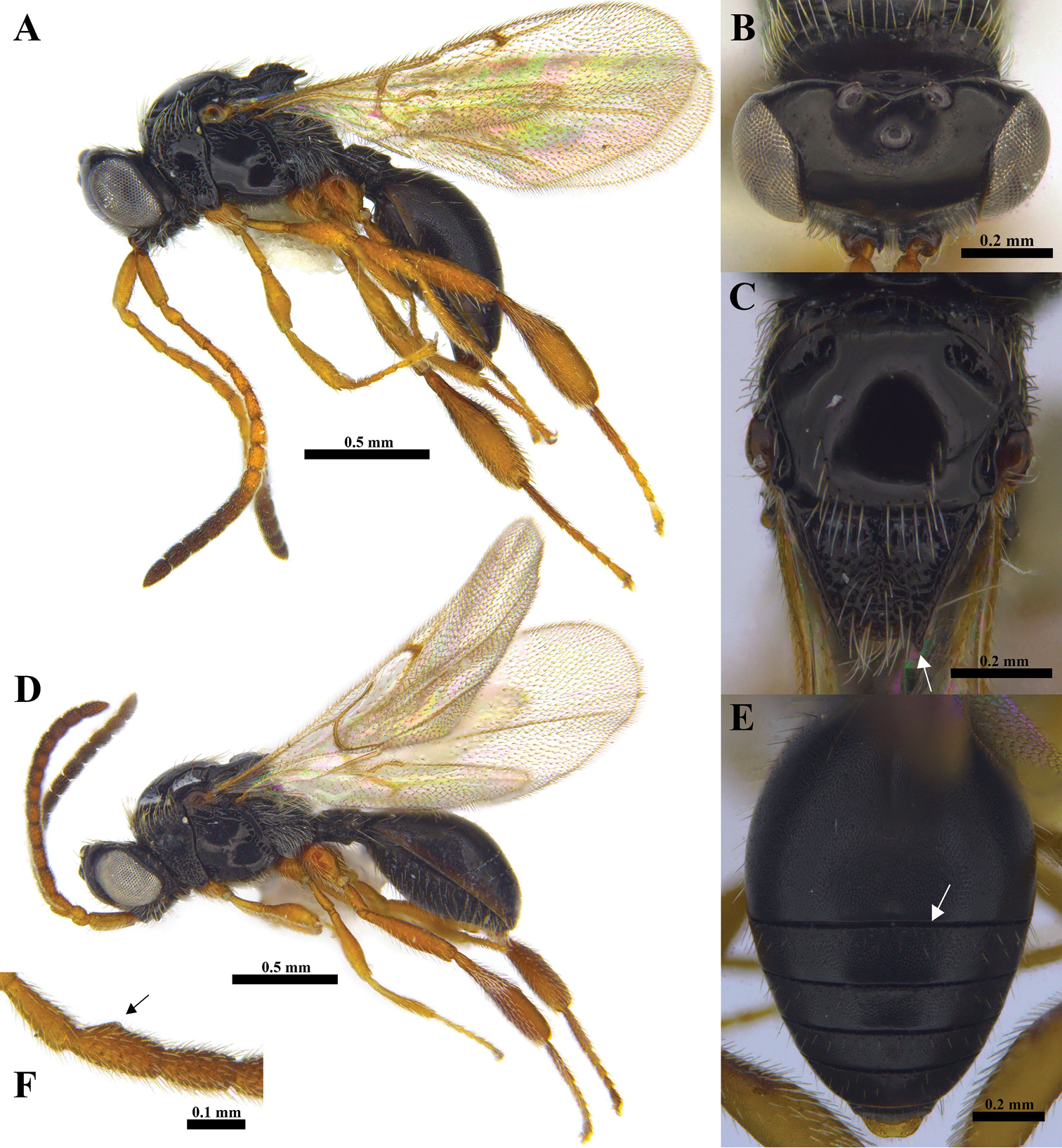
Ismarus africanus

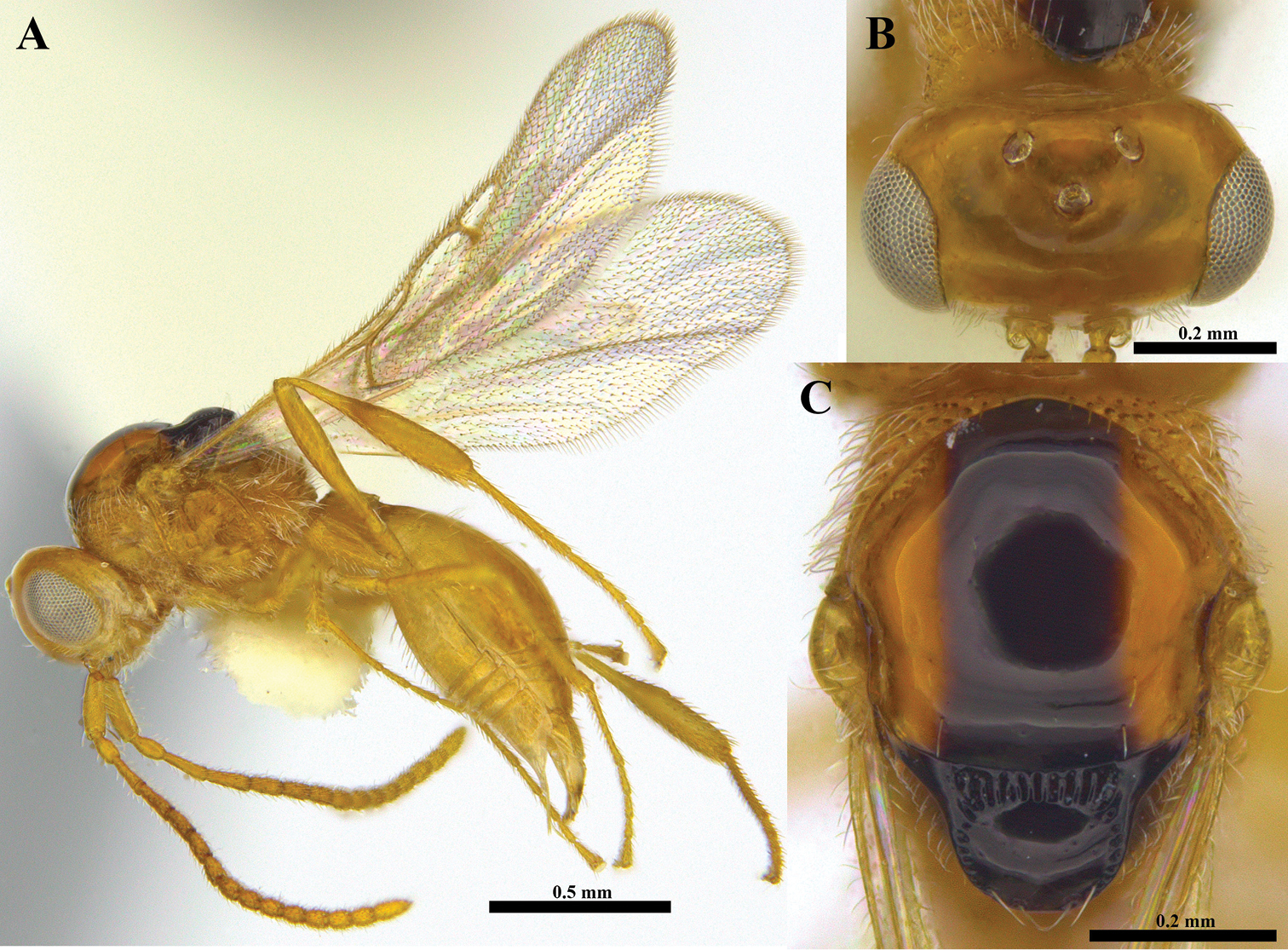
Ismarus nigrofasciatus

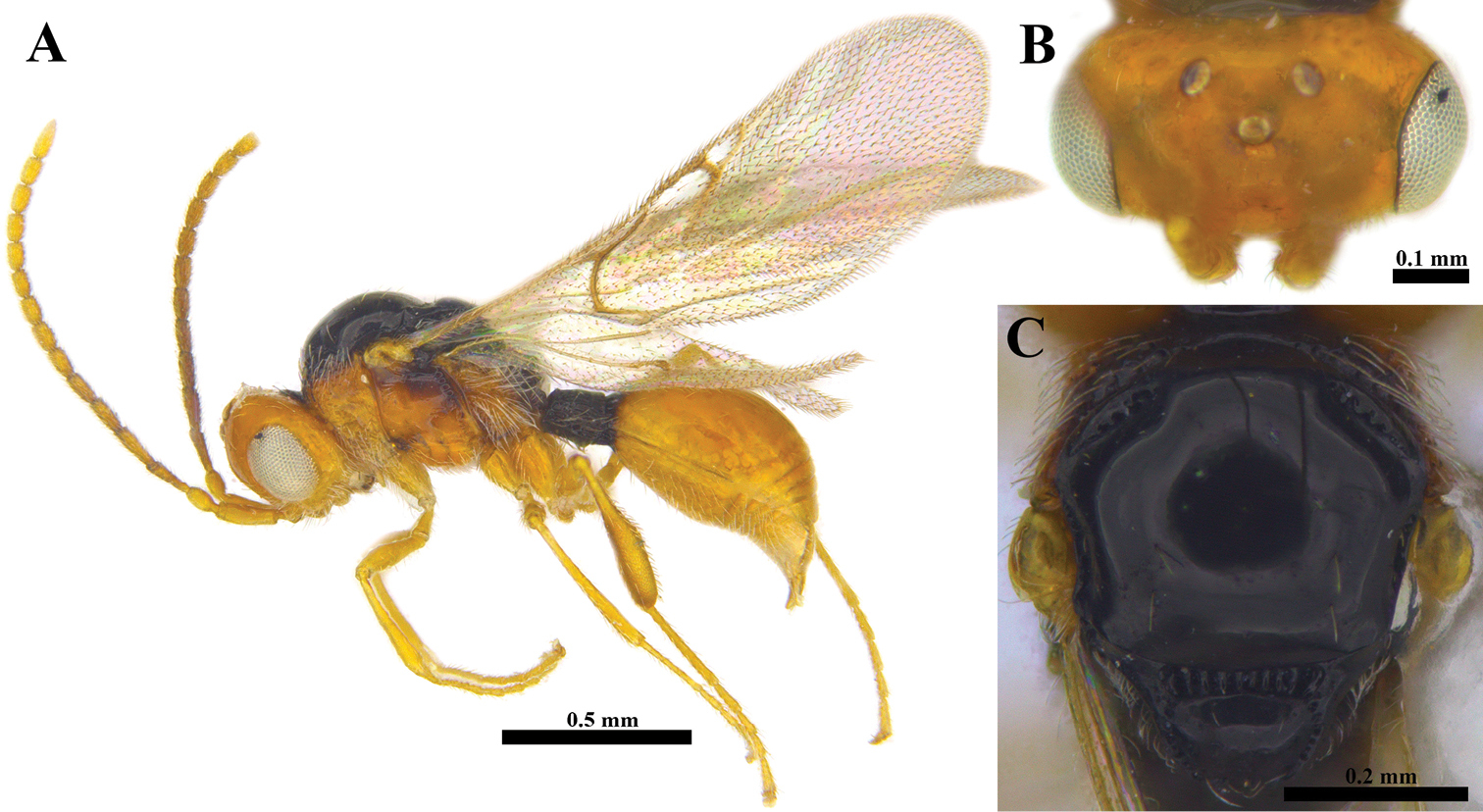
Ismarus notaulicus

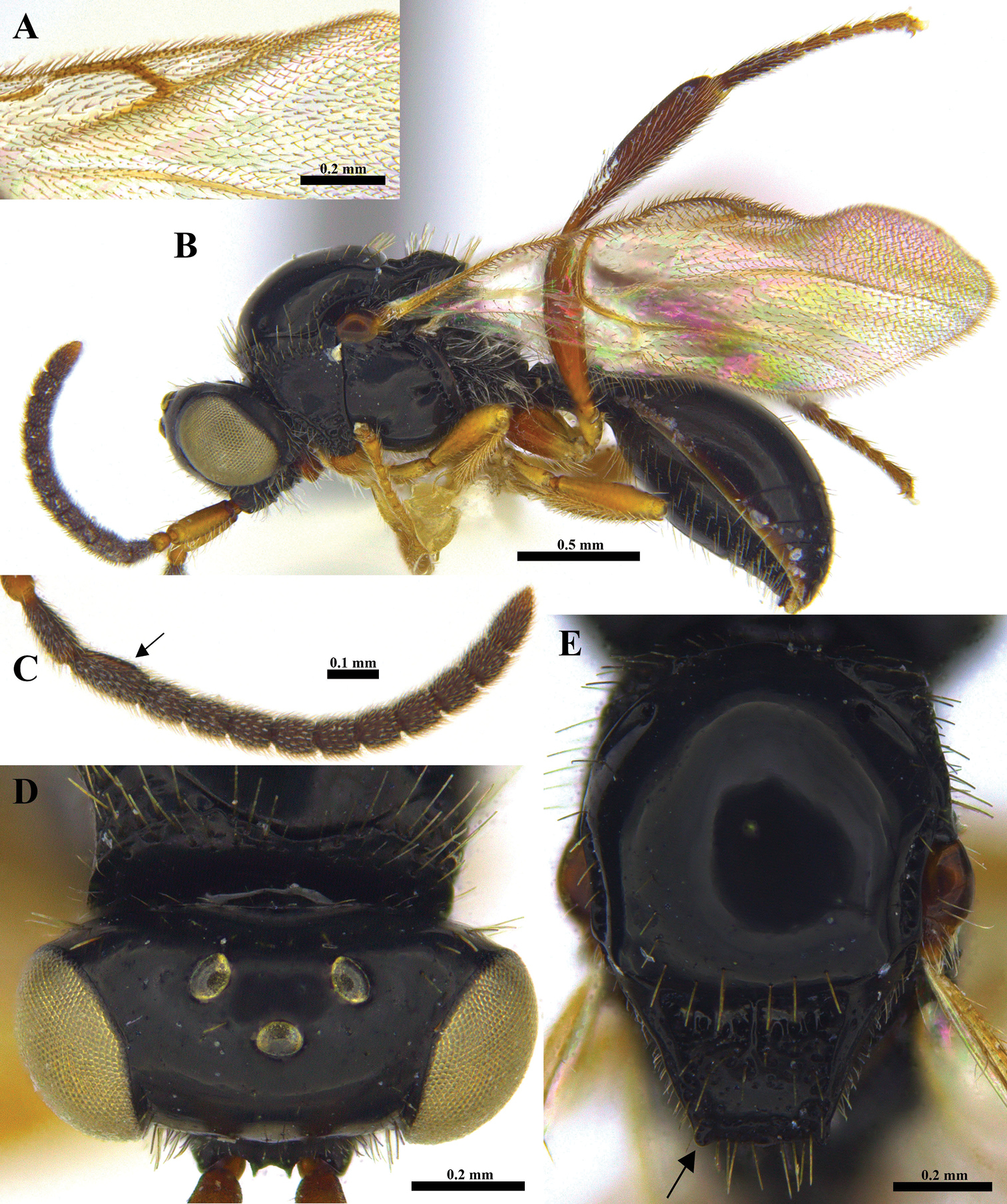
Ismarus steineri
