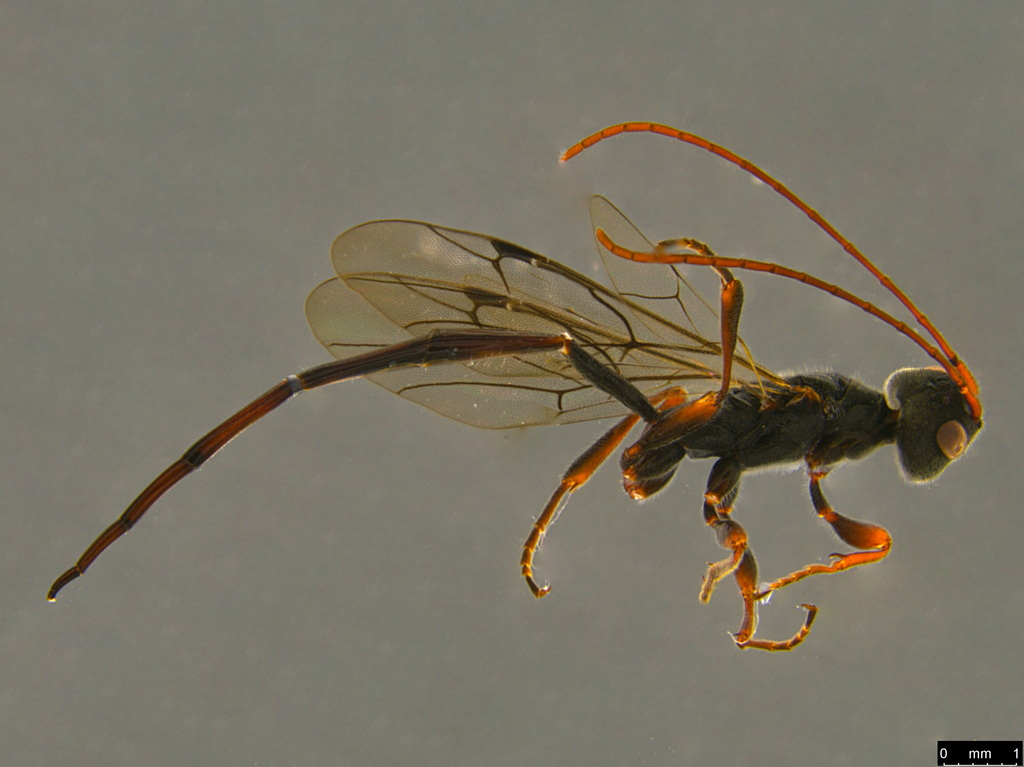
- Monomachus antipodalis

Scientific classification
- Kingdom: Animalia
- Phylum: Arthropoda
- Clade: Pancrustacea
- Class: Insecta
- Order: Hymenoptera
- Superfamily: Proctotrupoidea
- Family: Monomachidae; Ashmead, 1902

= Monomachidae =

Family of wasps

Monomachidae is a family of parasitoid wasps in the order Hymenoptera comprising two genera. The species of the family are found in the Southern Hemisphere, primarily in the tropics of the New World with a few from Australia and New Guinea.

== Description ==
Species of the family Monomachidae are generally 9.5-11.2 mm in length, occupy a range of colors, and are sexually dimorphic. Females have a long, tapered metasoma of a sickle-shape, while in males the metasoma is thinner and elongated. Both sexes have large, unique mandibles which are diverse in shape throughout the family.

== Behavior ==
Males and females of species in the family Monomachidae engage in different behaviors as adults. While males may fly in swarms in search of females, females will fly closer to the soil in search of hosts.

Known hosts of Monomachidae species are primarily flies, including species of the genus Boreoides and Chiromyza vittata.

== Genera ==
The following genera are recognised in the family Monomachidae:

- Chasca Johnson & Musetti, 2012
- Monomachus Klug, 1841
