= Prussian Formation =

Geologic formation in Prussia

- Stratigraphic range: Priabonian
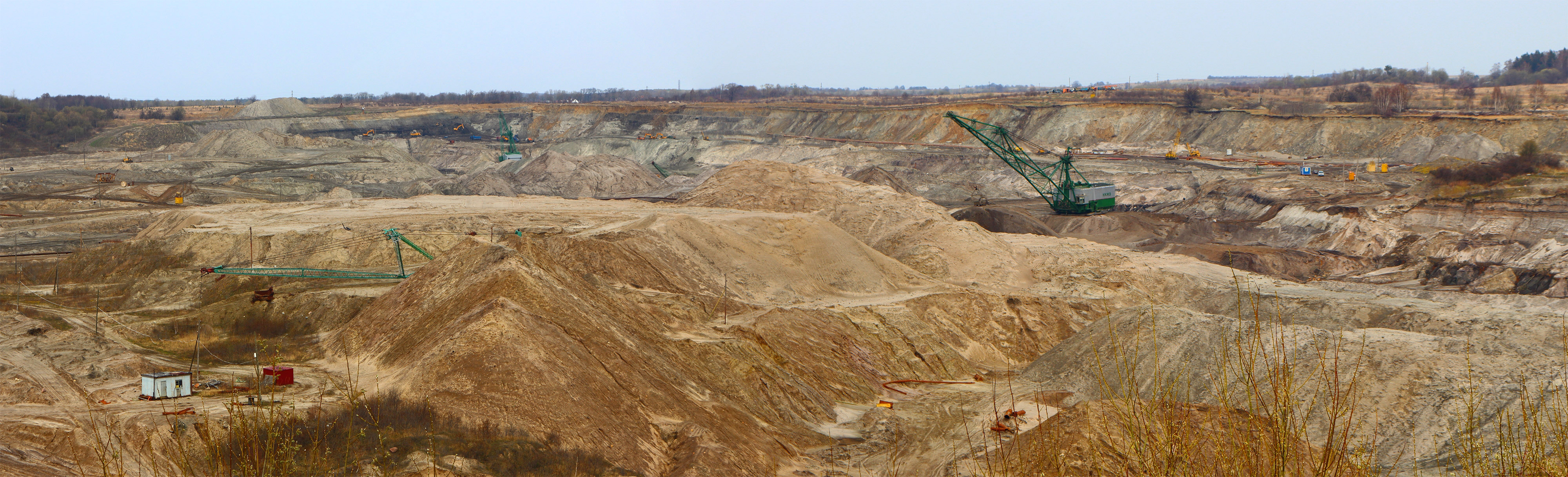
- Outcrop of the Prussian Formation in Yantarny, Russia
- Type: Geological formation
- Sub-units: Blue Earth Member; White Wall Member; Upper Quicksand Member
- Underlies: Palvé Formation
- Overlies: Alka Formation
- Thickness: up to 16 metres (52 ft)

Lithology
- Primary: Phosphorite, amber, glauconite, clay
- Other: Quartz, feldspar

Location
- Location: Kaliningrad Oblast
- Country: Russia

Type section
- Named for: Prussia
- Region: Sambian Peninsula

The Prussian Formation, previously known as the Amber Formation, is a geologic formation in Prussia, today mostly Kaliningrad Oblast, that dates to the Eocene. It holds 90% of the world's amber supply and Baltic amber is found exclusively in the Prussian Formation.

The Prussian Formation is equivalent to the Obukhov Formation of Ukraine and Belarus.

== History ==
Baltic amber was first collected during the Bronze Age around 1700 BC and it was traded along the Amber Road with evidence of the amber being processed across workshops along the Vistula and Oder where it was transported for use across Europe with evidence found in Šventoji, Lithuania, the Curonian Spit, and Mycenaean Greece.

During the 13th century, the Teutonic Order established a monopoly on the Baltic amber trade and they outlawed the unauthorised collection of the amber by assigning the illegal collection of Baltic amber to the death penalty as it became state property; the first documented large-scale mining of the Prussian Formation took place during the 14th century. The amber was at the disposal of the owner of Lochstedt Castle, the “Bernsteinmeister”, and the mining operations intensified after the Teutonic Order was secularized in 1525.

Starting from the 18th century, the mining operations at the Prussian Formation became regulated, and Stantien & Becker opened the Yantarny mine around 1858 to the benefit of nearby towns such as Königsberg. Also in the 1850s, Heinrich Ernst Beyrich became the first to map the geology of the area, and Georg Giebel studied the arthropod genera found within the Baltic amber. By 1874, Beyrich determined the area was Eocene in age.

In the early 20th century, Theodore D. A. Cockerell and William Morton Wheeler studied the bee and ant genera found in the Baltic amber. Poinar Jr. (1992) studied preservation biases in the formation.

== Geology ==
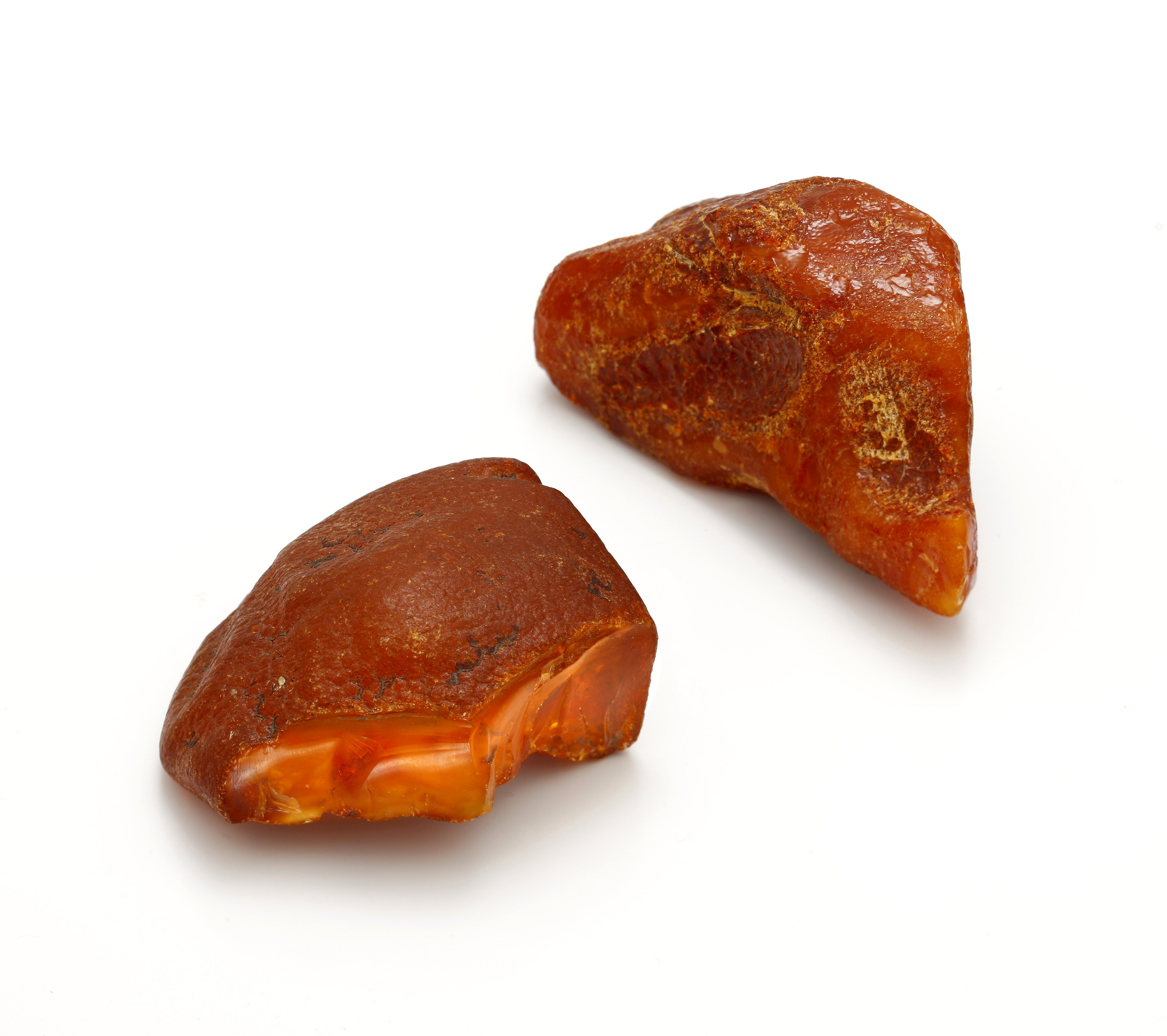
Baltic amber from the Prussian Formation

In situ Baltic amber is found within the Prussian Formation and it is exposed in the northern part of the Sambia Peninsula in Kaliningrad and it overlies the Alka Formation and underlies the Palvé Formation.

The Prussian Formation is up to 16 metres (52 ft) thick in its type section and has multiple sub-units. The lowermost unit is the Blue Earth Member which is up to 15 metres (49 ft) thick and is the main amber bearing horizon, so named due to its glauconite content. The White Wall Member overlies this, and it is made from more consolidated calcareous layers with a reduced glauconite content reaching up to 5 metres (16 ft) in thickness. The uppermost unit is the Upper Quicksand Member with fine to medium-grained sands up to 4 metres (13 ft) thick with only minor concentrations of amber.

=== Age ===
Different authors have given estimates of 47–40 Ma and 43–35 Ma as the age of the Prussian Formation. Iakovleva et al. (2022) used dinoflagellate cysts from Primorsky quarry to date the Prussian Formation to the Priabonian.

== Paleogeography ==
The Baltic amber likely originated from the proto-Scandinavian highlands and was fluvially deposited in a coastal lagoon environment which is today the Prussian Formation as evidenced by the presence of glauconite.

== Paleobiology ==
Numerous extinct genera and species of plants and animals have been discovered and scientifically described from inclusions in the Prussian Formation. Inclusions of insects make up over 98% of the animals preserved in the amber, while all other arthropods, annelids, molluscs, nematodes, protozoans contribute less than 0.5% of the animals. Vertebrates are another 0.5% of the animals included and mostly are represented by mammal fur, feathers, and reptiles. Dinoflagellates are also known.

=== Flora ===
Name	Authors	Year	Family	Notes	Images
Notoscyphus balticus	Heinrichs et al	2015	Geocalycaceae	A liverwort	
Rhizomnium dentatum	Heinrichs et al	2014	Mniaceae	A bryopsid moss	

=== Fauna ===
- Agroecomyrmex Wheeler, 1910
- Aphaenogaster mersa Wheeler, 1915
- Aphaenogaster oligocenica Wheeler, 1915
- Aphaenogaster sommerfeldti (Mayr, 1868)
- Arostropsis Yunakov & Kirejtshuk, 2011
- Aspidopleura Gibson, 2009
- Asymphylomyrmex Wheeler, 1915
- Balticopta gusakovi Balashov & Perkovsky, 2020
- Baltimartyria Skalski, 1995
- Baltocteniza Eskov & Zonstein, 2000
- Brevivulva Gibson, 2009
- Deinodryinus areolatus (Ponomarenko, 1975)
- Deinodryinus velteni Guglielmino & Olmi, 2011
- Diochus electrus Chatzimanolis & Engel, 2011
- Electrinocellia (Carpenter) Engel, 1995
- Electrocteniza Eskov & Zonstein, 2000
- Electropodagrion Azar & Nel, 2008
- Electrostephanus Brues, 1933
- Elektrithone Makarkin, Wedmann, & Weiterschan, 2014
- Eogeometer vadens Fischer, Michalski & Hausmann, 2019
- Epiborkhausenites Skalski, 1973
- Glisachaemus Szwedo, 2007
- Gracillariites Kozlov, 1987
- Metanephrocerus collini Carpenter & Hull, 1939
- Metanephrocerus groehni Kehlmaier & Skevington, 2014
- Metanephrocerus hoffeinsorum Kehlmaier & Skevington, 2014
- Electrocrania Kuznezov, 1941
- Fibla carpenteri Engel, 1995
- Metapelma archetypon Gibson, 2009
- Micropterix gertraudae Kurz & Kurz, 2010
- Mindarus harringtoni (Hele, 2008)
- Neanaperiallus Gibson, 2009
- Palaeovespa baltica Cockerell, 1909
- Palaeovespa socialis Pionar, 2005
- Prolyonetia Kusnetzov, 1941
- Propupa Stworzewicz & Pokryszko, 2006
- Pseudogarypus synchrotron Henderickx, 2012
- Stigmellites baltica (Kozlov, 1988) (Lepidopteran leaf mines)
- Xylolaemus sakhnovi Alekseev & Lord, 2014
- Succinipatopsis Poinar, 2000
- Yantarogekko balticus Bauer et al., 2005
- Yantaromyrmex constricta (Mayr, 1868)
- Yantaromyrmex geinitzi (Mayr, 1868)
- Yantaromyrmex samlandica (Wheeler, 1915)
