= List of Ctenizidae species =

This page lists all described species of the spider family Ctenizidae accepted by the World Spider Catalog as of December 2020:

== † Baltocteniza ==
† Baltocteniza Eskov and Zonstein, 2000

- † B. kulickae Eskov and Zonstein, 2000

== Cteniza ==
Cteniza

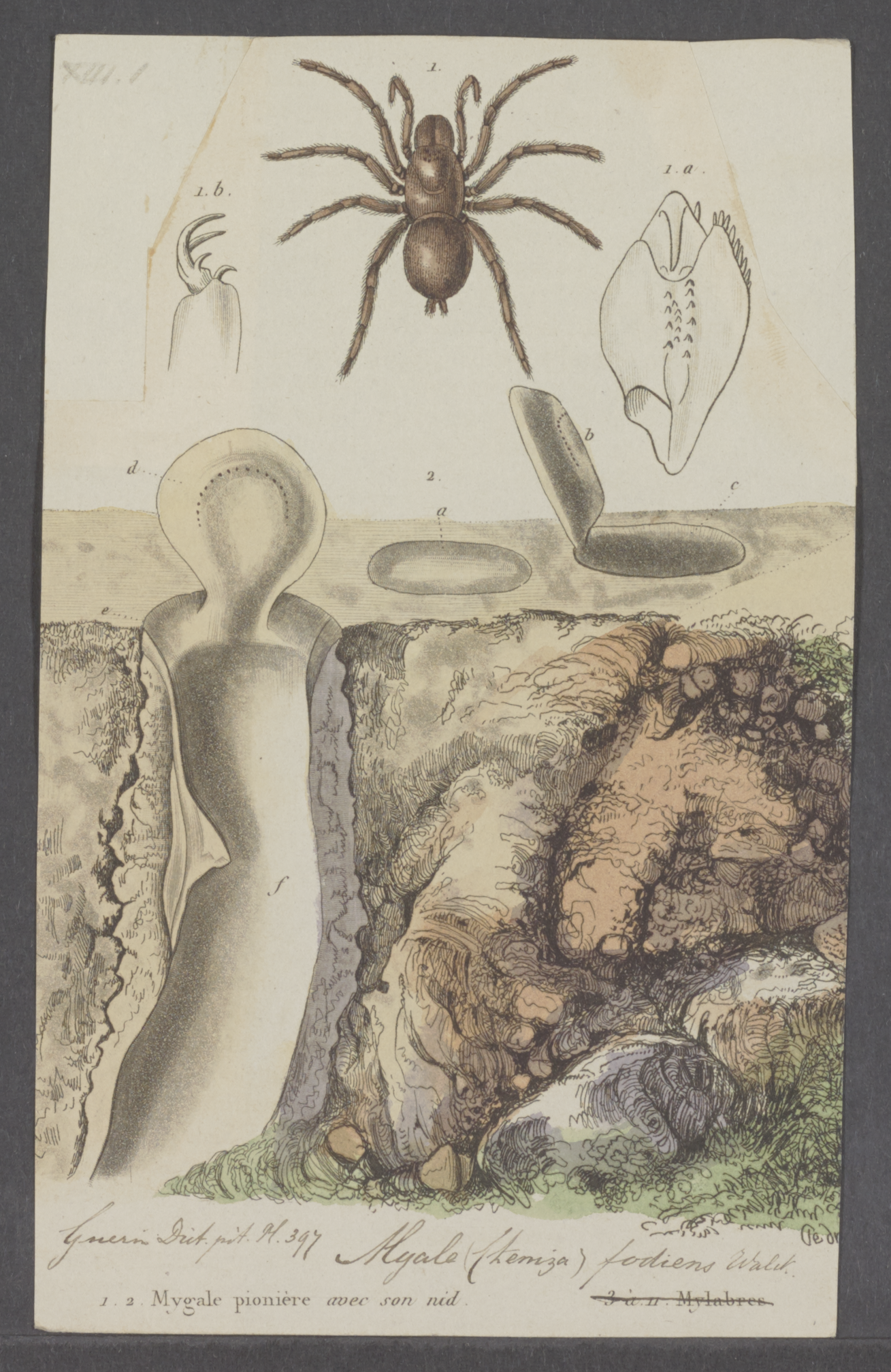
Cteniza moggridgei

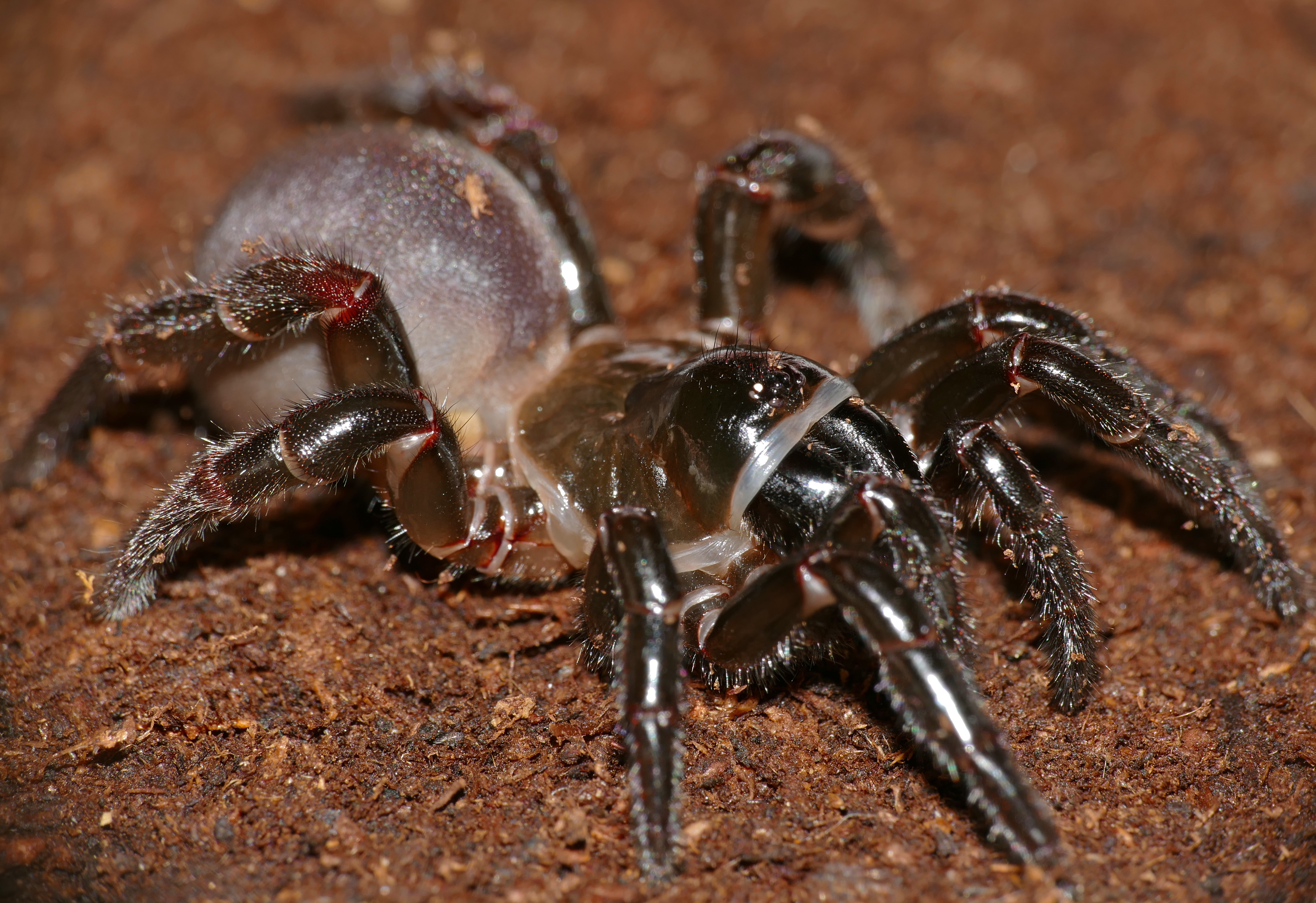
Cteniza sauvagesi

Cteniza Latreille, 1829

- C. genevieveae Canard, 2018 — France (Corsica)
- C. moggridgei O. Pickard-Cambridge, 1874 — France, Italy
- C. sauvagesi (Rossi, 1788) (type) — France (Corsica), Italy

== Cyrtocarenum ==
Cyrtocarenum Ausserer, 1871

- C. cunicularium (Olivier, 1811) (type) — Greece (incl. Crete, Rhodes), Turkey
- C. grajum (C. L. Koch, 1836) — Greece

== † Electrocteniza ==
† Electrocteniza Eskov and Zonstein, 2000

- † E. sadilenkoi Eskov and Zonstein, 2000
