= 1915 in paleontology =

Paleontology or palaeontology is the study of prehistoric life forms on Earth through the examination of plant and animal fossils. This includes the study of body fossils, tracks (ichnites), burrows, cast-off parts, fossilised feces (coprolites), palynomorphs and chemical residues. Because humans have encountered fossils for millennia, paleontology has a long history both before and after becoming formalized as a science. This article records significant discoveries and events related to paleontology that occurred or were published in the year 1915.

== Arthropods ==
=== Newly named insects ===
Name	Novelty	Status	Authors	Age	Unit	Location	Notes	Images
Aphaenogaster mersa	Sp nov	valid	Wheeler	Lutetian	Baltic amber	Russia	Fossil myrmicin ant.	Aphaenogaster mersa
Aphaenogaster oligocenica	Sp nov	valid	Wheeler	Lutetian	Baltic amber	Russia	Fossil myrmicin ant.	Aphaenogaster oligocenica
Asymphylomyrmex	Gen et sp nov	valid	Wheeler	Lutetian	Baltic amber	Russia	A dolichoderine ant.	Asymphylomyrmex balticus
Camponotus igneus	Sp nov	Jr synonym	Wheeler	Middle Eocene	Baltic amber	Europe	Fossil formicine ant. jr synonym of Camponotus mengei	Camponotus mengei
Dolichoderus mesosternalis	Sp nov	valid	Wheeler	Middle Eocene	Baltic amber	Europe	A Dolichoderine ant	Dolichoderus mesosternalis
Dolichoderus passalomma	Sp nov	valid	Wheeler	Middle Eocene	Baltic amber	Europe	A Dolichoderine ant	Dolichoderus passalomma
Drymomyrmex	Gen et 2 Sp nov	valid	Wheeler	Middle Eocene	Baltic amber	Europe	A formicine ant Type species D. fuscipennis	Drymomyrmex fuscipennis
Dolichoderus britannicus	Sp nov	Jr synonym	Cockerell	Late Eocene			A Dolichoderin ant jr synonym of Emplastus britannicus	Emplastus britannicus
Dolichoderus ovigerus	Sp nov	Jr synonym	Cockerell	Late Eocene			A Dolichoderin ant jr synonym of Emplastus britannicus	Emplastus britannicus
Erebomyrma antiqua	Comb nov	jr synonym	(Mayr, 1868)	Middle Eocene	Baltic amber	Europe	Fossil myrmicine ant, moved to Oligomyrmex antiqua in 1966; Synonym of Carebara antiqua	Carebara antiqua
Euponera (Trachymesopus) succinea	Comb nov	jr synonym	(Mayr)	Middle Eocene	Baltic Amber	Europe	A ponerine ant, new combination for Ponera succinea, moved to Pachycondyla succinea in 1995	Pachycondyla succinea
Formica constrictus	Comb nov	Jr synonym	(Mayr, 1868)	Middle Eocene	Baltic amber	Europe	Fossil formicine ant., moved to Cataglyphis constrictus in 1967; Synonym of Cataglyphoides constrictus	Cataglyphoides constrictus
Iridomyrmex constricta	Comb nov	Jr synonym	(Mayr)	Lutetian			A Dolichoderin ant jr synonym of Anonychomyrma constricta	Anonychomyrma constricta
Iridomyrmex geinitzi	Comb nov	Jr synonym	Mayr	Lutetian			Fossil Dolichoderine ant, jr synonym of Anonychomyrma geinitzi	Anonychomyrma geinitzi
Iridomyrmex goepperti	Comb nov	Jr synonym	(Mayr, 1868)	Middle Eocene	Baltic amber	Europe	Fossil Dolichoderine ant, moved to Liometopum goepperti in 1992, jr synonym of Ctenobethylus goepperti	Ctenobethylus goepperti
Iridomyrmex oblongiceps	Sp nov	Jr synonym	Wheeler	Lutetian	Baltic amber	Russia	Fossil Dolichoderine ant, moved to Ctenobethylus oblongiceps in 2009, jr synonym of Eldermyrmex oblongiceps	Eldermyrmex oblongiceps
Iridomyrmex samlandica	Sp nov	Jr synonym	Wheeler	Lutetian	Baltic amber	Europe	Fossil Dolichoderin ant, jr synonym of Anonychomyrma samlandica	Anonychomyrma samlandica
Paraneuretus	Gen et 2 sp	Valid	Wheeler	Lutetian	Baltic amber	Russia	An aneuretine ant	Paraneuretus tornquisti
Ponera hypolitha	Sp nov	Jr synonym	Cockerell	Late Eocene	Bembridge Marls		A Dolichoderin ant jr synonym of Emplastus hypolithus	Emplastus hypolithus
Sima klebsi	Sp nov	Jr synonym	Wheeler	Lutetian	Baltic amber	Europe	A pseudomyrmecine ant. Moved to Tetraponera klebsi in 1990	Tetraponera klebsi
Stenamma berendti	comb nov	valid	(Mayr, 1868)	Middle Eocene	Baltic amber	Europe	A myrmicin ant. Moved from Aphaenogaster berendti	Stenamma berendti
Stiphromyrmex	gen et comb nov	valid	(Mayr, 1868)	Middle Eocene	Baltic amber	Europe	A myrmicin ant. A new genus for Stigmomyrmex robustus	Stiphromyrmex robustus

== Archosauromorphs ==
=== Newly named pseudosuchians ===
Name	Authors	Location	Notes	Images	
Poposaurus	Mehl	Valid taxon	USA (Arizona, Texas, Utah and Wyoming),	A Dinosaur-like poposaurid suchian.	Poposaurus

=== Dinosaurs ===
- Charles H. Sternberg's crew excavated a Corythosaurus from quarry 243 in Dinosaur Provincial Park, Alberta, Canada. The specimen would later be displayed at the Calgary Zoo.
- Matthew observed that fossils of hadrosaur eggs and hatchlings were absent in coastal areas and suggested that hadrosaurs may have preferred nesting grounds further inland. He believed that these inland nesting grounds were actually where hadrosaurs first evolved and therefore to breed, hadrosaurs retraced their ancestors route back to their place of origin. After hatching, the young hadrosaurs would spend some time inland maturing before migrating out to more coastal areas.

==== New taxa ====
Taxon	Novelty	Status	Author(s)	Age	Unit	Location	Notes	Images
Kangnasaurus coetzeei	Gen. et sp. nov.	Valid	Haughton	Middle Cretaceous		South Africa	An iguanodontian	
Kentrosaurus aethiopicus	Gen. et sp. nov.	Valid	Hennig	Late Jurassic	Tendaguru Formation	Tanzania	An African stegosaurid	
Spinosaurus aegyptiacus	Gen. et sp. nov	Valid	Stromer	Cenomanian	Bahariya Formation	Egypt	A Sail-backed meat-eating Theropod.	

== Anapsids ==
=== Turtles ===
Name	Novelty	Status	Authors	Age	Unit	Location	Notes	Images
Cratochelone	gen et sp nov	valid	Longman	Albian	Toolebuc Formation	Australia	largest protostegid turtle from Australia	

== Synapsids ==
=== Non-mammalian ===
Name	Status	Authors	Age	Location	Notes	Images
Alopecognathus	Valid	Broom	263 Millions years ago.	South Africa		
Cerdodon	Valid	Broom	266 Millions years ago.	South Africa		
Galesuchus	Synonym of Eriphostoma.	Haughton				
Moschosaurus	Valid	Haughton				
Scylacorhinus	Valid	Broom	263 Millions years ago.	South Africa		
Simorhinella	Valid	Broom				
Struthiocephalus	Valid	Haughton	263 Millions years ago.	South Africa	Ostrich-Head ProtoMammal.	Struthiocephalus
Trochosaurus	Valid	Haughton	263 Millions years ago.	South Africa		
Tropidostoma	Valid	Broom	257 Millions years ago.	South Africa		

== Paleontologists ==
- Death of Eberhard Fraas.
