= Dolichoderus pinguis =

Dolichoderus pinguis Temporal range: Priabonian

Scientific classification
- Domain: Eukaryota
- Kingdom: Animalia
- Phylum: Arthropoda
- Class: Insecta
- Order: Hymenoptera
- Family: Formicidae
- Subfamily: Dolichoderinae
- Genus: Dolichoderus
- Species: †D. pinguis

Binomial name
- †Dolichoderus pinguis Dlussky, Rasnitsyn & Perfilieva, 2015

Species of ant

Dolichoderus pinguis is an extinct species of formicid in the ant subfamily Dolichoderinae known from a fossil found in Asia. The species is one of a number in the genus described from fossils.

== History and classification ==
Dolichoderus pinguis is known from a single ant found in Russia. The specimen was described from a compression fossil preserved in diatomite deposits of the Bol’shaya Svetlovodnaya site. Located in the Pozharsky District, on the Pacific Coast of Russia, the fossil bearing rocks preserve possibly Priabonian plants and animals which lived in a small lake near a volcano. The site has been attributed to either the Maksimovka or Salibez Formations and compared to the Bembridge Marls and Florissant Formation, both of which are Priabonian in age.

At the time of description, the holotype specimen, number PIN 3429/1134 was preserved in the A. A. Borissiak Paleontological Institute collections, part of the Russian Academy of Sciences. The fossil was first described by the trio of paleomyrmecologists Gennady Dlussky, Alexandr Rasnitsyn and Ksenia Perfilieva. In the type description, Dlussky, Rasnitsyn and Perfilieva named the species D. pinguis, with the specific epithet derived from the Latin "pinguis", which means fat.

Dolichoderus pinguis is one of over forty five species in Dolichoderus that have been described from fossils, and is the only one to have been described from a male, all others being described from females.

== Description ==
Dolichoderus pinguis was described from a lone 6.3 mm (0.25 in) long male preserved as a partial profile impression, missing portions of the legs, wings, and antennae. The head is shorter than it is long with rounded sides in the areas of the compound eyes. The eyes are big, being about half the length of the head. On the mesosoma, the scutum is larger than the scutellum which is only about half as long. The propodium bulges into a humped upper surface and the connecting area for the petiole is concave. A short neck connects the propodium to a node-like expanded petiole. While the D. pinguis male is the only fossil male described in the genus, the petiole does show similarity to Dolichoderus kutscheri described from Bitterfeld amber in Europe.
