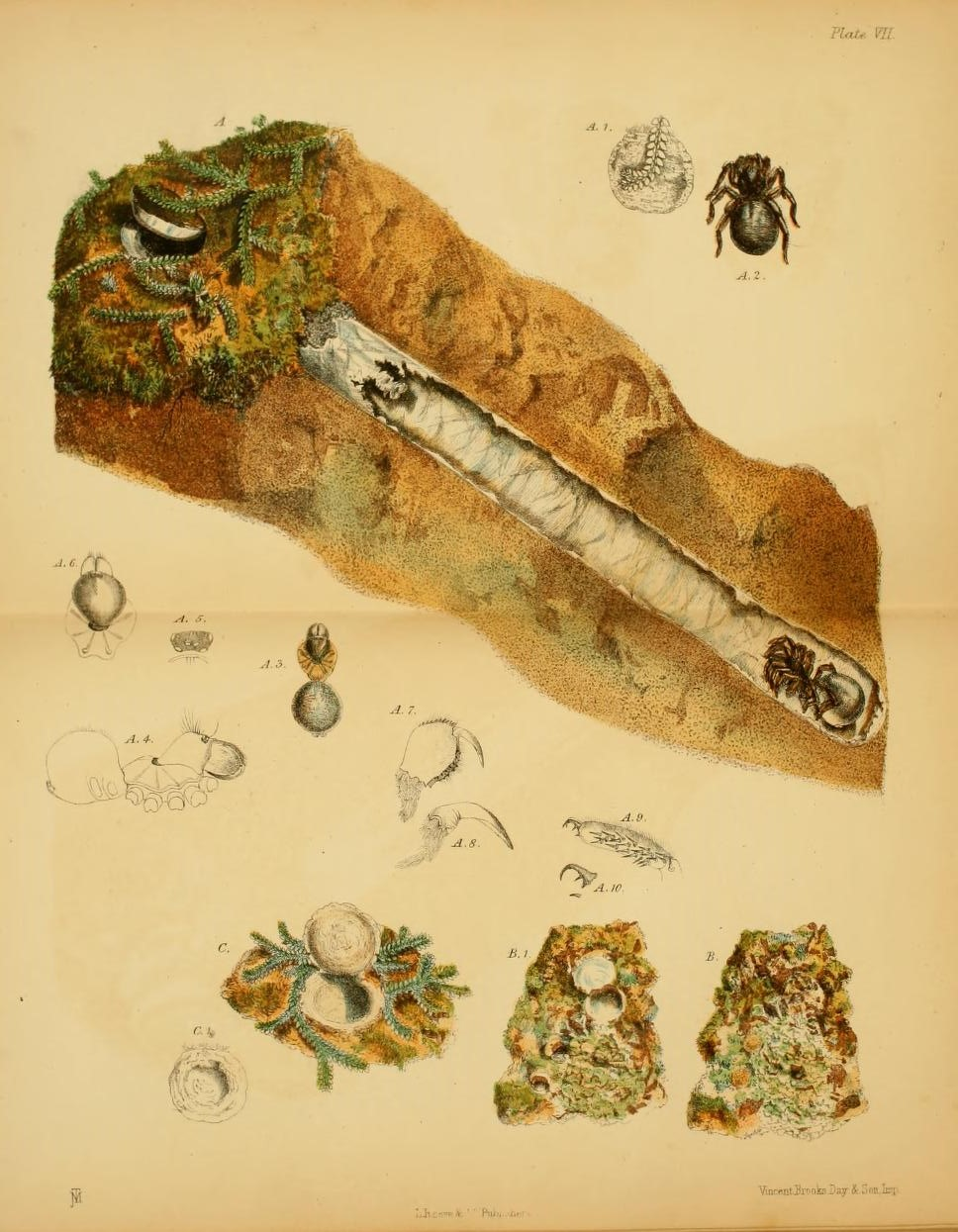

Scientific classification
- Kingdom: Animalia
- Phylum: Arthropoda
- Subphylum: Chelicerata
- Class: Arachnida
- Order: Araneae
- Infraorder: Mygalomorphae
- Family: Ctenizidae
- Genus: Cteniza
- Species: C. moggridgei

Binomial name
- Cteniza moggridgei O. Pickard-Cambridge, 1874

Synonyms
- Cteniza fodiens O. Pickard-Cambridge, 1873

= Cteniza moggridgei =

Species of spider

Cteniza moggridgei is a species of trapdoor spider found in France and Italy. On the Ionian Islands, their nests are often found among the roots of olive trees. These nests are sometimes found clustered together, but their proximity is not necessarily a sign of their sociality.

Its nests are rarely on flat ground, more often found on sloping to vertical banks so that gravity naturally pulls the door closed. The trapdoors have a cork-like lid that is not flush with the surrounding surface when shut, as is normal of this type of trap. Instead, it has short spur-like protrusions above and behind the hinge that serve as a lever to make raising and lowering the lid easier.
