= Baltocteniza =

Baltocteniza Temporal range: 37.2–33.9 Ma Early Eocene

Scientific classification
- Kingdom: Animalia
- Phylum: Arthropoda
- Subphylum: Chelicerata
- Class: Arachnida
- Order: Araneae
- Infraorder: Mygalomorphae
- Family: Ctenizidae
- Genus: †Baltocteniza; Eskov & Zonstein, 2000
- Species: †B. kulickae

Binomial name
- †Baltocteniza kulickae Eskov & Zonstein, 2000

Extinct genus of spiders

Baltocteniza is an extinct monotypic genus of spider in the family Ctenizidae. At present, it contains the single species Baltocteniza kulickae. The genus is solely known from the Early Eocene Baltic amber deposits in the Baltic Sea region of Europe.

== History and classification ==
Baltocteniza kulickae is known only from one fossil, the holotype, number "no. 12 845". It is a single subadult female individual preserved in a clear amber specimen. The amber specimen was identified as significant while the authors of the type description were examining specimens in the collections housed at the Museum of Earth, Polish Academy of Sciences in Warsaw, Poland. B. kulickae was first studied by Kirill Eskov and Sergei Zonstein, with their 2000 type description being published in the Russian Paleontological Journal. The generic name was coined by Eskov and Zonstein as a combination of "Baltic" and Cteniza, the modern trapdoor spider genus for which the family was named. This is in reference to the Baltic Sea where the type specimen was found and the genus that Baltocteniza is possibly related. The specific epithet "kulickae" was designated by K. Eskov and S. Zonstein in honour of the late Dr. Roza Kulicka, in whose care the specimen was found.

== Description ==
Baltocteniza kulickae is 3.38 millimetres (0.133 in) in length when the chelicerae are included in the measurement. Of that length the carapace is 1.13 millimetres (0.044 in) and the abdomen is 1.75 millimetres (0.069 in). The shape and general structure of the carapace indicates a close relationship to the modern genus Latouchia of Asia and the coeval Electrocteniza also known only from Baltic amber. The shape of the tubercle in Baltocteniza is unlike that found in most modern genera of Ctenizidaeforms the major difference between Baltocteniza, Electrocteniza and Latouchia. Electrocteniza's eye tubercle is more raised than Latouchia, while Baltocteniza has a much more curved anterior side of the tubercle than either of the other two genera.
