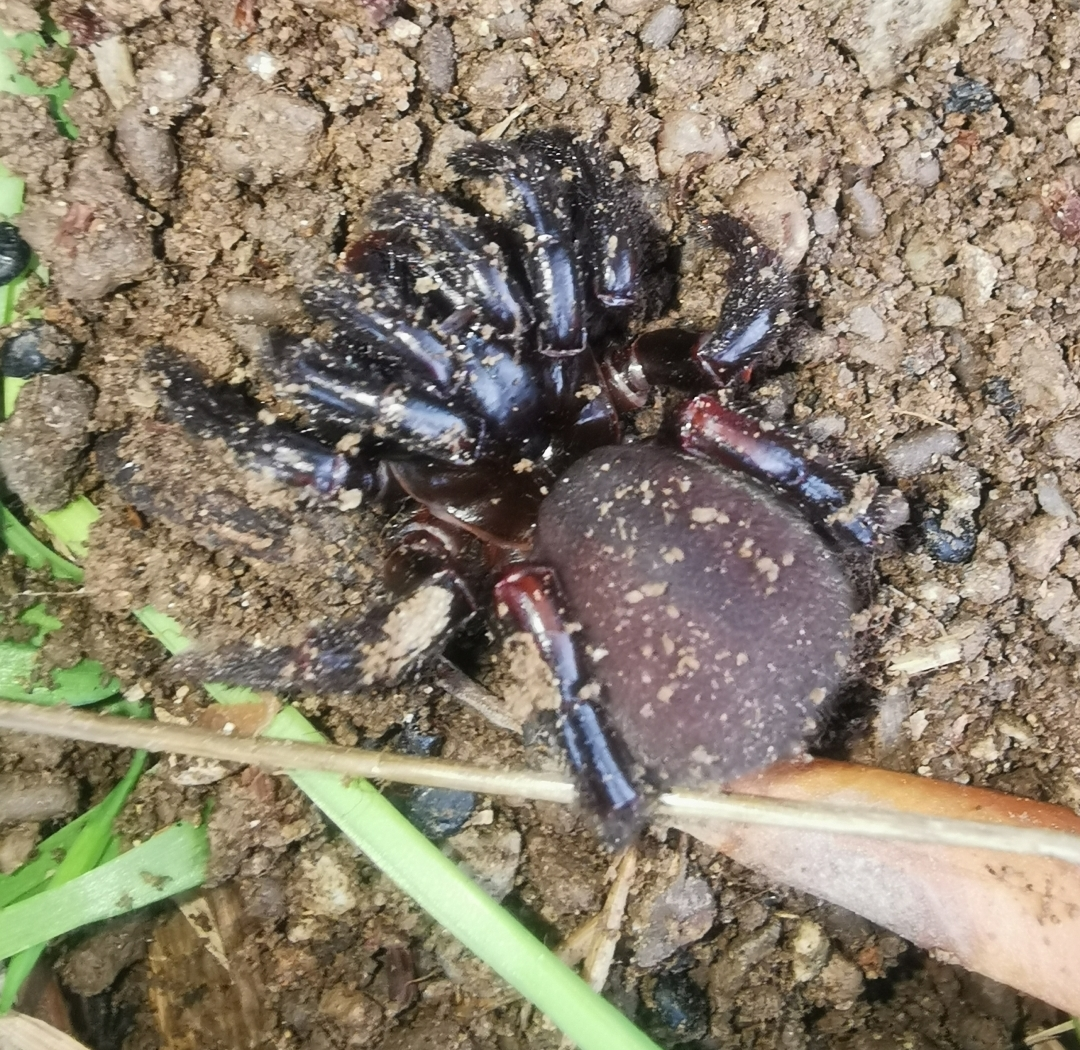
- female
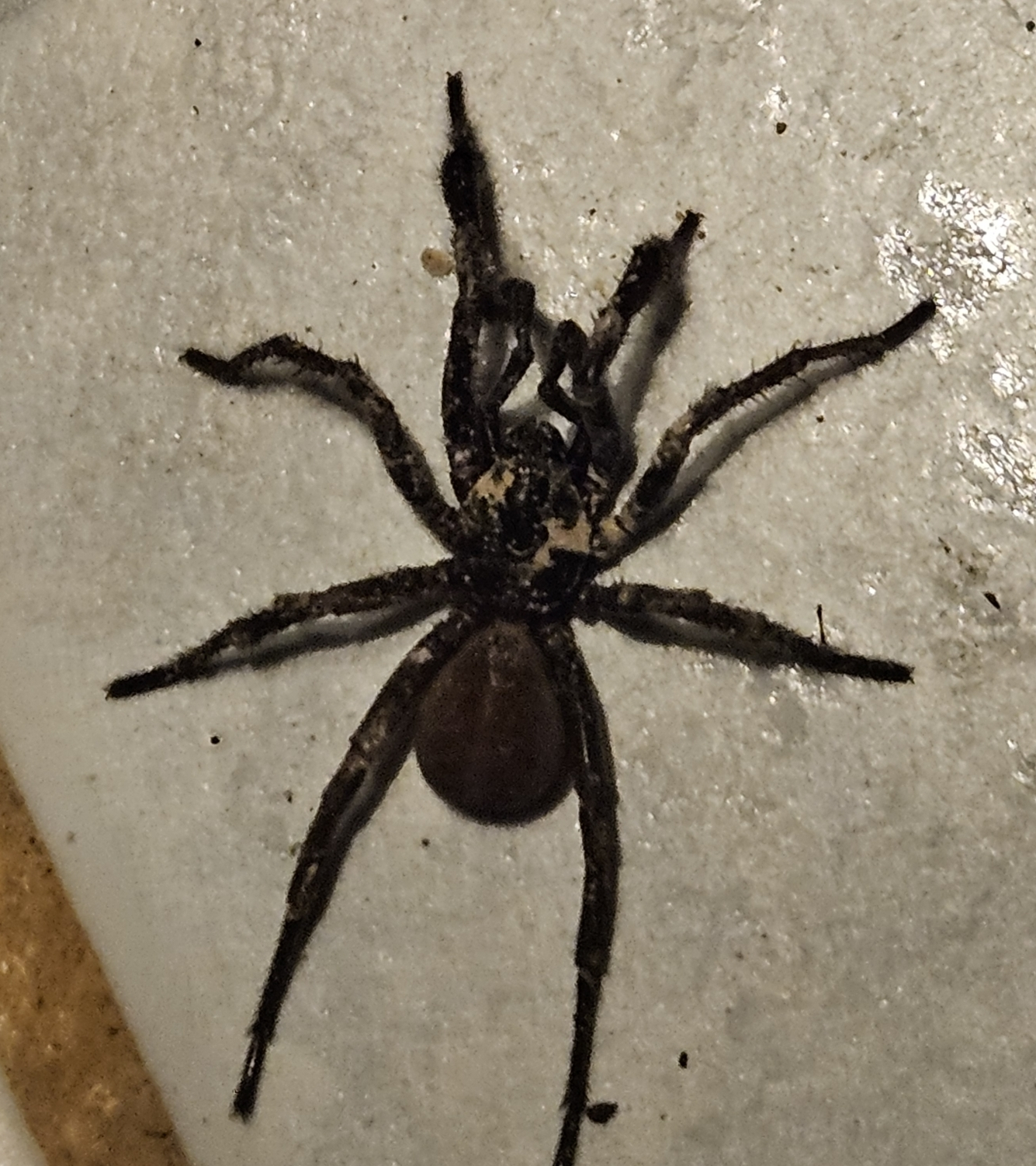
- male

Scientific classification
- Kingdom: Animalia
- Phylum: Arthropoda
- Subphylum: Chelicerata
- Class: Arachnida
- Order: Araneae
- Infraorder: Mygalomorphae
- Family: Ctenizidae
- Genus: Cyrtocarenum
- Species: C. grajum

Binomial name
- Cyrtocarenum grajum (C. L. Koch, 1836)

Synonyms
- Cteniza graja C. L. Koch, 1836; Mygalodonta graja Simon, 1864

= Cyrtocarenum grajum =

Species of spider

Cyrtocarenum grajum is a species of spider in the family Ctenizidae. It is endemic to Greece.
