= Dolichoderus kutscheri =

†Dolichoderus kutscheri Temporal range: Late Oligocene Bitterfeld amber

Scientific classification
- Domain: Eukaryota
- Kingdom: Animalia
- Phylum: Arthropoda
- Class: Insecta
- Order: Hymenoptera
- Family: Formicidae
- Subfamily: Dolichoderinae
- Genus: Dolichoderus
- Species: D. kutscheri

Binomial name
- Dolichoderus kutscheri Dlussky, 2008

Species of ant

Dolichoderus kutscheri is an extinct species of ant in the genus Dolichoderus. Described by Dlussky in 2008, the fossils of the species were found in the Bitterfeld amber, and is most likely to be from the Late Oligocene.
