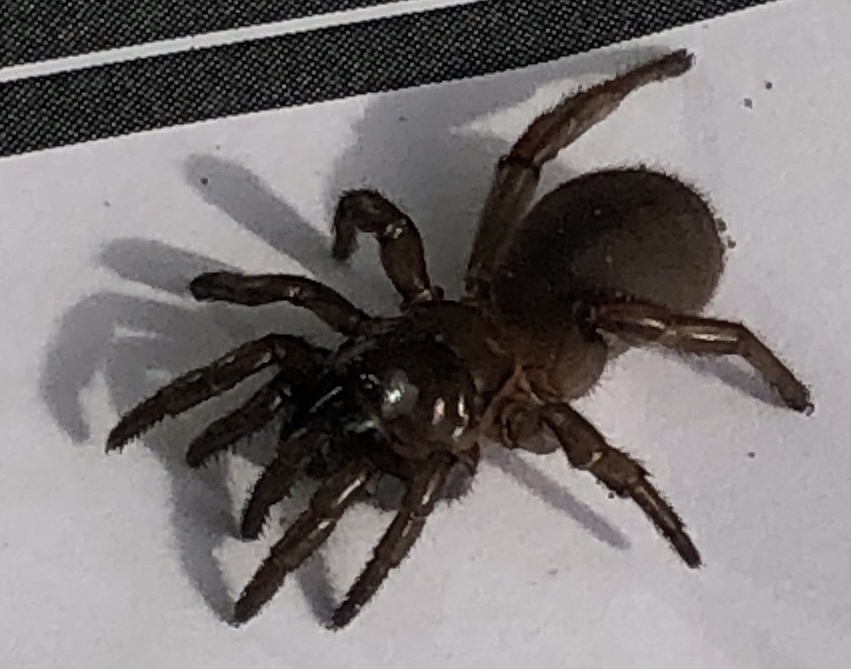
- C. cunicularium in Turkey

Scientific classification
- Kingdom: Animalia
- Phylum: Arthropoda
- Subphylum: Chelicerata
- Class: Arachnida
- Order: Araneae
- Infraorder: Mygalomorphae
- Family: Ctenizidae
- Genus: Cyrtocarenum
- Species: C. cunicularium

Binomial name
- Cyrtocarenum cunicularium (Olivier, 1811)

Synonyms
- Synonym list: Mygale cunicularia Olivier, 1811; Mygale ariana Walckenaer, 1837; Mygale ionica Saunders, 1842; Cyrtocephalus lapidarius Lucas, 1853; Mygalodonta ariana Simon, 1864; Cteniza tigrina L. Koch, 1867; Cyrtauchenius lapidarius Thorell, 1870; Cyrtauchenius corcyraeus Thorell, 1870; Cteniza orientalis Ausserer, 1871; Cyrtocarenum arianum Ausserer, 1871; Cyrtocarenum tigrinum Ausserer, 1871; Cyrtocarenum hellenum Ausserer, 1871; Cyrtocarenum lapidarium Ausserer, 1871; Cteniza ionica O. Pickard-Cambridge, in Moggridge, 1873; Cyrtocarenum ionicum Simon, 1880; Cyrtocarenum jonicum Simon, 1885; Cyrtocarenum werneri Kulczyński, 1903

= Cyrtocarenum cunicularium =

Species of spider

Cyrtocarenum cunicularium is a species of trapdoor spider in the family Ctenizidae, found in Greece (mainland, Crete and Rhodes) and Turkey.
