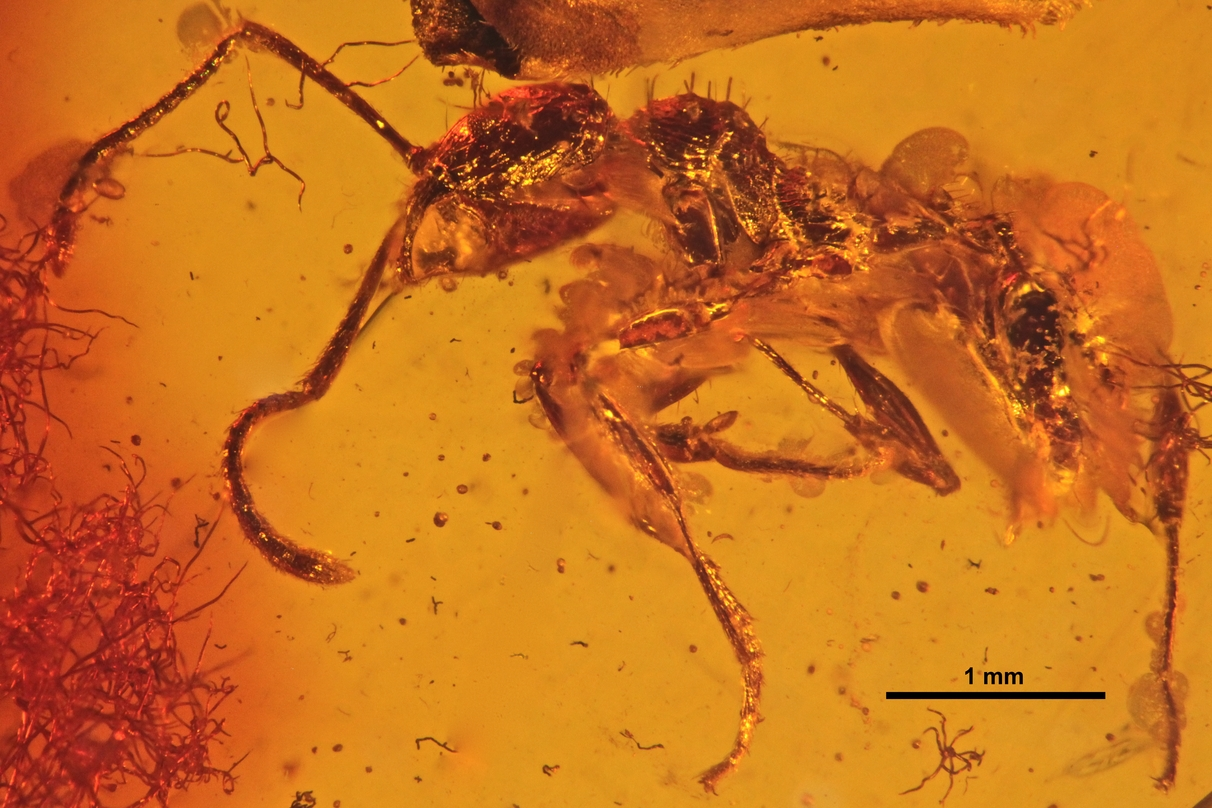
- A. sommerfeldti fossil in Baltic amber

Scientific classification
- Domain: Eukaryota
- Kingdom: Animalia
- Phylum: Arthropoda
- Class: Insecta
- Order: Hymenoptera
- Family: Formicidae
- Subfamily: Myrmicinae
- Genus: Aphaenogaster
- Species: A. sommerfeldti

Binomial name
- Aphaenogaster sommerfeldti (Mayr, 1868)

= Aphaenogaster sommerfeldti =

Aphaenogaster sommerfeldti Temporal range: Lutetian

Extinct species of ant

Aphaenogaster sommerfeldti is an extinct species of ant in the subfamily Myrmicinae known from a group of Middle Eocene fossils found in Europe. A. sommerfeldti is one of three species in the ant genus Aphaenogaster to have been noted from fossils found in Baltic amber by William Morton Wheeler.

== History and classification ==
When first examined, Aphaenogaster sommerfeldti was described from a pair of type specimen workers which are fossilized as inclusions in transparent chunks of Baltic amber. Baltic amber is approximately forty six million years old, having been deposited during Lutetian stage of the Middle Eocene. There is debate on what plant family the amber was produced by, with evidence supporting relatives of either an Agathis relative or a Pseudolarix relative. All the type specimens were collected over 125 years ago, and when first described were part of the University of Königsberg amber collection. The fossils were first studied by Austrian entomologist Gustav Mayr who placed the species in the genus Aphaenogaster. Mayr's 1868 type description of the new species was published in the Königsberg journal Beiträge zur Naturkunde Preussens.

William Morton Wheeler in his 1915 paper The ants of the Baltic amber noted that the University of Königsberg collections then contained a total of fourteen workers, plus one unnumbered specimen. An additional three were present in the private collection of Professor Richard Klebs, who first interested Wheeler on working with Baltic amber ant specimens. Alongside A. sommerfeldti, three other Aphaenogaster species are known from European amber fossil, A. antiqua, A. mersa, and A. oligocenica. While both A. oligocenica and A. sommerfeldti are known from Baltic and Bitterfeld amber, A. mersa has only been found in Baltic amber and A. antiqua from Rovno amber.

== Description ==
Overall Aphaenogaster sommerfeldti can be distinguished from the related Baltic amber species A. oligocenica in several ways. A. sommerfeldti individuals have an overall more sloped and curved mesonotum with the epinotum showing more tooth liked projections on the surface then seen in A. oligocenica. The other Baltic amber species, A. mersa, shows a more extensive amount of rugose structuring to the head, thorax, and body, with a reticulation in the structuring, while that of A. sommerfeldti is a longitudinal striate pattern. A. sommerfeldti shows a similar morphology to the living species A. subterranea from the warmer areas of southern Europe. The two species differ in the more upright spines on the epinotum of A. sommerfeldti. The head capsule of A. sommerfeldti is slimmer with thinner antenna segments and more complex rugosity on the rear of the capsule.
