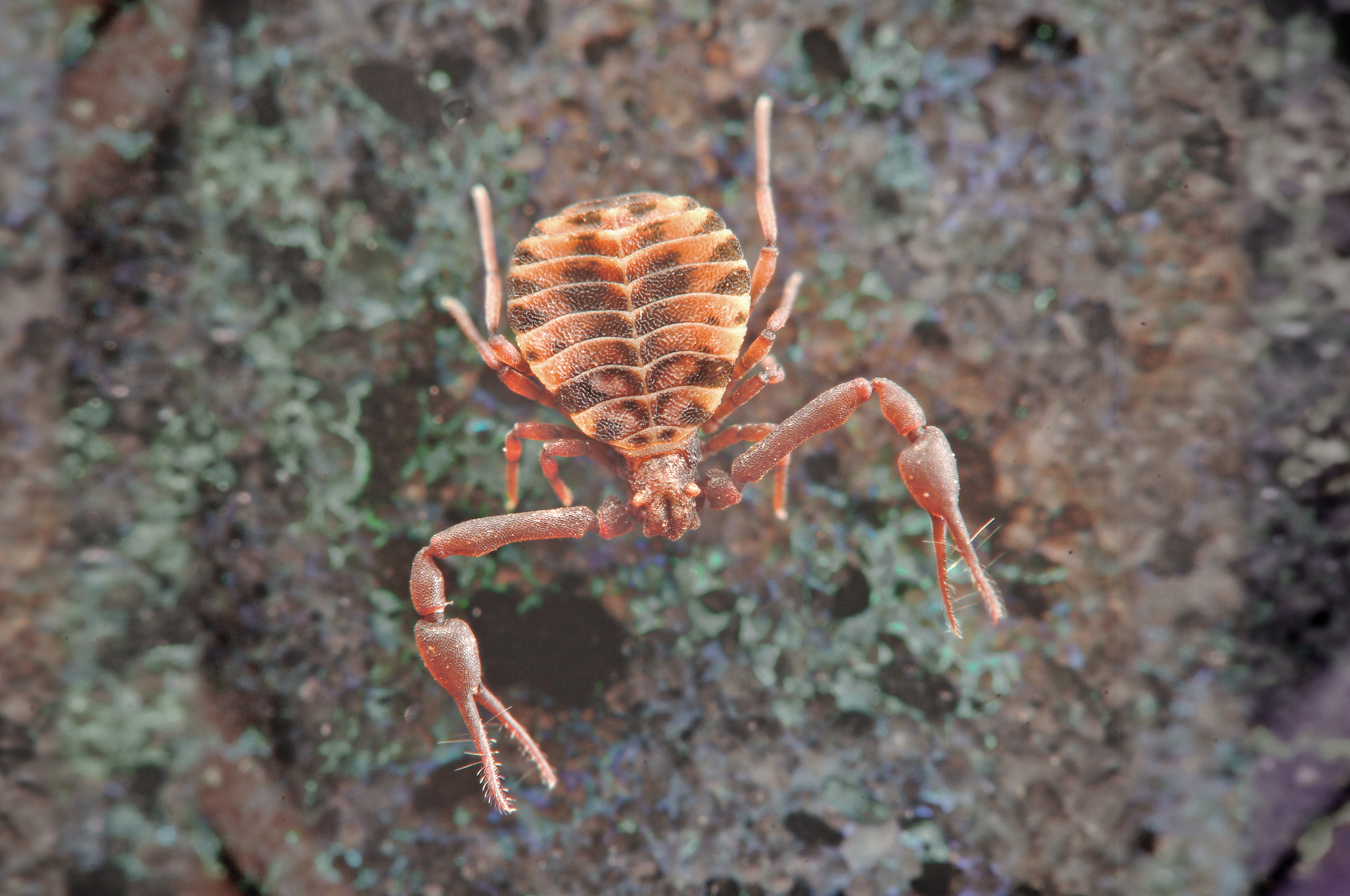
- Neopseudogarypus scutellatus

Scientific classification
- Kingdom: Animalia
- Phylum: Arthropoda
- Subphylum: Chelicerata
- Class: Arachnida
- Order: Pseudoscorpiones
- Family: Pseudogarypidae
- Genus: Neopseudogarypus; Morris, 1948

= Neopseudogarypus =

Genus of pseudoscorpions

Neopseudogarypus is a monotypic genus of pseudoscorpions in the family Pseudogarypidae. It was described in 1948 by J. C. H. Morris. It is endemic to Australia.

== Species ==
The sole species is Neopseudogarypus scutellatus Morris, 1948

=== Description ===
The body length of the holotype female is 2.59 mm; that of a male paratype is 2.415 mm. The colour is yellowish-brown.

=== Distribution and habitat ===
The species occurs in northern Tasmania. The type specimens were collected from the undersurfaces of stones on the hills between Glen Dhu and Trevallyn, near Launceston.

=== Behaviour ===
The pseudoscorpions are terrestrial predators.
