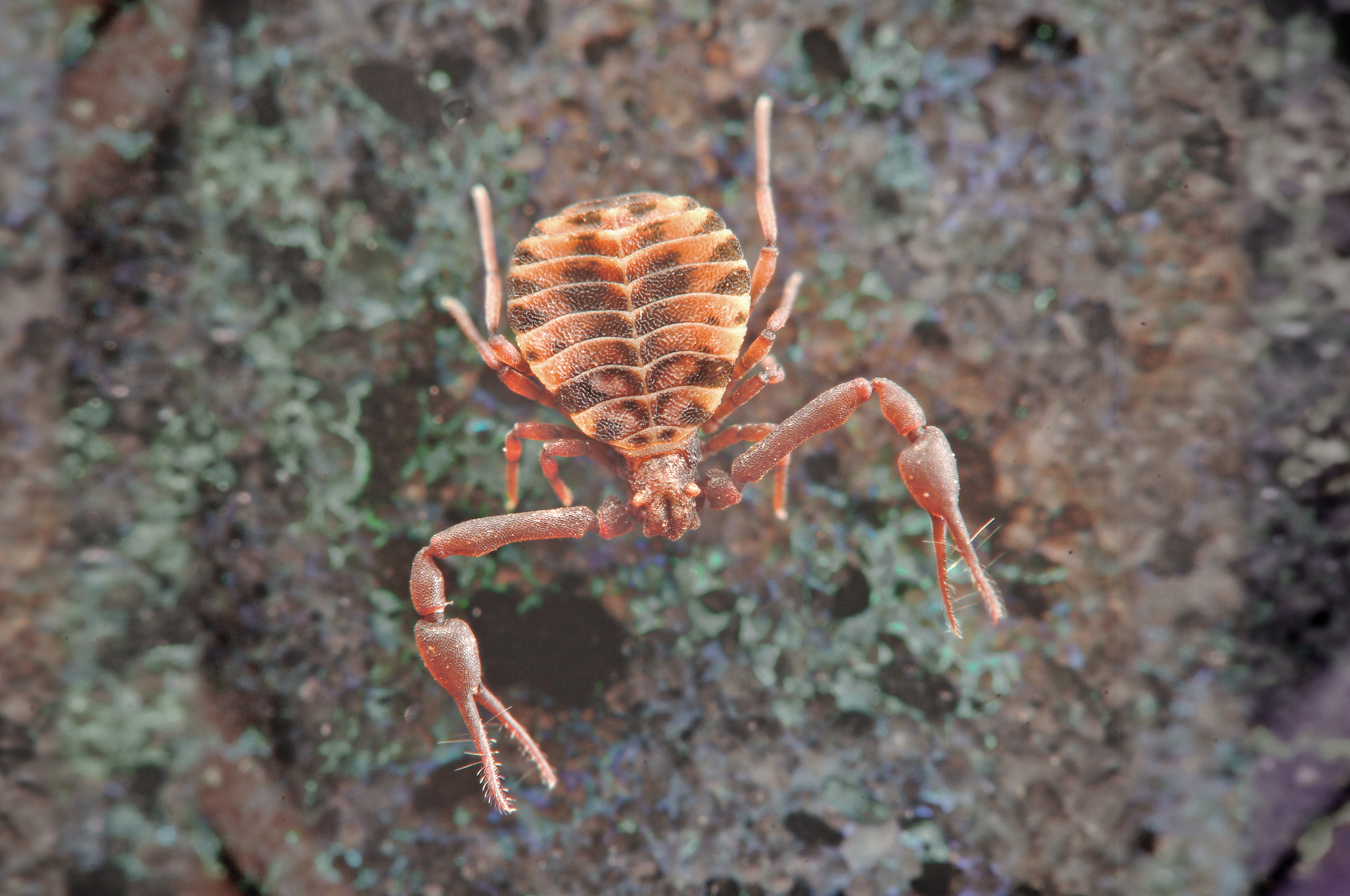
- Neopseudogarypus scutellatus

Scientific classification
- Kingdom: Animalia
- Phylum: Arthropoda
- Subphylum: Chelicerata
- Class: Arachnida
- Order: Pseudoscorpiones
- Superfamily: Feaelloidea
- Family: Pseudogarypidae; J.C. Chamberlin, 1923

Species
- See text

= Pseudogarypidae =

Pseudogarypidae Temporal range: Palaeogene–present

Family of pseudoscorpions

The Pseudogarypidae are a small family of pseudoscorpions. Most recent species are found in North America, while one species is endemic to Tasmania.

== Species ==
- Neopseudogarypus J.C.H. Morris, 1948

- Neopseudogarypus scutellatus J.C.H. Morris, 1948 — Tasmania

- Pseudogarypus Ellingsen, 1909

- Pseudogarypus banksi Jacot, 1938 — Quebec, northeastern United States
- Pseudogarypus bicornis (Banks, 1895)
- † Pseudogarypus extensus Beier, 1937 — fossil; Baltic amber
- † Pseudogarypus hemprichii (C. L. Koch & Berendt, 1854) — fossil; Baltic amber
- Pseudogarypus hesperus J.C. Chamberlin, 1931 — Oregon, Washington
- Pseudogarypus hypogeus Muchmore, 1981 — Arizona
- † Pseudogarypus minor Beier, 1947 — fossil; Baltic amber
- Pseudogarypus orpheus Muchmore, 1981 — California
- Pseudogarypus spelaeus Benedict & Malcolm, 1978 — California
- †Pseudogarypus synchrotron Henderickx, Tafforeau & Soriano, 2012 - fossil; Baltic amber
