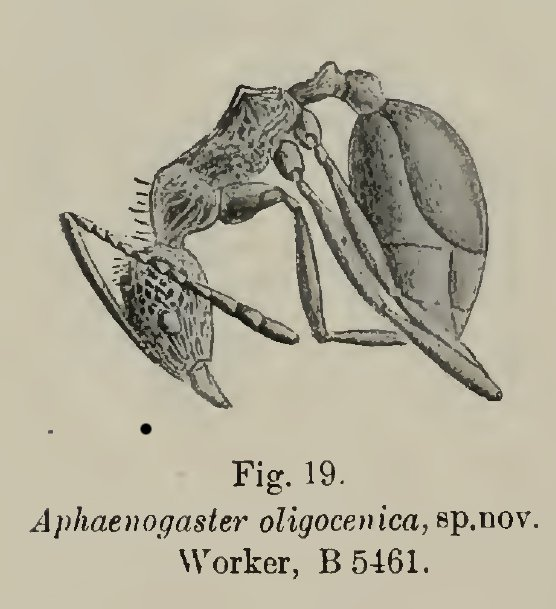
- A. oligocenica holotype illustration

Scientific classification
- Domain: Eukaryota
- Kingdom: Animalia
- Phylum: Arthropoda
- Class: Insecta
- Order: Hymenoptera
- Family: Formicidae
- Subfamily: Myrmicinae
- Genus: Aphaenogaster
- Species: A. oligocenica

Binomial name
- Aphaenogaster oligocenica Wheeler, 1915

= Aphaenogaster oligocenica =

Aphaenogaster oligocenica Temporal range: Lutetian

Extinct species of ant

Aphaenogaster oligocenica is an extinct species of ant in the subfamily Myrmicinae known from a pair of Middle Eocene fossils found in Europe. A. oligocenica is one of three species in the ant genus Aphaenogaster to have been noted from fossils found in Baltic amber by William Morton Wheeler.

== History and classification ==
When first examined, Aphaenogaster oligocenica was described from a single type specimen worker, with a second specimen being noted as probably belonging to the species, but too obscured by white mold growth in the fossil to be confirmed. Both of the specimen ants are fossilized as inclusions in transparent chunks of Baltic amber. Baltic amber is approximately 46 million years old, having been deposited during the Lutetian stage of the Middle Eocene. There is debate over the plant family which produced the amber, with evidence supporting relatives of either an Agathis or a Pseudolarix. When first described, the type worker was part of the University of Königsberg amber collection as specimen number B5461, and the possible second fossil was specimen number B18570. The fossils were first studied by Wheeler, then a paleoentomologist with Harvard University, who placed the species in the genus Aphaenogaster. Wheeler's 1915 type description of the new species was published in the journal Schriften der Physikalisch-Okonomischen Gesellschaft zu Konigsberg.

In his 1915 paper Wheeler noted that alongside A. oligocenica, two other Aphaenogaster species are known from European amber fossils A. mersa, and A. sommerfeldti. A third northern European amber species, A. antiqua, was described in 2009, and the authors of the 2009 paper noted a second confirmed A. oligocenica specimen which had been identified during their study. While both A. oligocenica and A. sommerfeldti are known from Baltic and Bitterfeld amber, A. mersa has only been found in Baltic amber and A. antiqua in Rovno amber.

== Description ==
The type worker of A. oligocenica has an approximate body length of 4.5 millimetres (0.18 in), with a large gaster and long legs. Overall A. oligocenica can be distinguished from the related Baltic amber species A. sommerfeldti in several ways. A. sommerfeldti individuals have a more sloped and curved mesonotum with the epinotum showing more tooth-like projections on the surface than seen in of A. oligocenica. The head capsule of A. oligocenica has rugose structuring which displays a reticulation on the rear of the capsule, transitioning to lengthwise striations from the region of the eyes forward. On the thorax and epinotum the striations are well pronounced and placed further apart than those on the head.
