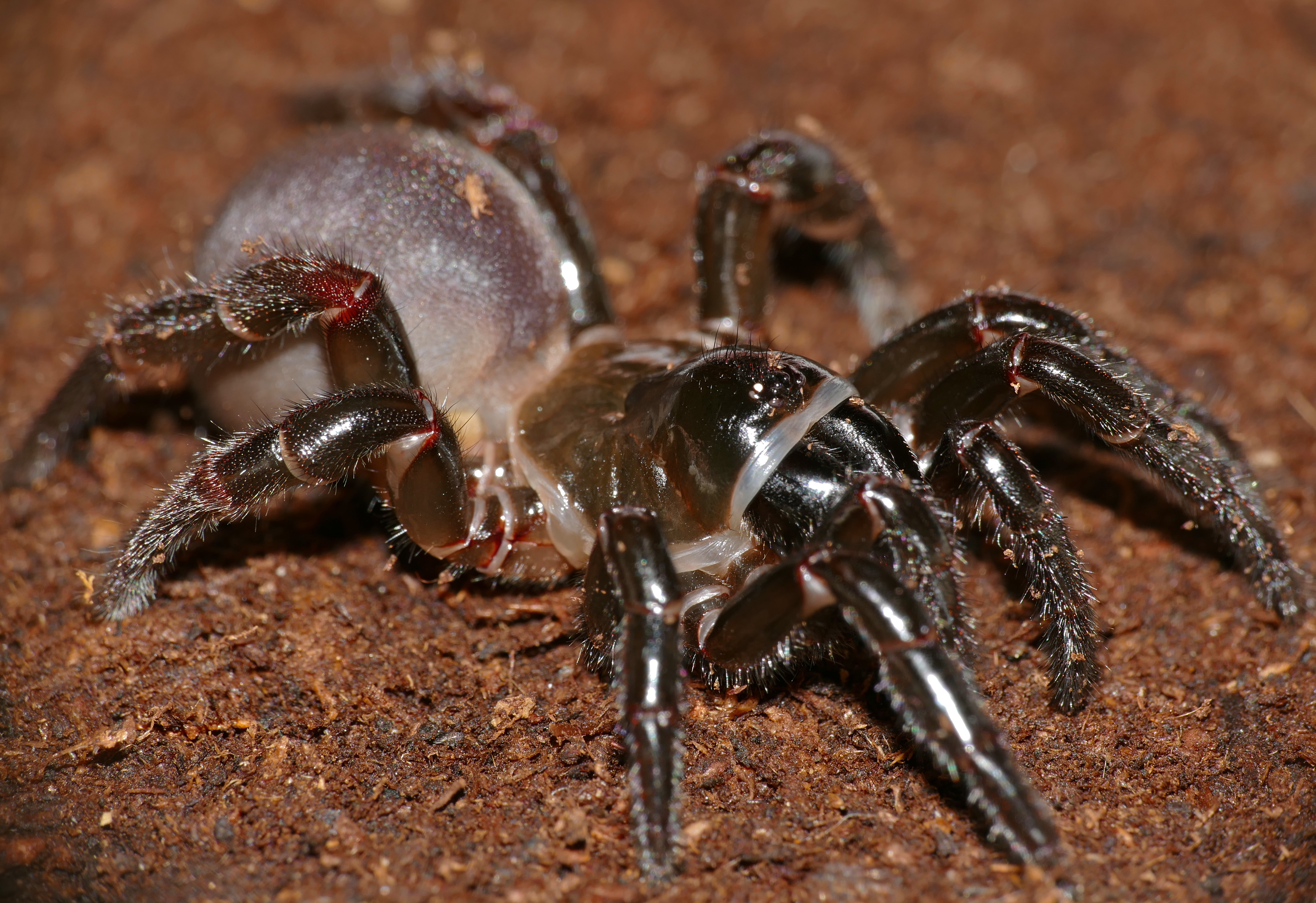

Scientific classification
- Kingdom: Animalia
- Phylum: Arthropoda
- Subphylum: Chelicerata
- Class: Arachnida
- Order: Araneae
- Infraorder: Mygalomorphae
- Family: Ctenizidae
- Genus: Cteniza
- Species: C. sauvagesi

Binomial name
- Cteniza sauvagesi (Rossi, 1788)

Synonyms
- Aepycephalus brevidens; Aranea sauvagii; Aranea sauvagesii; Mygale sauvagesi; Mygale fodiens; Nemesia fodiens; Cteniza brevidens (Doleschall, 1871)

= Cteniza sauvagesi =

Trapdoor spider from the Mediterranean region

Cteniza sauvagesi is a trapdoor spider first described in 1788 by Pietro Rossi. These spiders have only been found in the Mediterranean region, mainly on the large islands of Corsica and Sardinia on roadside banks and in the littoral zone. They are darkly colored with a shiny head and can reach 20 millimetres (0.79 in) in length.

Their trap-door burrows are lined with gossamer, more so than those of Nemesiidae. The trap's lid is cork-like and can be up to a centimeter in diameter. When the spider notices prey (probably by detecting vibration), it lunges out, to grab it before immediately retreating. The spider always stays inside its burrow with its hindlegs, in order not to lock itself out. The only time it leaves is to search for a mate. When the male finds a female's burrow, he will quaver on the lid with his legs until the female appears.

== Taxonomy ==
The species was first described by Rossi in 1788 as Aranea sauvagii. In 1799, Latreille changed Rossi's spelling of the specific name to sauvagesi, and this spelling has been used since.
