= Cerdodon =

Scientific classification
- Domain: Eukaryota
- Kingdom: Animalia
- Phylum: Chordata
- Clade: Synapsida
- Genus: †Cerdodon; Broom, 1915

Type species
- †Cerdodon tenuidens Broom, 1915

Extinct genus of therapsids

Cerdodon is an extinct genus of gorgonopsian therapsids. However, some consider this genus to be a nomen dubium. The holotype skull is of a crushed skull of a small therocephalian.

== See also ==
- List of therapsids
