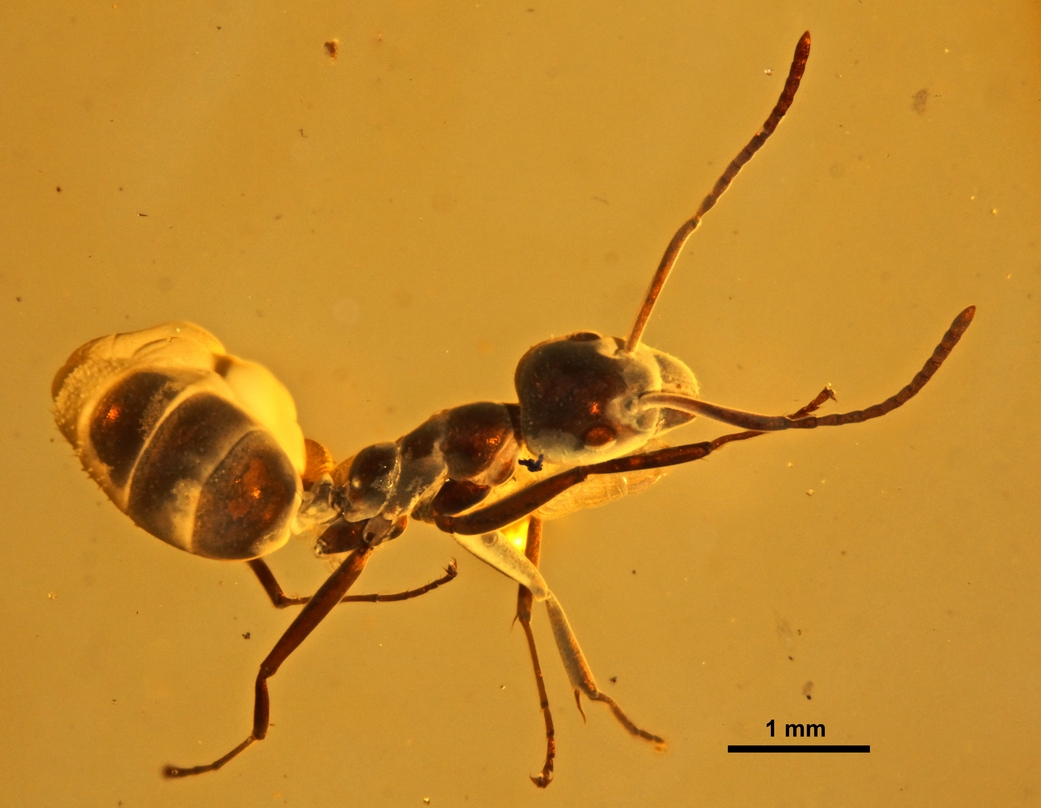
- Y. geinitzi worker

Scientific classification
- Kingdom: Animalia
- Phylum: Arthropoda
- Clade: Pancrustacea
- Class: Insecta
- Order: Hymenoptera
- Family: Formicidae
- Subfamily: Dolichoderinae
- Tribe: incertae sedis
- Genus: †Yantaromyrmex; Dlussky & Dubovikoff, 2013

Type species
- Yantaromyrmex geinitzi

Species
- Y. constrictus Mayr, 1868; Y. geinitzi Mayr, 1868; Y. intermedius Dlussky & Dubovikoff, 2013; Y. mayrianum Dlussky & Dubovikoff, 2013; Y. samlandicus Wheeler, 1915

= Yantaromyrmex =

Yantaromyrmex Temporal range: Middle Eocene – Late Oligocene

Genus of ants

Yantaromyrmex is an extinct genus of ants first described in 2013. Members of this genus are in the subfamily Dolichoderinae of the family Formicidae, known from Middle Eocene to Early Oligocene fossils found in Europe. The genus currently contains five described species, Y. constrictus, Y. geinitzi, Y. intermedius, Y. mayrianum and Y. samlandicus. The first specimens were collected in 1868 and studied by Austrian entomologist Gustav Mayr, who originally placed the fossils in other ant genera until the fossils were reviewed and subsequently placed into their own genus. These ants are small, measuring from 4 to 6 mm (0.16 to 0.24 in) in length and can be characterized by their trapezoidal shaped head-capsules and oval compound eyes that are located slightly to the rear of the capsules midpoint, with no known ocelli present.

== Distribution ==
Individuals of Yantaromyrmex species have been found as inclusions in four different Middle Eocene to Early Oligocene amber deposits in Europe. Baltic amber is approximately 46 million years old, having been deposited during the Lutetian stage of the Middle Eocene. There is debate on what plant family the amber was produced by, with evidence supporting them being relatives of either Agathis or Pseudolarix. Rovno amber, recovered from deposits in the Rivne region of Ukraine, is slightly younger in age, being dated to the Bartonian to Priabonian of the Late Eocene. Bitterfeld amber is recovered from coal deposits in the Saxony area of Germany and the dating of the deposits is uncertain. Bitterfeld represents a section of the Eocene Paratethys Sea, and the amber that is recovered from the region is thought to be redeposited from older sediments. The fossil record of Bitterfeld and Baltic amber insects is very similar with a number of shared species, and that similarity is noted in the suggestions of a single source for the paleoforest that produced the amber. The amber deposits on the Danish coast, often referred to as Scandinavian amber, is of similar age to the other three European ambers, however a study of the ant fauna published in 2009 indicates Scandinavian amber has a fairly distinct ant assemblage. Y. constricta and Y. geinitzi are both identified from all four European ambers, while Y. samlandicus has been described from Baltic, Bitterfeld and Rovno fossils. Y. intermedius and Y. mayrianum, are each known from only a few fossils, Y. intermedius from only a single Bitterfeld amber fossil while Y. mayrianum is known from a Baltic amber and a Rovno amber fossil.

== History and classification ==
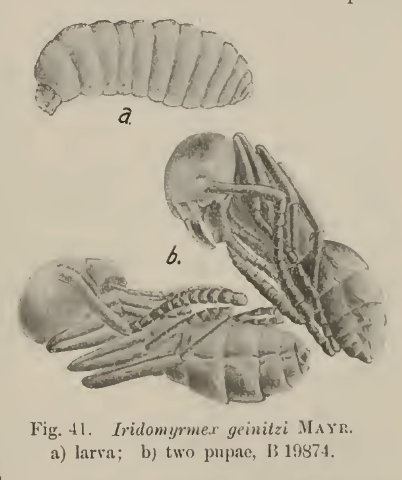
Larva and pupae of Y. geinitzi, illustrated by William Morton Wheeler

The type specimens of Y. geinitzi and Y. constrictus were collected in 1868, and when first described were part of the University of Königsberg's amber collection. The fossils were initially studied by Austrian entomologist Gustav Mayr who placed the two species in the genus Hypoclinea, now considered a junior synonym of the living genus Dolichoderus. Mayr's 1868 type descriptions of the new species were published in the journal Beiträge zur Naturkunde Preussens. All the Y. samlandicus syntypes were collected by 1915, and the first 73 described were part of the University of Königsberg amber collection. These fossils were first studied by American entomologist William Morton Wheeler, whose type description of "Iridomyrmex" samlandica was published in the journal Schriften der Physikalisch-Ökonomischen Gesellschaft zu Königsberg. Both Y. geinitzi and Y. constrictus were both moved from Hypoclinea to the small related genus Bothriomyrmex in 1873 by Dalla Torre. In his 1915 paper The ants of Baltic Amber Wheeler suggested both species and the newly named "I." samlandica would be better placed in the genus Iridomyrmex and noted Y. geinitzi to be one of the most abundant ant species in the Baltic amber he had studied.

Wheeler based the placement on the structuring of the labial and maxillary palpi. This placement was unchallenged until the genus was reviewed, redefined and split up in 1992 by Steven Shattuck. In his review, Iridomyrmex was split into a more restricted genus group while the other species which did not match the definition of that genus were moved to other genera. At that time Shattuck provisionally kept Y. geinitzi in Iridomyrmex citing a lack of specimens for him to study, while both Y. constrictus and Y. samlandicus were transferred to the genus Anonychomyrma. The placements of Y. geinitzi was retained until 2011 when Shattuck and Brian Heterick again reviewed Iridomyrmex. With more fossils to study and based on a number of characters, Y. geinitzi was also moved to Anonychomyrma. The three species were reviewed again, this time in 2013. The species were examined by Russian entomologists G.M. Dlussky and D.A. Dubovikoff, who they came to the conclusion that the three species, along with two unnamed species, were distinct from Anonychomyrma and Iridomyrmex. Based on the differences they noted, Dlussky and Dubovikoff erected the new genus Yantaromyrmex in 2013 for these ants and described two new species, Y. intermedius and Y. mayrinaum. The name is a combination of the Russian word янтарь, translated as yantar, meaning "amber" and the Greek μυρμήγκα which means "ant". They noted the new species name intermedius was derived from the Latin word of that same spelling, meaning "intermediate". They chose the name mayrianum to honor Gustav Mayr for his work as a myrmecologist.

== Description ==
The genus is characterized by workers which have head-capsules that are trapezoidal in shape, narrowing at the front and widening towards the rear of the capsule. The oval compound eyes are generally placed slightly to the rear of the capsules midpoint, and lacking ocelli completely. The mandibles have a number of teeth along the masticatory margin (the middle area of the mandibles) and an overall triangular shape. The gaster has a flat first tergite that does not cover the petiole, a flat fourth abdominal sternite.

=== Y. constrictus ===
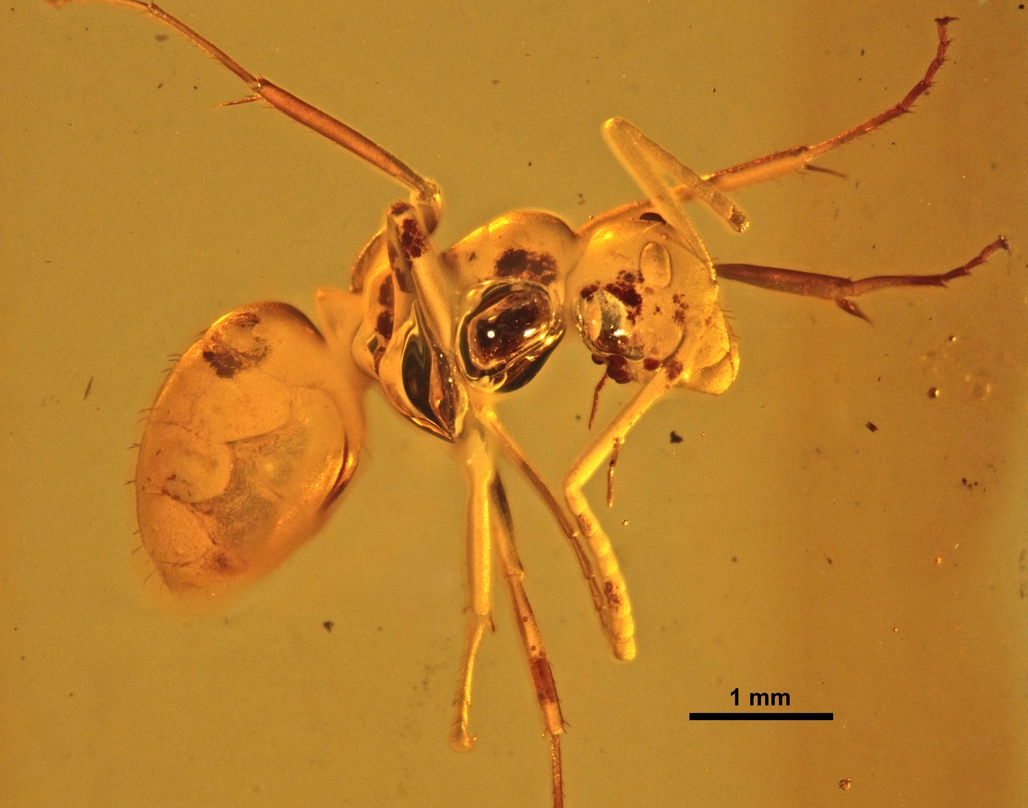
Y. constrictus worker

Overall Y. constrictus can be distinguished from the congeneric Y. geinitzi in several ways. Y. geinitzi individuals are overall more gracile in form with a less constricted mesonotum and the mesosoma has a less convex appearance. Y. constrictus specimens have maxillary palps (sensory organs) which are six-jointed, labial palps which are four jointed, and an abundantly hairy body. The antennae have a scape (the first segment of the antenna) which just passes the back-edge of the head capsule on both female and ergatomorphic (male) workers. The ergatomorphs have larger and more rounded compound eyes than the workers, and the antennae are overall longer than in the workers. Both males and workers have a five segmented gaster and the males are distinguished by the slightly protruding stipites (the second segment of the maxilla) at the tip of segment five.

=== Y. geinitzi ===
Overall Y. geinitzi can be distinguished from the related Baltic amber species Y. constricta in several ways. Y. geinitzi individuals are overall more gracile in form with a less constricted mesonotum and the mesosoma has a less convex appearance. Y. geinitzi specimens have maxillary palps which are six-jointed, labial palps which are four jointed, and the clypeal border is sinuately indented in the middle. The pupae which Wheeler referred to the species are noted to not have any cocoon unlike the modern larvae of some ant subfamilies which will spin a cocoon to pupate in. The eyes of Y. geinitzi are placed more to the front and sides of the head capsule than seen in Iridomyrmex species. Due to the shape of Y. geinitzi, the species may have been a herpetobiont (an inhabitant of the soil's surface), but scientists suggest that these ants inhabited trees, dwelling inside epiphytes and dead plant material (such as branches).

=== Y. intermedius ===
The only specimen of Y. intermedius is 4.5 millimetres (0.18 in) that has several cracks surrounding it, and areas of white "mold" coatings. The indent behind the propodeum (the first abdominal segment) is deep, the connection between the segment and the thorax is wide and covered in wrinkles of the exoskeleton. The propodeum has an angular appearance with a rounded corner when viewed from the side. This separates the species from both Y. geinitzi and Y. mayrianum. The legs of Y. intermedius are generally free of hairs while the mesosoma and head have only a few sparse hairs on the upper surface. This is different than the much hairier Y. constrictus which always has numerous erect hairs on the body and legs. The high conical propodeum and scape which does not extend to the edge of the head capsule isolate Y. intermedius from Y. samlandicus. The right antenna of the type specimen is preserved with the head of a Ctenobethylus goepperti worker ant clamped near the tip, and it seems the two had just fought prior to entombment.

=== Y. mayrianum ===
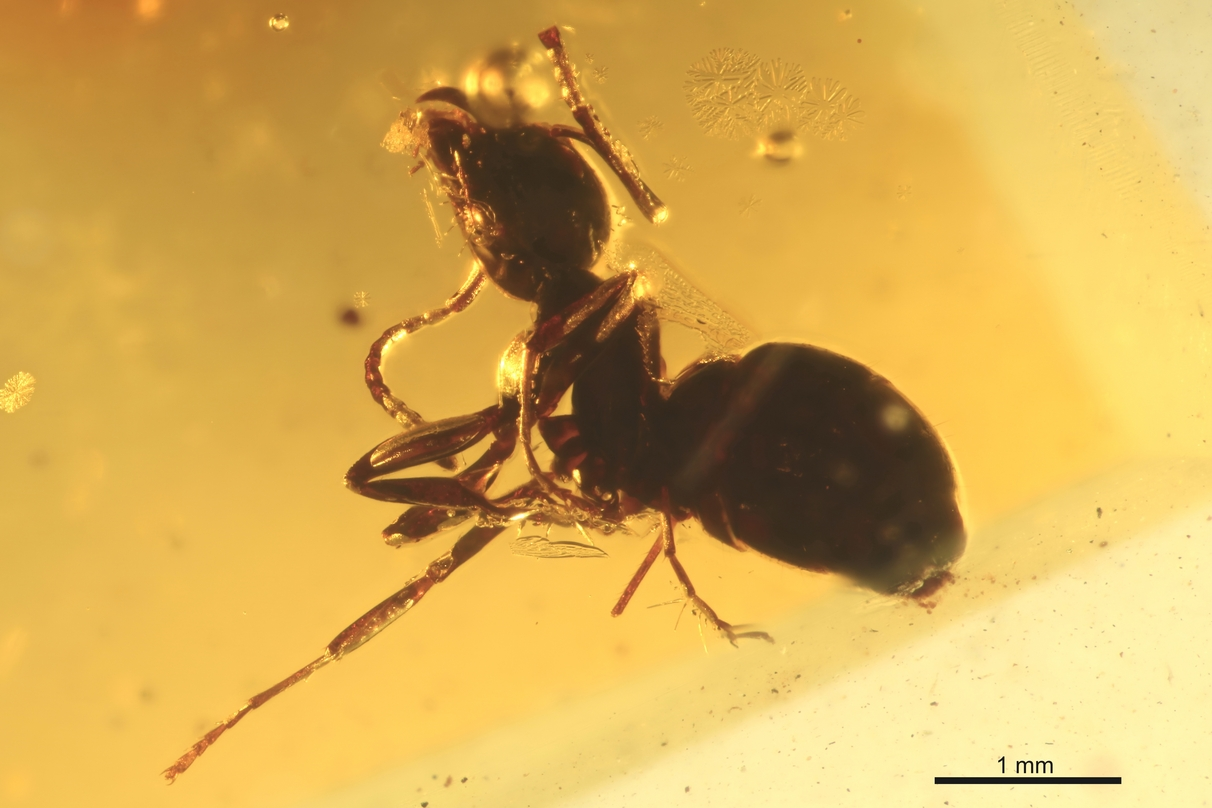
Y. samlandicus worker

Workers of Y. mayrianum range in length from approximately 4 to 5 mm (0.16 to 0.20 in) and look very similar to workers of Y. geinitzi. In both species the indent behind the first abdominal segment is broader and shallower than seen in Y. constrictus, Y. samlandicus and Y. intermedius. Also unlike the other three species the first abdominal segments surface is smooth and unsculptured. Y. mayrianum can be distinguished from Y. geinitzi by the amount of hairs found on the workers body. In Y. mayrianum there is abundant erect hair covering the entire body, on the underside head capsule and along the eye margins and leg undersides. In contrast Y. geinitzi workers have smooth eye margins and legs, and a sparse scattering of hairs on the mesosoma, last segments of the abdomen and along the upper side of the head.

=== Y. samlandicus ===
Y. samlandicus specimens have maxillary palps which are six jointed, labial palps which are four jointed, and a total body length between 5.5–6.0 millimetres (0.22–0.24 in). The antennae each possess twelve segments and a scape that curves at the base. The thorax is narrower in profile than the head capsule, reaching its widest in the broad flattened pronotum. The petiole is notably broad and short, having a high node that has a rounded point on the upper side. Y. samlandicus specimens have fine to coarse punctuation (small spots) across the head and thorax and an overall coloration that is black, though some specimens have a reddish tone to the legs or antennae.
