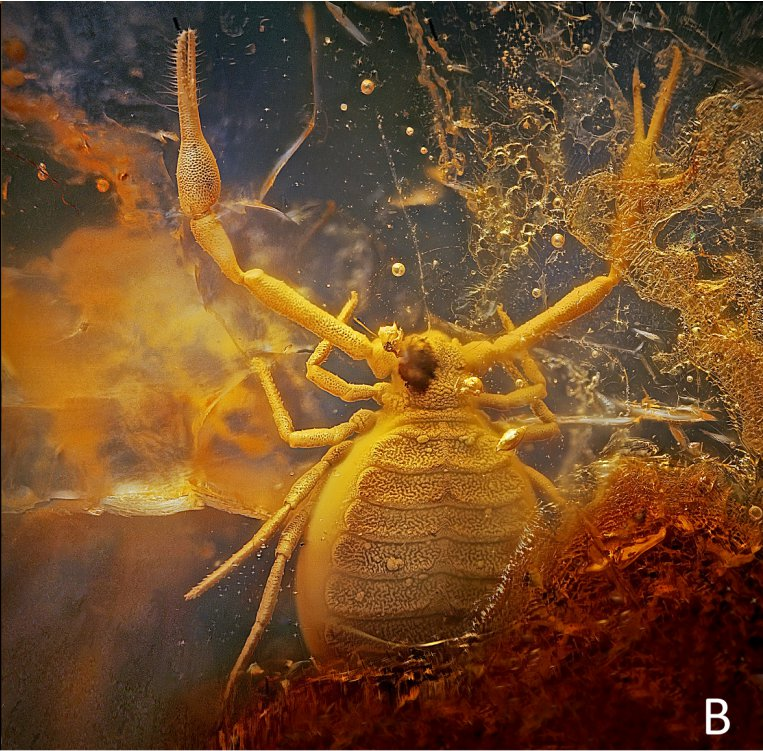
- specimen in Baltic amber

Scientific classification
- Domain: Eukaryota
- Kingdom: Animalia
- Phylum: Arthropoda
- Subphylum: Chelicerata
- Class: Arachnida
- Order: Pseudoscorpiones
- Family: Pseudogarypidae
- Genus: Pseudogarypus
- Species: †P. synchrotron

Binomial name
- †Pseudogarypus synchrotron Henderickx, 2012

= Pseudogarypus synchrotron =

Pseudogarypus synchrotron Temporal range: Priabonian.

Extinct species of pseudoscorpion

Pseudogarypus synchrotron is an extinct species of pseudoscorpion in the family Pseudogarypidae known from only two Eocene fossils found in Europe. P. synchrotron is one of four species in the genus Pseudogarypus to have been described from fossils.

== History and classification ==
Pseudogarypus synchrotron is known from two separate fossils, the holotype and paratype males, which are fossilized as inclusions in transparent chunks of Baltic amber. Both specimens were purchased from amber dealers, one in Lithuania and the other in the United States. As a result, the exact location from which the fossils were recovered is unknown. The holotype is a mostly complete adult that is positioned in the amber with its underside to the surface and its upper side turned inwards. The positioning leaves the upper side of the specimen hidden by distortions in the amber and another area on the underside is obscured by a large air bubble. The paratype male has a coating of whitish amber called "Baltic mould" across the surface of its underside and the amber encasing it showed a tendency to crack after polishing, possibly due to the evaporation of volatiles from the amber. The holotype is number 236 934 and currently housed in the fossil collection of the Royal Museum for Central Africa in Tervuren, Belgium while the paratype is in the personal collection of Hans Henderickx. Baltic amber is approximately forty six million years old, having been deposited during Lutetian stage of the Middle Eocene. There is debate on what plant family the amber was produced by, with evidence supporting relatives of either an Agathis relative or a Pseudolarix relative. To get a more detailed view, the holotype specimen was subjected to two series of imaging scans at the European Synchrotron Radiation Facility. The resulting stereolithographic models and 3-d digital reconstructions were then used for the detailed species description.

The type specimens were first studied by paleoarachnologist Hans Henderickx of the University of Antwerp with Paul Tafforeau and Carmen Soriano, both of the European Synchrotron Radiation Facility. Henderickx's 2011 type description of the new genus and species was published in the journal Palaeontologia Electronica. The specific epithet synchrotron is in reference to the synchrotron equipment that facilitated the description of areas of the specimen not visible to the naked eye.

== Description ==
Pseudogarypus synchrotron adults are mid-sized for Pseudogarypus, with a body length of approximately 2.5 millimetres (0.098 in), and show the distinctive body structuring that has horn-like protrusions, projecting ridges and a reticulate patterning to the carapace. This combination of features is found only in Pseudogarypus, making the genus placement easily recognizable. The chelae are distinctly elongated with a length to width ratio of 5:1; only those of Pseudogarypus extensus, also known from Baltic amber, are longer. The mobile finger of the chela has 24 teeth on its inner surface while the fixed finger has 33. The original coloration of the species is not identifiable due to the orange color-yellowish of the amber that encloses the specimens. The oval abdomen is longer than it is wide and has a generally teardrop shape. The thorax hosts two sets of horn-like protrusions, giving it an uneven outline with the larger "horns" placed to the rear.
