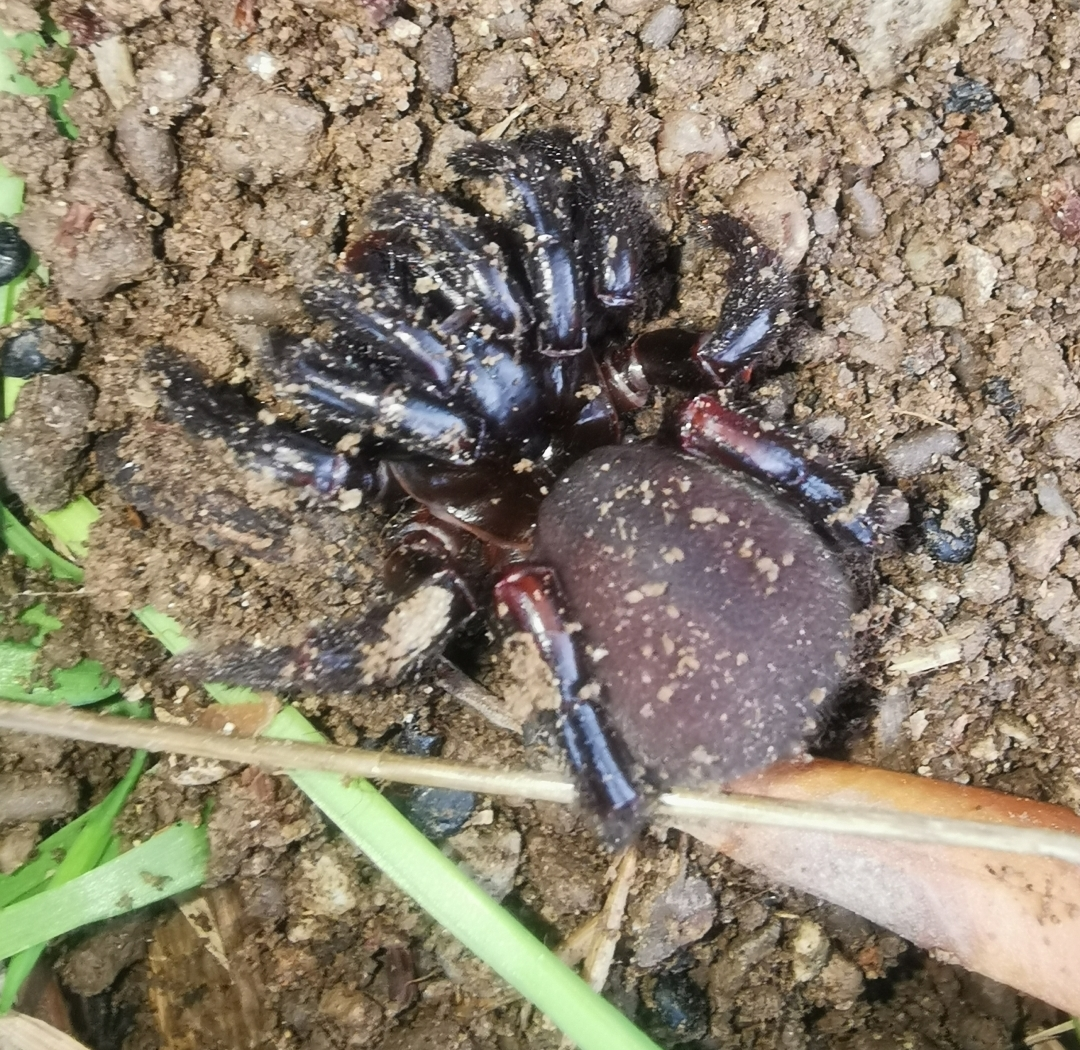
- C. grajum in Greece
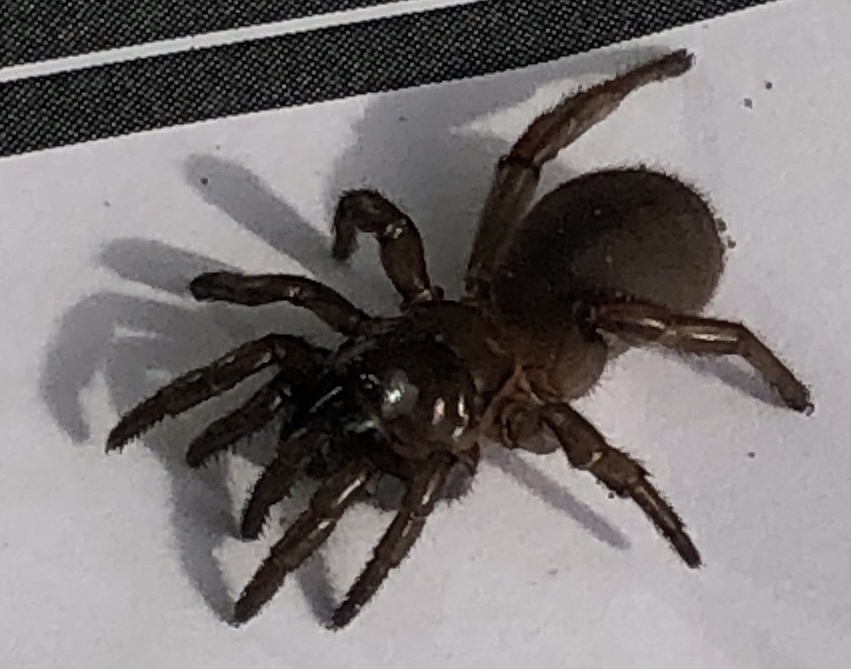
- C. cunicularium in Turkey

Scientific classification
- Kingdom: Animalia
- Phylum: Arthropoda
- Subphylum: Chelicerata
- Class: Arachnida
- Order: Araneae
- Infraorder: Mygalomorphae
- Family: Ctenizidae
- Genus: Cyrtocarenum; Ausserer, 1871

Type species
- C. cunicularium (Olivier, 1811)

Species
- 3, see text

= Cyrtocarenum =

Genus of spiders

Cyrtocarenum is a genus of Balkan trapdoor spiders first described by Anton Ausserer in 1871.

== Species ==
As of October 2025, this genus includes three species:

- Cyrtocarenum cunicularium (Olivier, 1811) – Greece (incl. Crete, Rhodes), Turkey (type species)
- Cyrtocarenum erlik Kunt & Yağmur, 2025 – Turkey
- Cyrtocarenum grajum (C. L. Koch, 1836) – Greece
