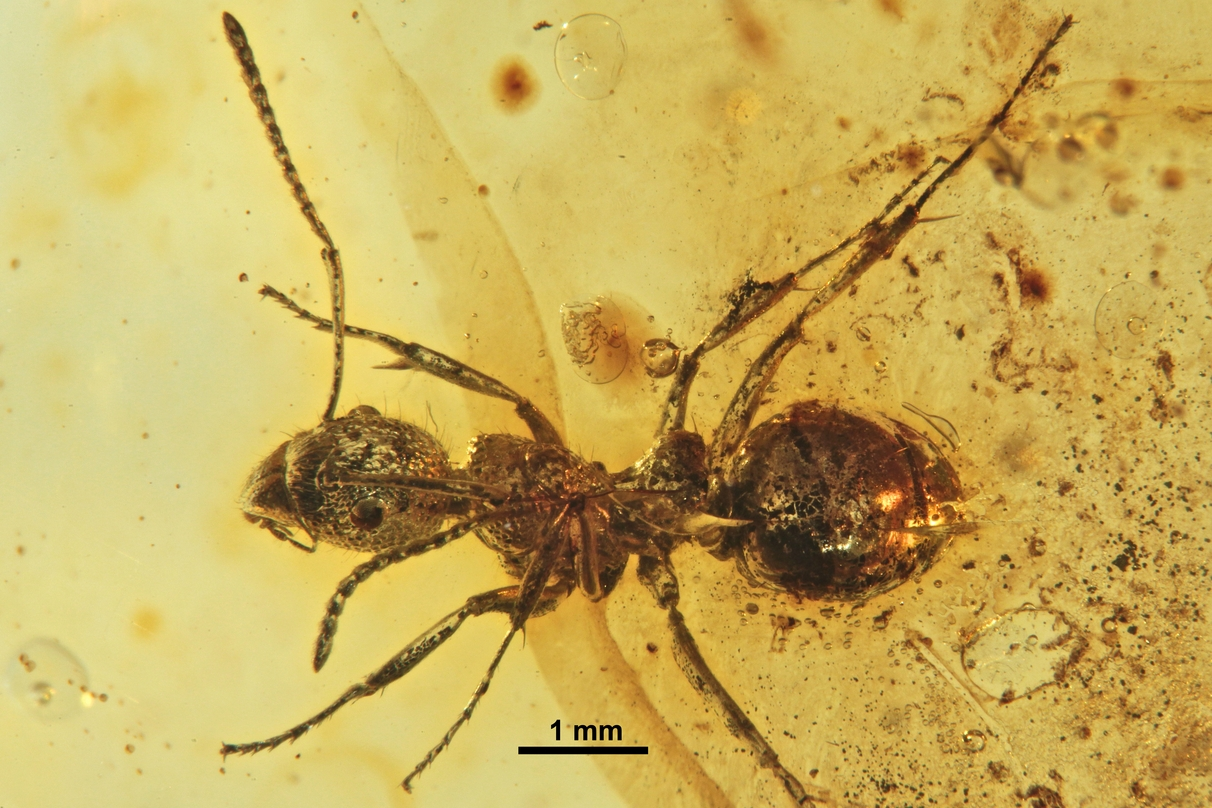
- Worker in Baltic amber

Scientific classification
- Domain: Eukaryota
- Kingdom: Animalia
- Phylum: Arthropoda
- Class: Insecta
- Order: Hymenoptera
- Family: Formicidae
- Subfamily: Dolichoderinae
- Genus: Dolichoderus
- Species: †D. mesosternalis

Binomial name
- †Dolichoderus mesosternalis Wheeler, 1915

= Dolichoderus mesosternalis =

Dolichoderus mesosternalis Temporal range: Middle to Late Eocene

Species of ant

Dolichoderus mesosternalis is an extinct species of Eocene ant in the genus Dolichoderus. Described by William Morton Wheeler in 1915, a fossilised worker of the species was found in the Baltic amber.
