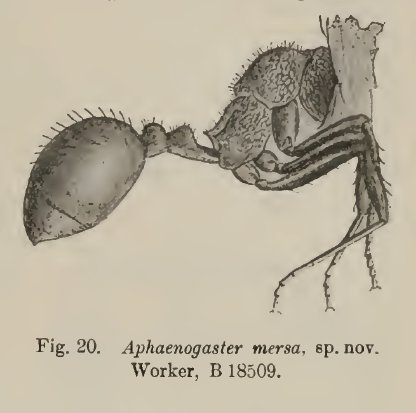
- A. mersa illustration

Scientific classification
- Domain: Eukaryota
- Kingdom: Animalia
- Phylum: Arthropoda
- Class: Insecta
- Order: Hymenoptera
- Family: Formicidae
- Subfamily: Myrmicinae
- Genus: Aphaenogaster
- Species: A. mersa

Binomial name
- Aphaenogaster mersa Wheeler, 1915

= Aphaenogaster mersa =

Aphaenogaster mersa Temporal range: Lutetian

Extinct species of ant

Aphaenogaster mersa is an extinct species of ant in the subfamily Myrmicinae known from a pair of Middle Eocene fossils found in Europe. A. mersa is one of three species in the ant genus Aphaenogaster to have been noted from fossils found in Baltic amber by William Morton Wheeler.

== History and classification ==
Aphaenogaster mersa was examined and described from a single type specimen worker which was fossilized as an inclusion in a transparent chunk of Baltic amber. Baltic amber is approximately 46 million years old, having been deposited during the Lutetian stage of the Middle Eocene. There is debate over the plant family which produced the amber, with evidence supporting relatives of either an Agathis or a Pseudolarix. When first described, the type worker was part of the University of Königsberg amber collection as specimen number B18509. The fossil was first studied by Wheeler, then a paleoentomologist with Harvard University, who placed the species in the genus Aphaenogaster. Wheeler's 1915 type description of the new species was published in the journal Schriften der Physikalisch-Okonomischen Gesellschaft zu Königsberg.

In his 1915 paper Wheeler noted that alongside A. mersa, two other Aphaenogaster species are known from European amber fossils A. oligocenica, and A. sommerfeldti. A third northern European amber species, A. antiqua, was described in 2009, and the authors of the 2009 paper noted a second confirmed A. mersa specimen which had been identified during their study. While both A. oligocenica and A. sommerfeldti are known from Baltic and Bitterfeld amber, A. mersa has only been found in Baltic amber and A. antiqua in Rovno amber.

== Description ==
The type worker of A. mersa has an approximate body length of 5.5 millimetres (0.22 in), though the fossil has a coating of white mold which obscures the entirety of the left side and a fracture in the amber which obscures the front portion of the head capsule. A. mersa is identifiable from A. sommerfeldti based on the front edge of the mesonotum, which is lower in A. mersa, and on the lower broader teeth present on the epinotum. The exoskeleton of A. mersa shows an overall reticulate patterning that is more rugose than A. sommerfeldti with only the frontal portion of the head capsule bearing possible longitudinal striations.
