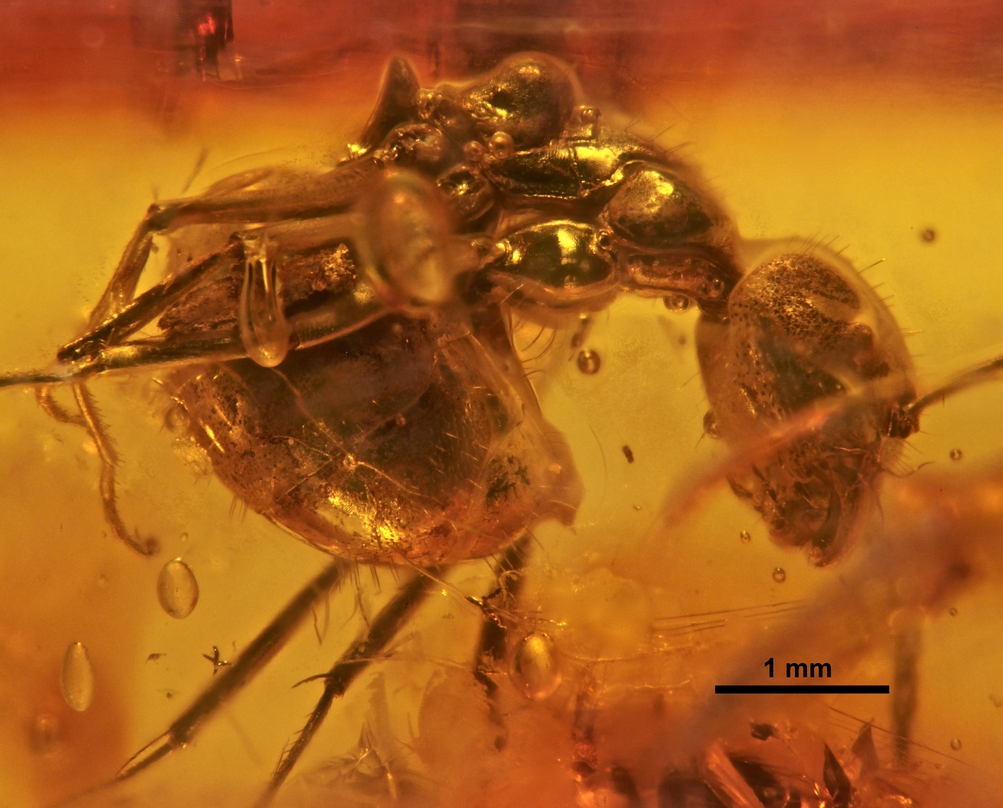
- Worker in Baltic amber

Scientific classification
- Kingdom: Animalia
- Phylum: Arthropoda
- Class: Insecta
- Order: Hymenoptera
- Family: Formicidae
- Subfamily: Dolichoderinae
- Genus: Dolichoderus
- Species: †D. passalomma

Binomial name
- †Dolichoderus passalomma Wheeler, 1915

= Dolichoderus passalomma =

Dolichoderus passalomma Temporal range: Middle to Late Eocene

Species of ant

Dolichoderus passalomma is an extinct species of Eocene ant in the genus Dolichoderus. Described by William Morton Wheeler in 1915, a fossilised worker of the extinct species was discovered in Baltic amber.
