= Electrocteniza =

Electrocteniza Temporal range: 37.2–33.9 Ma Early Eocene

Scientific classification
- Domain: Eukaryota
- Kingdom: Animalia
- Phylum: Arthropoda
- Subphylum: Chelicerata
- Class: Arachnida
- Order: Araneae
- Infraorder: Mygalomorphae
- Family: Ctenizidae
- Genus: †Electrocteniza; Eskov & Zonstein, 2000
- Species: †E. sadilenkoi

Binomial name
- †Electrocteniza sadilenkoi Eskov & Zonstein, 2000

Extinct genus of spiders

Electrocteniza is an extinct monotypic genus of spider in the family Ctenizidae. At present, it contains the single species Electrocteniza sadilenkoi. The genus is solely known from the Early Eocene Baltic amber deposits in the Baltic Sea region of Europe.

== History and classification ==
Electrocteniza sadilenkoi is known only from one fossil, the holotype, number "PIN, no. 363/88". It is a single male individual preserved in a clear amber specimen with several unidentified insects associated. The amber specimen was first identified as significant while residing in a private collection housed in Moscow, Russia. The specimen was then donated to the Paleontological Institute of the Russian Academy of Science in Moscow. E. sadilenkoi was first studied by Kirill Eskov and Sergei Zonstein, with their 2000 type description being published in the Russian Paleontological Journal. The generic name was coined by K. Eskov and S. Zonstein as a combination of the Ancient Greek word electron, meaning "amber", and Cteniza, the modern trapdoor spider genus for which the family was named. This is in reference preservation of the type specimen and the genus that Electrocteniza is possibly related. The specific epithet "sadilenkoi" was designated by K. Eskov and S. Zonstein in honor of the collector of the specimen, K. M. Sadilenko.

== Description ==
Electrocteniza sadilenkoi is 5.88 millimetres (0.231 in) in length when the chelicerae are included in the measurement. Of that length the carapace is 2.63 millimetres (0.104 in) and the abdomen is 2.50 millimetres (0.098 in). The shape and general structure of the carapace indicates a close relationship to the modern genera Latouchia from Asia and Sterrochrotus (a synonym of Cteniza) from South Africa. There are several differences between the genera. In general, Electrocteniza's eye tubercle is raised higher than Latouchia and Sterrochrotus. Unlike the modern genera of Ctenizidae, Electrocteniza has completely spineless tibiae, metatarsi and tarsi on legs I and II and chelicera which lack a rastellum.
