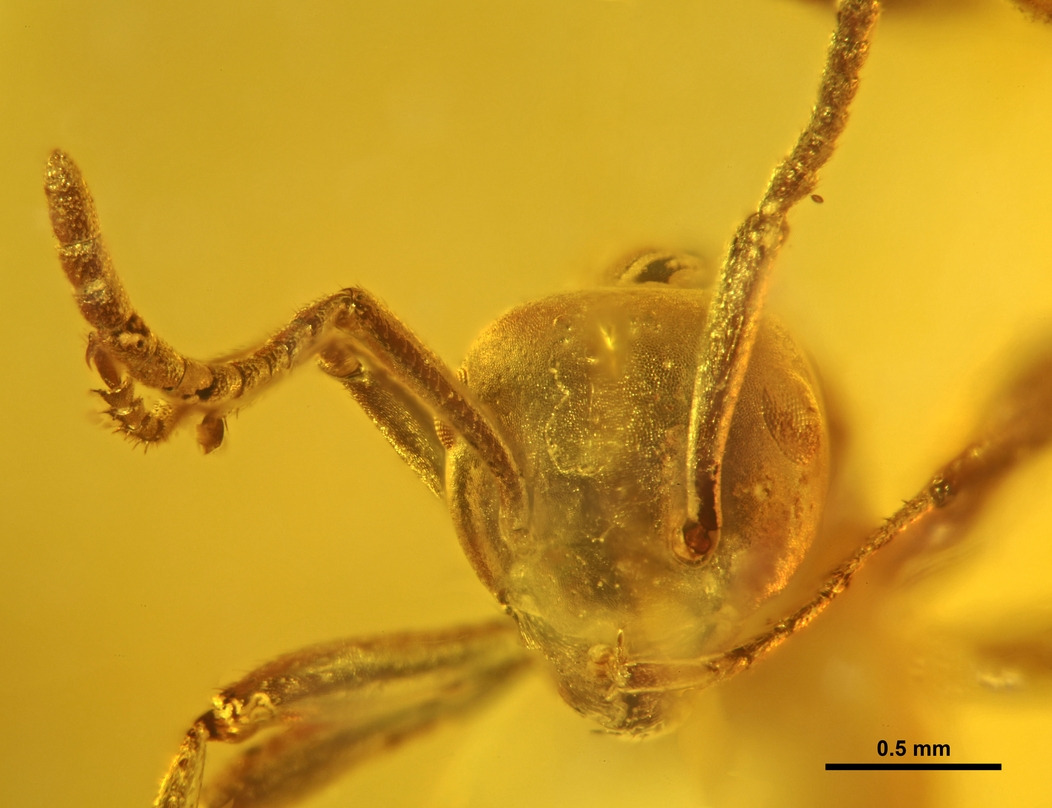
- Asymphylomyrmex balticus paratype close-up view

Scientific classification
- Domain: Eukaryota
- Kingdom: Animalia
- Phylum: Arthropoda
- Class: Insecta
- Order: Hymenoptera
- Family: Formicidae
- Subfamily: Formicinae
- Tribe: Formicini
- Genus: †Asymphylomyrmex; Wheeler, 1915
- Species: †A. balticus

Binomial name
- †Asymphylomyrmex balticus Wheeler, 1915

= Asymphylomyrmex =

Asymphylomyrmex Temporal range: Lutetian

Extinct genus of ants

Asymphylomyrmex is an extinct genus of ants in the formicid subfamily Formicinae. The genus contains a single described species, Asymphylomyrmex balticus and is known from a group of Middle Eocene fossils which were found in Europe.

== History and classification ==
When described by William Morton Wheeler, Asymphylomyrmex was known only from ten separate fossil ants, the holotype worker, number K4305, plus another nine workers which are fossilized as inclusions in transparent chunks of Baltic amber. Baltic amber is approximately forty-six million years old, having been deposited during the Lutetian stage of the Middle Eocene. There is debate as to what plant family the amber was produced by, with evidence supporting relatives of either Agathis or Pseudolarix genera trees. When first described, the type worker along with two other workers in a single amber piece, were in the private collection of Professor Richard Klebs of Königsberg University, who first interested Wheeler on working with Baltic amber ant specimens. The remaining seven workers were present in the University of Königsberg amber collection. All the specimens showed varying degrees of clouding in the amber or are in less than favorable positions for study.

The fossils were first studied by Wheeler, then a paleoentomologist with Harvard University, who placed the species in a new genus Asymphylomyrmex. Wheeler's 1915 type description of the new species and genus was published in the journal Schriften der Physikalisch-Okonomischen Gesellschaft zu Königsberg. Based on the structure of the head and thorax, and on the lack of spurs on the middle and hind tibia, Wheeler suggested that the species was a highly derived group which did not leave any descendants, having gone fully extinct. This group of characteristics led to erecting a new genus in Dolichoderinae rather than placing the species into an existing genus. A 2009 study on Central and Eastern European noted that at least one additional specimen of Asymphylomyrmex had been studied, from Rovno amber in Northern Ukraine.

== Description ==
It is estimated the workers would have been around 3.0 mm (0.12 in) long overall. A. balticus individuals have heads which are nearly orbicular, but slightly flattened on the rear portions. The eyes are large, slightly rounded in cross section, and placed along the sides. The ocelli are present but spaced far apart. The mandibles are slender, straight near the base then curving inwards towards the tips. The apex and central areas of the mandibles have large teeth present, while the basal area behind the central tooth is finely serrate. The mouth is surrounded by both maxillary and labial palpi. The maxillary palpi have four joints, while the labial palpi are only three-jointed. The antennae are composed of twelve segments, the terminal segments flaring slightly forming an indistinct club shape. The head and thorax have a fine punctate structuring to the exoskeleton, and are coloured an overall ferruginous red. The thorax shows a widening at the join between the pronotum and the mesonotum, then slopes towards the epinotum.
