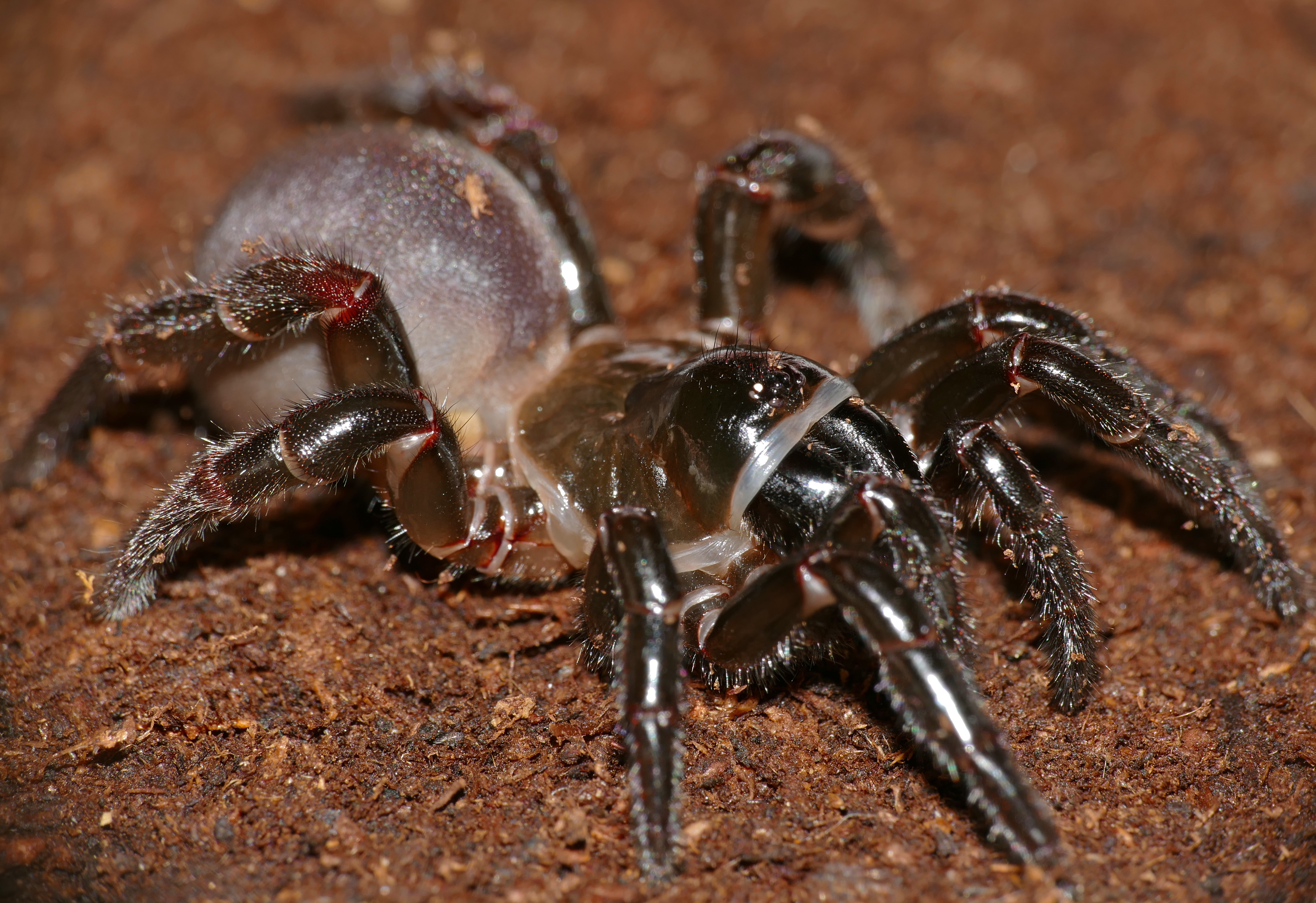
- Cteniza sauvagesi
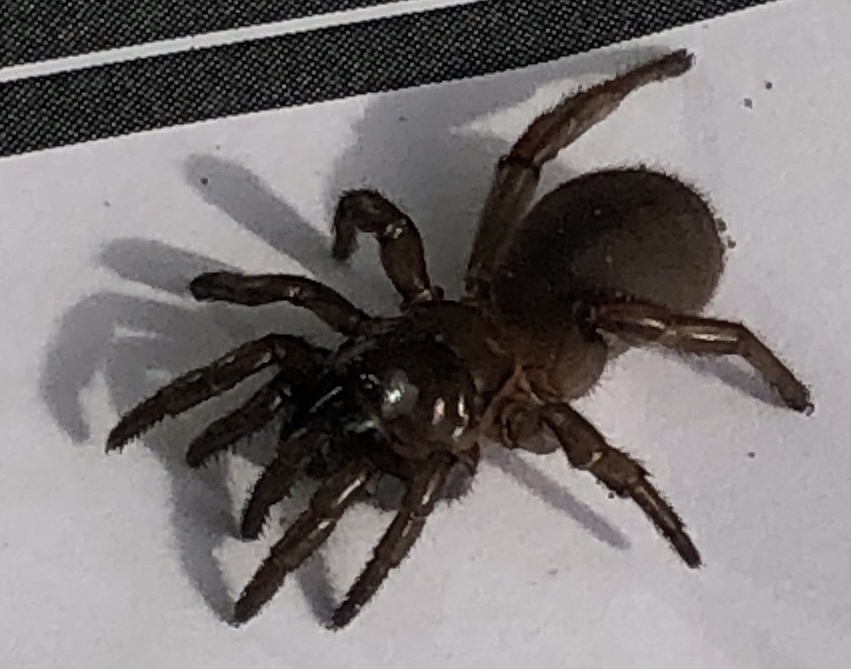
- Cyrtocarenum cunicularium in Turkey

Scientific classification
- Kingdom: Animalia
- Phylum: Arthropoda
- Subphylum: Chelicerata
- Class: Arachnida
- Order: Araneae
- Infraorder: Mygalomorphae
- Clade: Avicularioidea
- Family: Ctenizidae; Thorell, 1887

Diversity
- 2 genera, 5 species
- blue: reported countries (WSC)

= Ctenizidae =

Ctenizidae Temporal range: Palaeogene–present

Family of spiders

Ctenizidae (/ˈtənɪzədiː/ tə-NIZZ-ə-dee) is a small family of mygalomorph spiders that construct burrows with a cork-like trapdoor made of soil, vegetation, and silk. They may be called trapdoor spiders, as are other, similar species, such as those of the families Liphistiidae, Barychelidae, and Cyrtaucheniidae, and some species in the Idiopidae and Nemesiidae. The name comes from the distinctive behavior of the spiders to construct trapdoors, and ambush prey from beneath them.

In 2018, the family Halonoproctidae was split off from the Ctenizidae. A further genus, Stasimopus, was split off into its own family, Stasimopidae, in 2020. The family currently consists of two genera and five species.

== Etymology ==
The name derives from Greek κτενὶζειν ktenizein, meaning "combing" or "cleaning", referring to their behaviour of cleaning continuously, and the suffix "-idae", which designates belonging to a family.

== Taxonomy ==
The family Ctenizidae was first described by Thorell in 1887, being based on the genus Cteniza. Since the advent of molecular phylogenetics and its application to spiders, the family has been progressively dismantled; the World Spider Catalog lists over 100 genera formerly placed in Ctenizidae but now transferred to other families. The Halonoproctidae were split off in 2018, leaving only three genera. Even so, the family was not monophyletic, since Stasimopus is not in the same clade as the other two genera, according to a 2018 study (the three genera left in the Ctenizidae at that time are shaded in yellow):

- - Stasimopus
  - - - Heteromigas (Migidae)
      - - Idiops (Idiopidae)
        - - Myrmekiaphila (Euctenizidae)
          - - Cteniza
            - Cyrtocarenum
    - Halonoproctidae

In 2020, a large scale molecular phylogenetic study confirmed the placement of Stasimopus outside the clade consisting of Cteniza and Cyrtocarenum, and transferred it to its own family, Stasimopidae. This placement is accepted by the World Spider Catalog as of February 2022.

== Genera ==
As of October 2025, this family includes two genera:

- Cteniza Latreille, 1829 – Italy, France
- Cyrtocarenum Ausserer, 1871 – Turkey, Greece

Extinct genera

- †Baltocteniza Eskov & Zonstein, 2000 Early Eocene Baltic amber
- †Electrocteniza Eskov & Zonstein, 2000 Early Eocene Baltic amber

== Distribution and habitat ==
The two genera of Ctenizidae are found in Europe and Turkey, particularly in France and Italy. Like many other mygalomorphs, Cteniza have highly localized distributions. This results in clumps of spider burrows a short distance from their maternal burrows, resulting in a dense cluster of spiders surrounding a large female.

== See also ==
- Spider families
