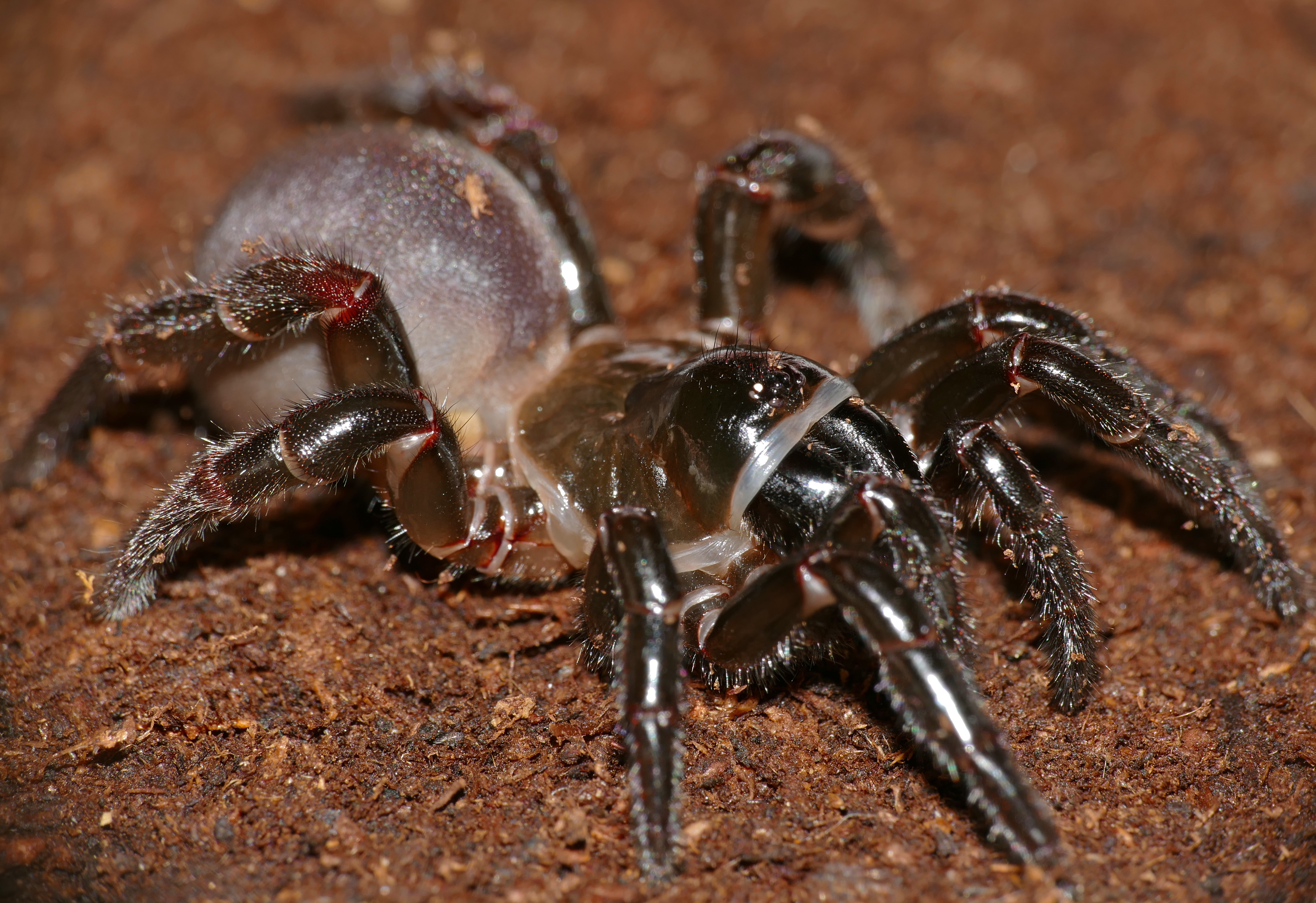
- C. sauvagesi
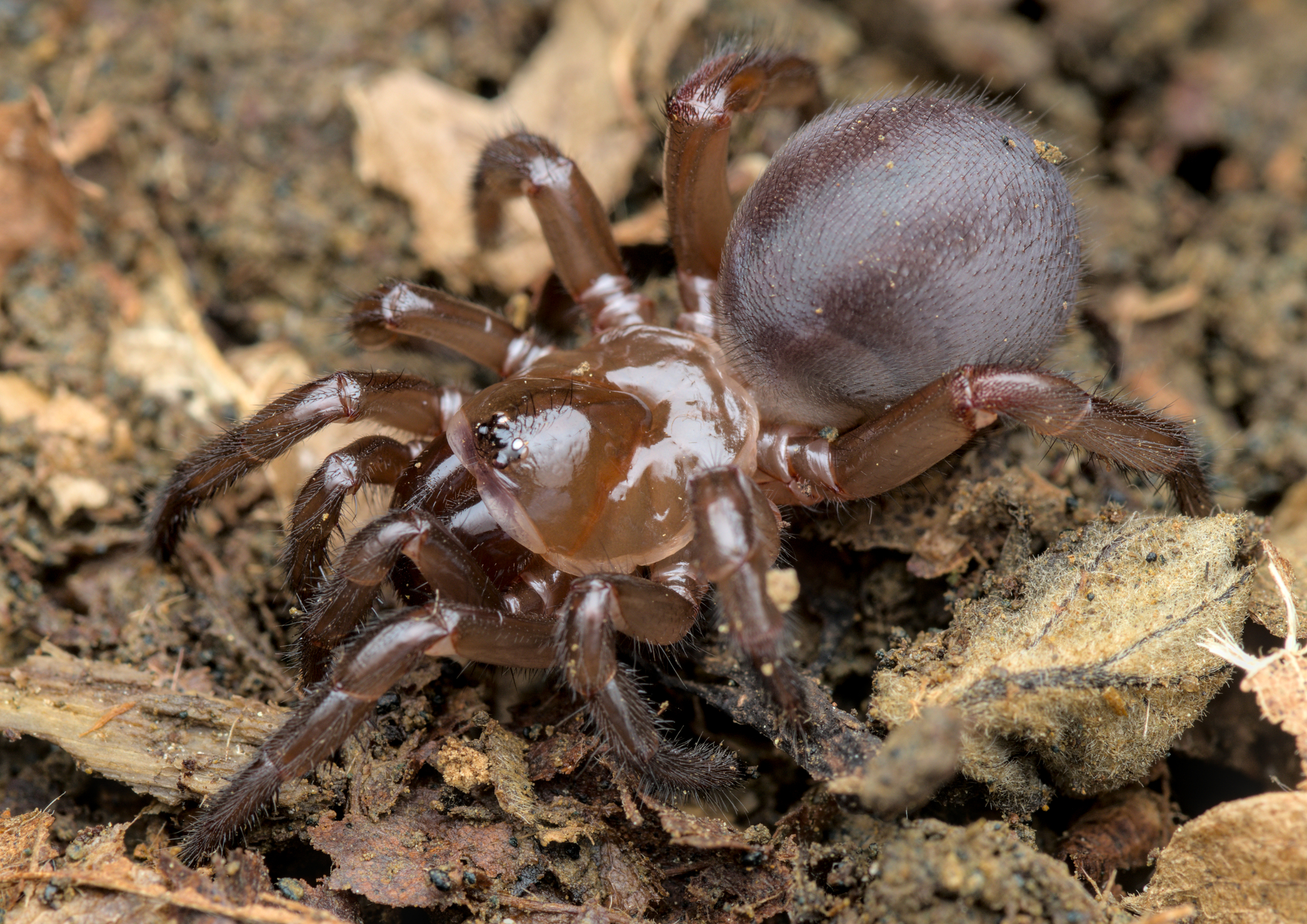
- C. moggridgei

Scientific classification
- Kingdom: Animalia
- Phylum: Arthropoda
- Subphylum: Chelicerata
- Class: Arachnida
- Order: Araneae
- Infraorder: Mygalomorphae
- Family: Ctenizidae
- Genus: Cteniza; Latreille, 1829

Type species
- C. sauvagesi (Rossi, 1788)

Species
- C. genevieveae Canard, 2018; C. moggridgei O. Pickard-Cambridge, 1874; C. sauvagesi (Rossi, 1788)

Synonyms
- Aepycephalus Ausserer, 1871; Sterrhochrotus Simon, 1892

= Cteniza =

Genus of spiders

Cteniza is a small genus of Old World trapdoor spiders found in France and Italy, first described by Pierre André Latreille in 1829.

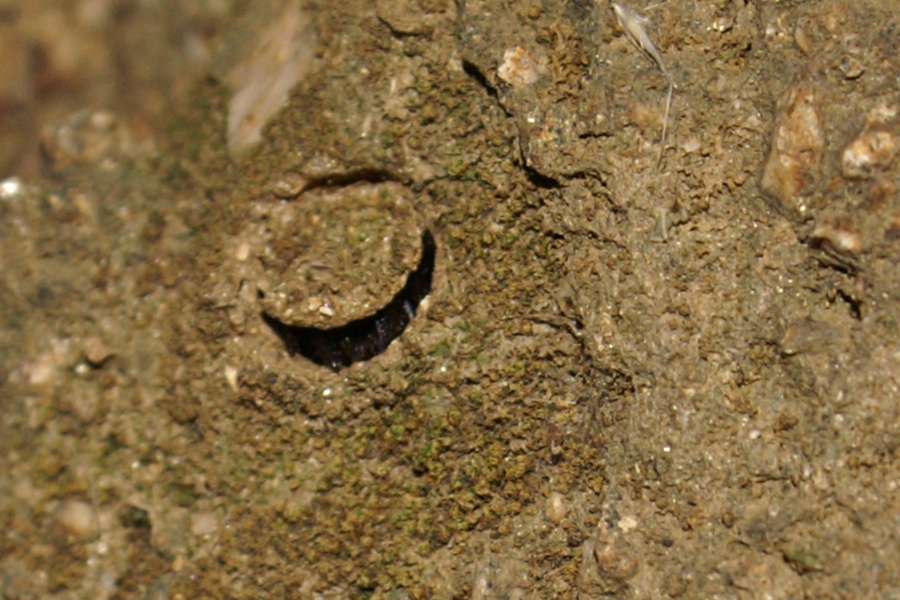
C. sauvagesi in burrow

== Species ==
As of October 2025, this genus includes three species:

- Cteniza genevieveae Canard, 2018 – France (Corsica)
- Cteniza moggridgei O. Pickard-Cambridge, 1874 – France, Italy
- Cteniza sauvagesi (Rossi, 1788) – France (Corsica), Italy (type species)
