= Bitterfeld amber =

Amber found in Germany

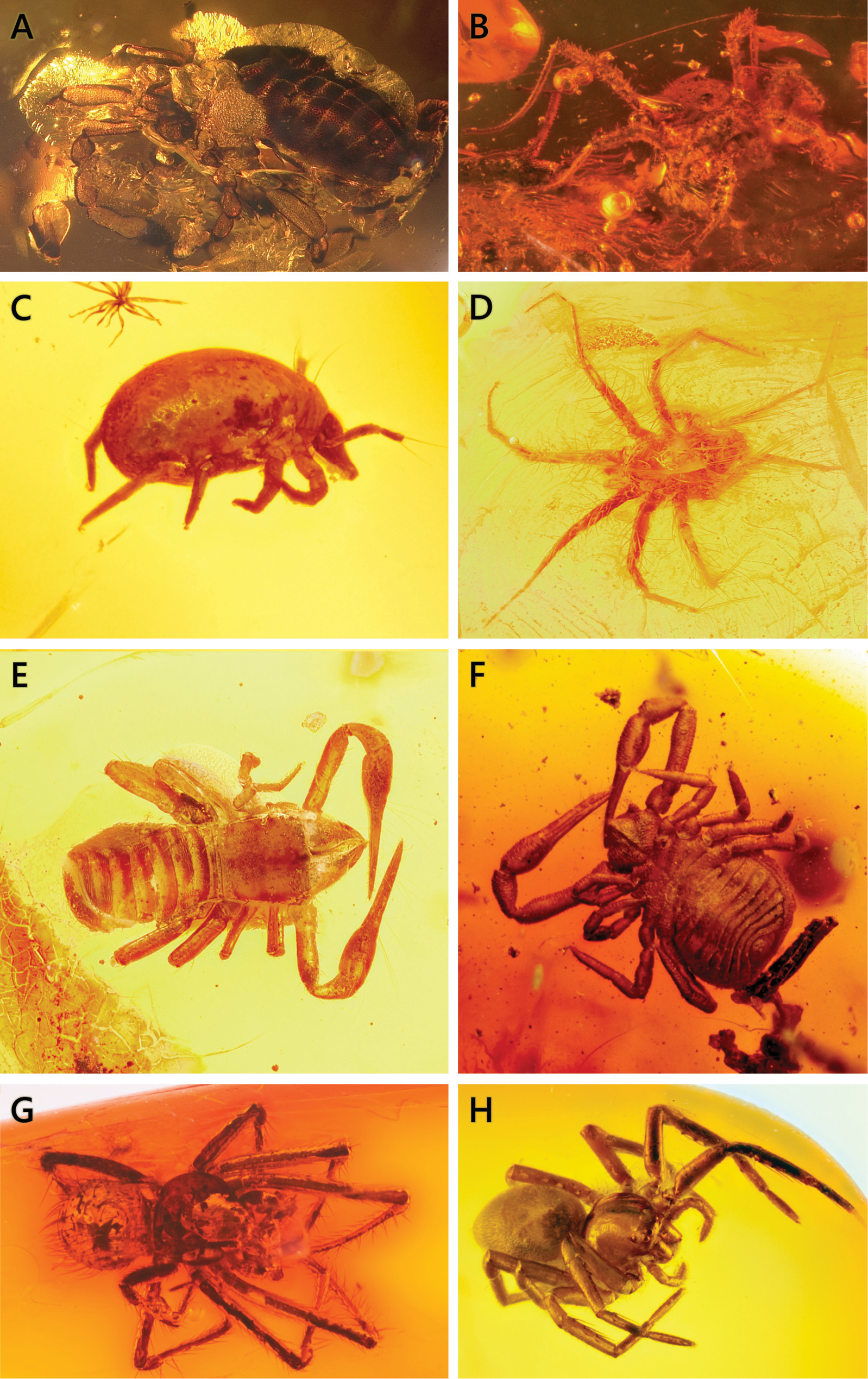
Arachnid fossils in Bitterfeld amber, including harvestmen/Opiliones belonging to the genus Siro (top row), unidentified mites (second row) pseudoscorpions belonging to the families Chthoniidae (left) and Pseudogarypidae (right) (third row), and crab spiders (bottom row)

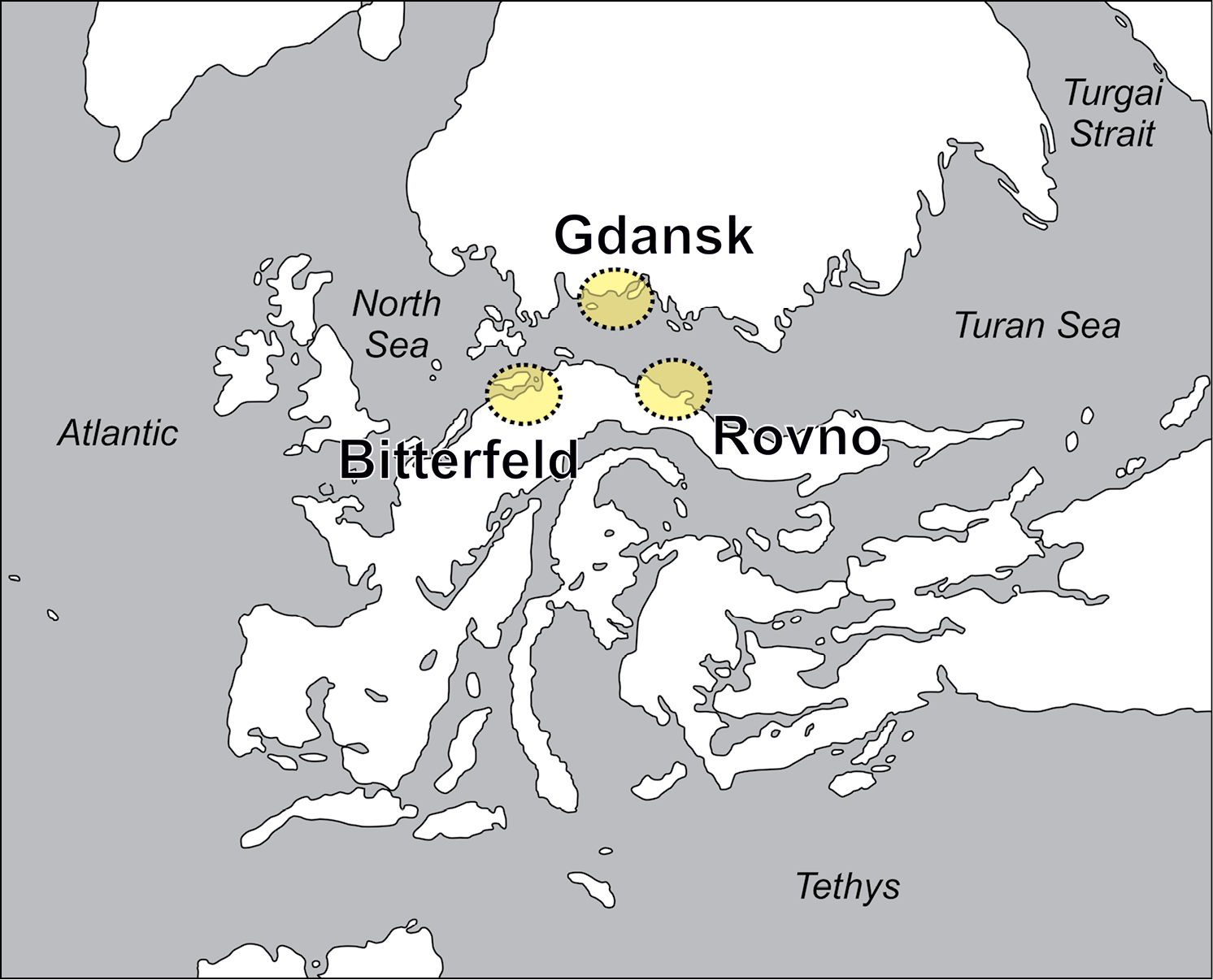
Geographic context of Bitterfeld amber in Eocene Europe, with Baltic amber (labelled "Gdansk") and Rovno amber also shown

Bitterfeld amber is amber found near the town of Bitterfeld in Saxony-Anhalt, Germany. While visually similar to the better known Baltic amber and often historically considered to be redeposited Baltic amber, chemical analysis shows that it is distinct from Baltic amber. The amber is thought to originate from the Eocene epoch, around the same time as Baltic amber. Like Baltic amber, the amber is renowned for its fossil inclusions such as those of arachnids and insects. The amber is found deposited in sands and silts of the Cottbus Formation, which is thought to be of late Oligocene age, considerably younger than the amber itself. Some fossil animal species are shared between Baltic and Bitterfeld ambers, supporting the idea that they were deposited at the same time, while both ambers have species apparently unique to them. The amber bearing deposit was excavated as part of a lignite coal mining operation active from 1975 to 1993, which resulted in over 400 tonnes of amber being unearthed. Compared to Baltic amber, the Bitterfeld amber has been subject to considerably less research. The amber likely originated from a forested environment, perhaps a swamp forest. The source tree is suggested to have either belonged to Sciadopityaceae or to Pinaceae.
