= 2009 in arthropod paleontology =

This list of fossil arthropods described in 2009 is a list of new taxa of trilobites, fossil insects, crustaceans, arachnids and other fossil arthropods that were described during the year 2009, as well as other significant discoveries and events related to arthropod paleontology that occurred that year.

== Radiodonts ==
Name	Novelty	Status	Authors	Age	Unit	Location	Notes	Images
Schinderhannes	gen et sp nov	Valid	Kühl, Briggs, & Rust	Lower Devonian	Hunsrück Slate	Germany		

== Arachnids ==
Name	Novelty	Status	Authors	Age	Unit	Location	Notes	Images
Palaeoperenethis	Gen. et sp. nov	Valid	Selden & Penney	Eocene; Ypresian	Okanagan Highlands; Horsefly Shales	Canada; British Columbia	A pisaurid fishing spider	

== Crustaceans ==
Name	Novelty	Status	Authors	Age	Unit	Location	Notes	Images
Chabardella	Gen. et sp. nov	Valid	Racheboeuf, Schram & Vidal	Late Carboniferous; Stephanian	Montceau-les-Mines	France	A mantis shrimp, type species is C. spinosa	
Sottyella	Gen. et sp. nov	Valid	Racheboeuf, Schram & Vidal	Late Carboniferous; Stephanian	Montceau-les-Mines	France	A phreatoicidean isopod, type species is S. montcellensis	

== Insects ==
Name	Novelty	Status	Authors	Age	Unit	Location	Notes	Images
Agulla mineralensis	sp nov	Valid	Engel	Late Barstovian	Stewart Valley Group	USA	only described Neogene snakefly fossil	
Allorapisma	gen et sp nov	Valid	Makarkin & Archibald	Ypresian	Tom Thumb Tuff member Klondike Mountain Formation	USA		Allorapisma chuorum
Apis (Cascapis) nearctica	sp nov	Valid	Engel, Hinojosa-Diaz, & Rasnitsyn	Middle Miocene		USA	The first fossil Apis from North America.	
Aspidopleura	gen et sp nov	Valid	Gibson	Eocene	Baltic amber	Europe	A Eupelmid wasp	Aspidopleura baltica
Brevivulva	gen et sp nov	Valid	Gibson	Eocene	Baltic amber	Europe	A Eupelmid wasp	Brevivulva electroma
Cimbrophlebia brooksi	sp nov	Valid	Archibald	Ypresian	Tom Thumb Tuff member Klondike Mountain Formation	USA	A Cimbrophlebiid scorpionfly	
Cimbrophlebia flabelliformis	sp nov	Valid	Archibald	Ypresian	McAbee Fossil Beds	Canada	A mecopteran	
Cimbrophlebia leahyi	sp nov	Valid	Archibald	Ypresian	McAbee Fossil Beds	Canada	A mecopteran	
Cimbrophlebia westae	sp nov	Valid	Archibald	Ypresian	Tom Thumb Tuff member Klondike Mountain Formation	USA	A mecopteran	
Ctenobethylus oblongiceps	comb nov	Jr synonym	(Wheeler, 1915)	Lutetian	Baltic amber	Russia	Fossil Dolichoderine ant. Moved from Iridomyrmex oblongiceps to Eldermyrmex oblongiceps in 2011.	Eldermyrmex oblongiceps
Denaeaspis	gen et sp nov	valid	Chaboo & Engel	Eocene; Bridgerian	Green River Formation; Parachute Creek Member	USA; Colorado	An Imatidiini tribe Cassidine tortoise beetle. The type species is D. chelonopsis	
Eosacantha	gen et sp nov	valid	Chaboo & Engel	Eocene; Bridgerian	Green River Formation; Parachute Creek Member	USA; Colorado	An Imatidiini tribe Cassidine tortoise beetle. The type species is E. delocranioides	
Gesomyrmex germanicus	sp nov	Valid	Dlussky, Wappler, & Wedmann	Lutetian	Eckfeld Maar	Germany	A Formicinae ant	Gesomyrmex germanicus
Gesomyrmex pulcher	sp nov	Valid	Dlussky, Wappler, & Wedmann	Lutetian	Messel Formation	Germany	A Formicinae ant	Gesomyrmex pulcher
Leptofoenus pittfieldae	sp nov	Valid	Engel	Burdigalian	Dominican amber	Dominican Republic	A Pteromalid wasp	Leptofoenus pittfieldae
Metapelma archetypon	sp nov	Valid	Gibson	Eocene	Baltic amber	Europe	A Eupelmid wasp	Metapelma archetypon
Neanaperiallus	gen et sp nov	Valid	Gibson	Eocene	Baltic amber	Europe	A Eupelmid wasp	Neanaperiallus masneri
Nesagapostemon	gen et sp nov	Valid	Engel	Burdigalian	Dominican amber	Dominican Republic	A Halictid bee	Nesagapostemon moronei
Nymphes georgei	sp nov	Valid	Archibald, Makarkin, & Ansorge	Ypresian	Tom Thumb Tuff member Klondike Mountain Formation	USA	A Nymphid neuropteran	Nymphes georgei
Oligochlora semirugosa	sp nov	Valid	Engel	Burdigalian	Dominican amber	Dominican Republic	A Halictid bee	Oligochlora semirugosa
Paleohabropoda	Gen et sp nov	valid	Michez & Ramont	Thanetian	Menat Formation	France	An anthophorine bee	Paleohabropoda oudardi
Paratrechina pygmaea	Comb nov	Jr synonym	(Mayr)	Middle Eocene	European amber	Europe	A formicine ant, new combination for Prenolepis pygmaea; jr synonym of Nylanderia pygmaea	Nylanderia pygmaea
Principiala rudgwickensis	sp nov	valid	Jepson, Makarkin, & Jarzembowski	Barremian	Upper Weald Clay	England	An Ithonidae lacewing, a second species of Principiala	
Proceratium eocenicum	Sp nov	Valid	Dlussky	Late Eocene	Baltic amber	Russia	A ponerine ant	Proceratium eocenicum
Pronymphes hoffeinsorum	Sp nov	Valid	Archibald, Makarkin, Ansorge	Priabonian	Baltic amber	Russia	A Nymphid neuropteran	
Protomyrmica	Gen et sp nov	valid	Dlussky & Radchenko	Priabonian	Baltic amber	Russia	A myrmicine ant	Protomyrmica atavia
Termitaradus mitnicki	sp nov	Valid	Engel	Burdigalian	Dominican amber	Dominican Republic	A termite bug	Termitaradus mitnicki
Tetraponera groehni	sp nov	Valid	Dlussky	Pribonian	Baltic amber	Russia	A Pseudomyrmecine ant	Tetraponera groehni

== Trilobites ==
Name	Novelty	Status	Authors	Age	Unit	Location	Notes	Images
Alperillaenus	Gen. et sp. nov	Valid	Pour, Popov & Vinogradova	Ordovician (Darriwilian)		Kazakhstan	A member of the family Illaenidae. Genus includes new species A. intermedius.	
Ammagnostus antarcticus	Sp. nov	Valid	Bentley, Jago & Cooper	Cambrian	Goyder Formation; Spurs Formation	Antarctica; Australia		
Asaphellus stubbsi	Sp. nov	Valid	Fortey	Ordovician (Tremadocian)	Fezouata Formation	Morocco		
Bhargavia	Gen. et sp. et comb. nov	Valid	Peng et al.	Wuliuan	Parahio Formation	India; United States	A member of the family Ellipsocephalidae. The type species is B. prakritika; genus also includes "Syspacephalus" obscurus Palmer and Halley (1979).	
Bienvillia chaya	Sp. nov	Valid	Waisfeld & Vaccari	Ordovician (Floian)	Suri Formation	Argentina		
Catillicephalina	Gen. et comb. nov	Valid	Bentley, Jago & Cooper	Cambrian	Spurs Formation	Antarctica	A new genus for "Catillicephala" glasgowensis Jago & Cooper (2005).	
Damiraspis	Gen. et sp. nov	Valid	Pour, Popov & Vinogradova	Ordovician (Darriwilian)		Kazakhstan	An asaphid trilobite. Genus includes new species D. margiana.	
Degamella lingulata	Sp. nov	Valid	Zhou & Zhou	Ordovician	Pagoda Formation	China	A member of the family Cyclopygidae.	
Dividuagnostus tortelloi	Sp. nov	Valid	Waisfeld & Vaccari	Ordovician (Floian)	Suri Formation	Argentina		
Doremataspis contracta	Sp. nov	Valid	Bentley, Jago & Cooper	Cambrian	Spurs Formation	Antarctica		
Farasaphus	Gen. et sp. nov	Valid	Pour, Popov & Vinogradova	Ordovician (Darriwilian)		Kazakhstan	An asaphid trilobite. Genus includes new species F. singularis.	
Gunnia smithi	Sp. nov	Valid	Peng et al.	Wuliuan	Parahio Formation	India	A member of the family Ptychopariidae.	
Haydenaspis	Gen. et sp. nov	Valid	Peng et al.	Cambrian Stage 4	Parahio Formation	India	A member of the family Dinesidae. The type species is H. parvatya.	
Himalisania	Gen. et comb. nov	Valid	Peng et al.	Cambrian (Guzhangian)	Karsha Formation; Kurgiakh Formation	India; China?	A member of the family Lisaniidae. The type species is "Eoshengia" sudani Jell & Hughes (1997).	
Hypermecaspis edselbrussai	Sp. nov	Valid	Waisfeld & Vaccari	Ordovician (Floian)	Suri Formation	Argentina		
Jamrogia	Gen. et sp. nov	Valid	Bentley, Jago & Cooper	Cambrian	Spurs Formation	Antarctica	A member of the new family Jamrogiidae. Genus includes new species J. jamrogensis.	
Kaotaia prachina	Sp. nov	Valid	Peng et al.	Wuliuan	Parahio Formation	India	A member of the family Ptychopariidae.	
Koldinia odelli	Sp. nov	Valid	Peng et al.	Cambrian (Guzhangian)	Karsha Formation	India	Possibly a member of the family Anomocaridae.	
Litzicurus	Gen. et sp. et comb. nov	Valid	Adrain, McAdams & Westrop	Early Ordovician		United States	Possibly a member of Hystricuridae. Genus includes new species L. shawi, as well as "Pseudohystricurus" orbus Ross (1953).	
Microparia (Quadratapyge) obsoleta	Sp. nov	Valid	Zhou & Zhou	Ordovician	Pagoda Formation	China	A member of the family Cyclopygidae.	
Monanocephalus liquani	Sp. nov	Valid	Peng et al.	Wuliuan	Hsuchuang Formation	China	A member of the family Ptychopariidae.	
Nileus jafari	Sp. nov	Valid	Pour & Turvey	Ordovician (Dapingian to early Darriwilian)	Shirgesht Formation	Iran	A member of the family Nileidae.	
Proasaphiscus simoni	Sp. nov	Valid	Peng et al.	Wuliuan	Parahio Formation	India	A member of the family Proasaphiscidae.	
Probowmania bhatti	Sp. nov	Valid	Peng et al.	Cambrian Stage 4	Parahio Formation	India	A member of the family Ptychopariidae.	
Prozacanthoides lahiri	Sp. nov	Valid	Peng et al.	Cambrian Stage 4	Parahio Formation	India	A member of the family Zacanthoididae.	
Psalikilus hestoni	Sp. nov	Valid	Adrain, McAdams & Westrop	Early Ordovician		United States		
Sudanomocarina sinindica	Sp. nov	Valid	Peng et al.	Wuliuan	Parahio Formation	India	A member of the family Proasaphiscidae.	
Torifera jelli	Sp. nov	Valid	Peng et al.	Cambrian (Guzhangian)	Karsha Formation; Kurgiakh Formation	India	A member of the family Alsataspididae.	
Warburtonella	Gen. et sp. nov	Valid	Sun & Jago	Cambrian (Furongian)	Warburton Basin	Australia	A polymerid trilobite. Genus includes new species W. coongiensis.	
Xingrenaspis parthiva	Sp. nov	Valid	Peng et al.	Wuliuan	Parahio Formation	India	A member of the family Ptychopariidae.	
Xingrenaspis shyamalae	Sp. nov	Valid	Peng et al.	Wuliuan	Parahio Formation	India	A member of the family Ptychopariidae.	
