= Kaliningrad Amber Combine =

Amber mine in Russia

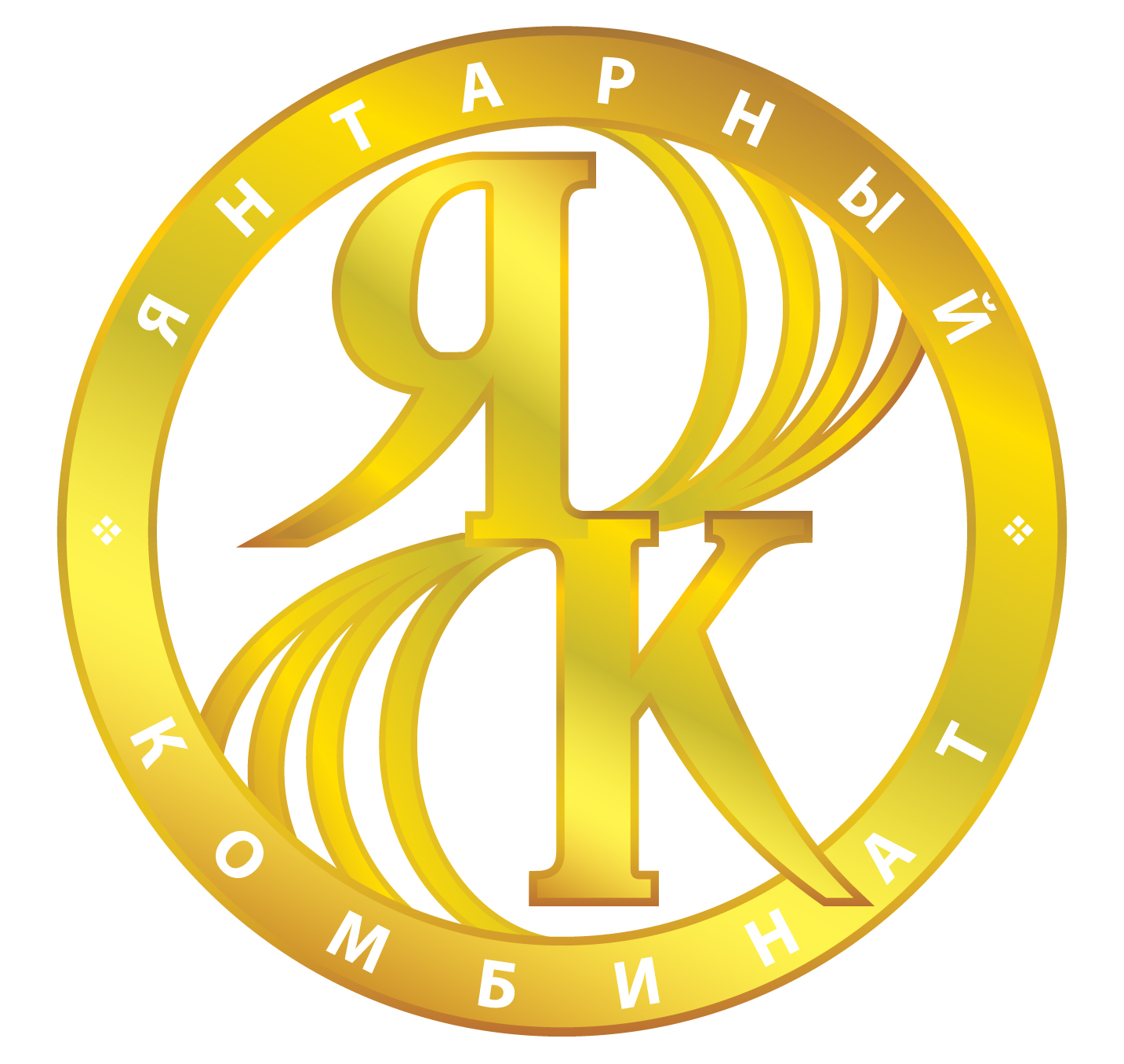
- Type: Joint-stock company
- Industry: Resource extraction
- Headquarters: Yantarny, Russia
- Revenue: ₽1.19 billion (2016)
- Net income: ₽209 million (2016)
- Number of employees: 986 (2016)
- Parent: Rostec
- Website: Official website

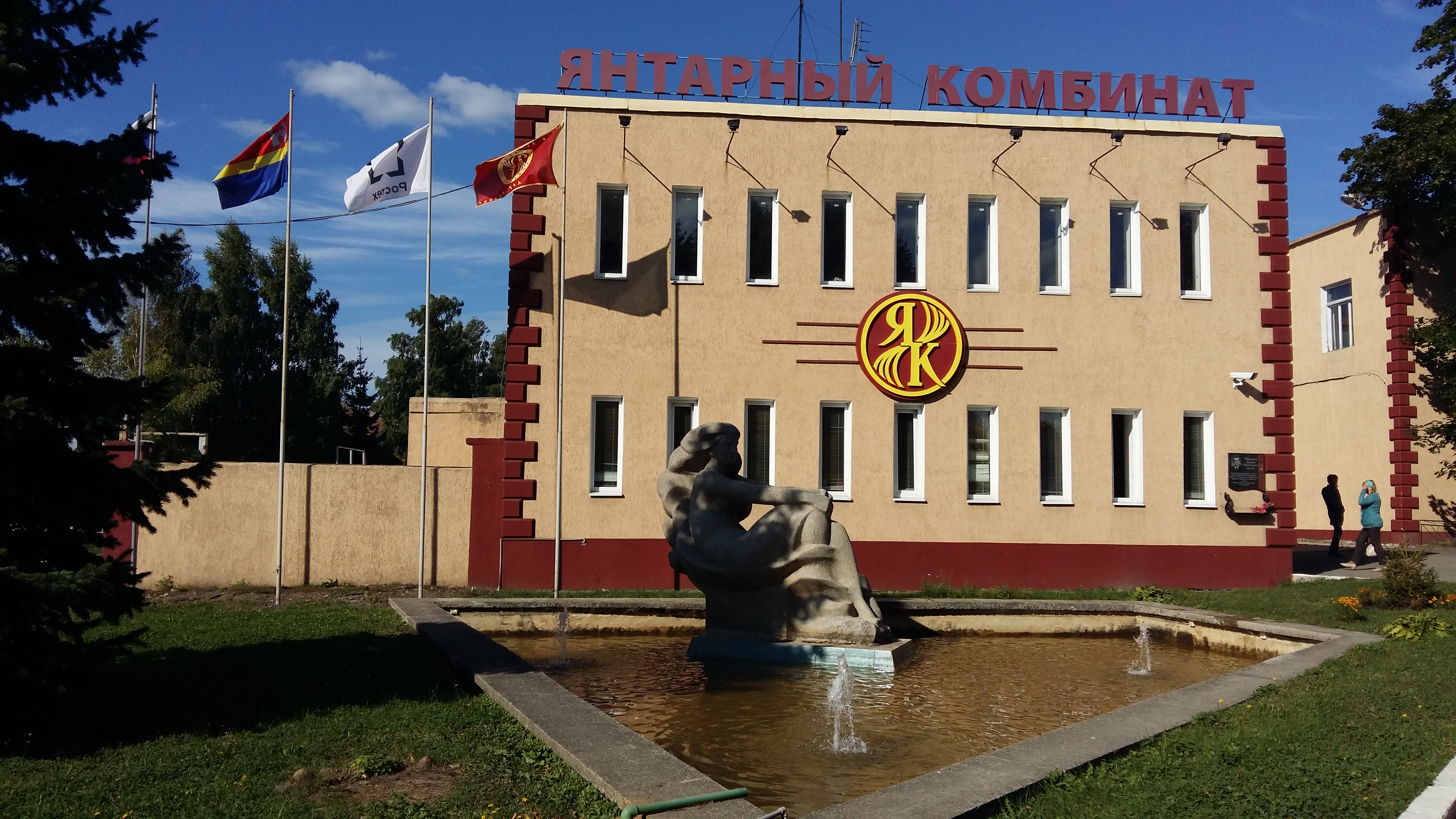
Kaliningrad Amber Combine

Joint Stock Company Kaliningrad Amber Combine (Russian: Калининградский янтарный комбинат) is the only official amber mine in Russia, located in Yantarny, Kaliningrad Oblast. The combine extracts up to 400 tonnes of amber annually, and is owned by the state corporation Rostec.

The region around the combine holds 90% of the world's extractable amber, and the Kaliningrad Combine accounts for 65% of the global amber market. Most of the combine's production is sold to China.

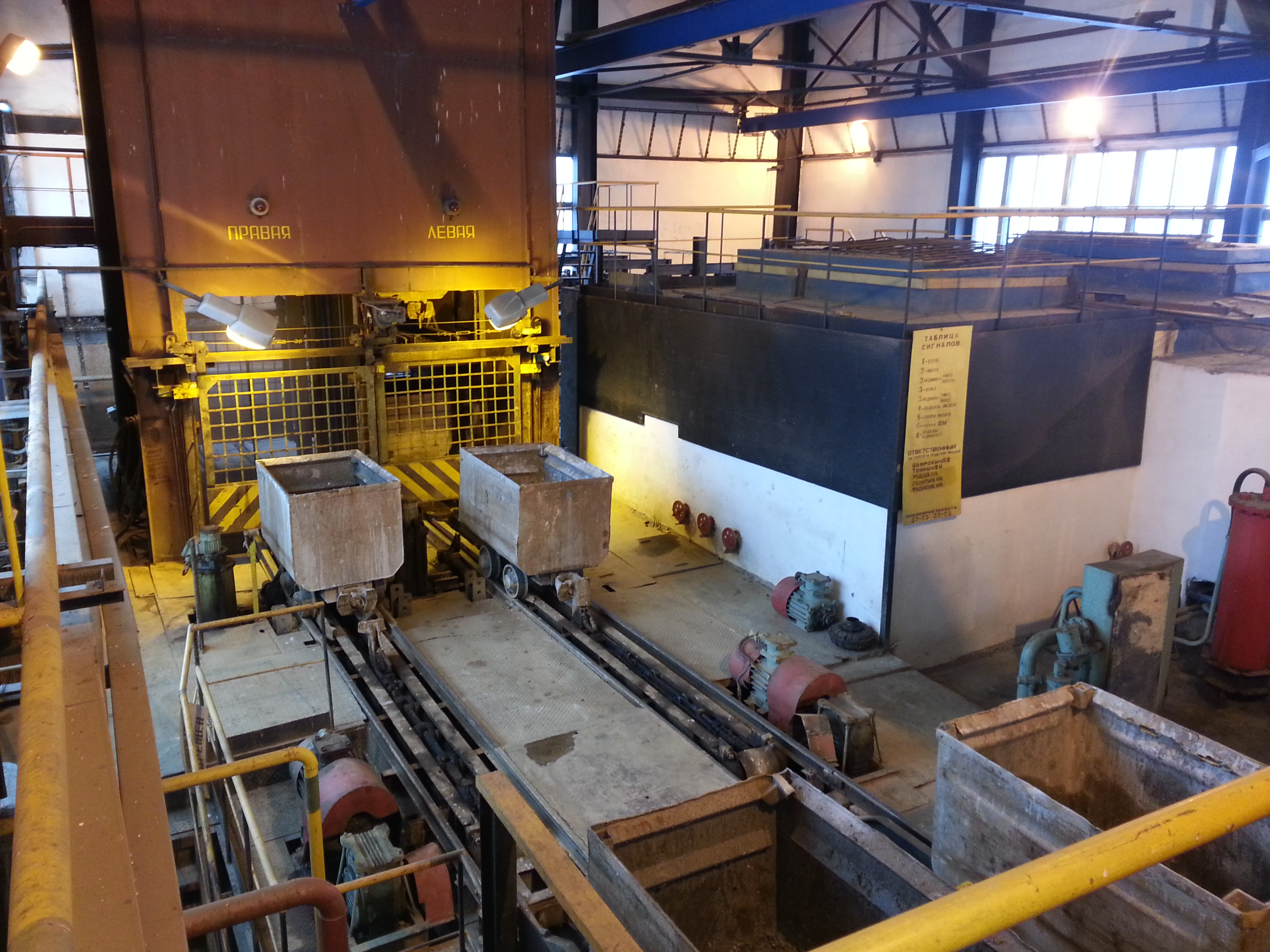
Malysheva emerald mine

The Kaliningrad Combine also owns the Malyshevskoye emerald mine in Malysheva, Sverdlovsk Oblast, the only commercial emerald mine in Russia, and produces beryllium ores and concentrates in the same facility. In 2017 the company held Russia's first emerald auction on the Saint Petersburg Stock Exchange.

== History ==
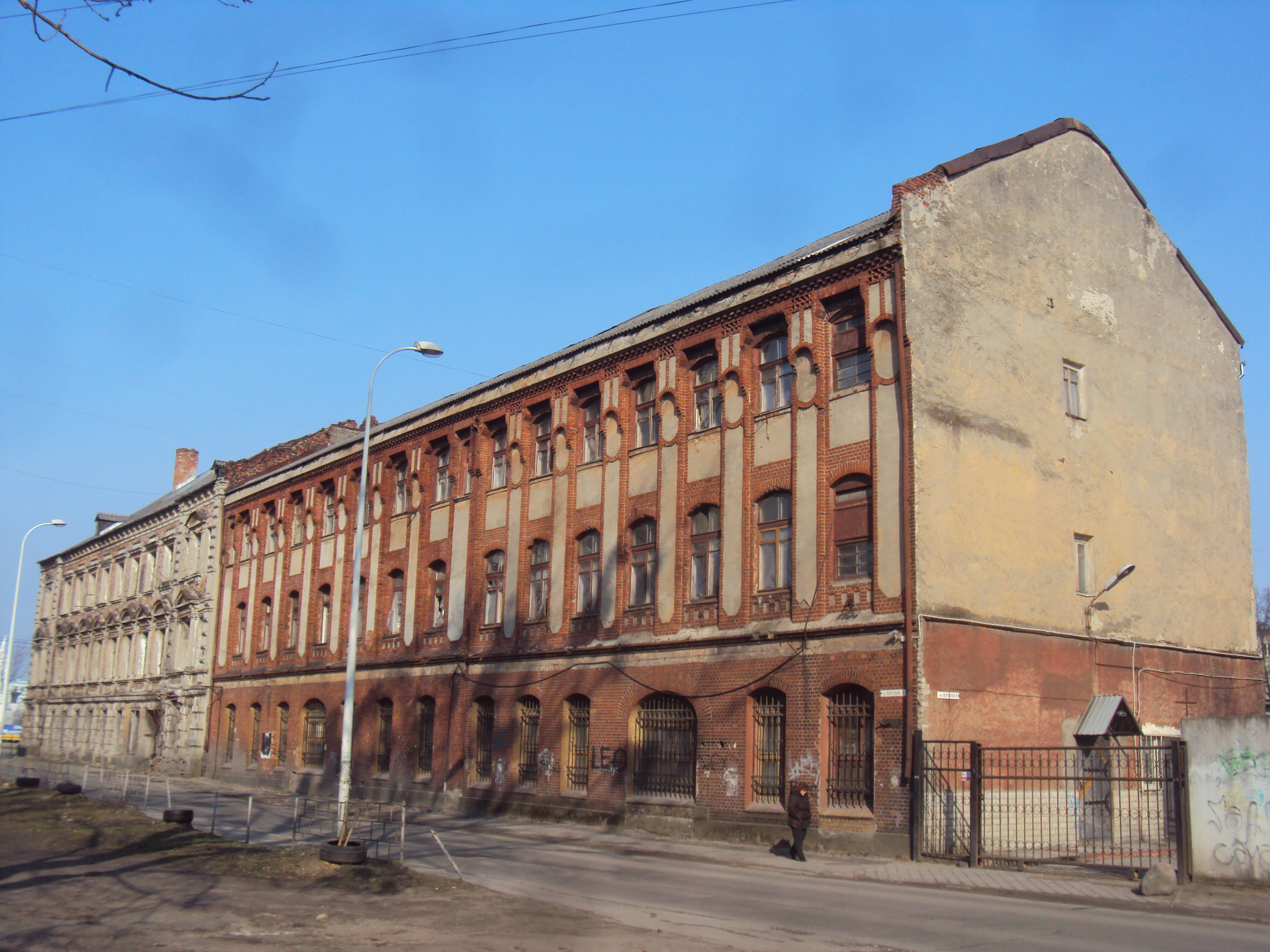
Building of the former Königsberg Amber Factory

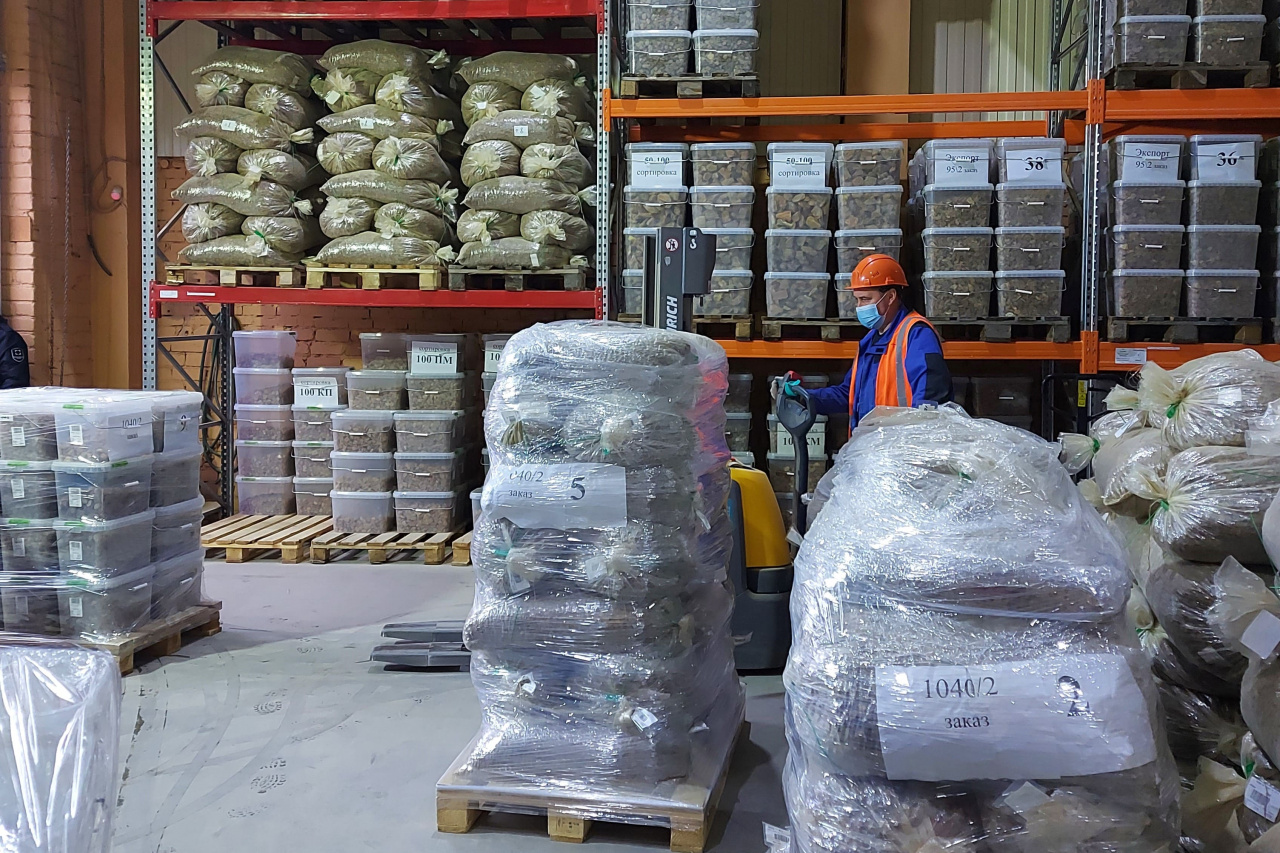
Warehouse of raw amber at the Amber Combine

The Kaliningrad Amber Combine, the world's biggest enterprise for the mining and processing of amber, was established in 1947 on the basis of the Königsberg Amber Factory, which was part of the amber manufacturing industry of East Prussia.

The Königsberg Amber Factory had its origins in the second half of the 19th century, when the Stantien & Becker company leased the Palmniken quarry from the government. Stantien & Becker introduced industrial methods to amber mining, by employing steam-powered excavators. The East Prussian government terminated the company's lease in 1899, granting amber extraction rights to the state-owned Koeniglichen Bernsteinwerke.

In the same year, Stantien & Becker started an amber processing operation in Königsberg, which employed 600 workers by 1912 and processed about 80 tons of amber. The amber business was purchased by Preussag AG in 1924.

After the Nazis gained power in 1933 the government centralized the management of amber extraction and production to Berlin. In general, however, they were uninterested in boosting amber production, preferring to focus investment on military industries.

After the end of World War II the company came under Soviet ownership, and was re-established in 1947; over the following decades the enterprise developed successfully, using forced labour, increasing the mining, assortment and volumes of production output - from mass amber product lines to dielectric isolators, lacquers, enamel paints and components for chemical industry. The two gulags, one for men who worked in the mine, one for women who worked in the factory, were disbanded in 1953 on Stalin's death.

1958 saw the introduction of hydraulic mining, a safer and more economic method compared to the excavation mining operations, which risked causing significant landslides. Hydraulic mining continues to the present day.

The Walter quarry was opened in 1912. When its resources had been depleted in 1976 the new Primorsky quarry was commissioned, where mining continues to this day. The project envisaged a more modern technology of amber mining and processing, with the use of a multi-bucket excavator for excavating amber rock into a concentrating factory by using sea water.

The company was privatized during the early 1990s, but the decision was annulled by the Kaliningrad Regional Court due to the unique nature of the company. In 2015 it was transferred to the state corporation Rostec with a presidential decree. In 2015 it had 1.3 billion rubles in revenues, and extracted 310 tons of amber.

== Awards ==
Badge of Honour "For Success in Labour" (22 April 2022), for the high performance achieved in production activities.

== Philately ==
In 2022 postage stamps dedicated to the Kaliningrad Amber Combine were issued. Amber products.

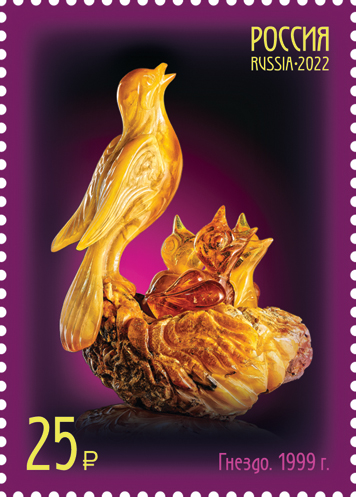
"The Nest" (1999)

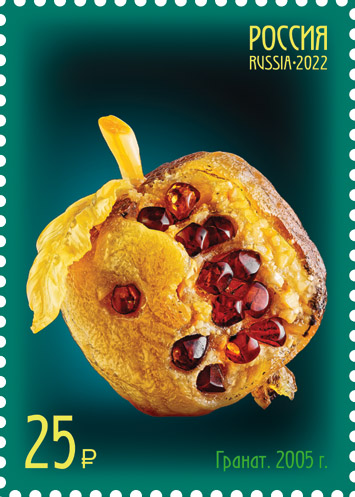
"Garnet" (2005)

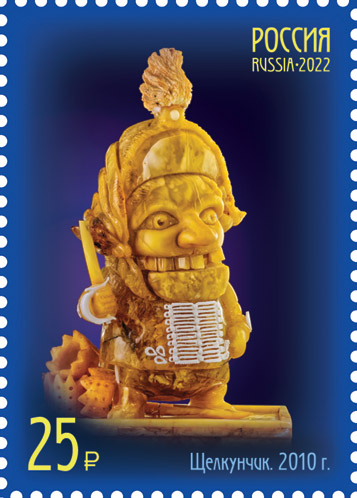
"The Nutcracker" (2010)

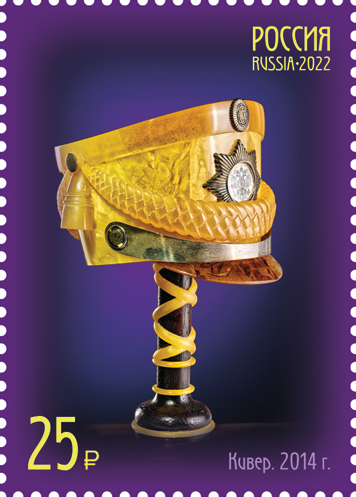
"Shako" (2014)

== See also ==
- Baltic amber
- Kaliningrad Amber Museum
