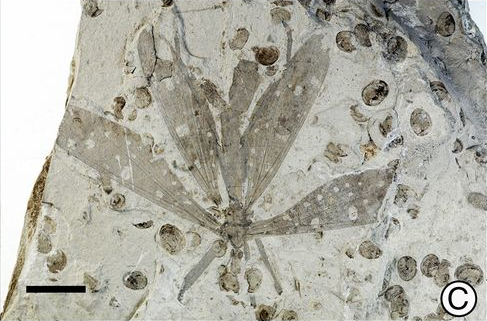
- Juracimbrophlebia ginkgofolia holotype

Scientific classification
- Kingdom: Animalia
- Phylum: Arthropoda
- Clade: Pancrustacea
- Class: Insecta
- Order: Mecoptera
- Family: †Cimbrophlebiidae
- Genus: †Juracimbrophlebia; Wang et al. 2012
- Species: †J. ginkgofolia

Binomial name
- †Juracimbrophlebia ginkgofolia Wang et al. 2012

= Juracimbrophlebia =

Juracimbrophlebia Temporal range: Middle Jurassic

Extinct genus of insects

Juracimbrophlebia is an extinct genus of hangingflies that lived during the Middle Jurassic Period about 165 million years ago, containing only its type species, Juracimbrophlebia ginkgofolia; it was discovered in deposits from Daohugou in northeastern China’s Inner Mongolia.

The insect was selected by the International Institute for Species Exploration at Arizona State University as one of the Top 10 New Species discovered in 2012 out of more than 140 nominated species. The uniqueness is its striking resemblance to the fossilized leaves with which it was discovered, indicating one of the earliest known instances of biological mimicry. The selection was announced on 22 May 2013.

== Etymology ==
Juracimbrophlebia ginkgofolia is the only species so far described under the genus. The generic name is derived from a combination of Jura- and cimbrophlebia (for the type genus of the family Cimbrophlebiidae), referring to the Jurassic age and its scorpionfly nature; and the specific name ginkgofolia is the combination of Latin word ginkgo and a suffix -folia to imply the characteristic ginkgo-leaf-like wings.

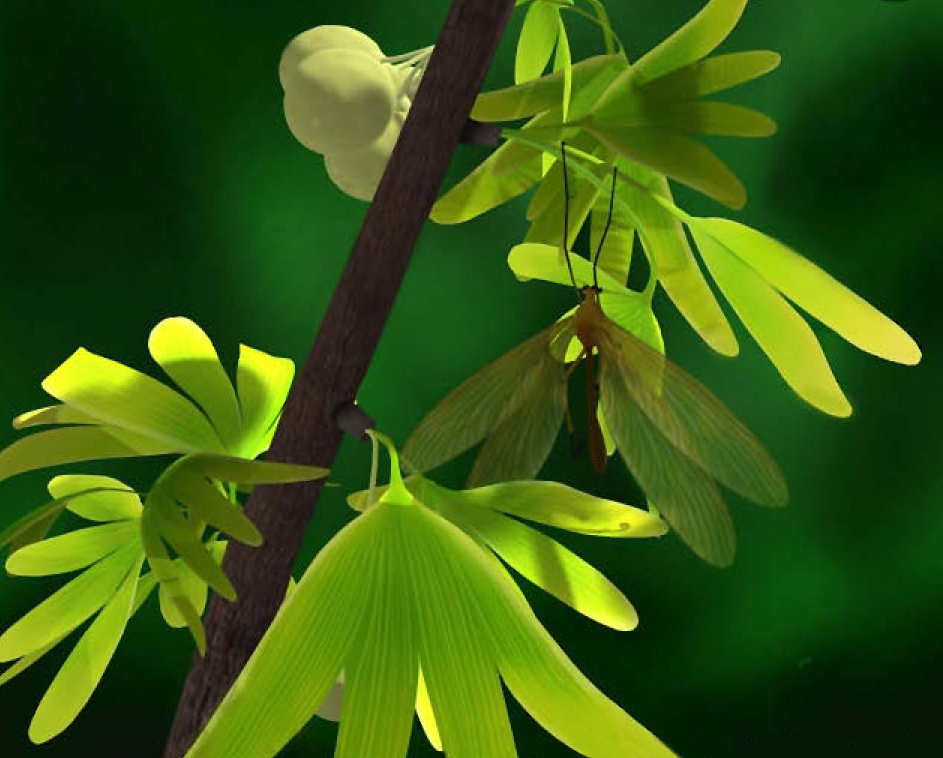
Artists reconstruction of J. ginkgofolia among Ginkgoites leaves

== Description ==
The fossil is of the compressed insect exoskeleton. The holotype (CNU-MEC-NN-2010-050P/C) is now at the Key Laboratory of Insect Evolution and Environmental Changes of the Capital Normal University. It consists of a nearly complete body (less than 4 cm (1.6 in) in length) with its four wings present, however, the wing apexes, genital region, and parts of antennae and legs are missing. The compound eyes are prominent and occupy most of the lateral head that was originally exposed. The legs are extremely long and gracile, and are covered by numerous circular pubescence. Up to eight segments of the abdomen are preserved, but the terminal ones are missing making it impossible to determine the sex. The most important diagnostic features are the wings, the branches and venation of which are strikingly similar to those of the ginkgoean leaves. The resemblance is further augmented by specific patterns of spots and stripes on the wings. These make it almost indistinguishable between the two. In fact the researchers initially overlooked it as anything among the fossils of ginkgo leaves. But upon closer examination they found that it was an insect that had probably lived hanging on the leaves.

== Significance ==
It was recovered along with preserved leaves of a ginkgo-like tree, Yimaia capituliformis, in Middle Jurassic deposit of 164-165 million years of age of the Jiulongshan Formation. The most interesting find about this association was that the wings of the hangingfly and the ginkgo-like leaves are strikingly similar so much so that they are easily confused in the field. Therefore, the combination represents a rare example of mimicry between insects and plants, even before an explosive radiation of flowering plants. Unlike most other scorpionflies, which are generally quite mobile, J. ginkgofolia evidently lived sedentary on the leaves to avoid predators. This is obvious because the fauna at Daohugou is already known to host a horde of predators, including larger predatory insects, mammals, pterosaurs, and small arboreal dinosaurs . The four long wings and body of the hangingfly so perfectly matched the five hanging lobes of a single ginkgo-like leaf that it baffled the scientists even in the lab, so said Conrad Labandeira, one of discoverers from National Museum of Natural History. Thus the leaf is such a good model providing camouflage and protection, and hangingfly the mimic that avoid predation. In fact this could be the case of an (at least one of the) earliest mimicry.
