= Baltic amber =

Type of amber from the Baltic area

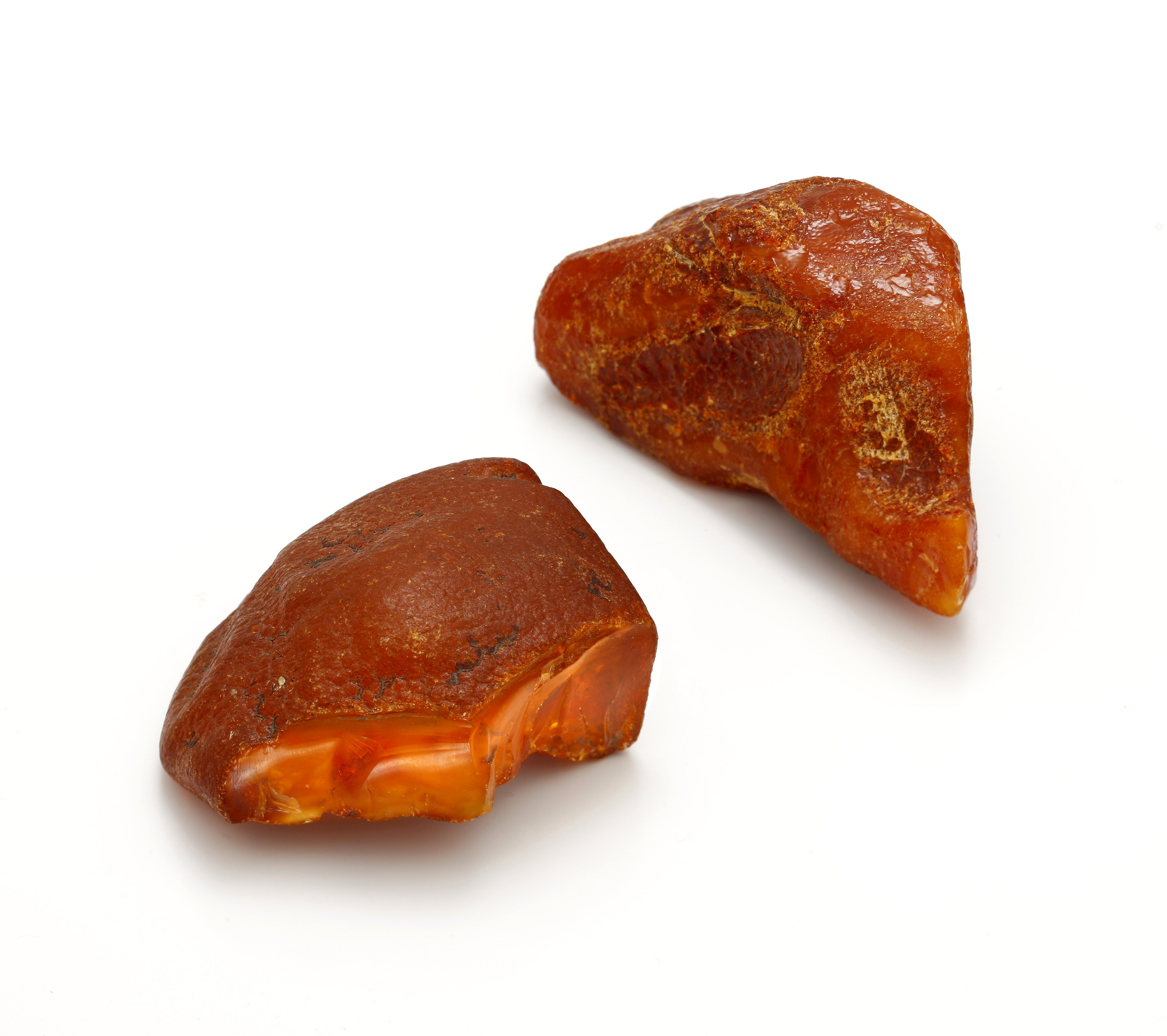
Raw unpolished Baltic amber

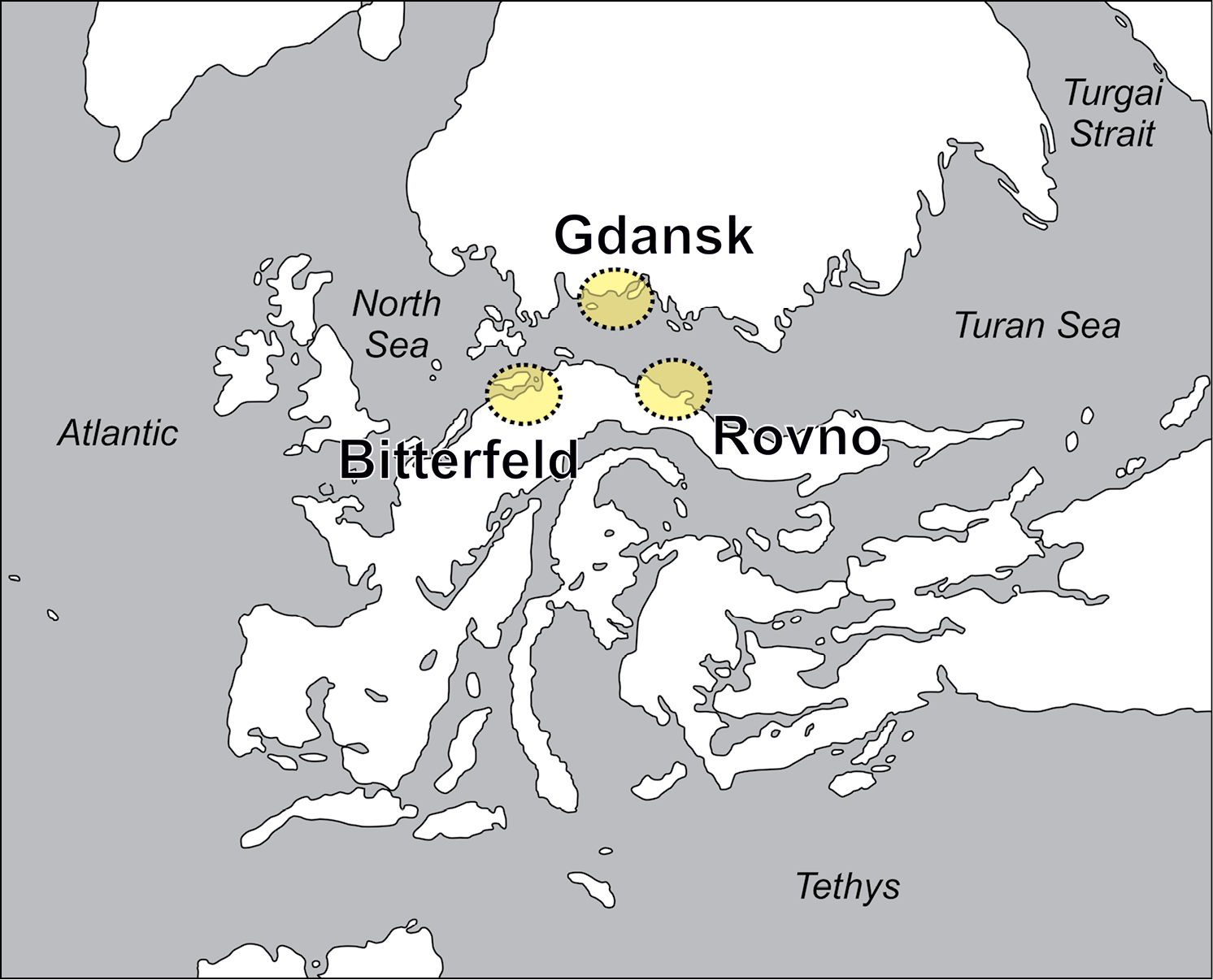
Paleogeography of Early-Mid Eocene Europe, with Baltic Amber at Gdańsk and contemporaneously deposited Rovno amber and Bitterfeld amber

Baltic amber or succinite is amber from the Baltic region, home of its largest known deposits. It was produced sometime during the Eocene epoch, but exactly when is controversial. It has been estimated that this forested region provided the resin for more than 100,000 tons of amber. Today, more than 90% of the world's amber comes from Kaliningrad Oblast of Russia. It is a major source of income for the region; the local Kaliningrad Amber Combine extracted 250 tonnes of it in 2014 and 400 tonnes in 2015. Baltic amber is also found in Poland, as well as the Baltic states.

Bitterfeld amber from the brown coal mines near Bitterfeld in Germany was previously thought to be redeposited Baltic amber, but is now known to be chemically distinct, though like with Ukrainian Rovno amber, it is thought to have been deposited around the same time as Baltic amber.

Because Baltic amber contains 3–8% succinic acid, it is also termed succinite.

== Geologic context ==
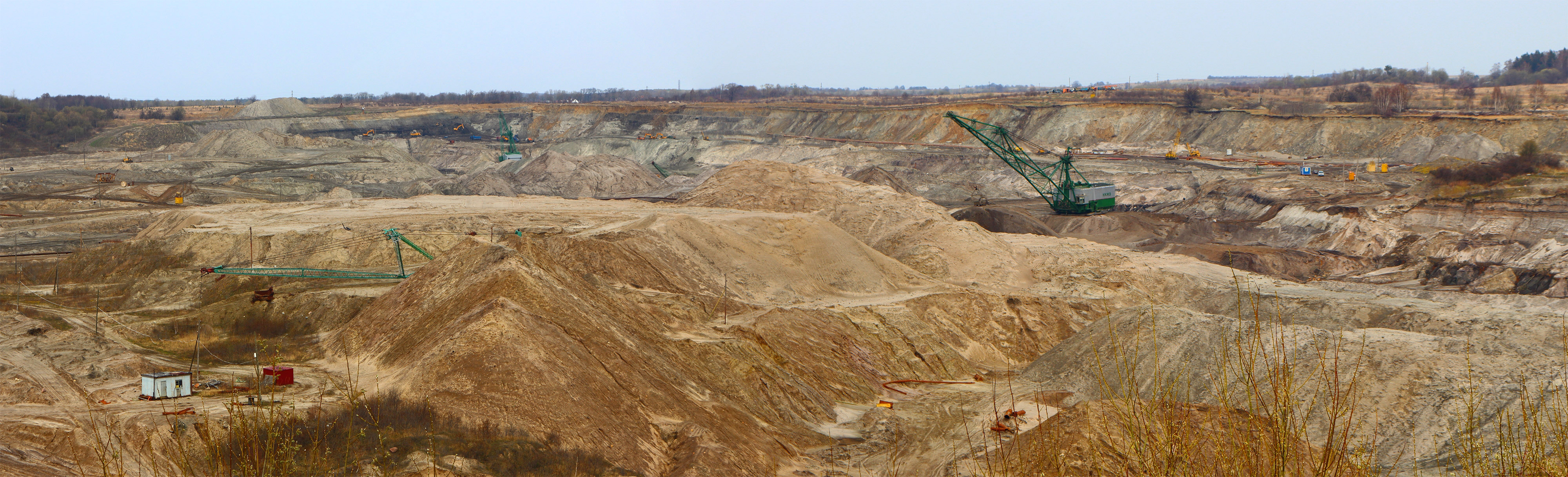
Open pit amber mine in Kaliningrad, showing the lithology of the Prussian Formation, the source rock of Baltic amber

In situ Baltic amber is derived from the sediments of the geological formation termed the Prussian Formation, formerly called the "Amber Formation", with the main amber bearing horizon being referred to as "Blue Earth", so named due to its glauconite content. The formation is exposed in the northern part of the Sambia Peninsula in Kaliningrad. Much of the Baltic amber has been secondarily redeposited in Pleistocene glacial till deposits across the North European Plain. It has been proposed that the amber is secondarily redeposited in coastal lagoonal conditions after a marine transgression of the amber forest. The age of the amber is controversial, though it is generally interpreted as having been produced during the Eocene epoch (56–34 million years ago). Different authors have given estimates of 40–47 million years ago and 35–43 million years ago as the age of the amber. Dating the amber precisely is difficult due to its redeposited context.

While the Bitterfeld amber found near Bitterfeld in Saxony-Anhalt, Germany, was historically considered redeposited Baltic amber, it has been found to be chemically distinct.

== Baltic amber tree ==
It was thought since the 1850s that the resin that became amber was produced by the tree Pinites succinifer, but research in the 1980s concluded that the resin originates from several species. More recently, it has been proposed, on the evidence of Fourier-transform infrared spectroscopy analysis of amber and resin from living trees, that conifers of the family Sciadopityaceae were responsible. The only extant representative of this family is the Japanese umbrella pine, Sciadopitys verticillata.

== Structure ==
The structure of Baltic amber (succinite) is complex. It is not a polymer, because it is not composed of a repeating pattern of mers of the same type. Rather it has a macromolecular structure arranged in a crosslinked network, in which the pores (free spaces) are filled by components of molecular structure (e.g. by mono- and sesquiterpenes). Thus the chemical structure of the amber may be described as a supramolecule. The structure makes the amber denser, harder and more resistant to external factors. It also makes possible good preservation of plant and animal inclusions.

== History of use ==
Baltic amber has been traded since the Neolithic period in Europe, with Baltic amber being found as trade goods from 3634–3363 BC in Spain. Initially Baltic amber was extracted from redeposited amber in Holocene deposits, like sandbars, with large scale industrial extraction beginning in the 19th century.

== Paleobiology ==
Numerous extinct genera and species of plants and animals have been discovered and scientifically described from inclusions in Baltic amber. Inclusions of insects make up over 98% of the animals preserved in the amber, while all other arthropods, annelids, molluscs, nematodes, and protozoans contribute less than 0.5% of the animals. Vertebrates are another 0.5% of the animals included and mostly are represented by mammal fur, feathers, and reptiles.

=== Flora ===
Taxon	Authors	Year	Family	Notes	Images
Notoscyphus balticus	Heinrichs et al.	2015	Geocalycaceae	A liverwort	
Rhizomnium dentatum	Heinrichs et al.	2014	Mniaceae	A bryopsid moss	

=== Fauna ===
==== Arthropods ====
Taxon	Authors	Year	Family	Notes	Images
Electrocteniza sadilenkoi	Eskov & Zonstein	2000	Ctenizidae	Monotypic genus of trapdoor spider found exclusively in Baltic amber.	
Pseudogarypus synchrotron	Henderickx	2012	Pseudogarypidae	Pseudoscorpion known from two fossils found at an unknown location.	

434 Beetles:

- Agroecomyrmex Wheeler, 1910
- Aphaenogaster mersa Wheeler, 1915
- Aphaenogaster oligocenica Wheeler, 1915
- Aphaenogaster sommerfeldti (Mayr, 1868)
- Arostropsis Yunakov & Kirejtshuk, 2011
- Aspidopleura Gibson, 2009
- Asymphylomyrmex Wheeler, 1915
- Baltimartyria Skalski, 1995
- Baltocteniza Eskov & Zonstein, 2000
- Brevivulva Gibson, 2009
- Deinodryinus areolatus (Ponomarenko, 1975)
- Deinodryinus velteni Guglielmino & Olmi, 2011
- Diochus electrus Chatzimanolis & Engel, 2011
- Electrinocellia Engel, 1995
- Electropodagrion Azar & Nel, 2008
- Electrostephanus Brues, 1933
- Elektrithone Makarkin, Wedmann, & Weiterschan, 2014
- Eogeometer vadens Fischer, Michalski & Hausmann, 2019
- Epiborkhausenites Skalski, 1973
- Glisachaemus Szwedo, 2007
- Gracillariites Kozlov, 1987
- Metanephrocerus collini Carpenter & Hull, 1939
- Metanephrocerus groehni Kehlmaier & Skevington, 2014
- Metanephrocerus hoffeinsorum Kehlmaier & Skevington, 2014
- Electrocrania Kuznezov, 1941
- Fibla carpenteri Engel, 1995
- Metapelma archetypon Gibson, 2009
- Micropterix gertraudae Kurz & Kurz, 2010
- Mindarus harringtoni (Hele, 2008)
- Neanaperiallus Gibson, 2009
- Palaeovespa baltica Cockerell, 1909
- Palaeovespa socialis Pionar, 2005
- Prolyonetia Kusnetzov, 1941
- Stigmellites baltica (Kozlov, 1988) (Lepidopteran leaf mines)
- Xylolaemus sakhnovi Alekseev & Lord, 2014
- Yantaromyrmex constricta (Mayr, 1868)
- Yantaromyrmex geinitzi (Mayr, 1868)
- Yantaromyrmex samlandica (Wheeler, 1915)

==== Onychophorans ====
Taxon	Authors	Year	Family	Notes	Images
Succinipatopsis balticus	Poinar	2000	Succinipatopsidae	Controversial anatomy and taxonomic status	

==== Mollusks ====
Taxon	Authors	Year	Family	Notes	Images
Acanthinula baltica					
Balticopupa gentilis					
Balticopta gusakovi	Balashov & Perkovsky	2020	Gastrocoptidae		
Carychium bergeri					
Carychium spirillum					
Carychium minusculum					
Propupa hoffeinsorum	Stworzewicz & Pokryszko	2006	Unknown Pupilloidea		
Punctum balticum					
Succinea antiqua	Colbeau	1867	Succineidae		
Truncatellina baltica					
Vertigo electrina					

==== Vertebrates ====
Taxon	Authors	Year	Family	Notes	Images
Succinilacerta succinea		1998	Lacertidae	Known from multiple specimens, including an almost complete juvenile.	

== Gallery of images ==
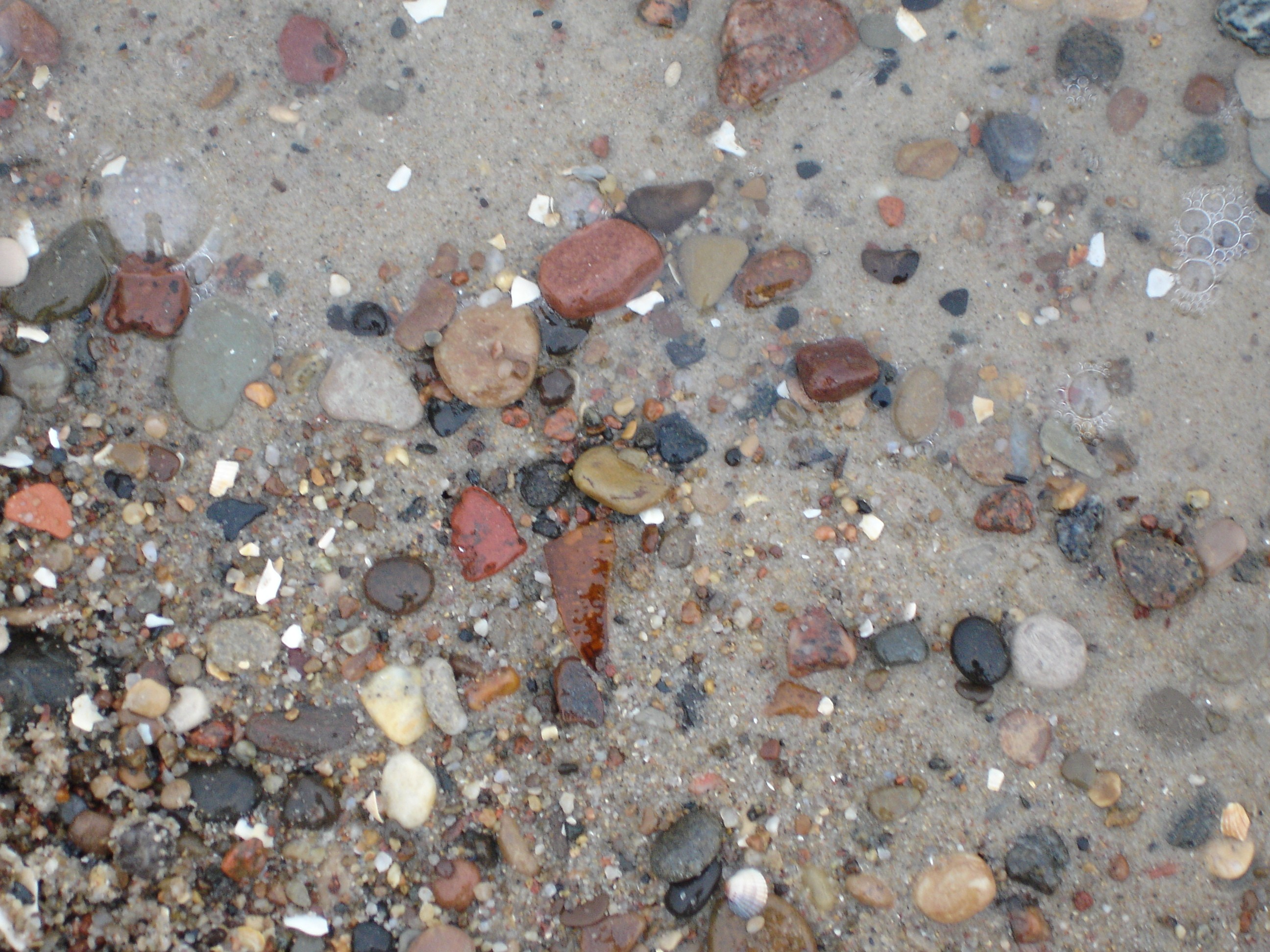
Typical beach sand on the Baltic Sea where amber is often washed up

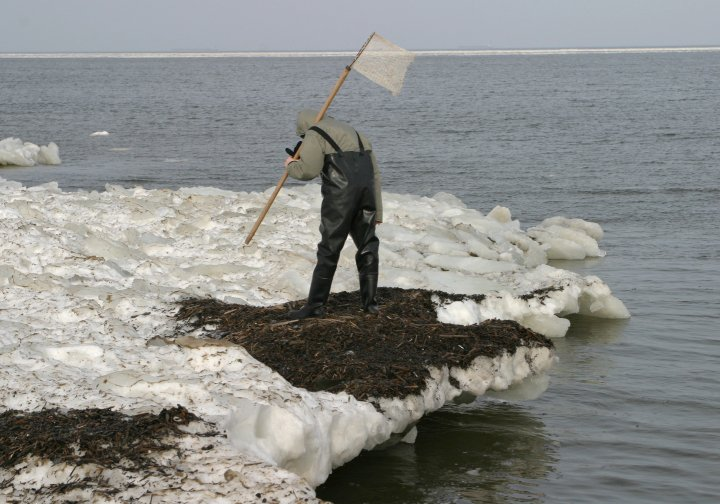
Fishing for amber at the seacoast, Mikoszewo, close to Gdańsk, Poland

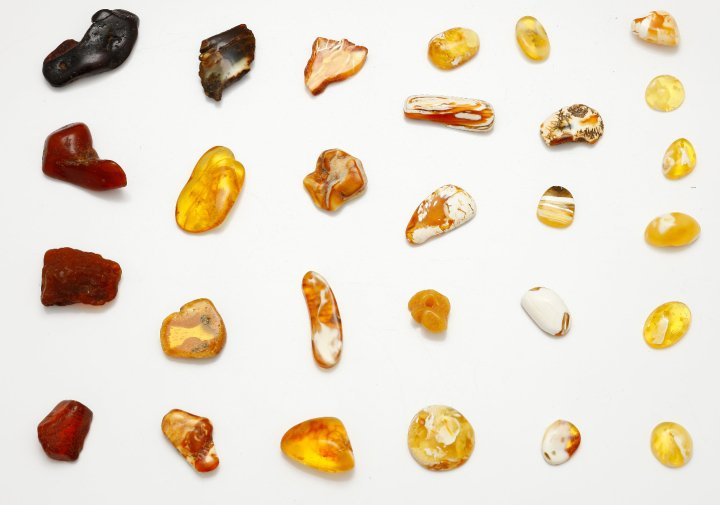
Different colours of Baltic amber

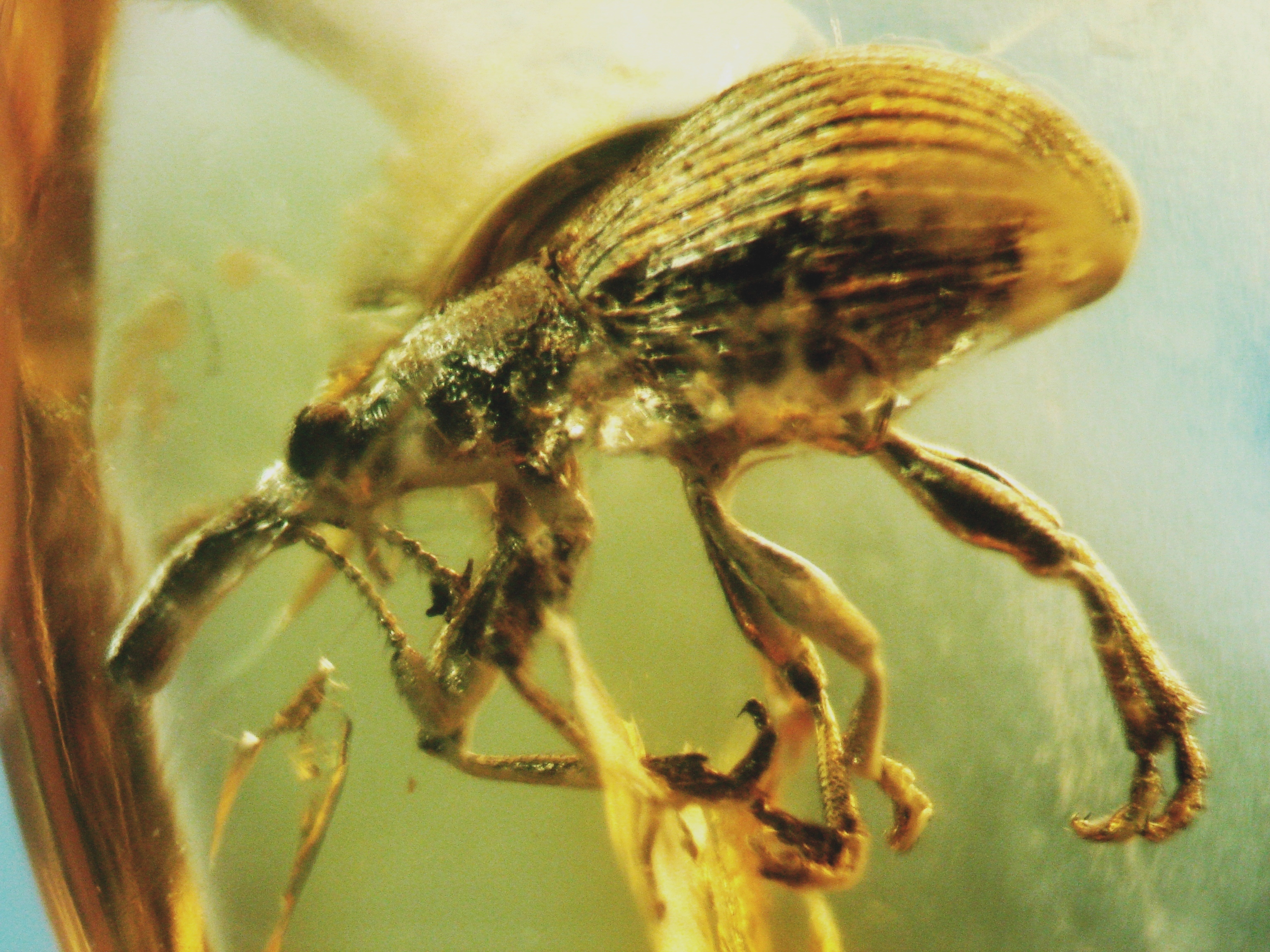
Fossil brentid beetle

== See also ==
- Amber Coast
- Dominican amber
- Japanese amber
- Rovno amber amber from Ukraine deposited at around the same time
- Bitterfeld amber amber from Germany deposited at around the same time
- Burmese amber

== Bibliography ==
- Matushevskaya, Aniela (2013). "Natural and artificial resins – chosen aspects of structure and properties" [Натуральные и искусственные смолы – некоторые аспекты структуры и свойств]. In Kostjashova, Z. V. (ed.). Янтарь и его имитации Материалы международной научно-практической конференции 27 июня 2013 года [Amber and its imitations] (in Russian). Kaliningrad: Kaliningrad Amber Museum, Ministry of Culture (Kaliningrad region, Russia). p. 113. ISBN 978-5-903920-26-6. Archived from the original on 2020-02-16.
