= Japanese amber =

Amber from Japan

Japanese amber is a type of soft fossilized resin, amber, that can be found in various regions of Japan.

The largest sources of this substance are located in Honshu. It is similar to Baltic amber and has similar general use. However, Japanese amber is softer and much more difficult to treat than the Baltic type. Its treatment requires special care and precision because stones can be easily damaged. Its color range varies from many shades of orange to brown. It is characterized by dark spots that can be found on its surface. The opacity of Japanese amber varies from clear to opaque pieces.

== Location ==
Sources of Japanese amber can be found in many different locations all over Japan. They have the whole area of 2800 km, starting from Hokkaido in the North and Kyūshū in the South. The only still opened mine is the Fuji mine where amber is recovered since the 6th century AD. In 1938 up to 13 tons of amber was recovered there. Two pieces recovered in the mine can be found as a part of a private collection (mass: 19kg, size 40x40x2 cm, recovered in 1927) and as a part of an exhibition in the National Museum of Nature and Science in Tokyo (mass: 16 kg, size 40x23x23 cm, recovered in 1941).

== Use ==
Due to its soft and easy to damage surface Japanese amber is not widely used. It can be found in jewellery as a decorative gemstone or to decorate clothes and utility items. A recovered decorative pillow from the 6th century decorated with Japanese amber was a part of an exhibition in Kaliningrad. Modern artists prefer to use Baltic amber, as it is easier to work with and has similar aesthetic values.
