= Metapelma compressipes =

Scientific classification
- Domain: Eukaryota
- Kingdom: Animalia
- Phylum: Arthropoda
- Class: Insecta
- Order: Hymenoptera
- Family: Metapelmatidae
- Genus: Metapelma
- Species: M. compressipes

Binomial name
- Metapelma compressipes (Cameron, 1909)

Species of wasp

Metapelma compressipes is a wasp in the family Metapelmatidae. The scientific name was first published in 1909 by Peter Cameron.
