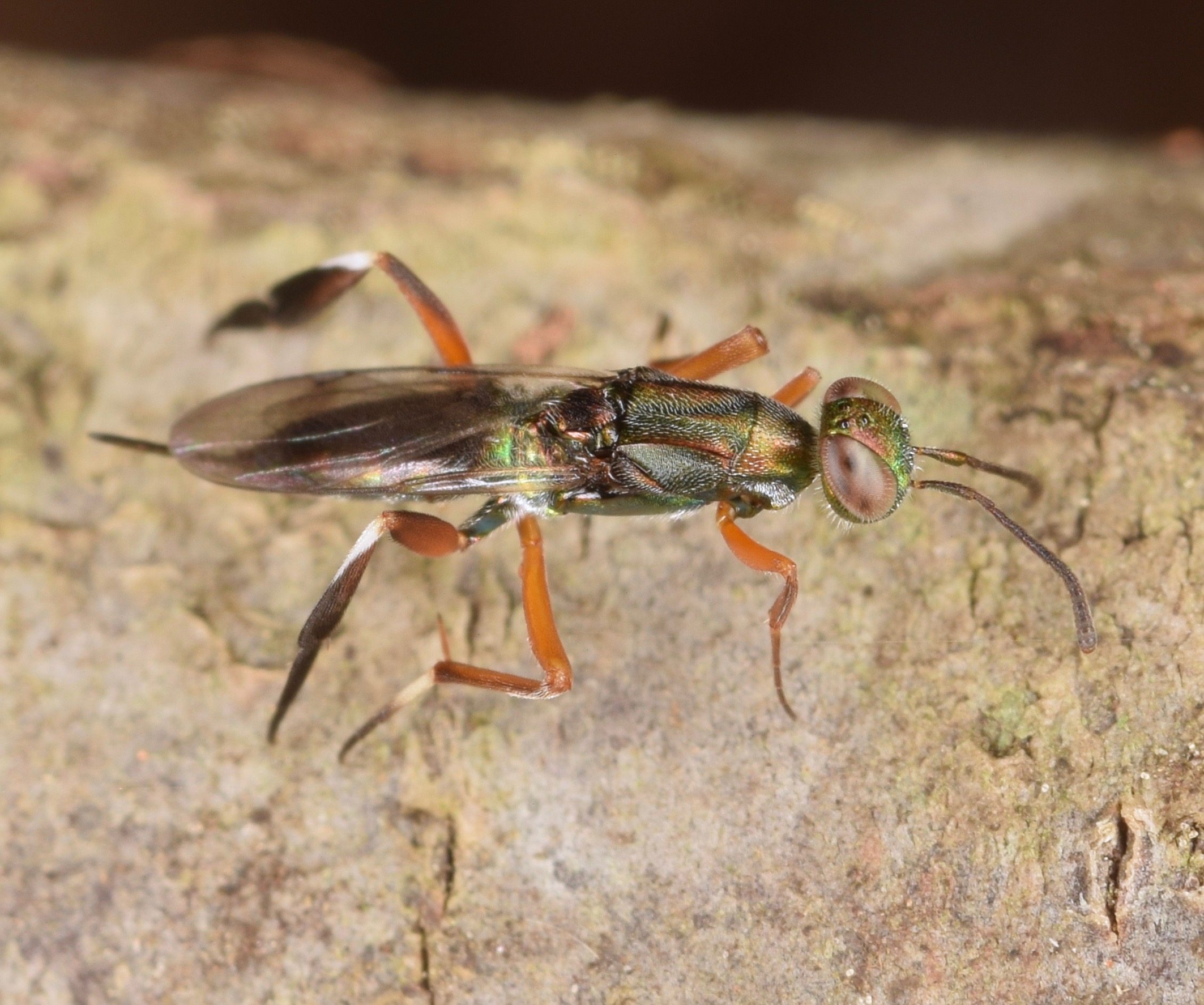
- Female Metapelma spectabile

Scientific classification
- Domain: Eukaryota
- Kingdom: Animalia
- Phylum: Arthropoda
- Class: Insecta
- Order: Hymenoptera
- Superfamily: Chalcidoidea
- Family: Metapelmatidae; Boucek, 1988
- Genus: Metapelma; Westwood, 1835

Species
- see text

= Metapelma =

Genus of wasps

Metapelma is a globally-distributed genus of parasitic wasps and the only genus in the family Metapelmatidae. They are parasitoids of longhorn-beetle larvae, which are wood-borers.

== Species ==
- Metapelma albisquamulata Enderlein, 1912
- Metapelma angustipes Ferrière, 1938
- †Metapelma archetypon Gibson, 2009
- Metapelma bachi Girault, 1922
- Metapelma beijingense Yang, 1996
- Metapelma berlandi Ferrière, 1938
- Metapelma compressipes Cameron, 1909
- Metapelma cubense Ashmead, 1900
- Metapelma elegantulum Ferrière, 1938
- Metapelma feae Masi, 1923
- Metapelma giraulti Ferrière, 1938
- Metapelma gloriosum Westwood, 1874
- Metapelma goethei Girault, 1928
- Metapelma insigne (Förster, 1860)
- Metapelma ledouxi Risbec, 1953
- Metapelma leucoptera Risbec, 1958
- Metapelma madecassa Ferrière, 1938
- Metapelma mesandamana Mani & Kaul, 1973
- Metapelma mirabile Brues, 1906
- Metapelma nobile (Förster, 1860)
- Metapelma obscuratum Westwood, 1874
- Metapelma pacificum Nikol'skaya, 1952
- Metapelma palauense Yoshimoto & Ishii, 1965
- Metapelma patrizii Masi, 1923
- Metapelma riparia Prinsloo, 1985
- Metapelma ruficauda Ferrière, 1938
- Metapelma rufimanum Westwood, 1874
- Metapelma salomonis Ferrière, 1938
- Metapelma schwarzi (Ashmead, 1890)
- Metapelma seyrigi Risbec, 1952
- Metapelma spectabile Westwood, 1835
- Metapelma strychnocola Mani & Kaul, 1973
- Metapelma sylvaticum Risbec, 1953
- Metapelma taprobanae Westwood, 1874
- Metapelma tenuicrus Gahan, 1925
- Metapelma turneri Ferrière, 1938
- Metapelma westwoodi Girault, 1915
- Metapelma zhangi Yang, 1996
