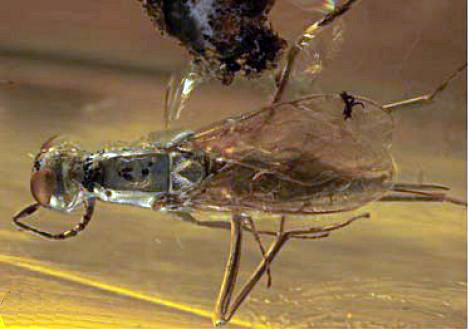

Scientific classification
- Kingdom: Animalia
- Phylum: Arthropoda
- Clade: Pancrustacea
- Class: Insecta
- Order: Hymenoptera
- Family: Eupelmidae
- Genus: †Brevivulva; Gibson, 2009
- Species: †B. electroma

Binomial name
- †Brevivulva electroma Gibson, 2009

= Brevivulva =

Brevivulva Temporal range: Early Eocene

Extinct genus of insects

Brevivulva is an extinct genus of parasitic wasp in the Eupelmidae subfamily Neanastatinae and contains the single species Brevivulva electroma. The genus is solely known from the Early Eocene Baltic amber deposits in the Baltic Sea region of Europe.

== History and classification ==
Brevivulva electroma is known only from one fossil, the holotype, number "AMNH BaJWJ-408", which is a single female specimen preserved near the end of a triangular amber block 21 by 5 millimetres (0.83 by 0.20 in) in size. The block is currently residing in the American Museum of Natural History paleoentomology collections in New York City. B. electroma was first studied by Gary A.P. Gibson, with his 2009 type description being published in the journal ZooKeys. The generic name combines the Latin words brevis, meaning "short", and vulva, meaning "cover" or "wrapper" and refers to the short length of the hypopygium in comparison to the modern genus Lambdobregma. The specific epithet "electroma" derives from the Latin electrum "amber".

== Description ==
Brevivulva electroma is 3.25 millimetres (0.128 in) in length when the ovipositor is included and is a uniform dark color with a faint metallic green cast to the mesosoma at certain angles. Several areas on the female are obscured, with the mouth, lower half of the face and underside of the gaster to the rear of the hypopygium having thin coatings of white mold. The forewings are uniformly hyaline in coloration and highly setose along the front edge of the wing margin in the costal cell. Beyond the parastigma the setae grow sparse and the wing apex is apparently bare.

The overall structure of and general appearance is very similar to that of living species in the genus Lambdobregma. This includes Brevivulva having a prepectus which is notably an elongate triangular shape and that narrows quickly towards the rear. However, a number of features set Brevivulva and Lambdobregma apart. Most distinctly Lambdobregma possesses a hypopygium which extends almost all the way to the tip of the gaster, whereas the hypopygium in Brevivulva extends only half the length of the gaster. Due to the stiff, exerted shape of the ovipositor sheath, Gibson postulated that Brevivulva electroma was parasitic on woodboring beetles or other hosts with similar habits of concealment.
