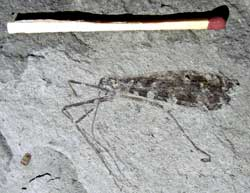
- Cimbrophlebia bittaciformis

Scientific classification
- Domain: Eukaryota
- Kingdom: Animalia
- Phylum: Arthropoda
- Class: Insecta
- Order: Mecoptera
- Family: †Cimbrophlebiidae; Willmann 1977

Genera
- See text

= Cimbrophlebiidae =

Cimbrophlebiidae Temporal range: Toarcian–Eocene

Extinct family of insects

Cimbrophlebiidae is an extinct family of scorpionflies. They are considered to be the sister group to the Bittacidae, together forming the clade Raptipedia.

== Systematics ==
- Bellicimbrophlebia Yang et al. 2013 Daohugou, China, Callovian
- Cimbrophlebia Willmann 1977 Jurassic-Eocene, Laurasia
- Juracimbrophlebia Wang et al. 2012 Daohugou, China, Callovian
- Malmocimbrophlebia Bechly and Schweigart 2000 Solnhofen, Germany, Tithonian
- Mirorcimbrophlebia Yang et al. 2013 Daohugou, China, Callovian
- Perfecticimbrophlebia Yang et al. 2012 Daohugou, China, Callovian
- Telobittacus Zhang 1993 Daohugou, China, Callovian Fengjiashan Formation, China, Hauterivian

An undescribed specimen is also known from the Toarcian aged "Green Series" of Germany.
