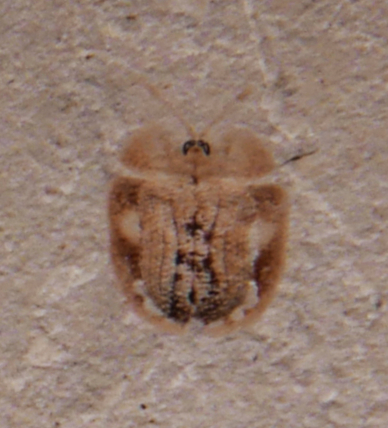
- holotype, counterpart, USNM PAL 582151 B

Scientific classification
- Domain: Eukaryota
- Kingdom: Animalia
- Phylum: Arthropoda
- Class: Insecta
- Order: Coleoptera
- Suborder: Polyphaga
- Infraorder: Cucujiformia
- Family: Chrysomelidae
- Subfamily: Cassidinae
- Tribe: Notosacanthini
- Genus: †Eosacantha; Chaboo & Engel, 2009
- Species: †E. delocranioides

Binomial name
- †Eosacantha delocranioides Chaboo & Engel, 2009

= Eosacantha =

Eosacantha Temporal range: Middle Eocene, 47 Ma

Extinct genus of beetles

Eosacantha is an extinct genus of tortoise beetle in the family Chrysomelidae and containing a single species Eosacantha delocranioides. The species is known only from the Middle Eocene Parachute Member, part of the Green River Formation, in the Piceance Creek Basin, Garfield County, northwestern Colorado, USA.

== History and classification ==
Eosacantha delocranioides is known only from one fossil, the holotype, specimen number "USNM 79136". The specimen is complete but of unidentified sex, preserved as a compression fossil in sedimentary rock. It was recovered from outcrops of the Green River Formation's Parachute Member, locality 41140, exposed in the Anvil Points area of Garfield County, Colorado, USA. The type specimen is currently preserved in the Department of Paleobiology collections housed in the National Museum of Natural History, located in Washington, D.C., USA. Eosacantha was first studied by Caroline S. Chaboo and Michael S. Engel of the University of Kansas, Lawrence, Kansas, USA. Their 2009 type description of the genus and species was published online and in print in the journal Systematic Entomology. The generic name was coined by Chaboo and Engel from a combination of the Greek ἠώς (eos) meaning "dawn" and the Greek word ἄκανθος (akanthos) meaning "thorny". The etymology of the specific epithet delocranioides is in reference to the general resemblance to some modern species in the genus Delocrania.

When described, Eosacantha delocranioides along with Denaeaspis chelonopsis were among the oldest derived tortoise beetles in the fossil record. The nearest modern relatives to Eosacantha in the tribe Notosacanthini are restricted to African, tropical Asian, and Australian regions. The loss of the tribe from North America may be related to specialization of the beetles to specific plant hosts that were lost due to the extensive climatic shifts during the Late Eocene – Early Oligocene transition.

== Description ==
The E. delocranioides type specimen is a well-preserved complete adult preserved in a dorsal view showing the antennae and head in full view. The front edge of the pronotum is deeply indented with the head and antennae visible. The elytra are preserved with a clear yellowish coloration with a darkening of the elytra towards the marginal disk. The type specimen is small: 3.12 millimeters (0.123 in) wide by 3.2 mm (0.13 in) long. The antennae, composed of 11 segments, are notably short in length and have an overall clavate morphology. Antennomeres seven through eleven form a weak club at the tip of the antenna.
