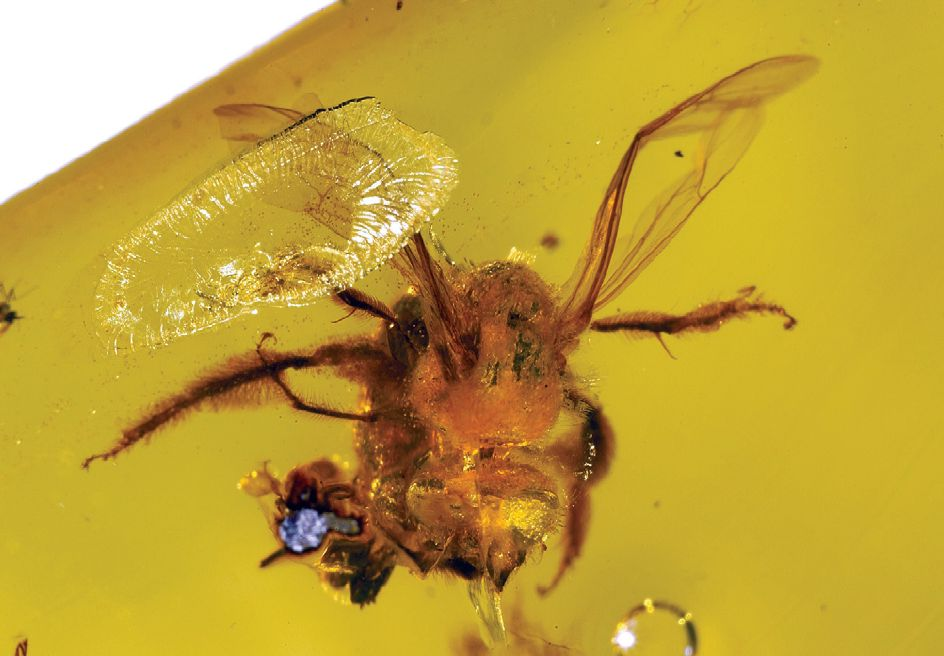
- Nesagapostemon moronei holotype

Scientific classification
- Kingdom: Animalia
- Phylum: Arthropoda
- Clade: Pancrustacea
- Class: Insecta
- Order: Hymenoptera
- Family: Halictidae
- Genus: †Nesagapostemon
- Species: †N. moronei

Binomial name
- †Nesagapostemon moronei Engel, 2009

= Nesagapostemon =

Nesagapostemon Temporal range: Burdigalian

Extinct genus of bees

Nesagapostemon is an extinct monotypic genus of sweat bee in the Halictidae subfamily Halictinae. At present, it contains the single species Nesagapostemon moronei.

The genus name Nesagapostemon is derived from a combination of the Greek nesos, meaning "island", and Agapostemon, a very similar genus of halictids which may be related. The species is named in honor of Ettore Morone of Turin, Italy. The species is known from the holotype, a single 9.9 millimetres (0.39 in) long female currently in the private collection owned by Morone (catalog number MACT-1172), and which was first studied by Dr. Michael S. Engel. Engel published his type description in ZooKeys in 2009.

The holotype is fairly well preserved in early Miocene (Burdigalian stage) Dominican amber from deposits on the island of Hispaniola. However the animal has several fractures around the metasoma. In addition, a number of small bubbles and orange debris in the amber surround the body and three Proplebeia dominicana workers, also trapped in the amber, obscure portions of the body. The forewings of the Nesagapostemon female are 9.9 millimetres (0.39 in) and held at an angle to line of the thorax. Though hard to determine because of the preservation, where visible, the specimen has a metallic coloration to the head and thorax. The antenna are dark brown while the tegula is translucent brown and the metasomal tegra are dark brown with weak metallic green highlights. The legs are dark reddish brown and the wings are hyaline with brown veins.

Nesagapostemon is one of only five Halictidae genera which are known from the Dominican amber record, three of which are totally extinct. Nesagapostemon has a strong keel or carina encircling the Propodeum. The basal area of the Propodeum, not slanting in profile, is only half of the length of the vertical posterior surface. The related extinct halictid genus Eickwortapis has a longer basal area on the Propodeum and it does slant in profile. The middle legs have a dense covering of hairs, those on the inner surface being long enough to cover the metatibial spurs and those on the outside being long and plumose. Unlike Eickwortapis the inner metatibial spur on Nesagapostemon is hooked and the inner border of the "C" vein is double the length of the pterostigma.
