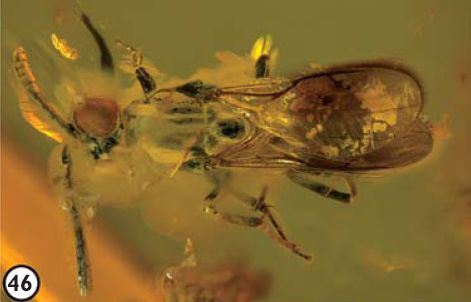

Scientific classification
- Kingdom: Animalia
- Phylum: Arthropoda
- Clade: Pancrustacea
- Class: Insecta
- Order: Hymenoptera
- Family: Eupelmidae
- Genus: †Aspidopleura; Gibson, 2009
- Species: †A. baltica

Binomial name
- †Aspidopleura baltica Gibson, 2009

= Aspidopleura =

Aspidopleura Temporal range: Early Eocene

Extinct genus of insects

Aspidopleura is an extinct monotypic genus of parasitic wasp in the Eupelmidae subfamily Neanastatinae and at present, it contains the single species Aspidopleura baltica. The genus is solely known from the Early Eocene Baltic amber deposits in the Baltic Sea region of Europe.

== History and classification ==
Aspidopleura is known from only two fossils, the holotype and the paratype. The holotype, number "AMNH-JWJ-409", is a single female specimen preserved in a nearly flattened amber block 24 by 18 millimetres (0.94 by 0.71 in) in size. The paratype, number "AMNH-JWJ-410", is also a single female specimen and preserved in a nearly triangular amber block 19 by 14 millimetres (0.75 by 0.55 in) in size. Both amber blocks are currently residing in the American Museum of Natural History paleoentomology collections in New York City, USA. The specimens of Aspidopleura baltica were first studied by Gary A.P. Gibson, with his 2009 type description being published in the journal ZooKeys. The generic name wash coined by Gary Gibson as a combination of the Greek words aspido meaning "shield" and pleuro, meaning "side", in reference to the shape and overall structure of the acropleuron. The specific epithet "baltica" was designated as a reference to the origin of the specimens in amber from the Baltic region.

== Description ==
Aspidopleura baltica is 4.2 millimetres (0.17 in) in length when the ovipositor is included and a uniform dark brown color. Several areas on each of the females are obscured or missing, with the dorsal view and right side not visible on the holotype, while the paratype has areas of white mold. The forewings are hyaline in coloration with a large brown spot covering the area behind the marginal and postmarginal veins but fading towards the wing apex.

In general Aspidopleura does not closely resemble extant members of the subfamily Neanastatinae, with a very large speculum in the forewing and possessing a distinct frenum. These features are closer in appearance to females of the subfamily Eupelminae. However the sine patterning on the legs of Aspidopleura are much closer to that of extant Neanastatinae.

Although the life habit of Aspidopleura baltica is unknown, the short length of the ovipositor and shape of the mandibles, both similar to the genus Anastatus in subfamily Eupelminae, suggests Aspidopleura was possibly parasitic on insect eggs.
