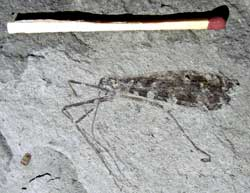
- Cimbrophlebia bittaciformis from the Fur Formation

Scientific classification
- Domain: Eukaryota
- Kingdom: Animalia
- Phylum: Arthropoda
- Class: Insecta
- Order: Mecoptera
- Family: †Cimbrophlebiidae
- Genus: †Cimbrophlebia; Willmann, 1977

= Cimbrophlebia =

Cimbrophlebia Temporal range: Callovian–Early Eocene

Extinct genus of insects

Cimbrophlebia is an extinct genus of Mecoptera which existed from the Jurassic to the Eocene period.

== Species ==
The genus Cimbrophlebia contains the species:

- Cimbrophlebia amoena Daohugou, China, Callovian
- Cimbrophlebia bittaciformis Fur Formation, Denmark, Eocene
- Cimbrophlebia brooksi Klondike Mountain Formation, Washington, Eocene
- Cimbrophlebia flabelliformis Kamloops Group, Canada, Ypresian
- Cimbrophlebia leahyi Kamloops Group, Canada, Ypresian
- Cimbrophlebia rara Yixian Formation, China, Aptian
- Cimbrophlebia westae Klondike Mountain Formation, Washington, Eocene
