= Badge of Honour "For Success in Labour" =

Badge of Honour "For Success at Labour"
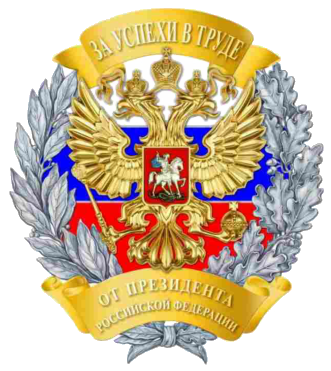
- Order of Honour
- Type: Single grade order
- Presented by: the Russian Federation
- Eligibility: Citizens of Russia
- Status: Active
- Established: 24 August 2021
- First award: 13 September 2021
- Final award: 1 May 2024

Highlights
- Total: 28
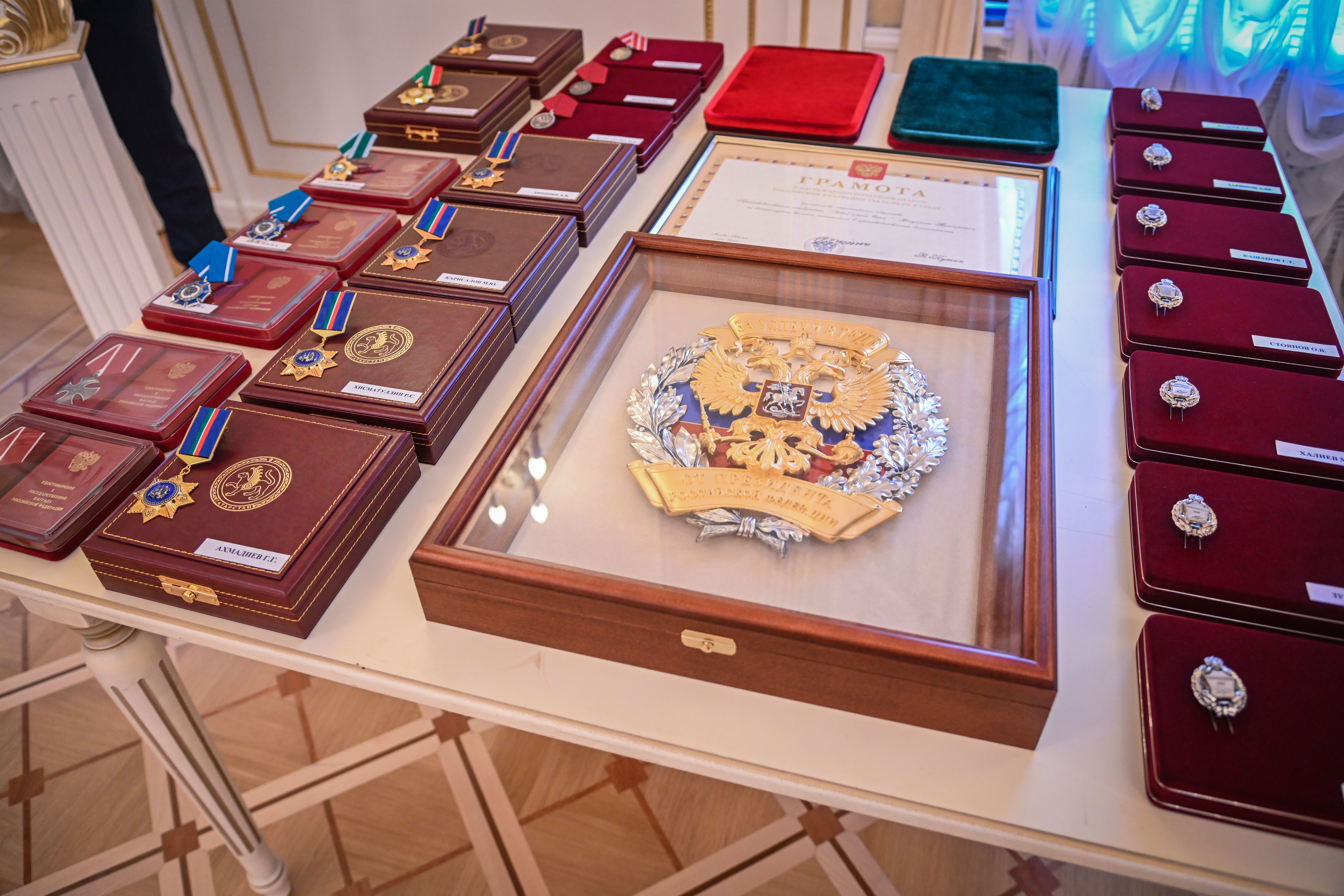

Badge of Honour "For Success in Labour" (Russian: Почётный знак Российской Федерации «За успехи в труде») is a state award of the Russian Federation, established by Decree of the President of the Russian Federation dated August 24, 2021 No. 490 “On the establishment of the honorary badge of the Russian Federation “For Success in Labour”.

== History ==
In the Soviet Union, there was an honorary badge of the Central Committee of the Komsomol with the same name. It was awarded to students (mainly senior classes) of secondary schools, as well as students of the first, second, third years of secondary vocational schools for achieving high results in socially useful productive work and active participation in the life of student groups. The award was established in 1986 and was awarded until 1991.

== Regulation and criteria ==
Recommendations for awarding the honorary badge of the Russian Federation “For success in labor” are submitted to the President of the Russia by the heads of federal government bodies or senior officials (heads of the highest executive bodies of state power) of the constituent entities of the Russian Federation. Nominations for awarding a badge of honor must include information about the production, scientific or other achievements of the teams.

A decree of the President of Russia is issued on awarding the badge of honor, as a rule, once a year, on the eve of the Spring and Labor Day. At the same time, no more than five teams are awarded this honorary badge annually. In exceptional cases, by decision of the President ofRussia, it is allowed to award an honorary badge without complying with these requirements. The honorary badge will not be awarded again. Along with the badge of honour, the team is awarded a certificate.

Awarding the honorary badge of the Russian Federation “For Success in Labour” is a form of encouragement to teams of enterprises, organizations and institutions, regardless of the form of ownership, for high achievements in the field of industrial and agricultural production, economics, science, culture, art, education, healthcare, education, physical culture and sports and for other services to the state over the last five years preceding the date of submission of the award proposal.

== Description ==
The badge of honor has the shape of a wreath of laurel and oak branches of silver color. The ends of the branches crossing at the bottom in the center are tied with a silver ribbon. In the center of the wreath, against the background of the colors of the State Flag of the Russian Federation, made with hot enamel, is an image of the State Emblem of the Russian Federation. Above the State Emblem of the Russian Federation is a golden ribbon with the inscription: “FOR SUCCESS IN LABOR.” At the bottom of the wreath, under the State Emblem of the Russian Federation, there is a golden-colored ribbon with the inscription: “FROM THE PRESIDENT OF THE RUSSIAN FEDERATION”. All inscriptions on the ribbons are in relief

The badge has a height of 275 mm and width of 250 mm. It is made of jewelry brass with silvering, gilding and hot enamel coating. On the reverse side of the badge of honor its serial number is indicated. The badge is placed in a red case made of valuable wood with a transparent top cover.
