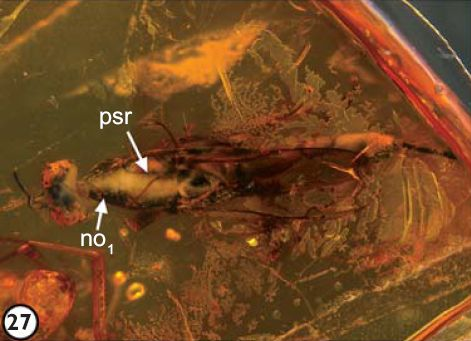

Scientific classification
- Kingdom: Animalia
- Phylum: Arthropoda
- Clade: Pancrustacea
- Class: Insecta
- Order: Hymenoptera
- Family: Metapelmatidae
- Genus: Metapelma
- Species: †M. archetypon

Binomial name
- †Metapelma archetypon Gibson, 2009

= Metapelma archetypon =

Metapelma archetypon Temporal range: Early Eocene

Extinct species of wasp

Metapelma archetypon is an extinct species of parasitic wasp in the family Metapelmatidae. The species is solely known from the Early Eocene Baltic amber deposits in the Baltic Sea region of Europe. Of the thirty-seven described species in the genus Metapelma, M. archetypon is the only species known from the fossil record.

== History and classification ==
Metapelma archetypon is known only from one fossil, the holotype, number "AMNH BaJWJ-407", which is a single female specimen preserved, along with a spider, in a nearly rectangular amber block 13 by 11 millimetres (0.51 by 0.43 in) in size. The block is currently residing in the American Museum of Natural History paleoentomology collections in New York City, USA. M. archetypon was first studied by Gary A. P. Gibson with his 2009 type description being published in the journal ZooKeys. The specific epithet "archetypon" was designated by Gary Gibson from the Greek ἀρχέτυπον (archetypon) which translates as "original" or "model". This is in reference to the similarity of the head and hind leg structure similarity between the extinct and extant species.

== Description ==
The holotype of Metapelma archetypon is 7.7 millimetres (0.30 in) in length when the ovipositor is excluded. Several areas of the female are obscured or missing, with the dorsal mesosomal and part of the gastral structures covered by a white substance. The terminal sections of both antenna and three of the legs are missing and both hind tarsi have the apical three segments detached but still present. Also missing is the terminal section of the ovipositor sheaths. The forewings are hyaline in coloration. While M. archetypon has a deeply divided upper and lower mesepimeron separating the acropleuron and metapleuron, a feature found only in Metapelma, the shapes of the hind legs and head are closer to the general morphology of the subfamily Neanastatinae. The basal Neanastatinae groundplan is thought to have been modified in the modern genera in the subfamily. Although not confirmed shape of the ovipositor and relationship in the genus Metapelma suggests M. archetypon was parasitic on wood-boring beetles.
