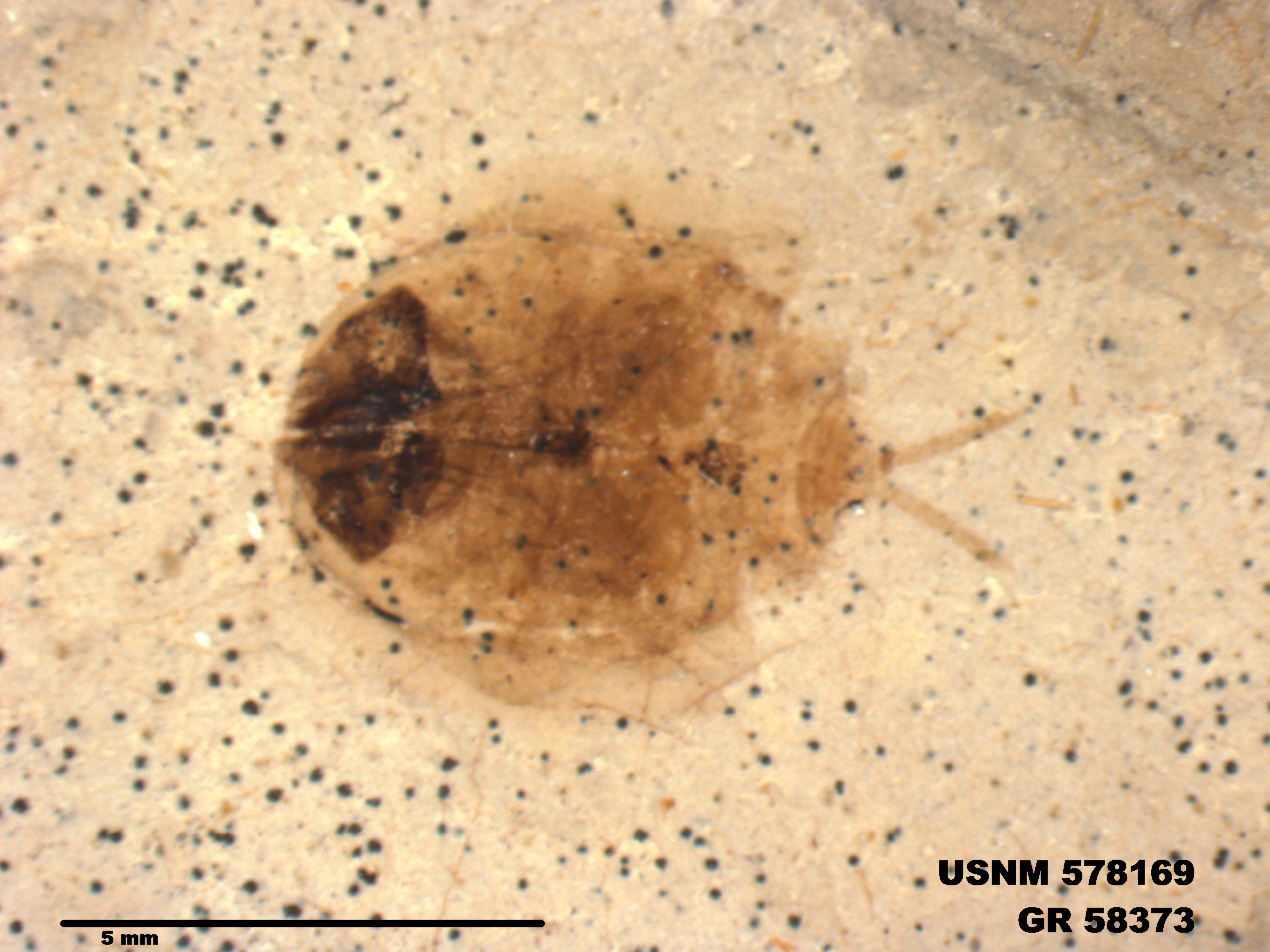
- holotype USNM PAL 5781569

Scientific classification
- Domain: Eukaryota
- Kingdom: Animalia
- Phylum: Arthropoda
- Class: Insecta
- Order: Coleoptera
- Suborder: Polyphaga
- Infraorder: Cucujiformia
- Family: Chrysomelidae
- Subfamily: Cassidinae
- Tribe: Imatidiini
- Genus: †Denaeaspis
- Species: †D. chelonopsis

Binomial name
- †Denaeaspis chelonopsis Chaboo & Engel, 2009

= Denaeaspis =

Denaeaspis Temporal range: Lutetian, 47 Ma

Extinct genus of beetles

Denaeaspis is an extinct genus of tortoise beetle in the family Chrysomelidae and containing a single species Denaeaspis chelonopsis. The species is known only from the Middle Eocene Parachute Member, part of the Green River Formation, in the Piceance Creek Basin, Garfield County, northwestern Colorado, USA.

== History and classification ==
Denaeaspis chelonopsis is known only from one fossil, the holotype, specimen number "USNM 58373". The specimen is composed of a complete specimen of unidentified sex which is preserved as a compression fossil in sedimentary rock. The fossil was recovered from outcrops of the Green River Formations Parachute Member at the Denson site, locality 42053, in Garfield County, Colorado, USA. The type specimen is currently preserved in the Department of Paleobiology collections housed in the National Museum of Natural History, located in Washington, D.C., USA. Denaeaspis was first studied by Caroline S. Chaboo and Michael S. Engel of the University of Kansas, Lawrence, Kansas, USA. Their 2009 type description of the genus and species was published online and in print in the journal Systematic Entomology. The generic name was coined by Chaboo and Engel from a combination of the Greek denaios meaning "old" and the Greek word aspis meaning "shield". The etymology of the specific epithet chelonopsis, from the Greek chelone for "tortoise" and opsis for "lookalike", is in reference to tortoise beetles, the common name of the group.

When described, Denaeaspis chelonopsis along with Eosacantha delocranioides were among the oldest derived tortoise beetles in the fossil record. The nearest modern relatives to Eosacantha in the tribe Imatidiini are restricted to South America and the Caribbean region. The loss of the tribe from North America may be related specialization of the beetles to specific plant hosts that were lost with due to the extensive climatic shifts during the Late Eocene - Early Oligocene transition.

== Description ==
The D. chelonopsis type specimen is a well-preserved complete adult showing the full antennae and head within a dorsal view. The pronotum is much wider than its length and possesses sparse, shallow punctures that are separated by the width of a single puncture. The elytra are preserved without coloration but the hind-wings are faintly visible through the elytra, with a distinct darkening toward the tips of the wings. The sides of each elytron have an expanded margin extending from the body by 1.5 the width of the elytron and have a notable pocket on the interior side of the margin. The type specimen is 5.04 millimetres (0.198 in) wide by 6.04 millimetres (0.238 in) long. The antennae are composed of 11 segments, are short in length and have an overall filiform morphology. The antennomeres are uniform in shape, being slightly longer than they are wide.
