= Kaliningrad Regional Amber Museum =

Museum in Kaliningrad, Russia

Coordinates: 54°43′21″N 20°31′24″E

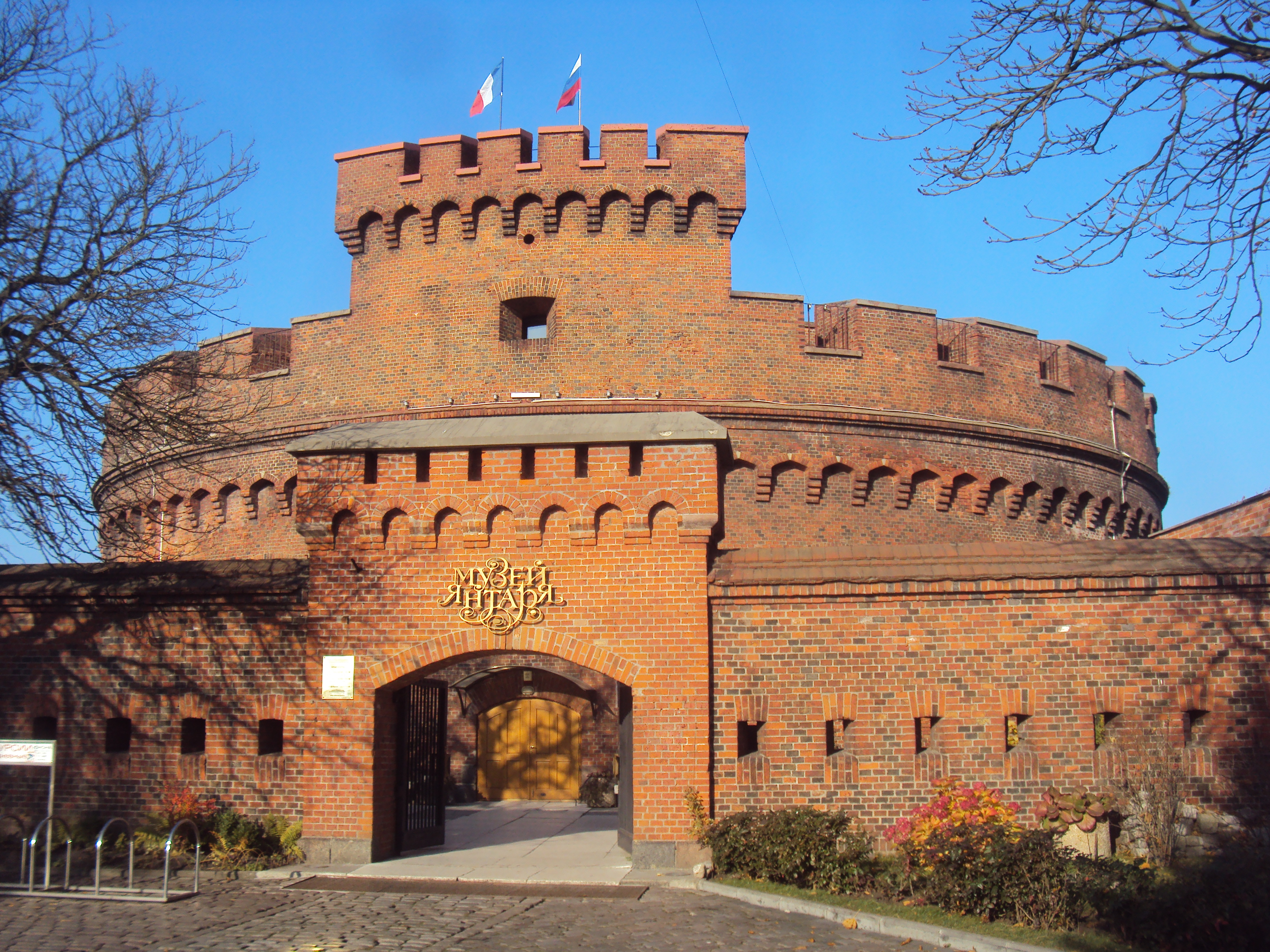
- Established: 1979
- Location: Kaliningrad, Russia
- Visitors: 141,500 (2011)
- Director: Tatyana Suvorova
- Website: www.ambermuseum.ru/en/main

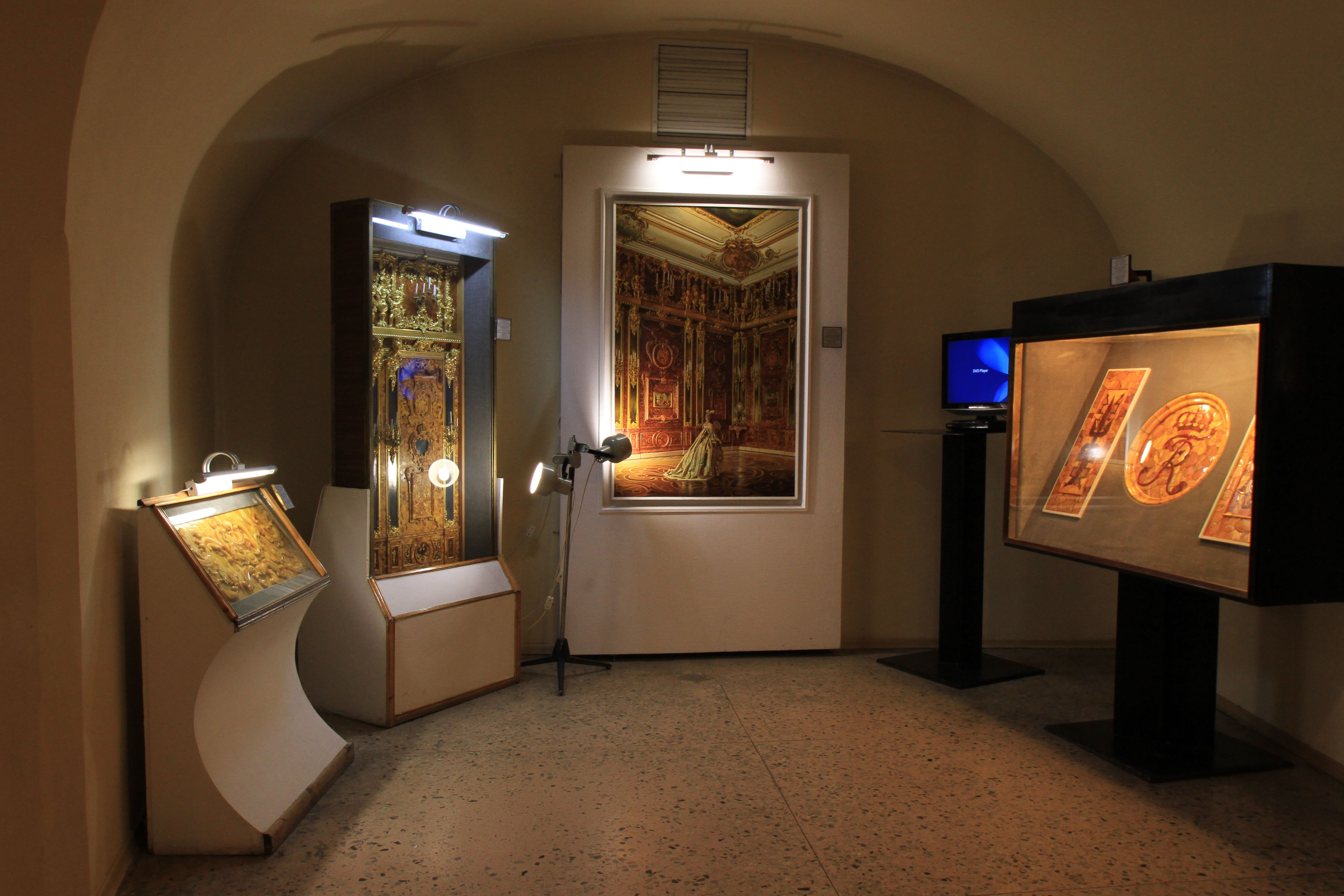
Exposition on the subject of Amberroom

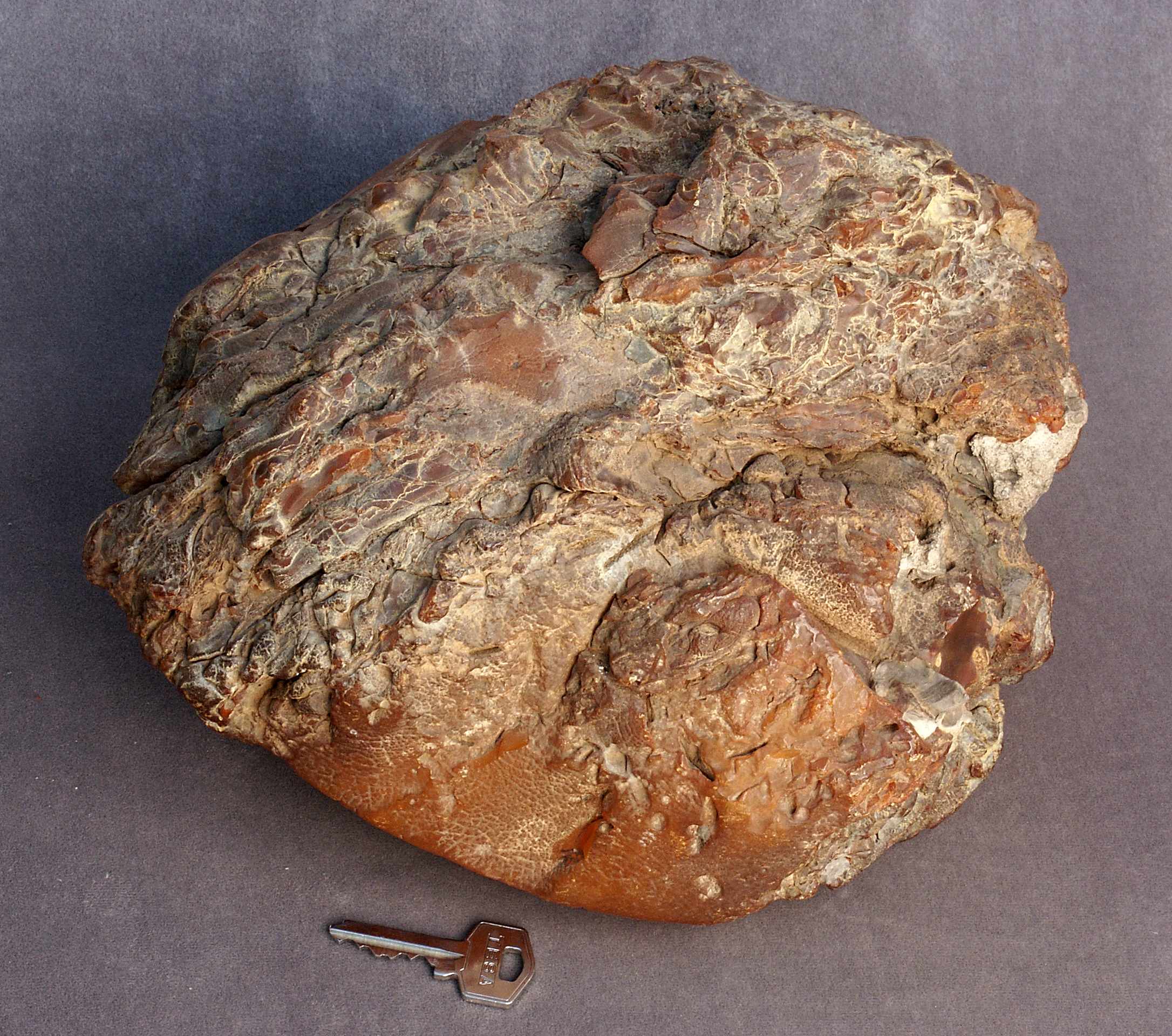
The largest piece of amber in Russia, weighing 4.28 kilograms (9.4 lb)

The Kaliningrad Regional Amber Museum is a museum located in the Russian city of Kaliningrad devoted to housing and displaying amber artworks. It is located in the city center, on the shore of Lake Verkhneye. Construction on the museum began in 1972.

The museum opened in 1979 and houses about 14,000 individual pieces. The museum occupies part of a reconstructed fortification, originally built by Karl Friedrich Emil zu Dohna-Schlobitten in the Napoleonic Wars.

Among the exhibits are the world's second-largest piece of amber and a 1.2-metre-tall (4 ft) vase named The Abundance, as well as a collection of over 3,000 amber inclusions. One of the most famous organic inclusions is a small lizard.

== History ==
The amber museum was established in Kaliningrad because the largest (discovered) deposit of the Baltic gem – more than 90% of the world's reserves, is near the town of Yantarnoye.

For ten years since 1969 the process of restoration of the historical and architectural complex was under way. The first stage of the Amber Museum was opened on 29 December 1979, as a branch of the Kaliningrad Regional Historical and Art Museum.

== Galleries ==
The exposition is arranged on three floors in 28 show-rooms, with a total area of 1,000 square metres (11,000 sq ft). It contains five sections:

- Origin of amber, its properties
- Historical and archaeological knowledge of amber
- Amber in art of the 17th to 18th centuries
- Kaliningrad Amber Factory
- Amber in contemporary art

A part of the exhibition is dedicated the Staatliche Bernstein-Manufaktur Königsberg (lit. 'government amber factory Königsberg'), a German company for extraction and treatment of amber in Kaliningrad (Königsberg) and Jantarny (Palmnicken) until 1945.

The museum has unique pieces of the Baltic gem (a 4-kilogram (8.8 lb) 280-gram (9.9 oz) sampler, the largest in the museum's collection), as well as more than two thousand pieces of art from it.

The museum is the only owner of fragments of the decor of the Amber Room, restored by artists G. Khozatsky, V. Ertsev, V. Vorobyov, A. Zhuravlev, A. Vanin, M. Ertseva and L. Grigorieva. The artists managed to revive the technology of processing amber, which was used by masters of the 17th-18th centuries

In the museum there are dioramas of the ancient "amber forest" and a career in the extraction of the amber "blue earth", many pieces (more than a thousand) of amber with inclusions of Mesozoic plants and animals, including lizards. The whole spectrum of amber colors is shown from white to black. Amber products of the 4th-5th centuries AD, also found by archaeologists on the territory of the Kaliningrad region, were exhibited, as well as works by German masters handed over from the Armory Chamber.

== Exhibitions ==
In 2004, an exhibition of a foreign artist-jeweller, designer Lisa Vershbow from the US, was organized, which demonstrated new approaches to the artistic interpretation of amber. The American jeweler held master classes with young Kaliningrad artists.

In 2005, the 750th anniversary of Kaliningrad, the Amber Museum exhibited masterpieces of the processing of amber from the 16th and 18th centuries from the collection of the Tsarskoye Selo State Museum-Reserve, from the famous Amber Room. This exhibition marked the beginning of the project "Amber Collections of Russia and Europe in the Kaliningrad Amber Museum". Other thematic exhibitions were held: "Baltic amber in the State Hermitage collection" (2007) in St. Petersburg, "Union of Earth and Water" (2008) from the collection of the Moscow Kremlin Museums (Armory) in Moscow and others. In 2005 the museum visited the exhibition "Japanese Amber" and the exhibition "Conquerors of the Earth" from the Paleontological Institute of the Russian Academy of Sciences, dedicated to insects that inhabited the planet 650–50 million years ago.

== Foreign cooperation ==
Among the partner countries are Latvia, Lithuania, Poland, Germany, Sweden, Denmark, Japan, United States, Italy, Austria, France. In 2007–2008, the Amber Museum with the Amber Coast of Russia exhibition took part in the presentation of the Kaliningrad region in the framework of the 9th Russian Art Festival in Cannes, France. Then the exhibition visited Germany, Latvia, Lithuania and Poland.

One of the most important Museum activities is organization and holding of the International Biennial of Amber Art Works Alatyr (an Old Russian name of amber) since 2004, since 2012 – the All-Russian Jewelry Art Exhibition.

From 2 to 5 November 2017, the International Cultural Heritage Fair was held at the Louvre in Paris, where the Kaliningrad Amber Museum presented works by its artisans.

== Visitors ==
Revenues from the main activities of the museum in 2005 amounted to 2.8 million rubles, equivalent to 11 million rubles in 2023, and in 2008 to 7.5 million rubles, equivalent to 21.3 million rubles in 2023. The number of excursions in 2003 totalled 292, and in 2008 more than 1000. The number of exhibitions in 2008 was more than 20. In total for the period of 2004–2008 about 100 exhibitions were held, the collection of the museum was replenished with 10,000 items of storage, including antiquarian objects, works of foreign artists and unique inclusions.

In 2013 about 160,000 guests visited the museum. Every year 1,200 excursions are given and about 30 exhibitions are organized.

== Publishing ==
The museum is very active in publishing. 26 books have been published between 2006 and 2014, mostly in Russian and English.

== Gallery of Rare Items ==
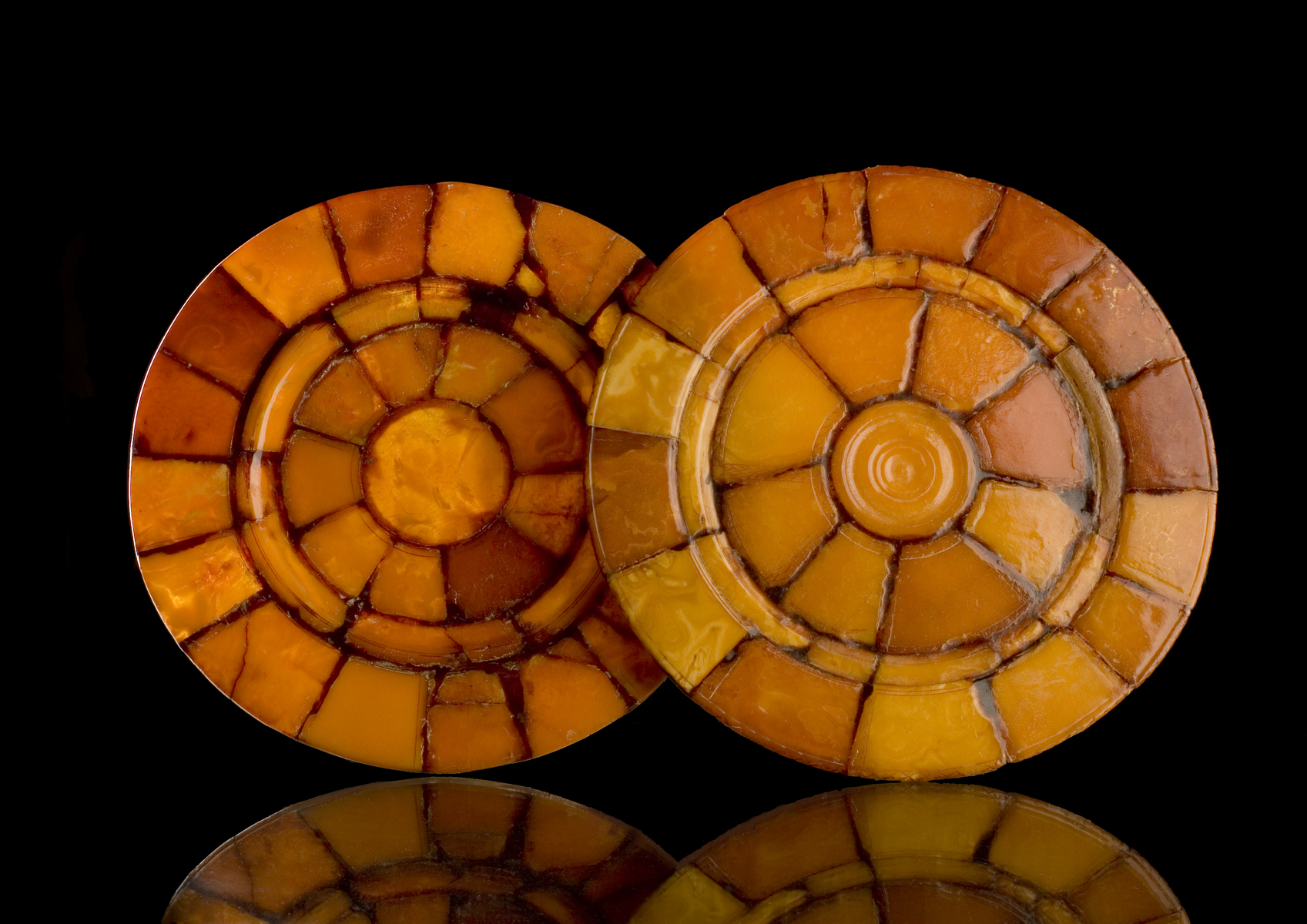
Decorative plates. 17th century. Germany. Restoration: 1980.

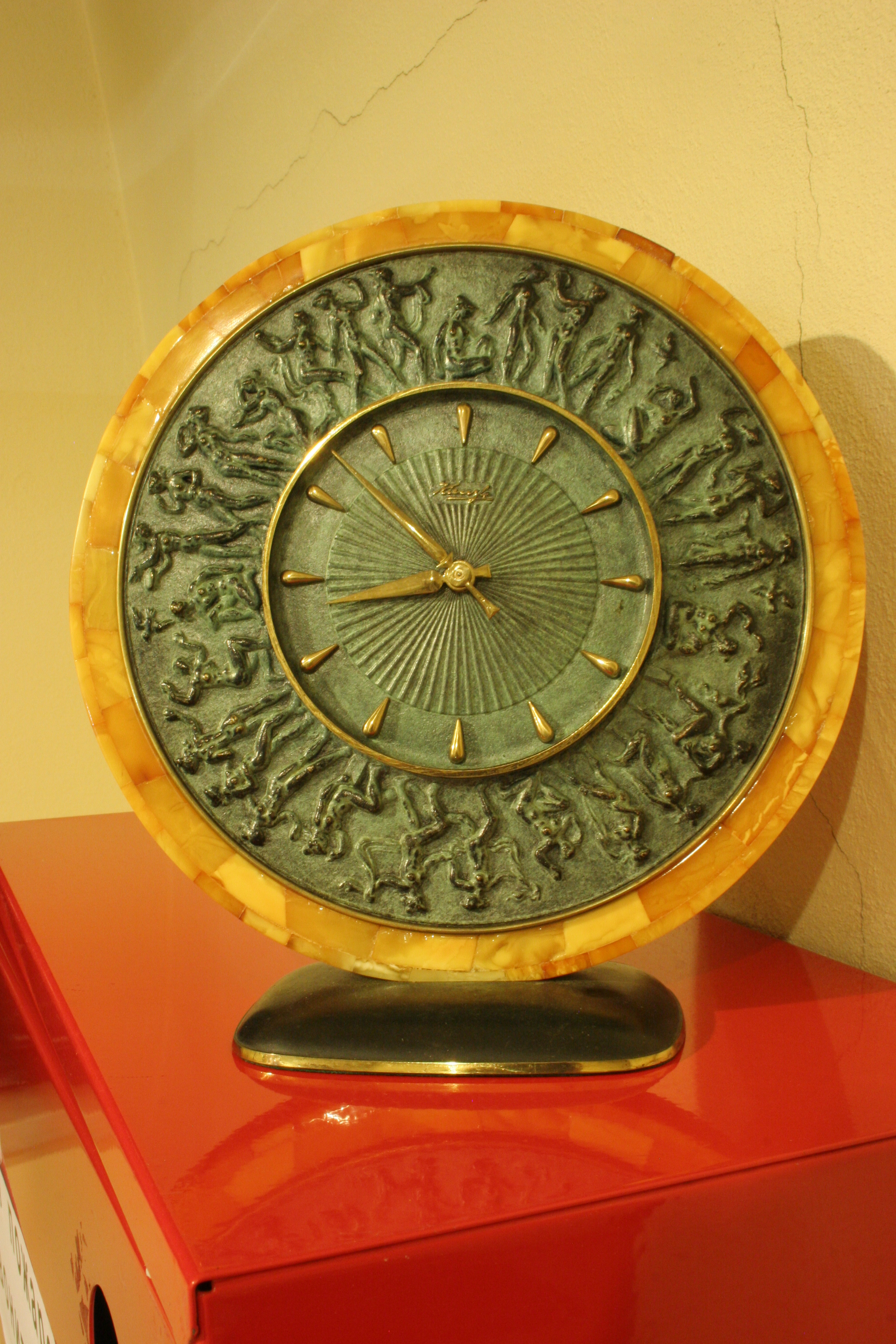
Desktop clock. 1920s-1940s. Koenigsberg State Amber Manufactory.

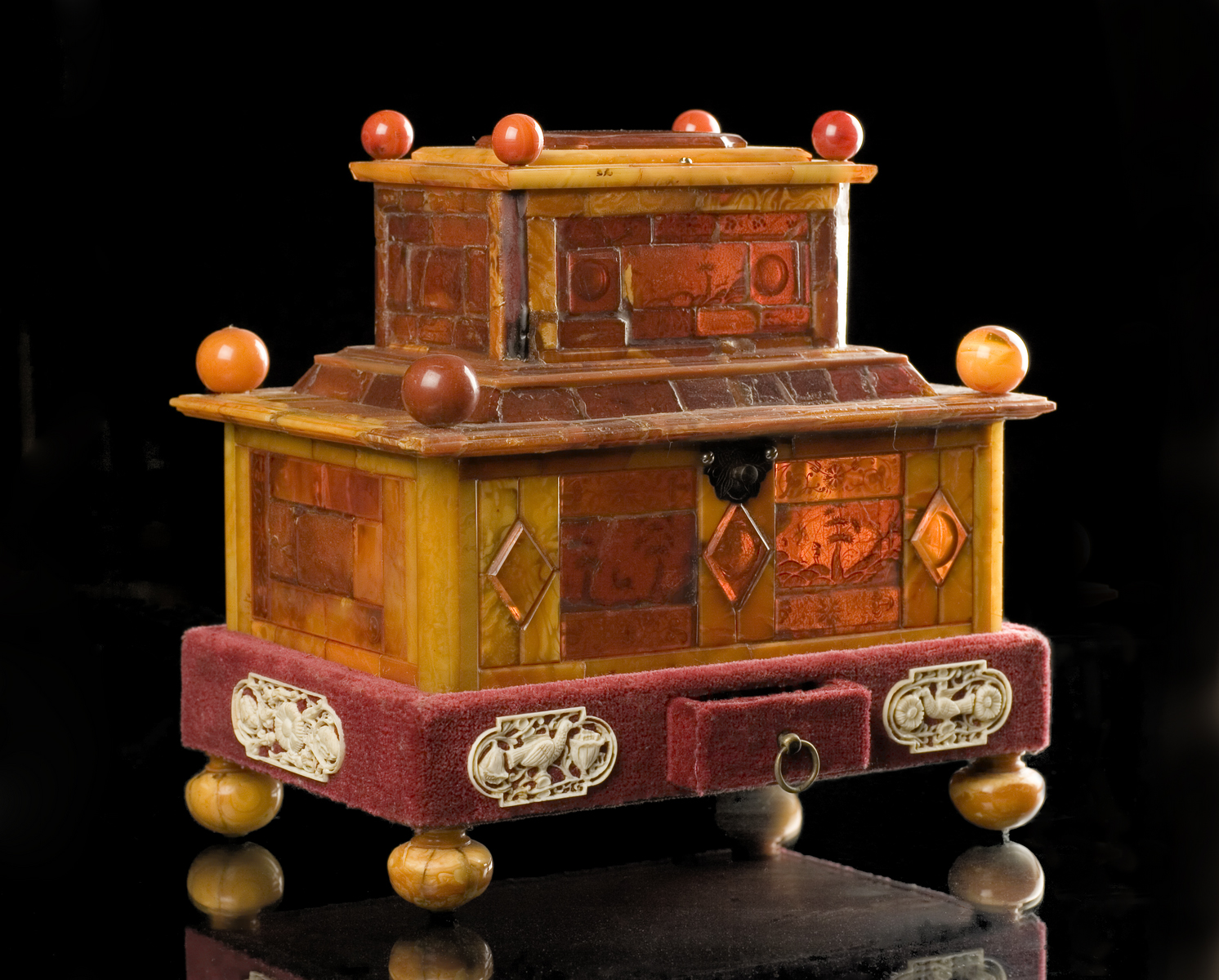
The box is two-tiered. 17th century. Germany. Restoration: 1990.

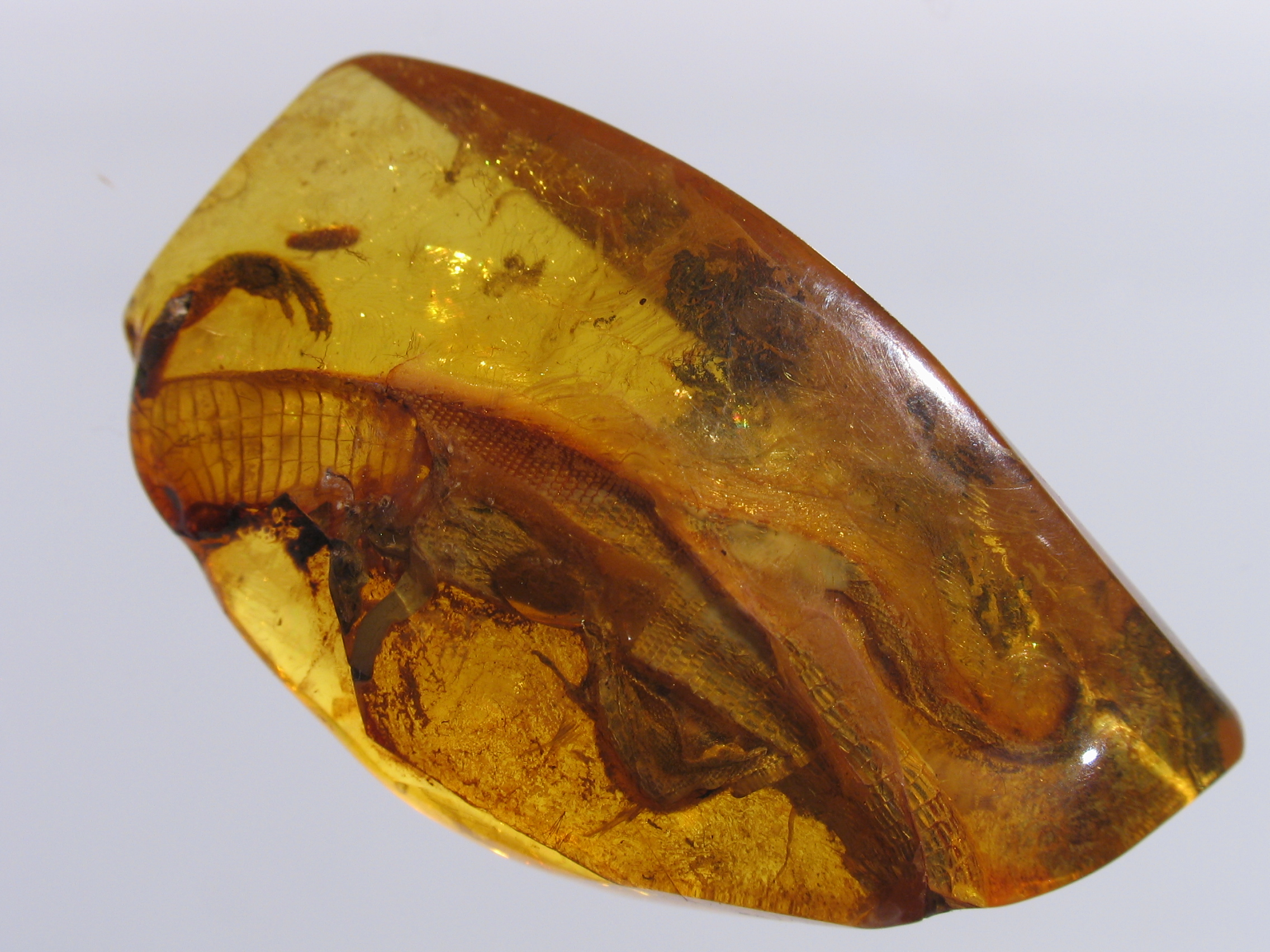
Inclusion. Lizard. 50 million years (Reptilia, Lacertidae)
