= List of Halonoproctidae species =

This page lists all described species of the spider family Halonoproctidae accepted by the World Spider Catalog as of January 2021:

== Bothriocyrtum ==
Bothriocyrtum Simon, 1891

- B. californicum (O. Pickard-Cambridge, 1874) (type) — USA
- B. fabrile Simon, 1891 — Mexico
- B. tractabile Saito, 1933 — Taiwan

== Conothele ==
Conothele

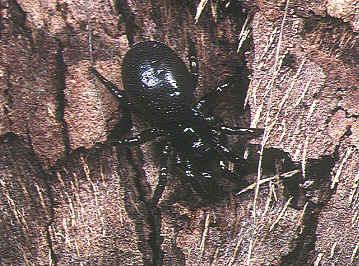
Conothele fragaria

Conothele Thorell, 1878

- Conothele arboricola Pocock, 1899 – Papua New Guinea (New Britain), Australia (Queensland)
- Conothele baisha H. Liu, Xu, Zhang, F. Liu & Li, 2019 – China (Hainan)
- Conothele baiyunensis X. Xu, C. Xu & Liu, 2017 – China
- Conothele baoting H. Liu, Xu, Zhang, F. Liu & Li, 2019 – China (Hainan)
- Conothele birmanica Thorell, 1887 – Myanmar
- Conothele cambridgei Thorell, 1890 – Indonesia (Sumatra)
- Conothele cangshan Yang & Xu, 2018 – China
- Conothele chinnarensis Sunil Jose, 2021 – India
- Conothele daxinensis X. Xu, C. Xu & Liu, 2017 – China
- Conothele deqin Yang & Xu, 2018 – China
- Conothele doleschalli Thorell, 1881 – Australia (Queensland)
- Conothele ferox Strand, 1913 – New Guinea
- Conothele fragaria (Dönitz, 1887) – Japan
- Conothele giganticus Siliwal & Raven, 2015 – India
- Conothele gressitti (Roewer, 1963) – Micronesia
- Conothele hebredisiana Berland, 1938 – Vanuatu
- Conothele isan Decae, Schwendinger & Hongpadharakiree, 2021 – Thailand
- Conothele jinggangshan H. Liu, Xu, Zhang, F. Liu & Li, 2019 – China
- Conothele khunthokhanbi Kananbala, Bhubaneshwari & Siliwal, 2015 – India
- Conothele lampra (Chamberlin, 1917) – USA?
- Conothele limatior Kulczyński, 1908 – New Guinea
- Conothele linzhi H. Liu, Xu, Zhang, F. Liu & Li, 2019 – China
- Conothele malayana (Doleschall, 1859) (type) – Indonesia (Moluccas), New Guinea, Australia
- Conothele martensi Decae, Schwendinger & Hongpadharakiree, 2021 – Thailand
- Conothele medoga Zhang & Yu, 2021 – China
- Conothele nigriceps Pocock, 1898 – Solomon Is.
- Conothele ogalei Sanap, Pawar, Joglekar & Khandekar, 2022 – India
- Conothele sidiechongensis X. Xu, C. Xu & Liu, 2017 – China, Laos
- Conothele spinosa Hogg, 1914 – New Guinea
- Conothele taiwanensis (Tso, Haupt & Zhu, 2003) – Taiwan
- Conothele trachypus Kulczyński, 1908 – Papua New Guinea (New Britain)
- Conothele truncicola Saaristo, 2002 – Seychelles
- Conothele vali Siliwal, Nair, Molur & Raven, 2009 – India
- Conothele varvarti Siliwal, Nair, Molur & Raven, 2009 – India
- Conothele yundingensis X. Xu, C. Xu & Liu, 2017 – China

== Cyclocosmia ==
Cyclocosmia

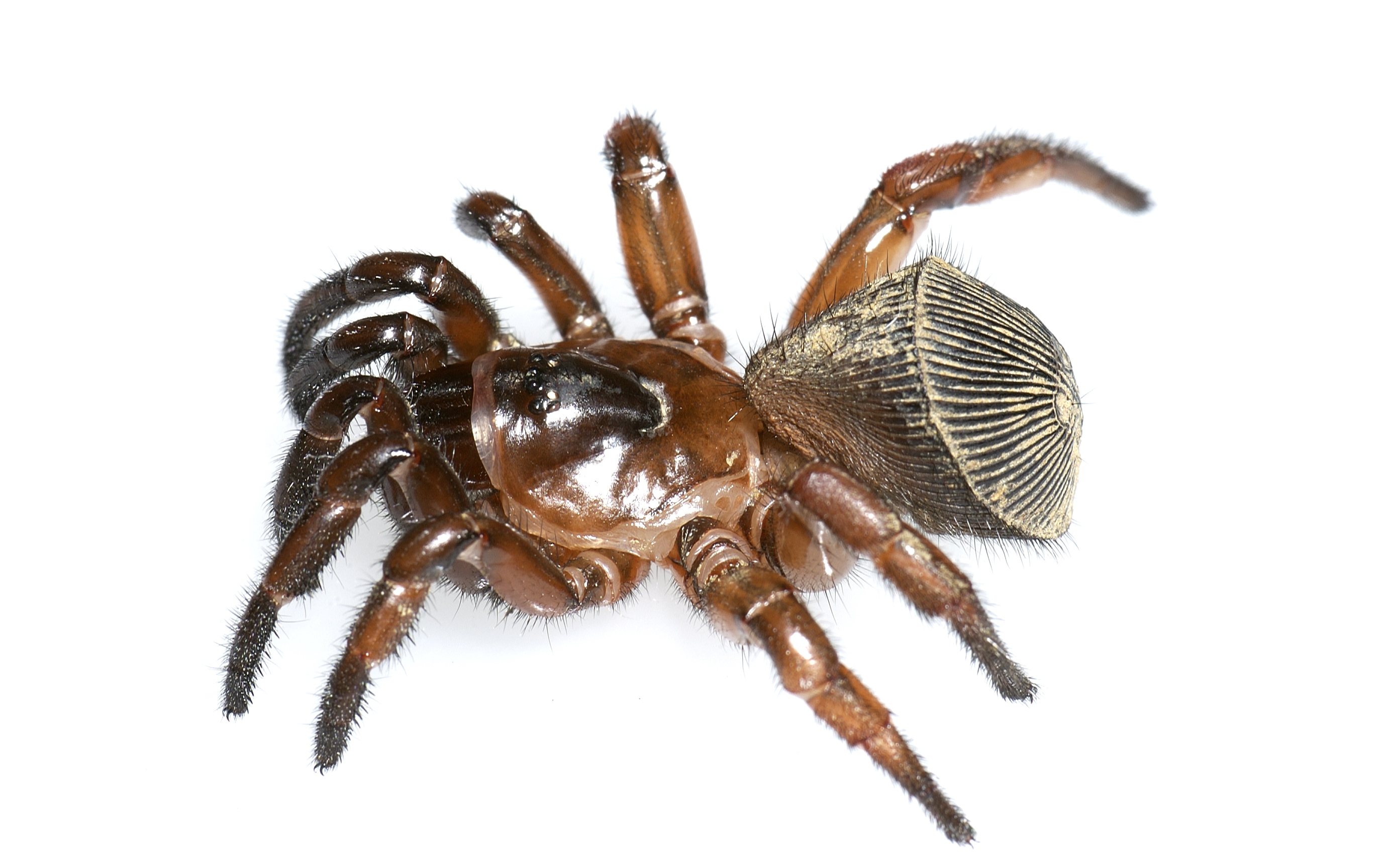
Cyclocosmia truncata

Cyclocosmia Ausserer, 1871

- C. lannaensis Schwendinger, 2005 — China, Thailand
- C. latusicosta Zhu, Zhang & Zhang, 2006 — China, Vietnam
- C. liui Xu, Xu & Li, 2017 — China
- C. loricata (C. L. Koch, 1842) — Mexico
- C. ricketti (Pocock, 1901) — China
- C. siamensis Schwendinger, 2005 — Thailand, Laos
- C. sublatusicosta Yu & Zhang, 2018 — China
- C. subricketti Yu & Zhang, 2018 — China
- C. torreya Gertsch & Platnick, 1975 — USA
- C. truncata (Hentz, 1841) (type) — USA

== Hebestatis ==
Hebestatis

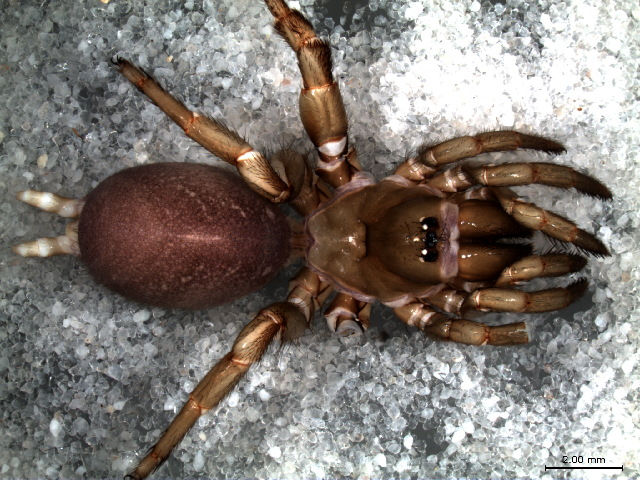
Hebestatis sp

Hebestatis Simon, 1903

- H. theveneti (Simon, 1891) (type) — USA

== Latouchia ==
Latouchia

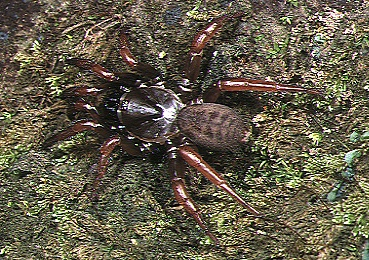
Latouchia formosensis, female

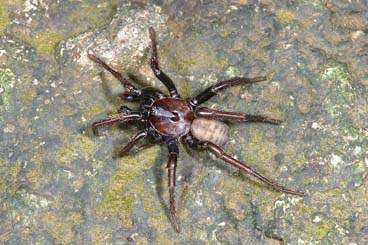
Latouchia parameleomene, male

Latouchia Pocock, 1901

- Latouchia bachmaensis Ono, 2010 – Vietnam
- Latouchia cornuta Song, Qiu & Zheng, 1983 – China
- Latouchia cryptica (Simon, 1897) – India
- Latouchia cunicularia (Simon, 1886) – Vietnam
- Latouchia davidi (Simon, 1886) (type) – China
- Latouchia formosensis Kayashima, 1943 – Taiwan
  - Latouchia f. smithi Tso, Haupt & Zhu, 2003 – Taiwan
- Latouchia fossoria Pocock, 1901 – China
- Latouchia huberi Decae, 2019 – Vietnam
- Latouchia hunanensis Xu, Yin & Bao, 2002 – China
- Latouchia hyla Haupt & Shimojana, 2001 – Japan (Ryukyu Is.)
- Latouchia incerta Decae, Schwendinger & Hongpadharakiree, 2021 – Thailand
- Latouchia japonica Strand, 1910 – Japan
- Latouchia kitabensis (Charitonov, 1946) – Central Asia
- Latouchia maculosa Decae, Schwendinger & Hongpadharakiree, 2021 – Thailand
- Latouchia parameleomene Haupt & Shimojana, 2001 – Japan (Okinawa)
- Latouchia pavlovi Schenkel, 1953 – China
- Latouchia rufa Zhang & Wang, 2021 – China
- Latouchia schwendingeri Decae, 2019 – Vietnam
- Latouchia stridulans Decae, 2019 – Vietnam
- Latouchia swinhoei Pocock, 1901 – Japan (Ryukyu Is.)
- Latouchia typica (Kishida, 1913) – China, Japan
- Latouchia vinhiensis Schenkel, 1963 – China
- Latouchia wenruni (Lin & Li, 2023) – China (Hainan)
- Latouchia yejiei Zhang & Wang, 2021 – China (Hainan)
- Latouchia yuanjingae (Lin & Li, 2022) – China (Hainan)

== Ummidia ==
Ummidia Thorell, 1875

- U. absoluta (Gertsch & Mulaik, 1940) — USA
- U. aedificatoria (Westwood, 1840) — Morocco
- U. algarve Decae, 2010 — Portugal
- U. algeriana (Lucas, 1846) — Algeria, Tunisia
- U. armata (Ausserer, 1875) — Unknown
- U. asperula (Simon, 1889) — Venezuela
- U. audouini (Lucas, 1835) — USA
- U. beatula (Gertsch & Mulaik, 1940) — USA
- U. carabivora (Atkinson, 1886) — USA
  - U. c. emarginata (Atkinson, 1886) — USA
- U. celsa (Gertsch & Mulaik, 1940) — USA
- U. erema (Chamberlin, 1925) — Panama
- U. ferghanensis (Kroneberg, 1875) — Central Asia
- U. funerea (Gertsch, 1936) — USA
- U. gandjinoi (Andreeva, 1968) — Tajikistan
- U. glabra (Doleschall, 1871) — Brazil
- U. mischi Zonstein, 2014 — Afghanistan
- U. modesta (Banks, 1901) — USA
- U. nidulans (Fabricius, 1787) — Caribbean
- U. oaxacana (Chamberlin, 1925) — Mexico
- U. picea Thorell, 1875 (type) — Spain
- U. pustulosa (Becker, 1879) — Mexico
- U. pygmaea (Chamberlin & Ivie, 1945) — USA
- U. rugosa (Karsch, 1880) — Costa Rica, Panama
- U. salebrosa (Simon, 1892) — St. Vincent
- U. tuobita (Chamberlin, 1917) — USA
- U. zebrina (F. O. Pickard-Cambridge, 1897) — Mexico, Guatemala
- U. zilchi Kraus, 1955 — Mexico, El Salvador
- † U. damzeni Wunderlich, 2000
- † U. malinowskii Wunderlich, 2000
