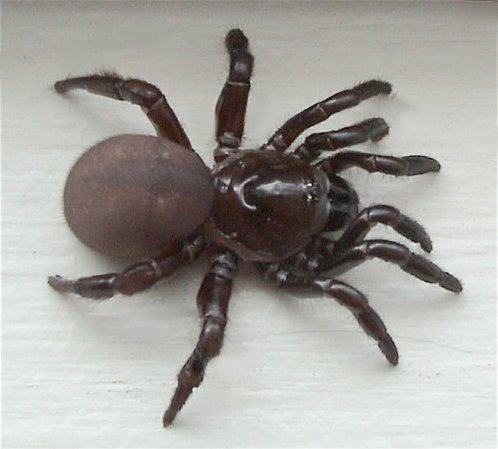
- Trap-Door Spider, Ummidia sp., from Austin, Texas

Scientific classification
- Kingdom: Animalia
- Phylum: Arthropoda
- Subphylum: Chelicerata
- Class: Arachnida
- Order: Araneae
- Infraorder: Mygalomorphae
- Family: Halonoproctidae
- Genus: Ummidia; Thorell, 1875

Type species
- U. picea Thorell, 1875

Species
- 56, see text

Synonyms
- Pachylomerides Strand, 1934

= Ummidia =

Ummidia Temporal range: Palaeogene–present

Genus of spiders

Ummidia is a genus of mygalomorph spiders in the family Halonoproctidae, and was first described by Tamerlan Thorell in 1875. It is a genus of small to large trapdoor spiders that are usually black to very dark brown in color. It is a widely-distributed genus found in the southwestern Mediterranean, Central Asia, and in the Americas from Ohio south to Brazil. They live in hard-to-find silk-lined burrows hidden in leaf litter.

== Taxonomy ==
Ummidia split from the morphologically similar genus Conothele over 50 million years ago.

== Description ==
Ummidia species are small to large trapdoor spiders, usually black to very dark brown in color. The abdominal coloration is generally dark grey, occasionally with a bright white dorsal patch, pale opalescence, or light patches at the apodemes. The cephalothorax is longer than it is wide. The pars cephalica is highest behind the eyes and sloping posteriorly. The carapace is evenly sclerotized, and is rough in males and smooth in females. The fovea is procurved and deep. At least the median eyes are on the tubercle, with the eye diameter being variable. The anterior eye row is procurved, while the posterior eye row is relatively straight to slightly recurved or procurved. The sternum is usually approximately as wide as it is long.

Ummidia can be differentiated from all other halonoproctid genera except Conothele by the presence of a dorsal, glabrous, saddle-like depression on tibia III. Ummidia can be further distinguished from Bothriocyrtum, Cyclocosmia, and Hebestatis by the presence of clavate trichobothria and the absence of lateral sternal sigilla.

== Distribution and habitat ==
Ummidia is a wide-ranging genus, found in the southwestern Mediterranean, Central Asia, and in the Americas from as far north as Ohio and Maryland west to Arizona and south to Brazil, including the Greater and Lesser Antilles. Ballooning, a peculiar behavior among most mygalomorphs, has been observed in a few species. This behavior explains the genus' presence on multiple islands in the Caribbean, including the volcanic island of St. Vincent and possibly Bermuda.

Ummidia spiders construct silk-lined burrows, usually with cork-type doors. These burrows are cryptic and difficult to find and are often covered in leaf litter.

== Species ==
As of April 2022 it contained fifty-six species.

- Ummidia aedificatoria (Westwood, 1840) – Morocco
- Ummidia algarve Decae, 2010 – Portugal
- Ummidia algeriana (Lucas, 1846) – Algeria, Tunisia
- Ummidia anaya Godwin & Bond, 2021 – Mexico
- Ummidia armata (Ausserer, 1875) – Unknown
- Ummidia asperula (Simon, 1889) – Venezuela
- Ummidia audouini (Lucas, 1835) – USA
- Ummidia beatula (Gertsch & Mulaik, 1940) – USA
- Ummidia brandicarlileae Godwin & Bond, 2021 – Mexico
- Ummidia carabivora (Atkinson, 1886) – USA
- Ummidia carlosviquezi Godwin & Bond, 2021 – Nicaragua, Costa Rica
- Ummidia cerrohoya Godwin & Bond, 2021 – Panama
- Ummidia colemanae Godwin & Bond, 2021 – USA
- Ummidia cuicatec Godwin & Bond, 2021 – Mexico
- Ummidia erema (Chamberlin, 1925) – Panama
- Ummidia ferghanensis (Kroneberg, 1875) – Central Asia
- Ummidia frankellerae Godwin & Bond, 2021 – Belize
- Ummidia funerea (Gertsch, 1936) – USA
- Ummidia gabrieli Godwin & Bond, 2021 – Mexico
- Ummidia gandjinoi (Andreeva, 1968) – Tajikistan
- Ummidia gertschi Godwin & Bond, 2021 – USA
- Ummidia gingoteague Godwin & Bond, 2021 – USA
- Ummidia glabra (Doleschall, 1871) – Brazil
- Ummidia hondurena Godwin & Bond, 2021 – Honduras, El Salvador
- Ummidia huascazaloya Godwin & Bond, 2021 – Mexico
- Ummidia insularis Santos, Ortiz & Sánchez-Ruiz, 2022 – Dominican Republic
- Ummidia macarthuri Godwin & Bond, 2021 – USA
- Ummidia matagalpa Godwin & Bond, 2021 – Nicaragua
- Ummidia mercedesburnsae Godwin & Bond, 2021 – USA
- Ummidia mischi Zonstein, 2014 – Afghanistan
- Ummidia modesta (Banks, 1901) – USA
- Ummidia neblina Godwin & Bond, 2021 – Venezuela
- Ummidia neilgaimani Godwin & Bond, 2021 – USA
- Ummidia nidulans (Fabricius, 1787) – Jamaica, West Indies
- Ummidia okefenokee Godwin & Bond, 2021 – USA
- Ummidia paulacushingae Godwin & Bond, 2021 – USA
- Ummidia pesiou Godwin & Bond, 2021 – Mexico
- Ummidia picea Thorell, 1875 (type) – Spain
- Ummidia pustulosa (Becker, 1879) – Mexico
- Ummidia quepoa Godwin & Bond, 2021 – Costa Rica
- Ummidia quijichacaca Godwin & Bond, 2021 – Colombia
- Ummidia richmond Godwin & Bond, 2021 – USA
- Ummidia riverai Godwin & Bond, 2021 – Guatemala
- Ummidia rodeo Godwin & Bond, 2021 – Mexico
- Ummidia rongodwini Godwin & Bond, 2021 – USA
- Ummidia rosillos Godwin & Bond, 2021 – USA
- Ummidia rugosa (Karsch, 1880) – Nicaragua, Costa Rica
- Ummidia salebrosa (Simon, 1892) – St. Vincent
- Ummidia tibacuy Godwin & Bond, 2021 – Colombia
- Ummidia timcotai Godwin & Bond, 2021 – USA
- Ummidia tunapuna Godwin & Bond, 2021 – Trinidad and Tobago
- Ummidia varablanca Godwin & Bond, 2021 – Costa Rica
- Ummidia waunekaae Godwin & Bond, 2021 – USA
- Ummidia zebrina (F. O. Pickard-Cambridge, 1897) – Mexico, Guatemala
- Ummidia zilchi Kraus, 1955 – Mexico, El Salvador, Belize
