= Ummidia aedificatoria =

Scientific classification
- Domain: Eukaryota
- Kingdom: Animalia
- Phylum: Arthropoda
- Subphylum: Chelicerata
- Class: Arachnida
- Order: Araneae
- Infraorder: Mygalomorphae
- Family: Halonoproctidae
- Genus: Ummidia
- Species: U. aedificatoria

Binomial name
- Ummidia aedificatoria (Westwood, 1840)

Synonyms
- Actinopus aedificatorius; Cteniza aedificatoria; Pachylomerus aedificatorius; Pachylomerus occidentalis; Sphodros aedificatorius

Species of spider

Ummidia aedificatoria is a species of trap-door spider found in Portugal, Spain and Morocco. It builds a shallow silk-lined trapdoor burrow, similar to those of U. algeriana and U. picea. Only three female specimens have been positively identified, all ranging from 18 to 29 millimeters in length.
