= Ummidia richmond =

Scientific classification
- Kingdom: Animalia
- Phylum: Arthropoda
- Subphylum: Chelicerata
- Class: Arachnida
- Order: Araneae
- Infraorder: Mygalomorphae
- Family: Halonoproctidae
- Genus: Ummidia
- Species: U. richmond

Binomial name
- Ummidia richmond Godwin & Bond, 2021

Species of spider

Ummidia richmond is a species of spider in the family Halonoproctidae. It was formally described in 2021 and is named after Richmond, an area near a former sawmill camp that now contains the second largest remaining fragment of critically endangered pine rockland habitat in Florida. It is endemic to Florida, where it has been recorded from Collier, Miami-Dade, and Monroe counties.

== Taxonomy ==
Ummidia richmond was formally described in 2021 based on an adult male specimen collected from near the community of Perrine in Miami-Dade County, Florida. The specific epithet refers to Richmond, originally a small sawmill camp and now known as the Richmond Tract. It contains the second largest remaining fragment of critically endangered pine rockland habitat, the habitat in which the spiders were found, in the state.

== Description ==
Ummidia richmond can be differentiated from U. audouini by the presence of a comb on the retrolateral face of tarsus IV which is more defined than the comb in U. neilgaimani. Males can further be distinguished from U. gingoteague and U. carabivora by lacking spines on the prolateral aspect of tibia I and from U. rongodwini by lacking a pale dorsal heart patch. It can be differentiated from U. rongodwini by having eyes relatively smaller and more removed from the anterior margin of the carapace. Males disperse from May to June.

== Distribution and habitat ==
The spider is endemic to Florida, where it has been recorded from Collier, Miami-Dade, and Monroe counties. It is known from Fort Myers in Collier Cpunty, Everglades National Park, Perrine, and Zoo Miami in Miami-Dade County, and Big Pine Key in Monroe County. It inhabits pine rocklands.
