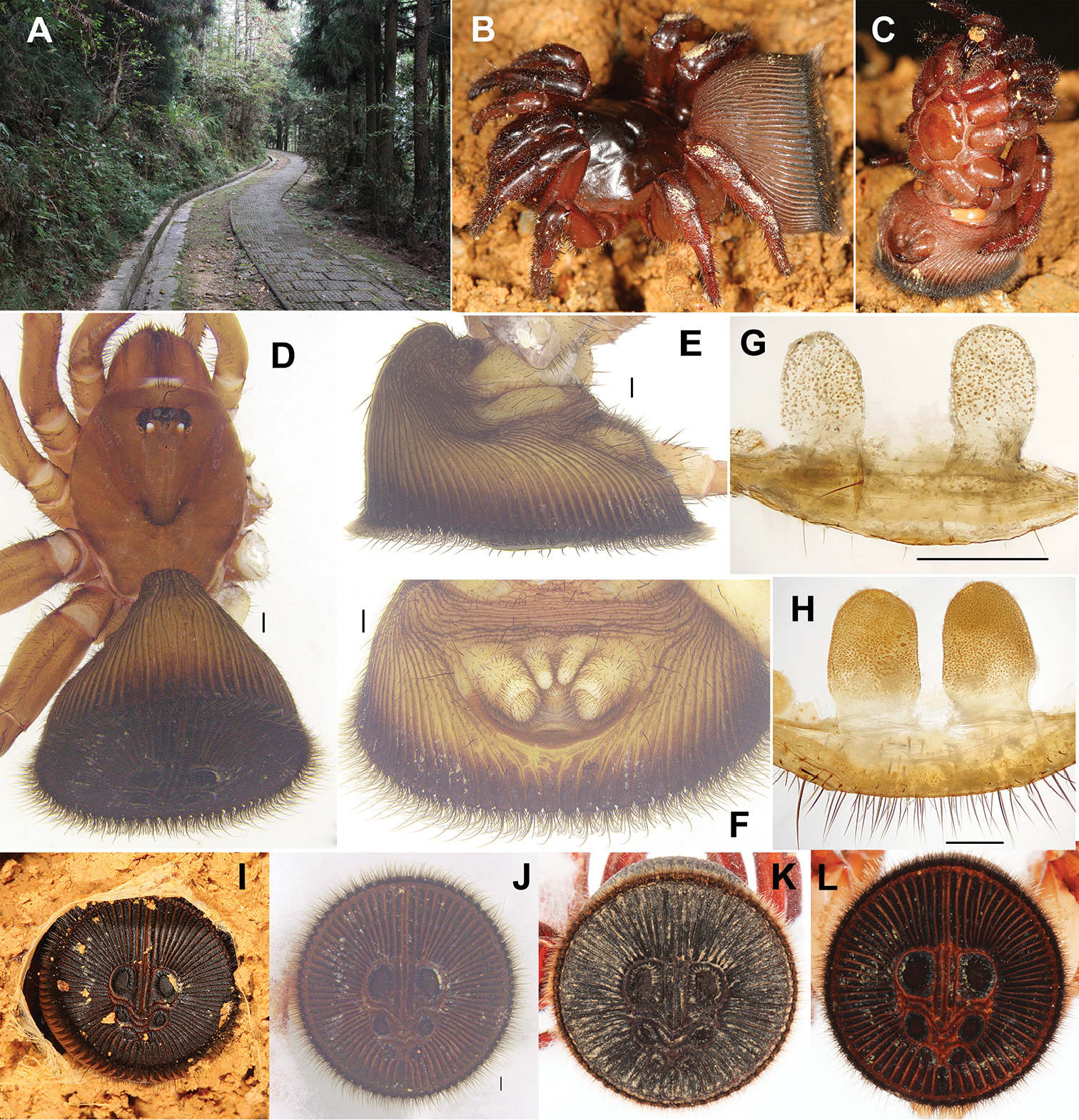
- A habitat B–D habitus of female (XUC-2013-013) E abdomen, lateral view F posterior portion of opisthosoma, ventral view, showing spinnerets G female genitalia (XUC-2013-013), dorsal view H female genitalia (tianzishan-2016), dorsal view I showing opisthosomal disc in plugging position (XUC-2013-013) J–L abdomen, caudal view (J XUC-2013-013 K Tianzishan-2016 L C-2016-001). Scale bars 0.5 mm.

Scientific classification
- Kingdom: Animalia
- Phylum: Arthropoda
- Subphylum: Chelicerata
- Class: Arachnida
- Order: Araneae
- Infraorder: Mygalomorphae
- Family: Halonoproctidae
- Genus: Cyclocosmia
- Species: C. ricketti

Binomial name
- Cyclocosmia ricketti (Pocock, 1901)

= Cyclocosmia ricketti =

Species of spider

Cyclocosmia ricketti (Chinese: 里氏盤腹蛛; pinyin: Lǐ shì pán fù zhū), commonly known as the Chinese hourglass spider, is a species of trapdoor spider of the genus Cyclocosmia. Cyclocosmia ricketti is native to China and it was first described (under its scientific name) in 1901 by Mary Pocock. They are characterized by their truncated abdomen and the patterned rigid disk at the bottom.

== Names ==
The species was first identified in 1901 by the South African scientist Mary Pocock and was named Halonoproctus ricketti in honour of Charles Boughey Rickett. It was reclassified as Cyclocosmia ricketti in 1903.

In China, C. ricketti is known under a number of different names including the "Money Trapdoor Spider" (traditional Chinese: 金錢活板門蛛; simplified Chinese: 金钱活板门蛛; pinyin: Jīnqián huó bǎn mén zhū), "Money Living-Door Spider" (traditional Chinese: 金錢活門蛛; simplified Chinese: 金钱活门蛛; pinyin: Jīnqián huómén zhū), and the "Severed Abdomen Spider" (Chinese: 截腹蛛; pinyin: Jié fù zhū). In English, it is commonly known as the "Chinese hourglass spider" (alongside other members of its genus).

== Description ==
Cyclocosmia ricketti has a distinctive plate or disk on its abdomen which resembles an ancient coin, a seal, or a grinding disc. The male Cyclocosmia ricketti are about 20.5 millimeters in length while the females of the species tend to be slightly larger at around 25.83 to 30.0 millimeters in length. The largest known specimens of Cyclocosmia ricketti can exceed 3 centimeters. The disk located on its abdomen typically has a radius of around 1.6 centimeters.

According to Zhao Li, Director and Senior Biological Engineer of the Insect Museum of West China in Chengdu, Sichuan, Cyclocosmia ricketti is a nocturnal animal. The scarcity of this arachnid can be explained by its way of habitation.

Cyclocosmia ricketti, like many other trapdoor spiders, dig burrows which are closed off by hatches in the ground instead of making webs (as they are not good at spinning silk) to catch their prey. They line their burrows with silk threads and mud. They use their disk to plug the opening of the burrow. When a small insect steps on its disk (sometimes referred to as a "copper coin"), C. ricketti will purportedly shrink its abdomen to allow its prey to fall further into its burrow to be devoured. The coin-shaped disk makes it difficult for its prey to escape from its grasp. C. ricketti does not always use this method to hunt, as when it is confronted with a non-threatening insect, it will exit from its burrow and then directly grab it to eat it. C. ricketti can also use the coin-shaped disk on its abdomen to protect itself from enemies by blocking the entrance to its burrow with it and using it as a shield, a phenomenon called phragmosis.

== Possible mentions in ancient Chinese sources ==
According to the Director and Senior Biological Engineer of the Insect Museum of West China (traditional Chinese: 華希昆蟲博物館; simplified Chinese: 华希昆虫博物馆; pinyin: Huá xī kūnchóng bówùguǎn) in Chengdu, Sichuan. Zhao Li (traditional Chinese: 趙力; simplified Chinese: 赵力; pinyin: Zhào Lì) Cyclocosmia ricketti fits the description of a type of arachnid that was mentioned in the Erya as well as the Bencao Shiyi (traditional Chinese: 本草拾遺; simplified Chinese: 本草拾遗; pinyin: Běncǎo shíyí, "Supplement to the Materia Medica").

"The diedang (螲蟷 a species of spider living in underground burrows) is found everywhere……it resembles a spider….a hole in the ground is the nest and on top of the hole is a cover.” The diedang can be used to treat “boils, gangrene and other sores, sarcoma (malignant tumor)."

- Excerpt from the Bencao Shiyi, dated to the year 739 CE written Tang dynasty pharmacologist Chen Cangqi (traditional Chinese: 陳藏器; simplified Chinese: 陈藏器; pinyin: Chén Cángqì), translated into English by Gary Ashkenazy (加里·阿什凱納齊) from the Primal Trek – a journey through Chinese culture website.

The bite of Cyclocosmia ricketti is low risk and considered to be non toxic to humans. Despite the low toxicity, their bites are known to be painful.

== Distribution ==
Cyclocosmia ricketti are found in the Chinese provinces of Fujian, Zhejiang, and Sichuan. They are primarily found living in caves. The furthest north they are known to have been found is Sichuan. In 2016, a farmer was working in his garden in Pujiang County, Sichuan province when he thought he found a valuable ancient seal, but realized that it was actually a spider. It was previously believed that C. ricketti could not survive in temperatures below 13 degrees Celsius.

Cyclocosmia ricketti is a very rare species and between the years 2000 and 2016, only six of them were spotted in China.

== As pets ==
Due to the rarity of Cyclocosmia ricketti, they are expensive pets. On the pet market, they are often known as "Money Trapdoor spiders" and are bred in Thailand.

In 2021, a Cyclocosmia ricketti sold for $3,860 (or about 25,000 yuan). This is more than double the amount in 2016, when they were selling for as much as 12,000 RMB online.
