= Torreya trap-door spider =

Conservation status
- Data Deficient (IUCN 2.3)

Scientific classification
- Kingdom: Animalia
- Phylum: Arthropoda
- Subphylum: Chelicerata
- Class: Arachnida
- Order: Araneae
- Infraorder: Mygalomorphae
- Family: Halonoproctidae
- Genus: Cyclocosmia
- Species: C. torreya

Binomial name
- Cyclocosmia torreya Gertsch & Platnick, 1975

Species of spider

The Torreya trap-door spider (Cyclocosmia torreya) is a species of spider in the family Halonoproctidae. It is endemic to the United States, and hitherto only known from along the Apalachicola River in Florida.
