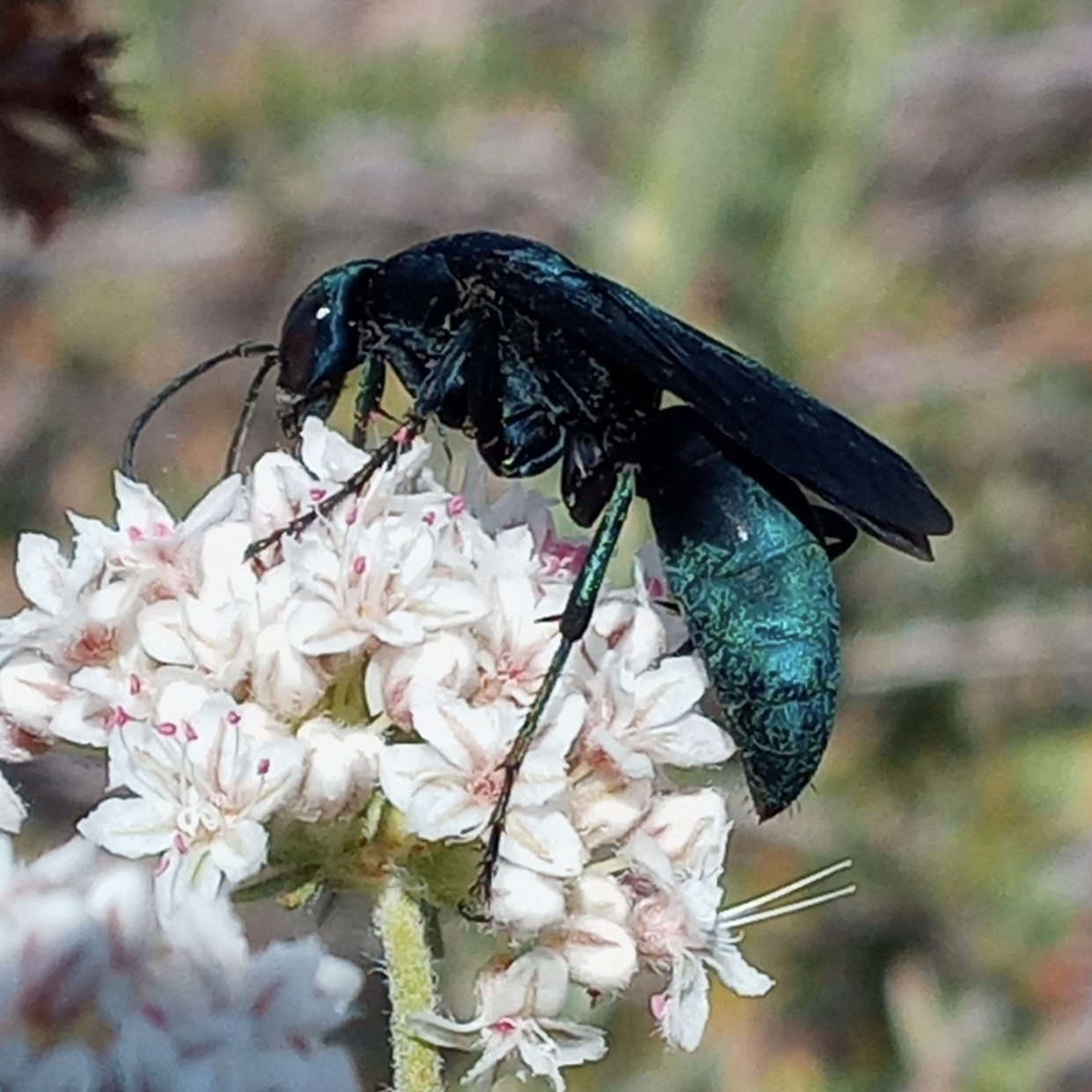

Scientific classification
- Domain: Eukaryota
- Kingdom: Animalia
- Phylum: Arthropoda
- Class: Insecta
- Order: Hymenoptera
- Family: Pompilidae
- Genus: Psorthaspis
- Species: P. planata

Binomial name
- Psorthaspis planata Fox (1892)

= Psorthaspis planata =

Species of wasp

Psorthaspis planata is a spider-hunting wasp of western North America, mostly commonly observed in the Californias. Prey species include the California trapdoor spider. According to entomologist J. Chester Bradley in 1944, the females of Psorthaspis planata have "the tops of the eyes remote from the top of the head, and the ocelli placed low. The males have purplish tomentum and wholly black wings, like the females."
