= Heteromigas dovei =

Scientific classification
- Kingdom: Animalia
- Phylum: Arthropoda
- Subphylum: Chelicerata
- Class: Arachnida
- Order: Araneae
- Infraorder: Mygalomorphae
- Family: Migidae
- Genus: Heteromigas
- Species: H. dovei

Binomial name
- Heteromigas dovei Hogg, 1902

Species of spider

Heteromigas dovei is a species of tree trapdoor spider in the Migidae family. It is endemic to Australia. It was described in 1902 by British arachnologist Henry Roughton Hogg.

== Distribution and habitat ==
The species occurs in Tasmania. The type locality is Table Cape.
