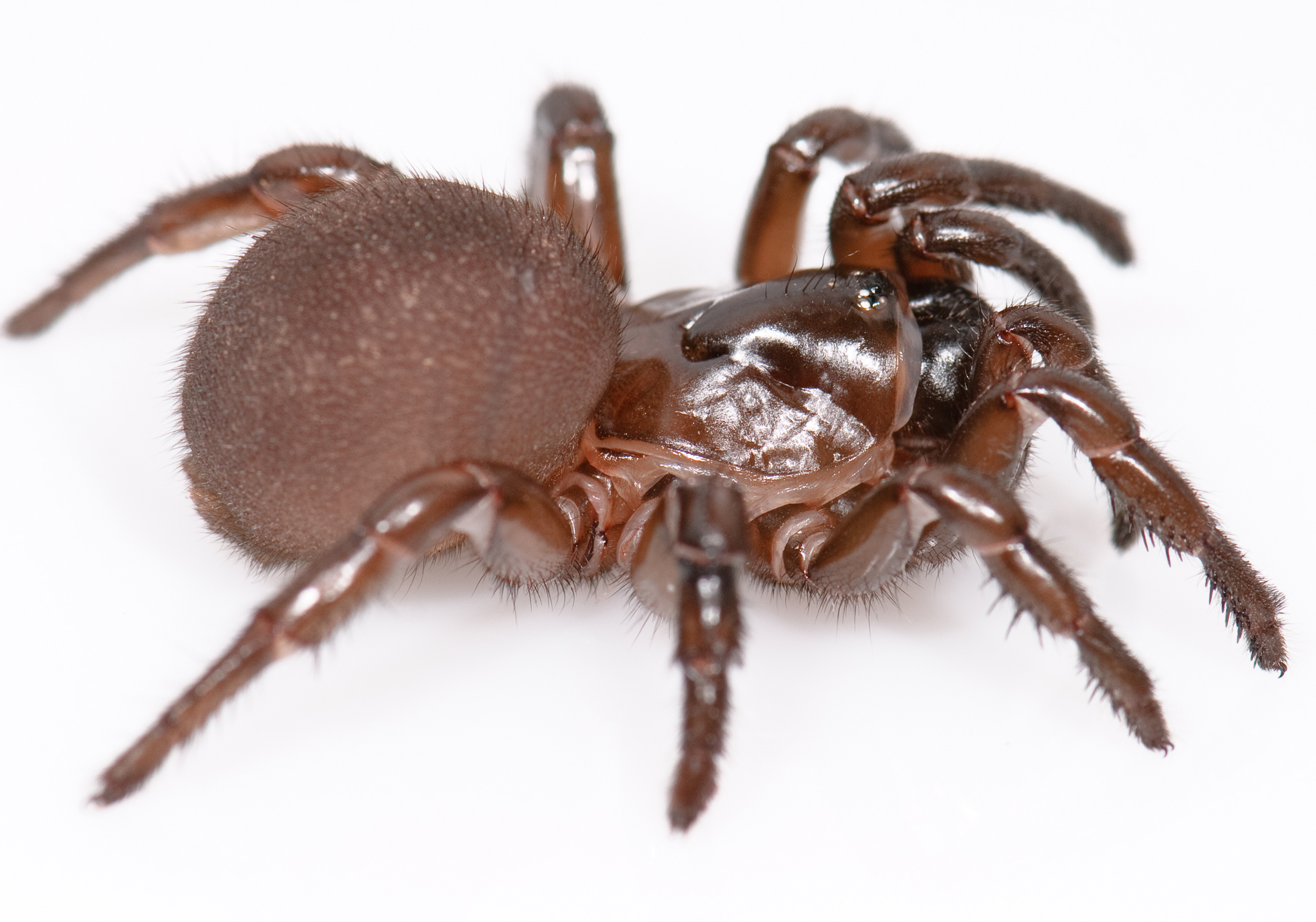

Scientific classification
- Kingdom: Animalia
- Phylum: Arthropoda
- Subphylum: Chelicerata
- Class: Arachnida
- Order: Araneae
- Infraorder: Mygalomorphae
- Family: Halonoproctidae
- Genus: Hebestatis
- Species: H. theveneti

Binomial name
- Hebestatis theveneti (Simon, 1891)

= Hebestatis theveneti =

Species of spider

Hebestatis theveneti is a species of cork-lid trapdoor spider in the family Halonoproctidae. It is found in the United States.
