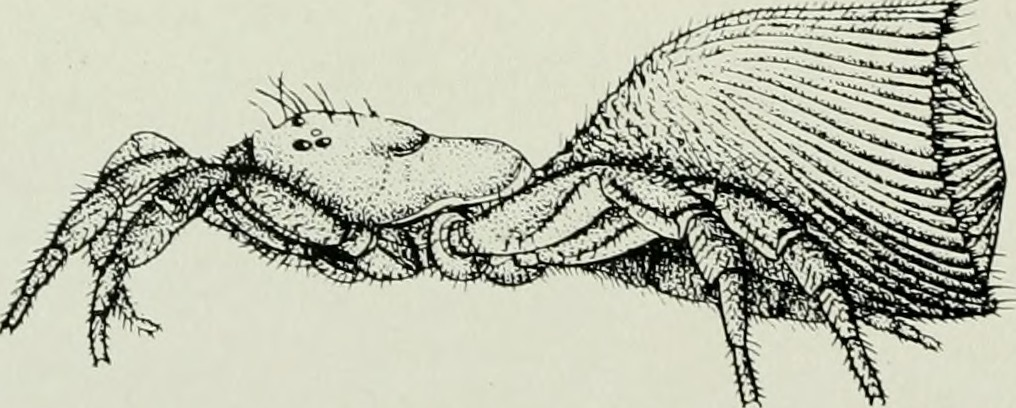

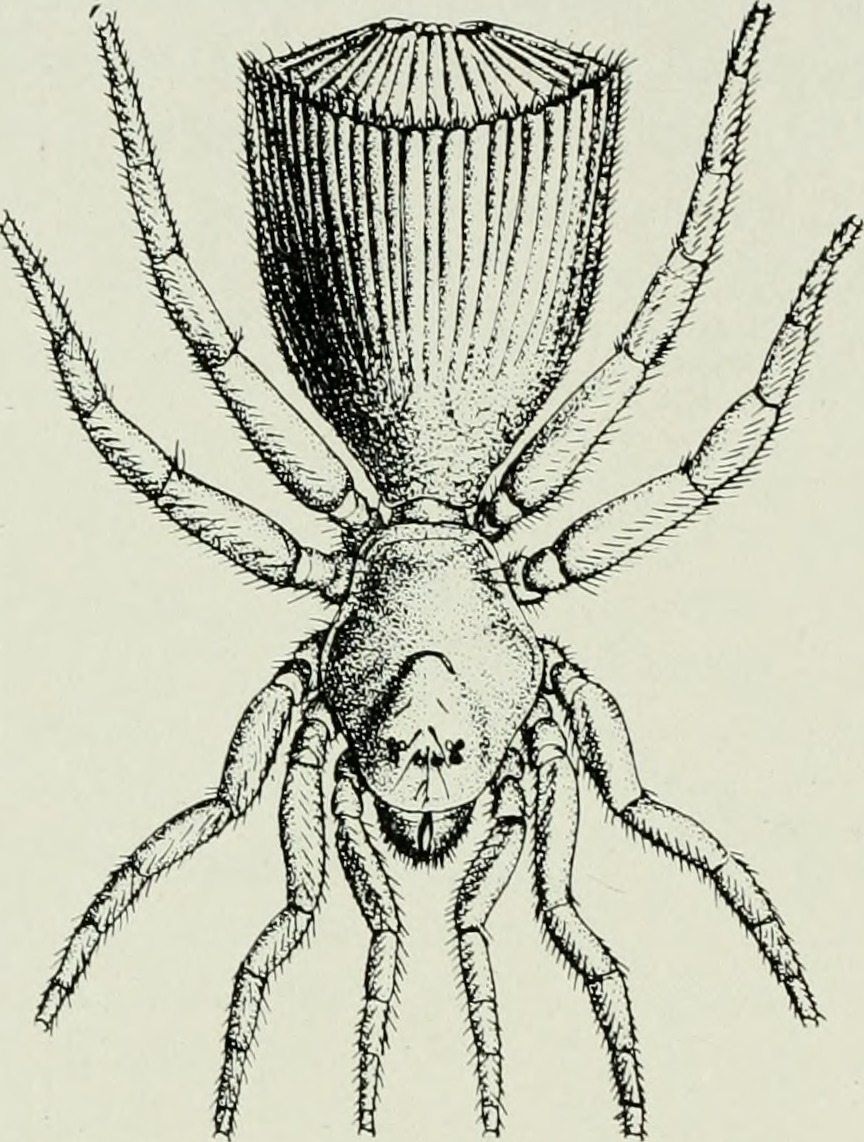

Scientific classification
- Domain: Eukaryota
- Kingdom: Animalia
- Phylum: Arthropoda
- Subphylum: Chelicerata
- Class: Arachnida
- Order: Araneae
- Infraorder: Mygalomorphae
- Family: Halonoproctidae
- Genus: Cyclocosmia
- Species: C. loricata

Binomial name
- Cyclocosmia loricata (Koch, 1842)

= Cyclocosmia loricata =

Species of Spider

Cyclocosmia loricata is a species of trapdoor spider of the genus Cyclocosmia. Full-grown adults can reach 1.1 inches in size. The species is endemic to Mexico, but has also been observed in Guatemala.
