= Heteromigas terraereginae =

Scientific classification
- Kingdom: Animalia
- Phylum: Arthropoda
- Subphylum: Chelicerata
- Class: Arachnida
- Order: Araneae
- Infraorder: Mygalomorphae
- Family: Migidae
- Genus: Heteromigas
- Species: H. terraereginae

Binomial name
- Heteromigas terraereginae Raven, 1984

Species of spider

Heteromigas terraereginae is a species of tree trapdoor spider in the Migidae family. It is endemic to Australia. It was described in 1984 by Australian arachnologist Robert Raven.

== Distribution and habitat ==
The species occurs in north-east Queensland in montane habitat.
