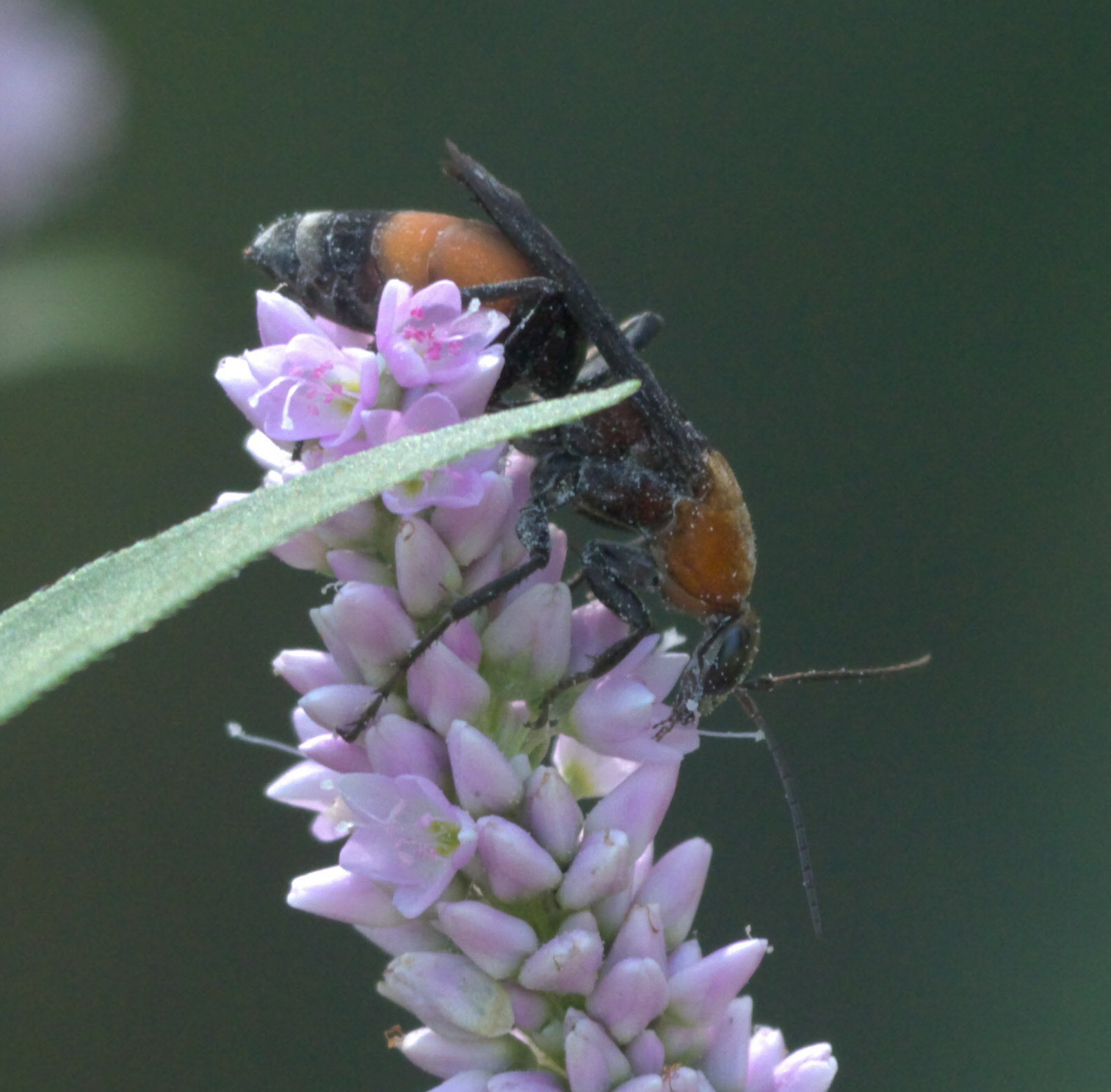

Scientific classification
- Domain: Eukaryota
- Kingdom: Animalia
- Phylum: Arthropoda
- Class: Insecta
- Order: Hymenoptera
- Family: Pompilidae
- Genus: Psorthaspis
- Species: P. sanguinea

Binomial name
- Psorthaspis sanguinea (Smith, 1855)

= Psorthaspis sanguinea =

Species of spider wasp

Psorthaspis sanguinea is a species of spider wasp in the family Pompilidae.

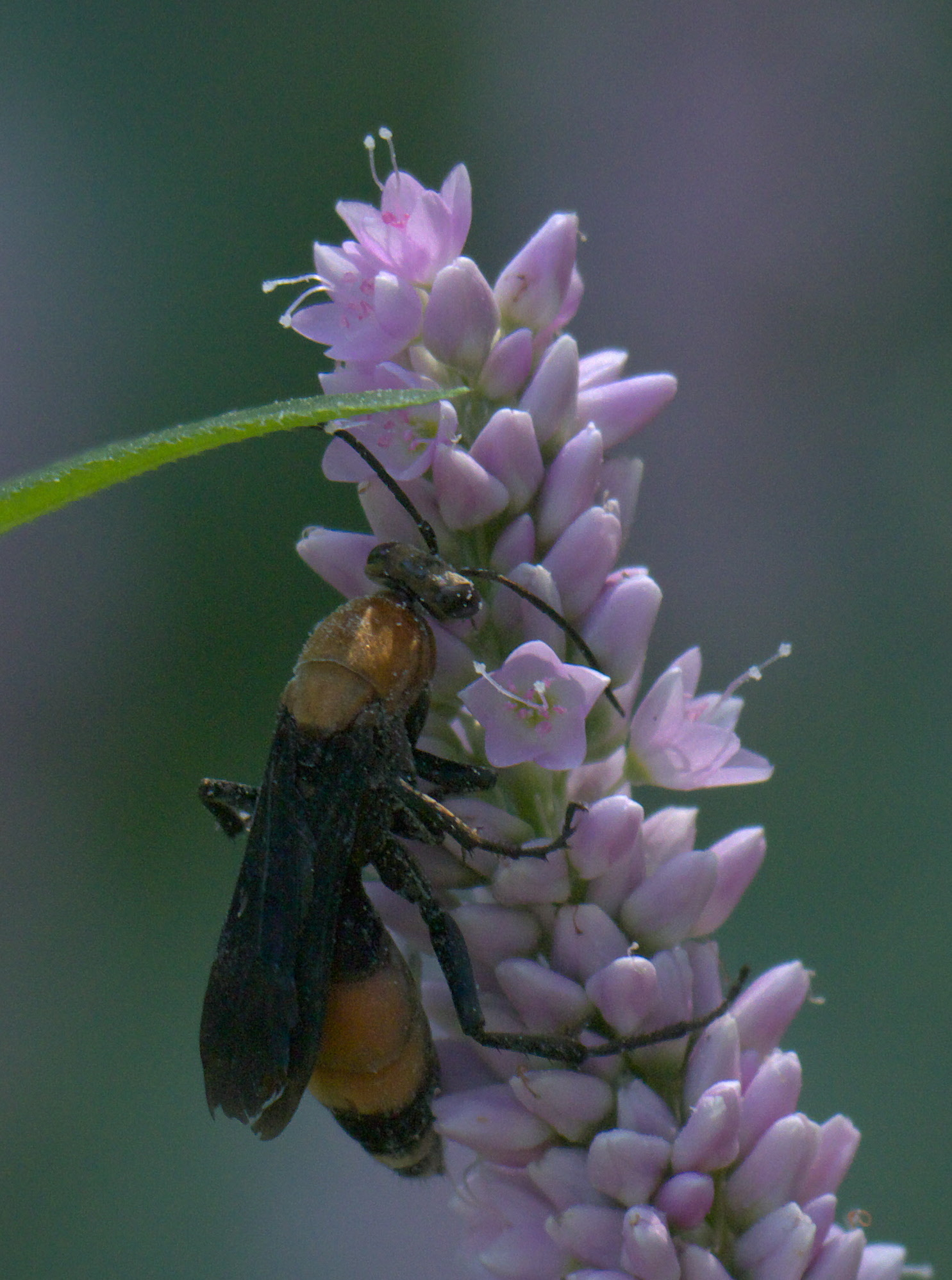
