= Conothele doleschalli =

Scientific classification
- Kingdom: Animalia
- Phylum: Arthropoda
- Subphylum: Chelicerata
- Class: Arachnida
- Order: Araneae
- Infraorder: Mygalomorphae
- Family: Halonoproctidae
- Genus: Conothele
- Species: C. doleschalli

Binomial name
- Conothele doleschalli Thorell, 1881

Synonyms
- Conothele doleschallii Thorell, 1881

Species of spider

Conothele doleschalli is a species of mygalomorph spider in the Halonoproctidae family. It is found in Australia and New Guinea, and was described in 1881 by Swedish arachnologist Tamerlan Thorell.

== Distribution and habitat ==
The species occurs in Far North Queensland and south-eastern Papua New Guinea. The type locality is Somerset, at the northern tip of the Cape York Peninsula.

== Behaviour ==
The spiders are fossorial, terrestrial predators.
