= Ummidia algarve =

Scientific classification
- Domain: Eukaryota
- Kingdom: Animalia
- Phylum: Arthropoda
- Subphylum: Chelicerata
- Class: Arachnida
- Order: Araneae
- Infraorder: Mygalomorphae
- Family: Halonoproctidae
- Genus: Ummidia
- Species: U. algarve

Binomial name
- Ummidia algarve Decae, 2010

Species of spider

Ummidia algarve is a spider species found in Portugal. Unlike other known Ummidia species, it creates a trapdoor at the entrance of the burrow.

== Taxonomy and etymology ==
U. algarve was misidentified by three authors, (O. Pickard-Cambridge (1908), Frade & Amelia Bacelar (1931) and Bacelar again (1937)), before Arthur Decae gave it its present (August, 2016) name, Ummidia algarve.

Its specific name means "of Algarve", the region and Moorish medieval kingdom in South Portugal it was found in. The geographically inspired name was chosen because ctenizids are often endemic to certain specific regions.

== Biology ==
Ummidia algarve is very common in the Algarve, often in close association with nemesiid spiders. It has a burrow structure unique to the species (other than Conothele varvarti in India): a trapdoor at the entrance of the burrow and an inverted trapdoor near the bottom of the burrow. Females might be the only ones to do this. All other known Ummidia species have no internal structures other than the silk lining of the burrow.

== Description ==
Female Ummidia algarve have short, straight, "mushroom-shaped" spermathecae and a warty texture to the abdominal cuticle. These warts are the individual sockets of bristles on the abdomen. The cephalothorax is smooth and shining. The chelicerae are large and dorsally black (ventrally orange-brown), with the fang serrated on the inner ridge. The cephalic area is smoothly elevated. The ocelli are arranged in two rows, near the anterior edge of the cephalothorax, set compactly around a small ocular process, the anterior row is strongly procurved and the posterior row is slightly recurved. Its total body length is 14.5 mm.

Males have a relatively short, strong and smoothly curved embolus with a subapical fishhook tooth and low ocular quadrangle ratio. The cephalothorax is black with shades of red; it is also granulated. The opisthosoma is warty as in the female. The chelicerae are black dorsally and ventrally orange-brown.
