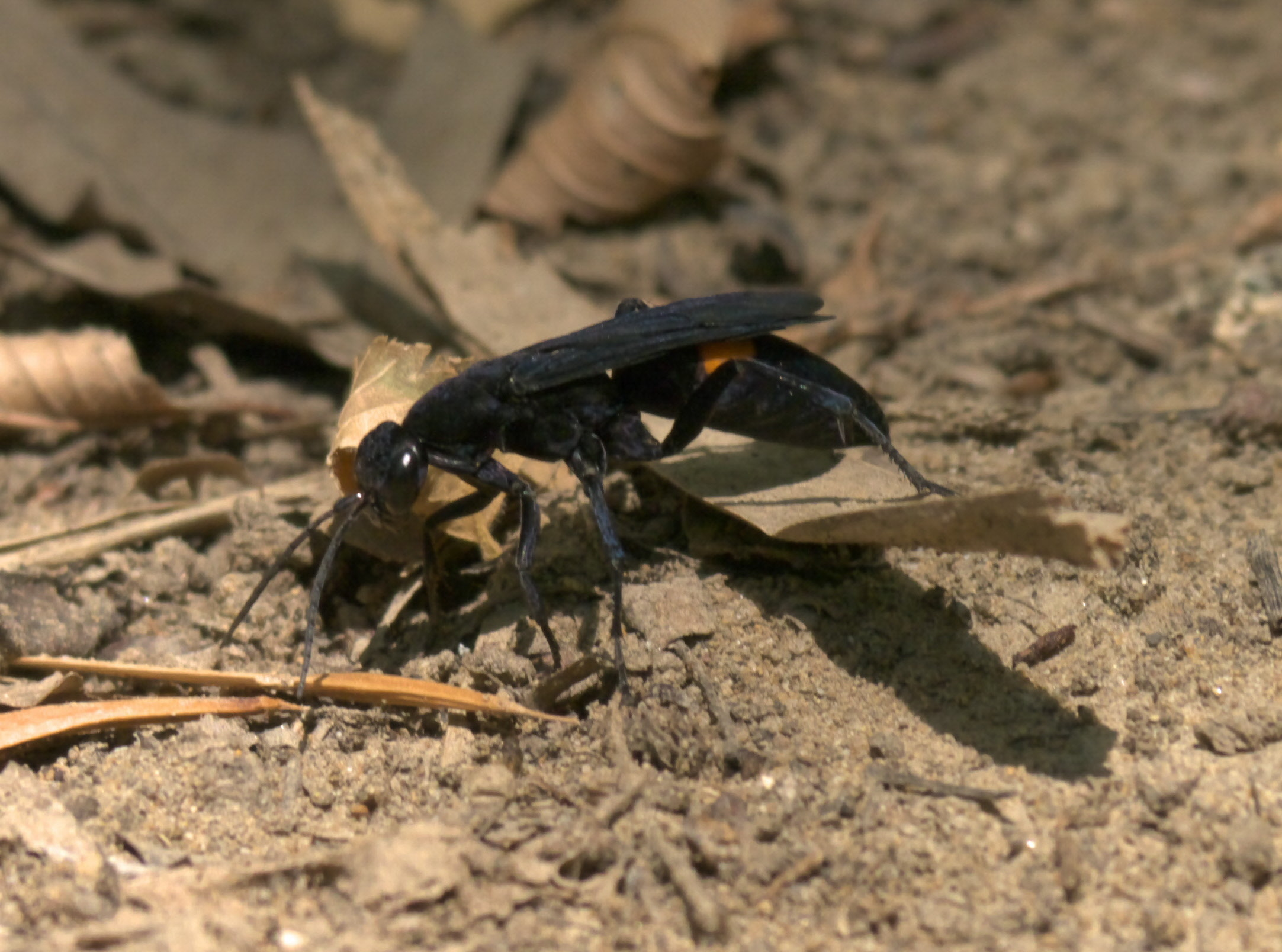

Scientific classification
- Kingdom: Animalia
- Phylum: Arthropoda
- Clade: Pancrustacea
- Class: Insecta
- Order: Hymenoptera
- Family: Pompilidae
- Genus: Psorthaspis
- Species: P. brimleyi

Binomial name
- Psorthaspis brimleyi (Malloch, 1928)

= Psorthaspis brimleyi =

Species of spider wasp

Psorthaspis brimleyi is a species of spider wasp in the family Pompilidae.
