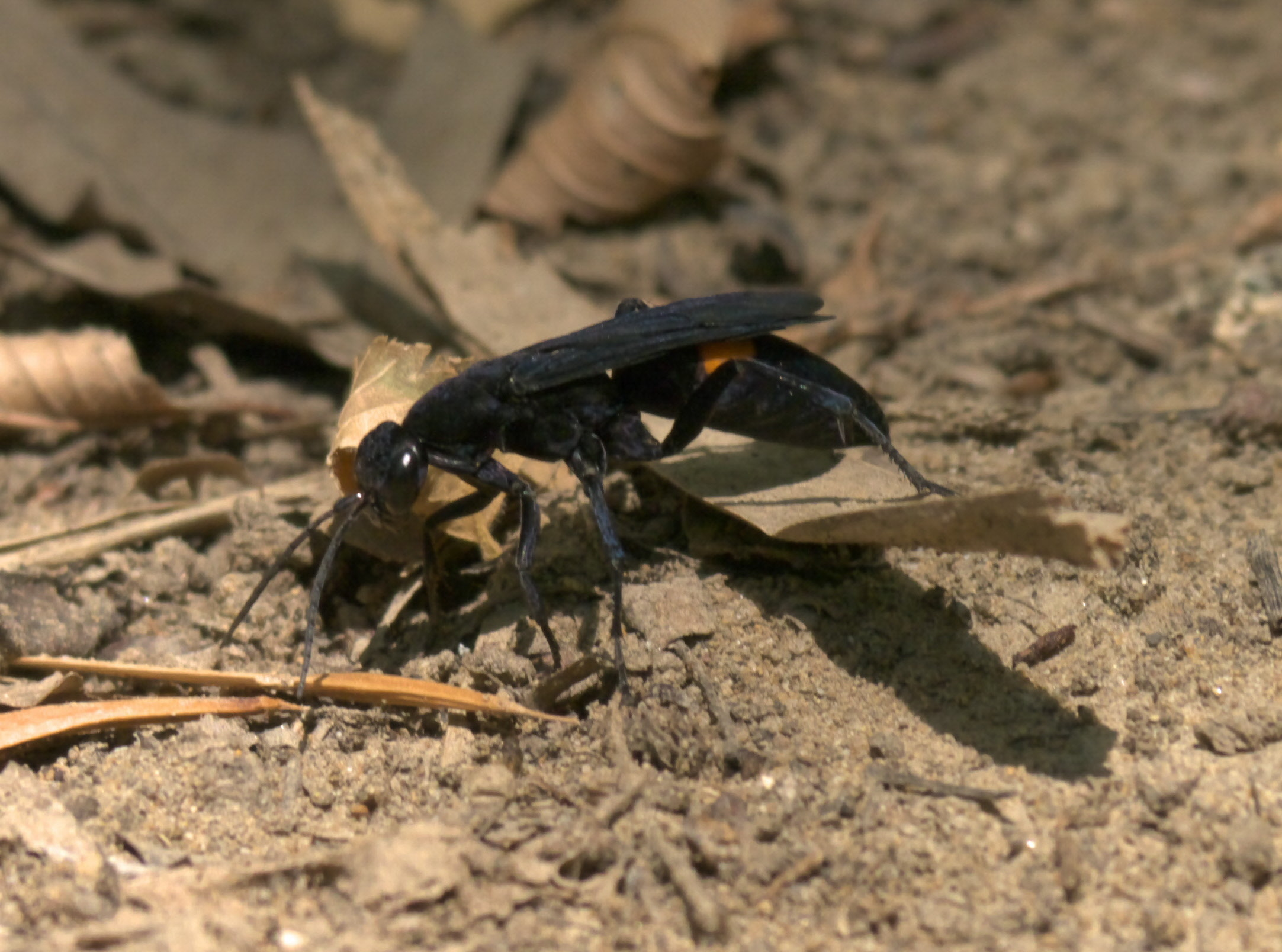
- Psorthaspis brimleyi

Scientific classification
- Domain: Eukaryota
- Kingdom: Animalia
- Phylum: Arthropoda
- Class: Insecta
- Order: Hymenoptera
- Family: Pompilidae
- Subfamily: Pompilinae
- Tribe: Aporini
- Genus: Psorthaspis; Banks, 1911

Type species
- Parapompilus laevifrons Cresson, 1872

= Psorthaspis =

Genus of spider wasps

Psorthaspis is a genus of spider wasps in the family Pompilidae. There are more than 30 described species in Psorthaspis.

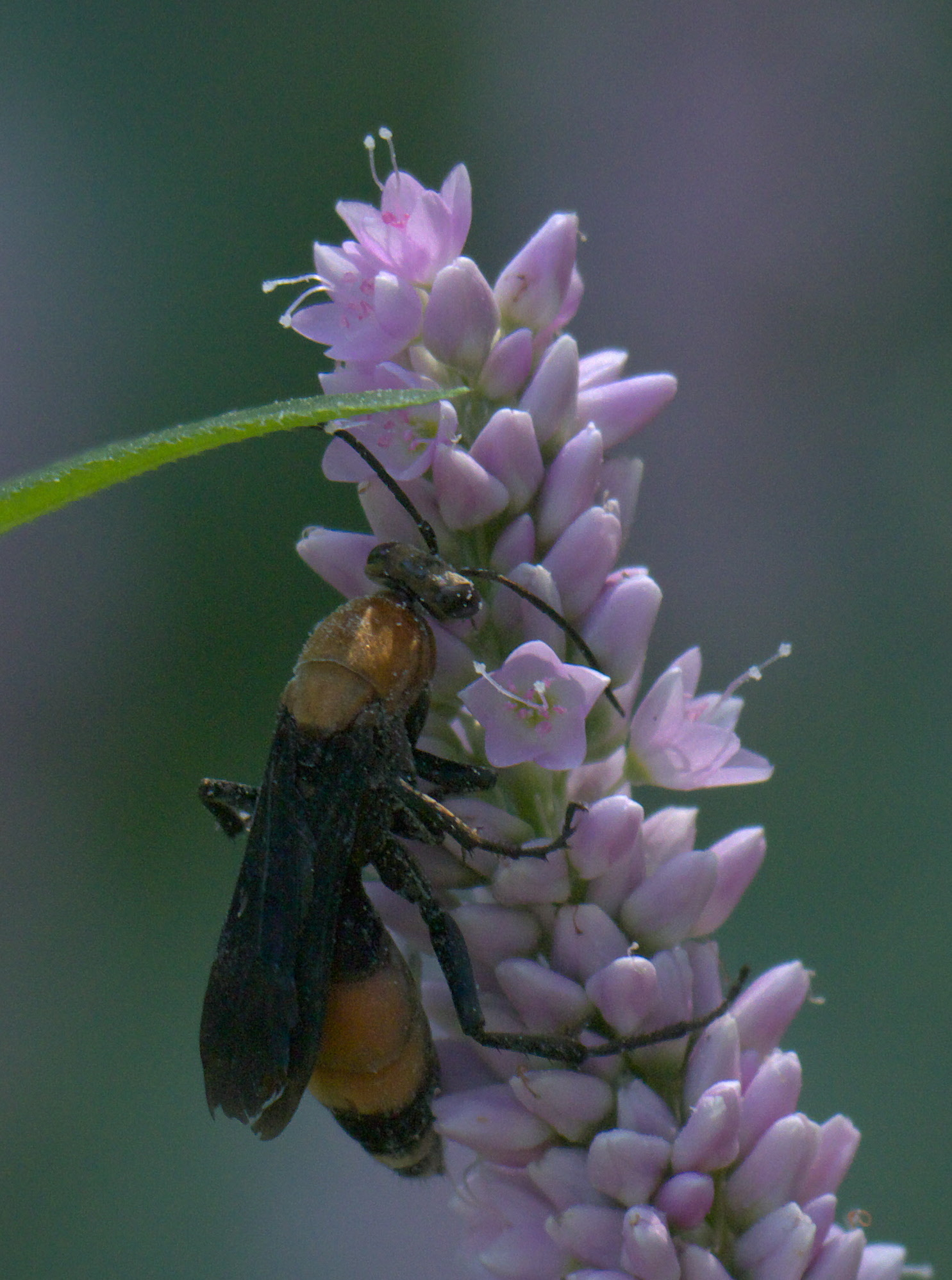
Psorthaspis sanguinea

== Species ==
These 36 species belong to the genus Psorthaspis:

- Psorthaspis alternata (Banks, 1931)
- Psorthaspis australis (Banks, 1910)
- Psorthaspis avinoffi (Banks, 1938)
- Psorthaspis banksi Bradley, 1944
- Psorthaspis bequaerti Bradley
- Psorthaspis bioculata Bradley, 1944
- Psorthaspis bradleyi Banks, 1954
- Psorthaspis brimleyi (Malloch, 1928)
- Psorthaspis canipennis Bradley, 1944
- Psorthaspis coelestis Bradley, 1944
- Psorthaspis colombiae Bradley, 1944
- Psorthaspis conocephala Bradley
- Psorthaspis elegans (Cresson, 1865)
- Psorthaspis eubule (Cameron, 1893)
- Psorthaspis formosa (Smith, 1862)
- Psorthaspis gloria Snelling, 1995
- Psorthaspis guatemalae Bradley, 1944
- Psorthaspis hispaniolae Bradley, 1944
- Psorthaspis laevifrons (Cresson, 1869)
- Psorthaspis legata (Cresson, 1867)
- Psorthaspis levis Bradley
- Psorthaspis luctuosa (Banks, 1910)
- Psorthaspis magna (Banks, 1910)
- Psorthaspis mariae (Cresson, 1867)
- Psorthaspis nahuatlensis Bradley
- Psorthaspis naomi (Smith, 1855)
- Psorthaspis nigriceps (Banks, 1933)
- Psorthaspis picta (Kohl, 1886)
- Psorthaspis planata (Fox, 1892)
- Psorthaspis portiae (Rohwer, 1920)
- Psorthaspis purpuripennis (Cresson, 1865)
- Psorthaspis regalis (Smith, 1862)
- Psorthaspis sanguinea (Smith, 1855)
- Psorthaspis texana (Cresson, 1872)
- Psorthaspis unicus (Cresson, 1867)
- Psorthaspis vicina (Cresson, 1872)
