= Mary Pocock =

South African phycologist (1886–1977)

Mary Agard Pocock
- Born: 31 December 1886; Rondebosch
- Died: 10 July 1977 (aged 90); Grahamstown, South Africa
- Education: University of London; University of Cape Town
- Scientific career
- Author abbrev. (botany): Pocock

Mary Agard Pocock (31 December 1886 – 10 July 1977) was a South African phycologist.

== Biography ==
Born in Rondebosch in 1886 to William Pocock and Elizabeth Dacomb, Mary Pocock attended Bedford High School and Cheltenham Ladies' College. Pocock then attended the University of London where she studied botany, receiving her degree in 1908. Following her degree Pocock taught at girls schools in London and the Cape before continuing her study in 1919; completing an additional honors degree in botany at Cambridge. She was a lecturer at Rhodes University for a year in 1924, a position which she took up occasionally again during her career. In 1925 she travelled with Dorothea Bleek from Rhodesia to Luanda collecting flowering plants which she studied at the Royal Botanical Gardens, Kew and the British Museum upon her return. Travelling back to South Africa, Pocock became interested in algae, obtaining a PhD on the subject from the University of Cape Town at the age of 46. In 1942 she established Rhodes University's herbarium (RUH). She studied Volvox in particular. Pocock in collaboration with Marion S. Cave became the first group to identify how many chromosomes algae have.

An author of over 30 publications on algae, a number of plants are also named after Pocock. She received the Linnean Society's Crisp Medal, and was a fellow of the Linnean Society and the Royal Society of South Africa.
