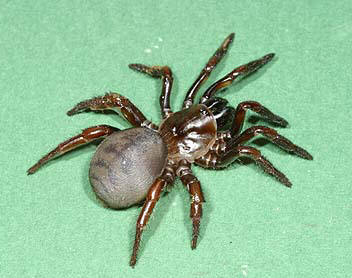
- Female Latouchia swinhoei

Scientific classification
- Kingdom: Animalia
- Phylum: Arthropoda
- Subphylum: Chelicerata
- Class: Arachnida
- Order: Araneae
- Infraorder: Mygalomorphae
- Family: Halonoproctidae
- Genus: Latouchia; Pocock, 1901

Type species
- L. davidi (Simon, 1886)

Species
- 26, see text

Synonyms
- Cronebergella Charitonov, 1946

= Latouchia =

Genus of spiders

Latouchia is a genus of Asian mygalomorph spiders in the family Halonoproctidae, first described by Reginald Innes Pocock in 1901. The genus is presumably named in honour of John David Digues La Touche (who is named as "J. de La Touche" alongside "C. B. Rickett") as co-collector of the first described species Latouchia fossoria.

Originally placed with the family Ctenizidae, the genus was moved to the Halonoproctidae in 2018.

== Species ==
As of January 2025, it contains 30 species and 1 subspecies from India to Southeast Asia:

- Latouchia bachmaensis Ono, 2010 – Vietnam
- Latouchia calcicola Hao, Yu & Zhang, 2025 – China (Hainan)
- Latouchia cornuta Song, Qiu & Zheng, 1983 – China
- Latouchia cryptica (Simon, 1897) – India
- Latouchia cunicularia (Simon, 1886) – Vietnam
- Latouchia davidi (Simon, 1886) (type) – China
- Latouchia formosensis Kishida, 1943 – Taiwan
  - Latouchia f. smithi Tso, Haupt & Zhu, 2003 – Taiwan
- Latouchia fossoria Pocock, 1901 – China
- Latouchia huberi Decae, 2019 – Vietnam
- Latouchia hunanensis Xu, Yin & Bao, 2002 – China
- Latouchia hyla Haupt & Shimojana, 2001 – Japan (Ryukyu Is.)
- Latouchia incerta Decae, Schwendinger & Hongpadharakiree, 2021 – Thailand
- Latouchia japonica Strand, 1910 – Japan
- Latouchia jinyun Hao, Yu & Zhang, 2025 – China
- Latouchia kitabensis (Charitonov, 1946) – Central Asia
- Latouchia linmufu Hao, Yu & Zhang, 2025 – China
- Latouchia maculosa Decae, Schwendinger & Hongpadharakiree, 2021 – Thailand
- Latouchia parameleomene Haupt & Shimojana, 2001 – Japan (Okinawa)
- Latouchia pavlovi Schenkel, 1953 – China
- Latouchia rufa Zhang & Wang, 2021 – China
- Latouchia schwendingeri Decae, 2019 – Vietnam
- Latouchia stridulans Decae, 2019 – Vietnam
- Latouchia swinhoei Pocock, 1901 – Japan (Ryukyu Is.)
- Latouchia typica (Kishida, 1913) – China, Japan
- Latouchia vinhiensis Schenkel, 1963 – China
- Latouchia wenchuan Hao, Yu & Zhang, 2025 – China
- Latouchia wenruni Lin & Li, 2023 – China (Hainan)
- Latouchia yaoi Hao, Yu & Zhang, 2025 – China
- Latouchia yejiei Zhang & Wang, 2021 – China (Hainan)
- Latouchia yuanjingae Lin & Li, 2022 – China (Hainan)
