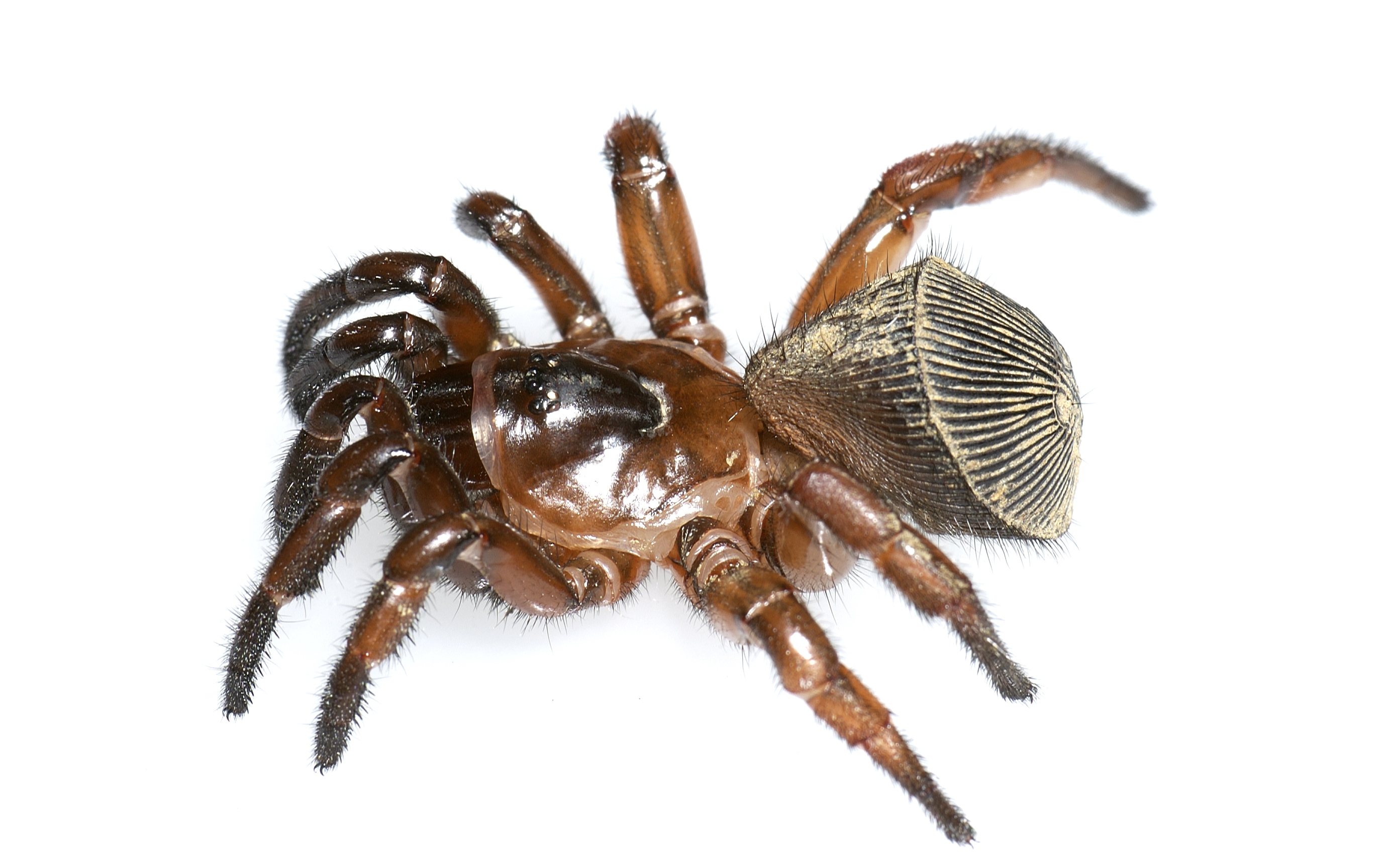

Scientific classification
- Kingdom: Animalia
- Phylum: Arthropoda
- Subphylum: Chelicerata
- Class: Arachnida
- Order: Araneae
- Infraorder: Mygalomorphae
- Family: Halonoproctidae
- Genus: Cyclocosmia
- Species: C. truncata

Binomial name
- Cyclocosmia truncata (Hentz, 1841)

= Cyclocosmia truncata =

Species of spider

Cyclocosmia truncata is a species of cork-lid trapdoor spider in the family Halonoproctidae. It is found in the United States. When threatened, Cyclocosmia truncata retreats into its burrow and uses its rigid, disc-shaped abdomen to plug the entrance, a defensive behavior known as phragmosis.

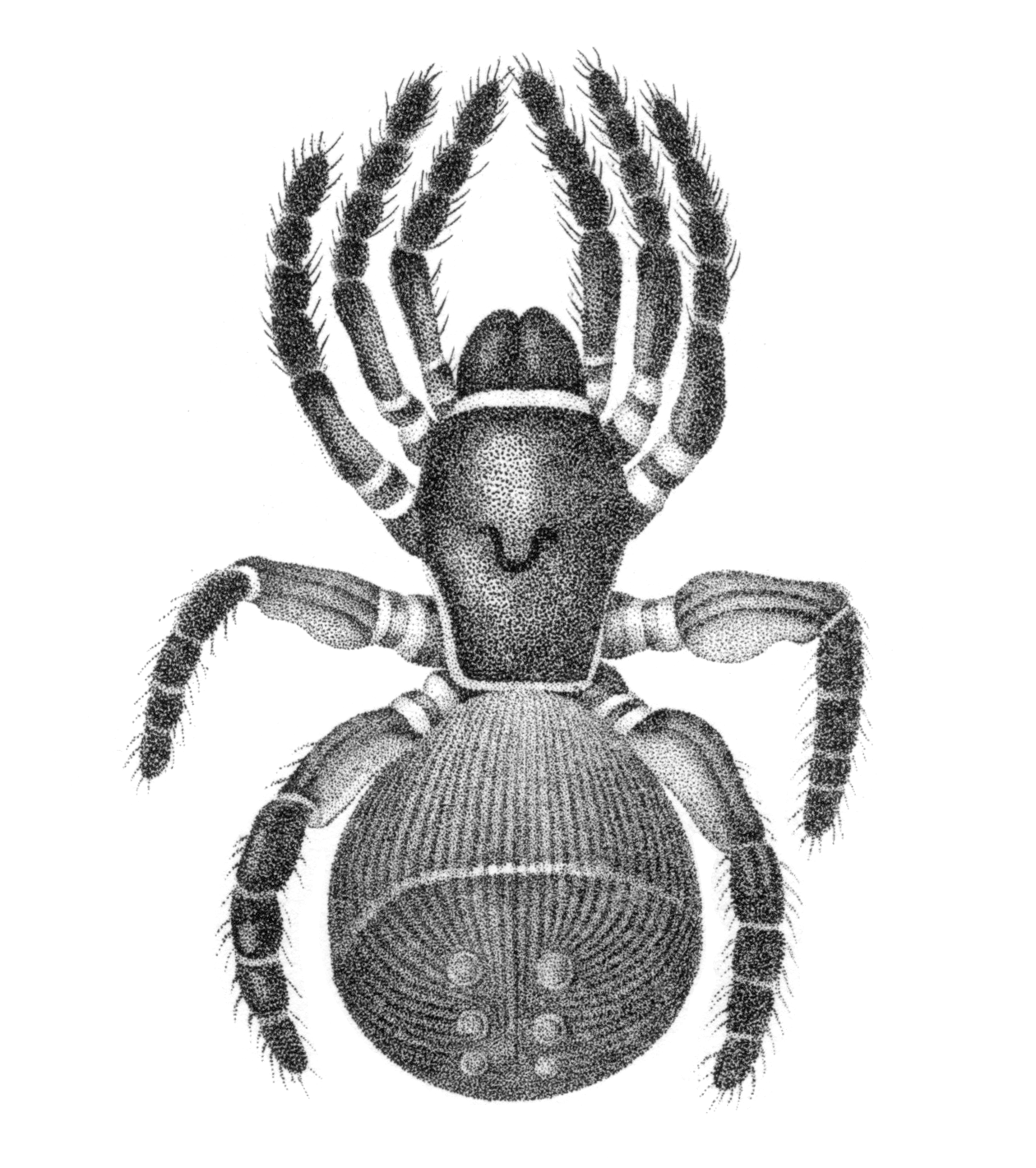
Illustration by Hentz

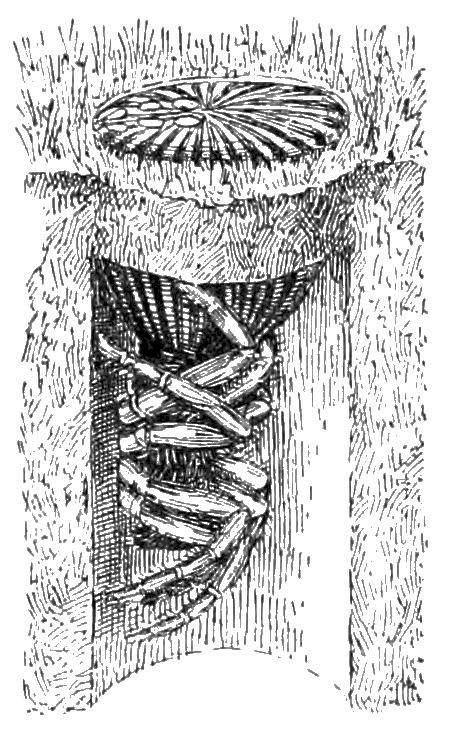
