= Ummidia picea =

Scientific classification
- Kingdom: Animalia
- Phylum: Arthropoda
- Subphylum: Chelicerata
- Class: Arachnida
- Order: Araneae
- Infraorder: Mygalomorphae
- Family: Halonoproctidae
- Genus: Ummidia
- Species: U. picea

Binomial name
- Ummidia picea Thorell, 1875

Species of spider

Ummidia picea is a spider species found in Spain.
