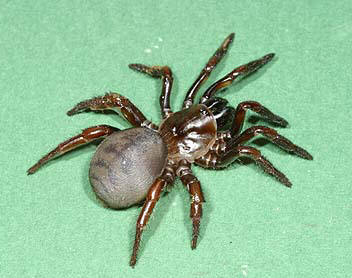
- Female

Scientific classification
- Domain: Eukaryota
- Kingdom: Animalia
- Phylum: Arthropoda
- Subphylum: Chelicerata
- Class: Arachnida
- Order: Araneae
- Infraorder: Mygalomorphae
- Family: Halonoproctidae
- Genus: Latouchia
- Species: L. swinhoei

Binomial name
- Latouchia swinhoei Pocock, 1901

= Latouchia swinhoei =

Species of spider

Latouchia swinhoei is a spider from the family Halonoproctidae found in Okinawa and the Ryukyu Islands. The spider was thriving in the locations they were found in.

== Description ==
Latouchia swinhoei are generally smaller than other trapdoor spiders, their coloration is prominently black, and as they mature, their dense black color begins to fade to a grey-brown mix. They have a pair of jaws and mandibles and eight legs, and eight eyes. The females are generally larger than the males, but the males have larger mandibles.

== Behavior ==
Latouchia swinhoei like other trapdoor spiders are docile, and hunt for prey using a burrow to hide and ambush their prey. If an insect were to walk near the premises of the burrow, it will lunge out and bites the prey and then drag it into the burrow. The spider's primary staple is any small animal that walks on the ground, such as beetles, millipedes, centipedes, worms, maggots, larvae, and most winged insects. They are also known to eat other spiders.
