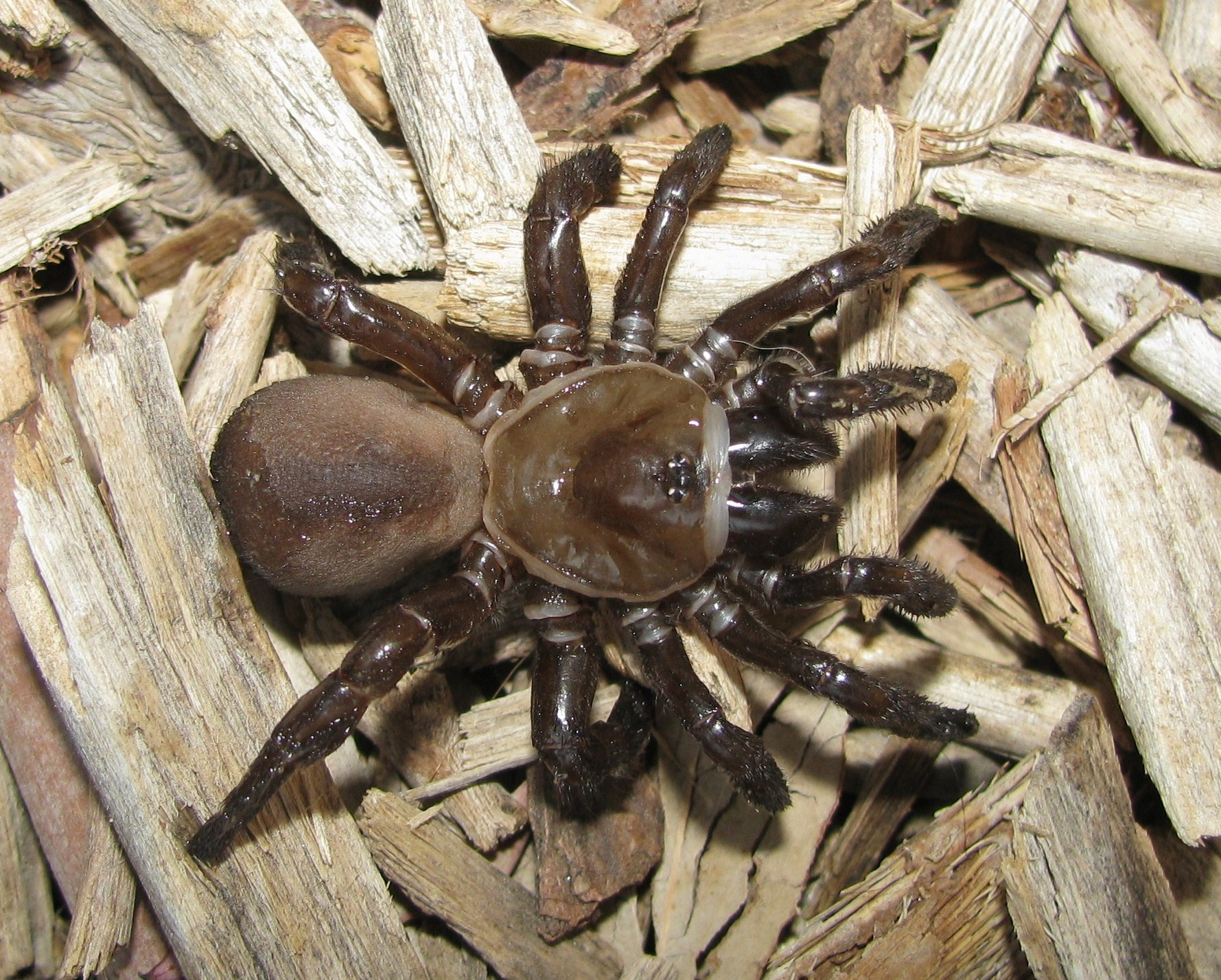

Scientific classification
- Domain: Eukaryota
- Kingdom: Animalia
- Phylum: Arthropoda
- Subphylum: Chelicerata
- Class: Arachnida
- Order: Araneae
- Infraorder: Mygalomorphae
- Family: Halonoproctidae
- Genus: Bothriocyrtum
- Species: B. californicum

Binomial name
- Bothriocyrtum californicum (O. P.-Cambridge, 1874)

= Bothriocyrtum californicum =

California trapdoor spider

Bothriocyrtum californicum, the California trapdoor spider, is a species of spider in the family Halonoproctidae. It is found in the United States. Males are smaller than females. Predators include the spider wasp Psorthaspis planata, which use their bodies as larval nurseries, and skunks, which dig up their burrows.

== Additional images ==
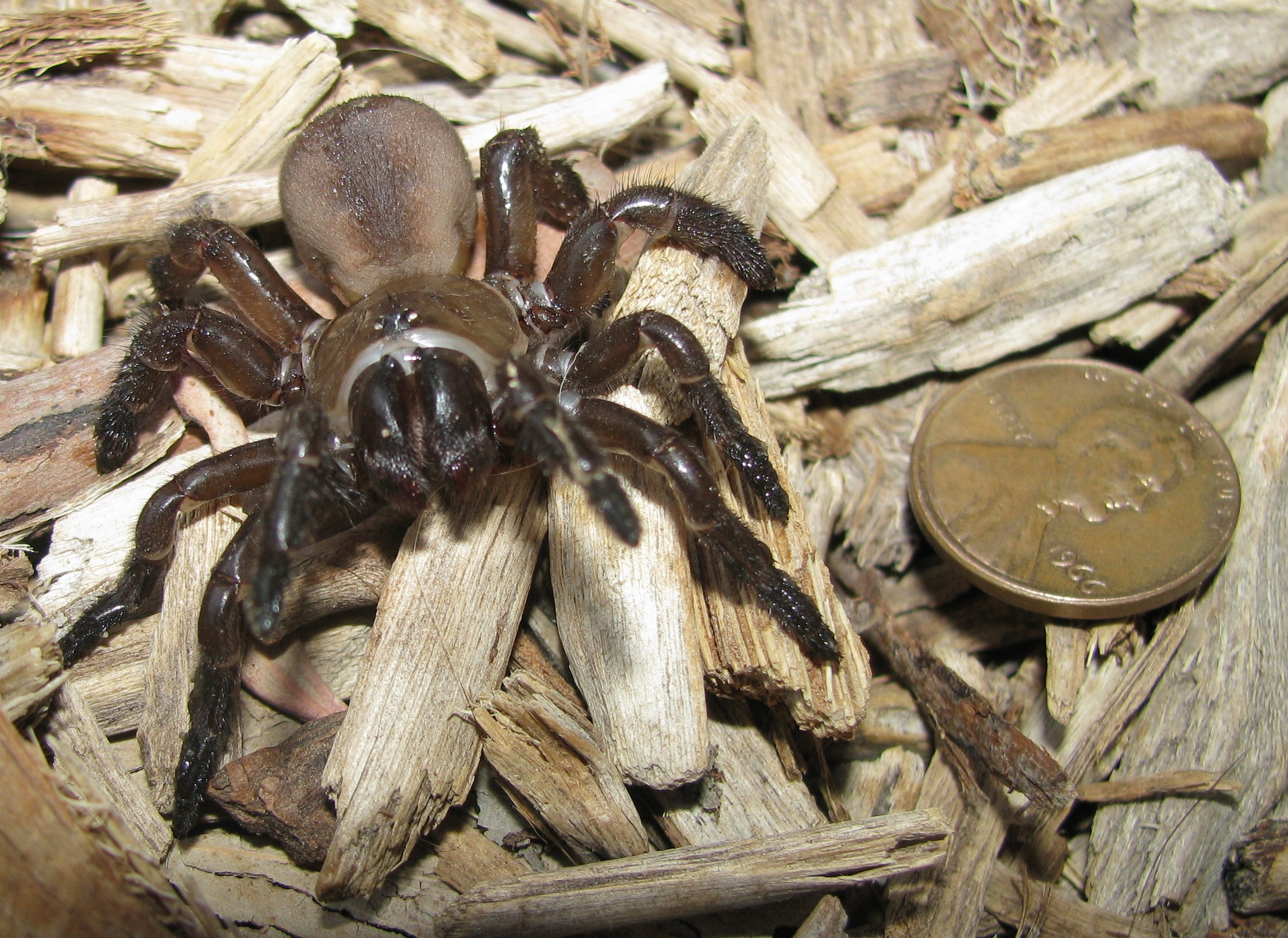
California trapdoor spider, Bothriocyrtum californicum

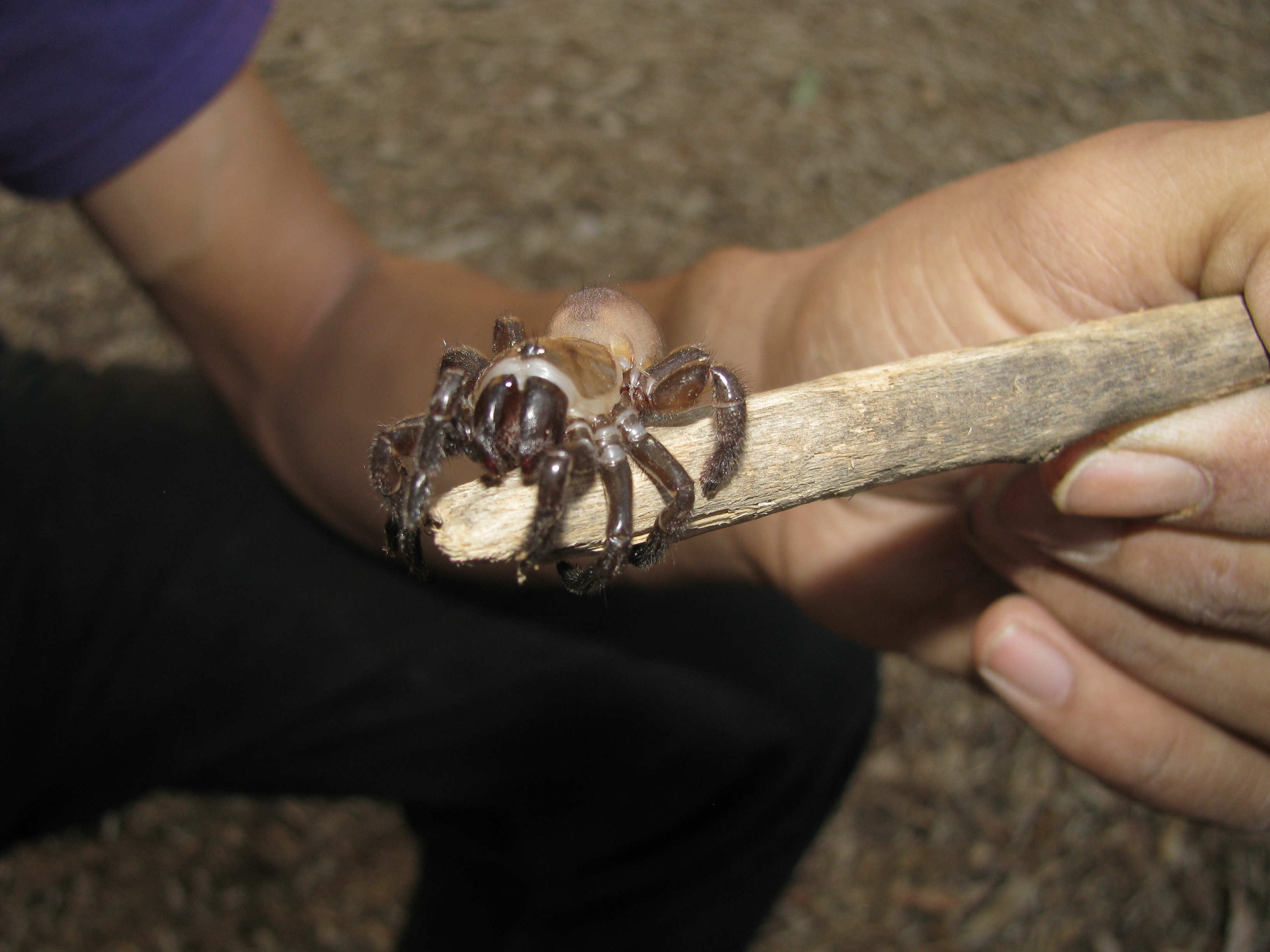
California trapdoor spider, Bothriocyrtum californicum
