= Heteromigas =

Scientific classification
- Domain: Eukaryota
- Kingdom: Animalia
- Phylum: Arthropoda
- Subphylum: Chelicerata
- Class: Arachnida
- Order: Araneae
- Infraorder: Mygalomorphae
- Family: Migidae
- Genus: Heteromigas; Hogg

Species
- Heteromigas dovei Hogg, 1902; Heteromigas terraereginae Raven, 1984

Genus of spiders

Heteromigas is a genus of spiders in the family Migidae. It was first described in 1902 by Henry Roughton Hogg. As of 2016, it contains two Australian species.
