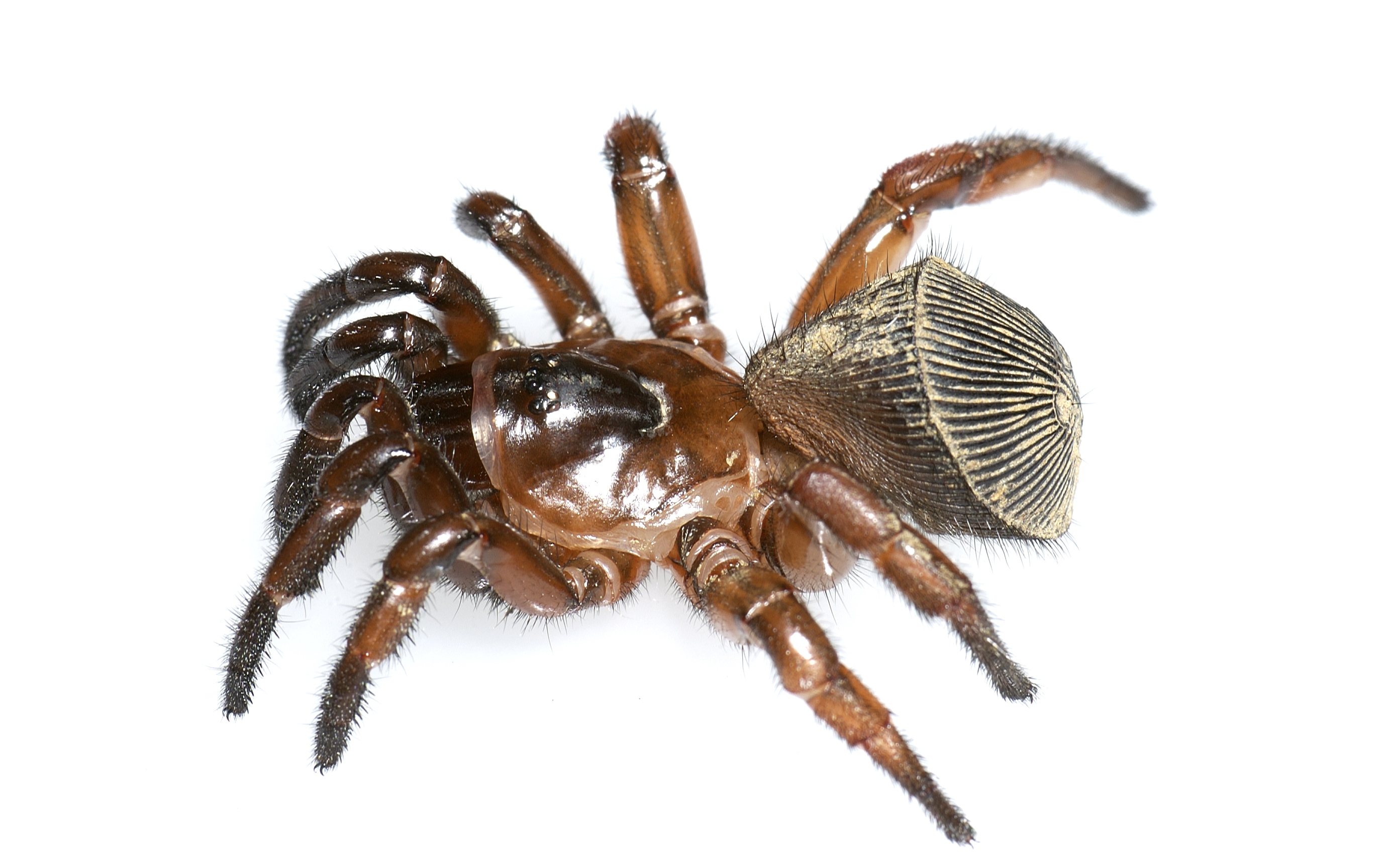
- Cyclocosmia truncata

Scientific classification
- Domain: Eukaryota
- Kingdom: Animalia
- Phylum: Arthropoda
- Subphylum: Chelicerata
- Class: Arachnida
- Order: Araneae
- Infraorder: Mygalomorphae
- Family: Halonoproctidae
- Genus: Cyclocosmia; Ausserer, 1871

Type species
- C. truncata (Hentz, 1841)

Species
- 13, see text

Synonyms
- Chorizops Ausserer, 1871; Halonoproctus Pocock, 1901

= Cyclocosmia =

Genus of spiders

Cyclocosmia is a genus of mygalomorph trapdoor spiders in the family Halonoproctidae, first described by Anton Ausserer in 1871. Originally placed with the Ctenizidae, when the family split in 2018, this genus was placed with the Halonoproctidae as the type genus. The name is derived from the Greek "kyklos" (κυκλος), meaning "circle", and "kosmeo" (κοσμεω), meaning "to adorn".

== Description ==
These are trapdoor spiders, whose species are distinguished from each other by the pattern of the abdominal disk, the number of hairs on its seam, and the shape of the spermathecae. They have abdomens that are abruptly truncated, ending in a hardened disc that is strengthened by a system of ribs and grooves. They use this to clog the entrance of their burrows when threatened, a phenomenon called phragmosis. The disks have strong spines around the edge, and they each have four spinnerets just anterior to it. The posterior, retractable spinnerets are particularly large.

C. ricketti females are 28 millimetres (1.1 in) long, with a disk diameter of 16 millimetres (0.63 in). Their burrows are 7 to 15 centimetres (2.8 to 5.9 in) deep, and only the bottom portion of the burrow is silk lined.

== Species ==
As of 2025, it contains thirteen species:

- Cyclocosmia abramovi Sherwood, 2024 – Vietnam
- Cyclocosmia johndenveri Sherwood, Warhol & Bianco, 2025 – USA
- Cyclocosmia lannaensis Schwendinger, 2005 – China, Thailand
- Cyclocosmia latusicosta Zhu, Zhang & Zhang, 2006 – China, Vietnam
- Cyclocosmia liui Xu, Xu & Li, 2017 – China
- Cyclocosmia loricata (C. L. Koch, 1842) – Mexico
- Cyclocosmia ricketti (Pocock, 1901) – China
- Cyclocosmia ruyi Yu & F. Zhang, 2023 – China
- Cyclocosmia siamensis Schwendinger, 2005 – Thailand, Laos
- Cyclocosmia sublatusicosta Yu & Zhang, 2018 – China
- Cyclocosmia subricketti Yu & Zhang, 2018 – China
- Cyclocosmia torreya Gertsch & Platnick, 1975 – USA
- Cyclocosmia truncata (Hentz, 1841) (type) – USA
