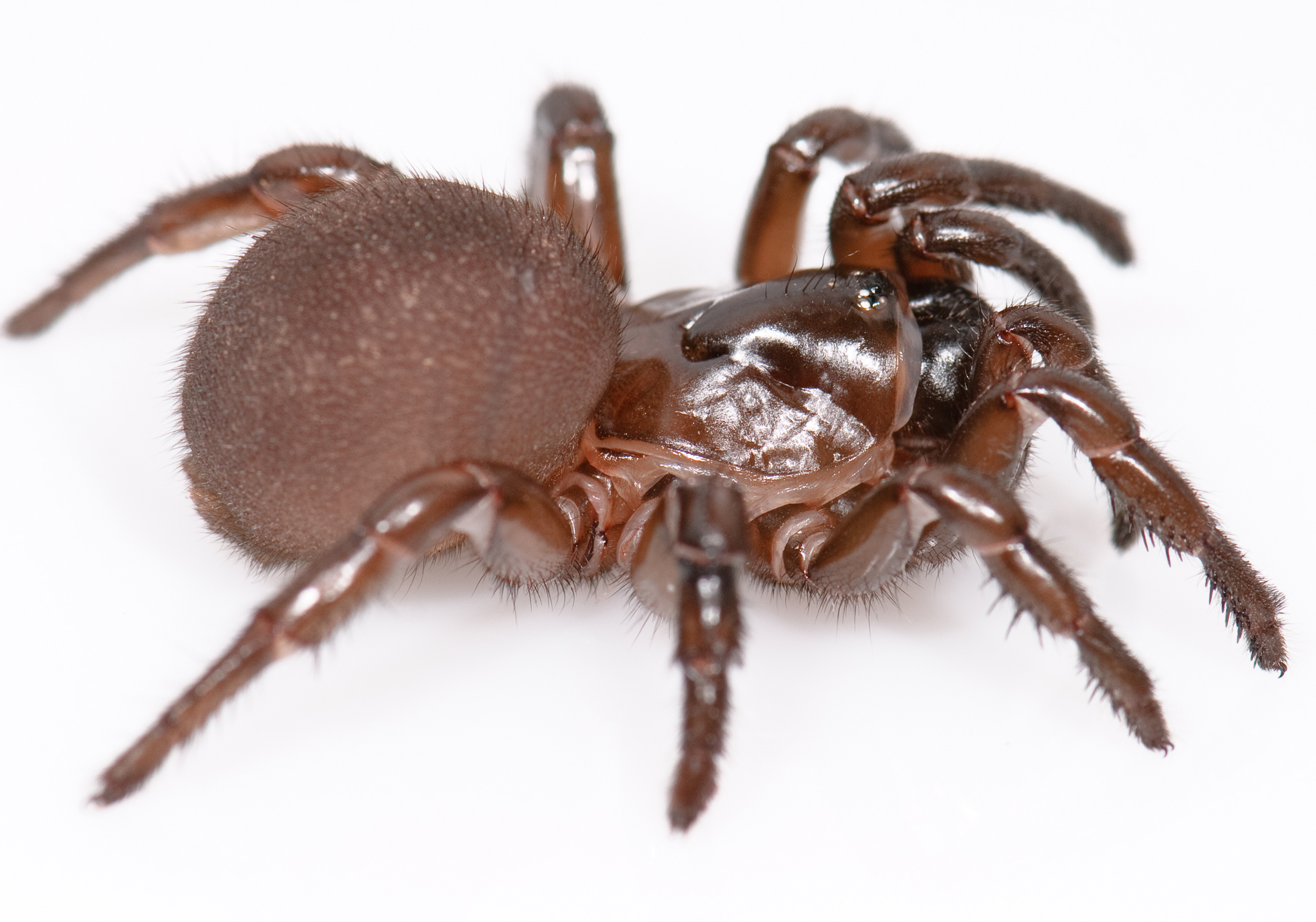
- Hebestatis theveneti

Scientific classification
- Kingdom: Animalia
- Phylum: Arthropoda
- Subphylum: Chelicerata
- Class: Arachnida
- Order: Araneae
- Infraorder: Mygalomorphae
- Family: Halonoproctidae
- Genus: Hebestatis; Simon, 1903

Type species
- H. theveneti (Simon, 1891)

Species
- H. theveneti (Simon, 1891) – USA

= Hebestatis =

Genus of spiders

Hebestatis is a genus of mygalomorph spiders in the family Halonoproctidae, first described by Eugène Simon in 1903. As of April 2021 it contains only 1 species: H. theveneti.
