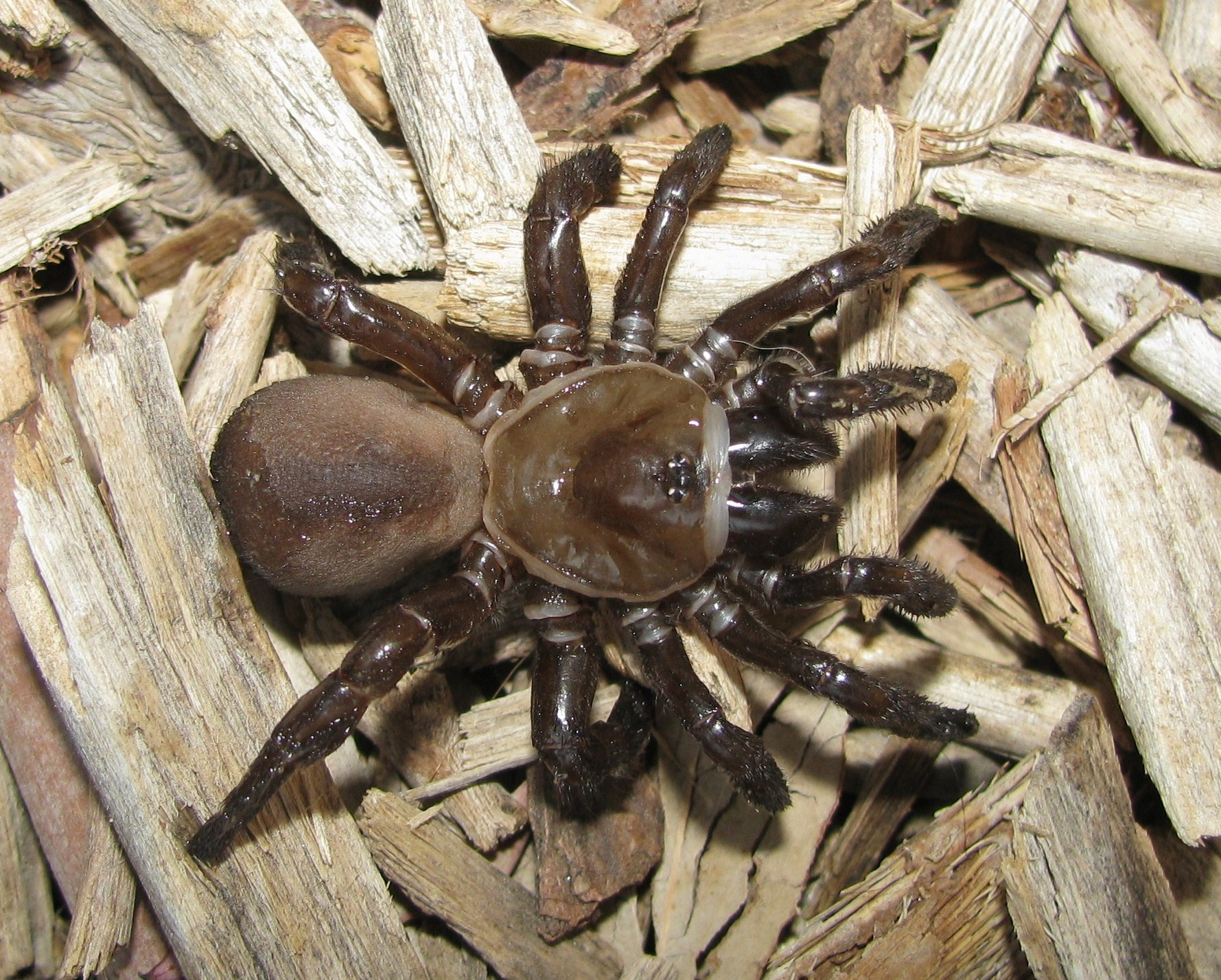
- Bothriocyrtum californicum

Scientific classification
- Domain: Eukaryota
- Kingdom: Animalia
- Phylum: Arthropoda
- Subphylum: Chelicerata
- Class: Arachnida
- Order: Araneae
- Infraorder: Mygalomorphae
- Family: Halonoproctidae
- Genus: Bothriocyrtum; Simon, 1891

Type species
- B. californicum (O. Pickard-Cambridge, 1874)

Species
- B. californicum (O. Pickard-Cambridge, 1874) – USA; B. fabrile Simon, 1891 – Mexico; B. tractabile Saito, 1933 – Taiwan

= Bothriocyrtum =

Genus of spiders

Bothriocyrtum is a genus of mygalomorph spiders in the family Halonoproctidae, first described by Eugène Simon in 1891. They are native to Mexico, Taiwan, and the southern United States. It was separated from Cyrtocarenum in 1891 for several reasons, including an increased width of separation and a distinctly different arrangement of the eyes. As of April 2019 it contains only three species: B. californicum, B. fabrile, and B. tractabile.
