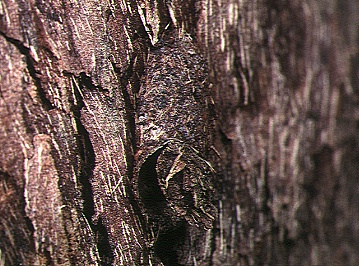
- C. fragaria

Scientific classification
- Kingdom: Animalia
- Phylum: Arthropoda
- Subphylum: Chelicerata
- Class: Arachnida
- Order: Araneae
- Infraorder: Mygalomorphae
- Family: Halonoproctidae
- Genus: Conothele; Thorell, 1878

Type species
- C. malayana (Doleschall, 1859)

Species
- 35, see text

Synonyms
- Lechrictenus

= Conothele =

Genus of spiders

Conothele is a genus of mygalomorph spiders in the family Halonoproctidae, first described by Tamerlan Thorell in 1878. Originally placed with the Ctenizidae, it was moved to the Halonoproctidae in 2018.

== Species ==
As of September 2025 it contains 38 species:

- Conothele arboricola Pocock, 1899 – Papua New Guinea (New Britain)
- Conothele baisha H. Liu, Xu, Zhang, F. Liu & Li, 2019 – China (Hainan)
- Conothele baiyunensis X. Xu, C. Xu & Liu, 2017 – China
- Conothele baoting H. Liu, Xu, Zhang, F. Liu & Li, 2019 – China (Hainan)
- Conothele birmanica Thorell, 1887 – Myanmar
- Conothele cambridgei Thorell, 1890 – Indonesia (Sumatra)
- Conothele cangshan Yang & Xu, 2018 – China
- Conothele chinnarensis Sunil Jose, 2021 – India
- Conothele daxinensis X. Xu, C. Xu & Liu, 2017 – China
- Conothele deqin Yang & Xu, 2018 – China
- Conothele doleschalli Thorell, 1881 – Australia (Queensland)
- Conothele ferox Strand, 1913 – New Guinea
- Conothele fragaria (Dönitz, 1887) – Japan
- Conothele giganticus Siliwal & Raven, 2015 – India
- Conothele gressitti (Roewer, 1963) – Micronesia
- Conothele hebredisiana Berland, 1938 – Vanuatu
- Conothele isan Decae, Schwendinger & Hongpadharakiree, 2021 – Thailand
- Conothele jinggangshan H. Liu, Xu, Zhang, F. Liu & Li, 2019 – China
- Conothele khunthokhanbi Kananbala, Bhubaneshwari & Siliwal, 2015 – India
- Conothele lampra (Chamberlin, 1917) – USA?
- Conothele limatior Kulczyński, 1908 – New Guinea
- Conothele linzhi H. Liu, Xu, Zhang, F. Liu & Li, 2019 – China
- Conothele maculosa Yu, Yang & Zhang, 2024 – China
- Conothele malayana (Doleschall, 1859) (type) – Indonesia (Moluccas), New Guinea, Australia
- Conothele martensi Decae, Schwendinger & Hongpadharakiree, 2021 – Thailand
- Conothele medoga Zhang & Yu, 2021 – China
- Conothele mussoorie Tripathi & Kadam, 2025 – India
- Conothele nigriceps Pocock, 1898 – Solomon Is.
- Conothele ogalei Sanap, Pawar, Joglekar & Khandekar, 2022 – India
- Conothele purvaghati Mirza, 2022 – India
- Conothele sidiechongensis X. Xu, C. Xu & Liu, 2017 – China, Laos
- Conothele spinosa Hogg, 1914 – New Guinea
- Conothele taiwanensis (Tso, Haupt & Zhu, 2003) – Taiwan
- Conothele trachypus Kulczyński, 1908 – Papua New Guinea (New Britain)
- Conothele truncicola Saaristo, 2002 – Seychelles
- Conothele vali Siliwal, Nair, Molur & Raven, 2009 – India
- Conothele varvarti Siliwal, Nair, Molur & Raven, 2009 – India
- Conothele yundingensis X. Xu, C. Xu & Liu, 2017 – China
