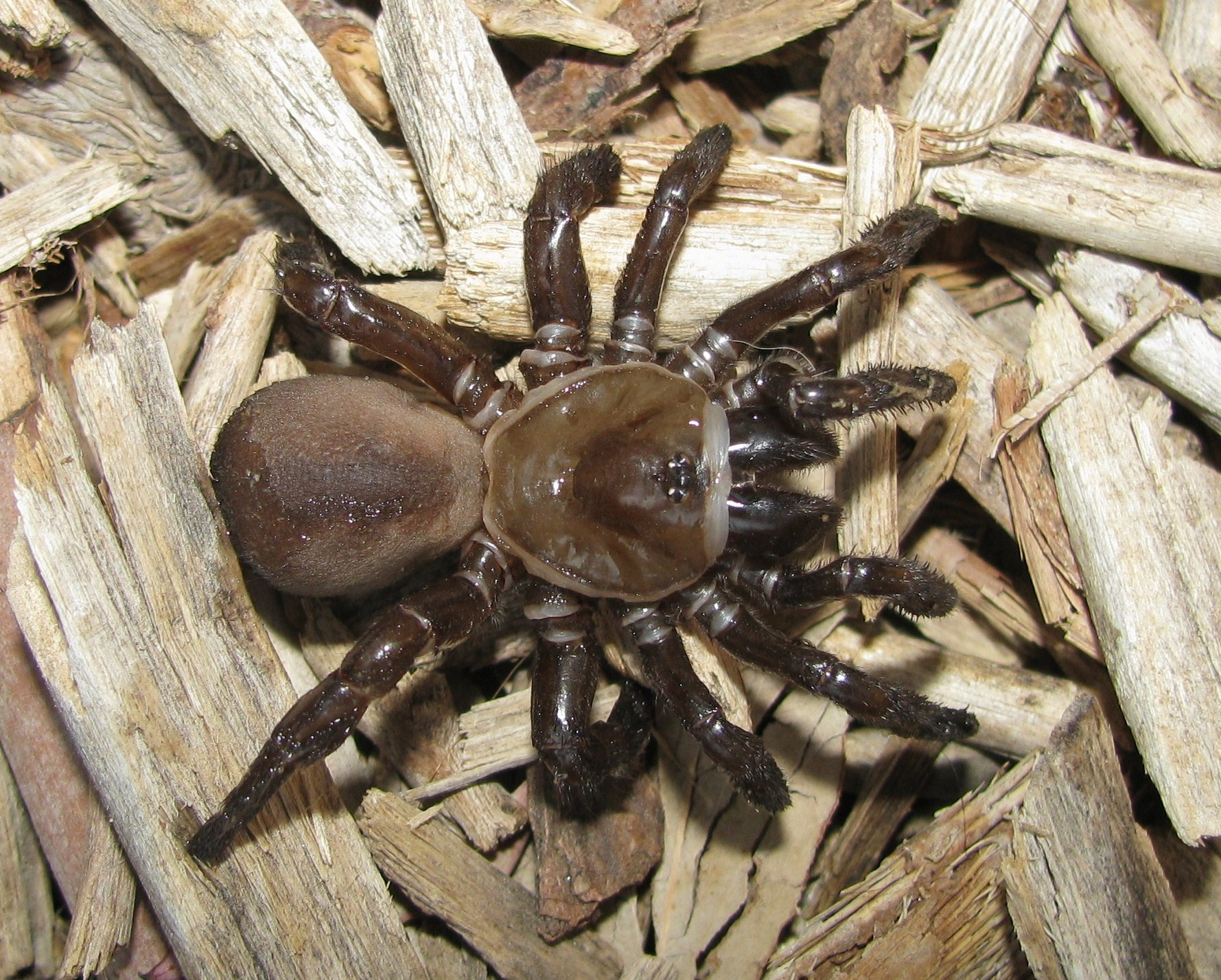
- Bothriocyrtum californicum
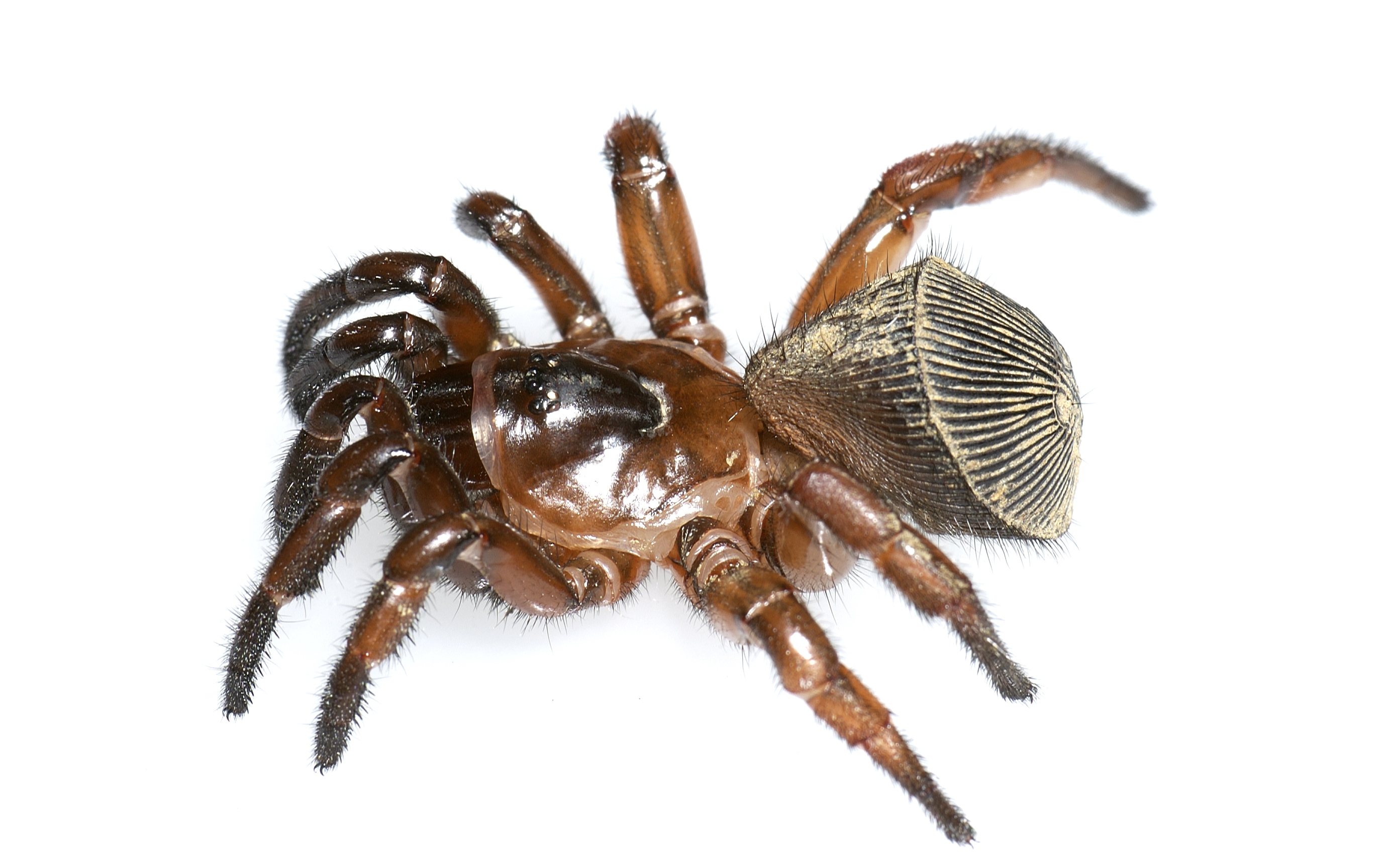
- Cyclocosmia truncata

Scientific classification
- Kingdom: Animalia
- Phylum: Arthropoda
- Subphylum: Chelicerata
- Class: Arachnida
- Order: Araneae
- Infraorder: Mygalomorphae
- Clade: Avicularioidea
- Family: Halonoproctidae; Pocock, 1901

Diversity
- 6 genera, 145 species
- blue: reported countries (WSC) green: observation hotspots (iNaturalist)

= Halonoproctidae =

Family of spiders

Halonoproctidae is a family of mygalomorph spiders, split off from the family Ctenizidae in 2018. Species in the family are widely distributed in North and Central America, Australasia, Asia, southern Europe and North Africa. One species is recorded from Venezuela in South America. They are relatively large, sombrely coloured spiders, that live in burrows with some kind of trapdoor.

== Distribution ==
Species in the family Halonoproctidae have been recorded from western and eastern North and Central America and the Caribbean, with one species, Ummidia asperula, found in Venezuela in South America; on either side of the Mediterranean in southern Europe and northwestern Africa; in eastern Asia; and in Australasia.

== Description ==
Spiders of the family Halonoproctidae are of a medium to large size for spiders. They construct burrows with some kind of trapdoor, either wafer-like or cork-like. They range in colour from light brown to black, usually without any strongly distinctive body markings. The carapace is usually without hairs and has only a few spines. The sternum is longer than it is wide, and has sigillae at least in the posterior part. The eyes are arranged in two or three rows. Females do not have scopulae on their legs, but do have unique curved, thornlike spines on the sides of legs I and II. Males have scopulae on the tarsi of at least some legs, often all. Their anterior legs have prominent spines and projections on the distal segments; their posterior legs have larger spines. Two pairs of spinnerets are present: the posterior median pair being short and unsegmented, the posterior lateral pair are longer, but still short, and have three segments, the apical one being the shortest. The female spermathecae have a single lobe. The male palpal bulb has a thin embolus, and is borne on a spineless cymbium.

== Taxonomy ==
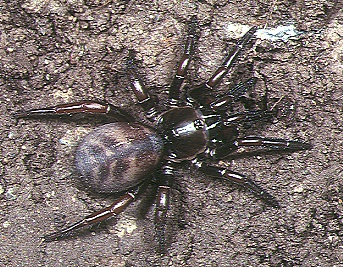
Latouchia swinhoei

The group was first described by R. I. Pocock in 1901, as the subfamily Halonoproctinae of the family Ctenizidae. The subfamily was named after the genus Halonoproctus which Pocock erected at the same time. Halonoproctus is now considered to be a junior synonym of Cyclocosmia, but this does not alter the priority of the name Halonoproctinae. Studies of the Ctenizidae using molecular phylogenetic approaches from 2006 onwards repeatedly found the family to be either paraphyletic or polyphyletic, but did not include all the genera placed in the family. A 2018 study that did include all nine genera found that six genera, including Cyclocosmia, formed a monophyletic group, and so elevated Pocock's subfamily to the family Halonoproctidae. The status of the remaining three genera of the original Ctenizidae remained unclear. In the cladogram below, they are shaded in yellow.

- - Stasimopus
  - - - Heteromigas (Migidae)
      - - Idiops (Idiopidae)
        - - Myrmekiaphila (Euctenizidae)
          - - Cteniza
            - Cyrtocarenum
    - Halonoproctidae
      - Halonoproctinae
        - Cyclocosmia
        - - Bothriocyrtum
          - Hebestatis
      - Ummidiinae
        - Latouchia
        - - Conothele
          - Ummidia

=== Genera ===
As of October 2025, this family includes six genera and 145 species in two subfamilies:

- Halonoproctinae Pocock 1901
  - Bothriocyrtum Simon, 1891 – Taiwan, Mexico, United States
  - Cyclocosmia Ausserer, 1871 – China, Laos, Thailand, Vietnam, Mexico, United States
  - Hebestatis Simon, 1903 – United States
- Ummidiinae Ortiz, 2007
  - Conothele Thorell, 1878 – Seychelles, Asia, United States?, Australia, Melanesia
  - Latouchia Pocock, 1901 – China, Japan, Taiwan, Thailand, Vietnam, India
  - Ummidia Thorell, 1875 – Algeria, Morocco, Tunisia, Afghanistan, Tajikistan, Portugal, Spain, North America, South America, West Indies
