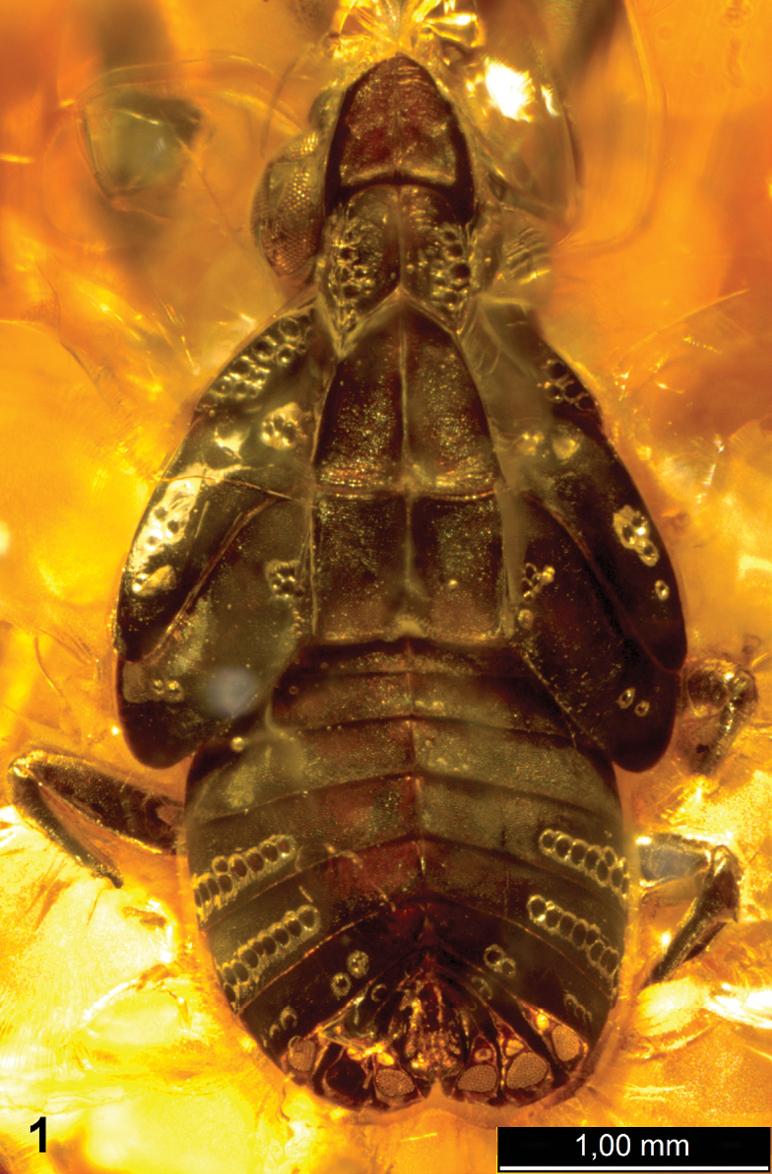
- Holotype 4th instar nymph

Scientific classification
- Domain: Eukaryota
- Kingdom: Animalia
- Phylum: Arthropoda
- Class: Insecta
- Order: Hemiptera
- Suborder: Auchenorrhyncha
- Infraorder: Fulgoromorpha
- Family: Dictyopharidae
- Genus: †Alicodoxa; Emeljanov and Shcherbakov, 2011
- Species: †A. rasnitsyni

Binomial name
- †Alicodoxa rasnitsyni Emeljanov & Shcherbakov, 2011

= Alicodoxa =

Alicodoxa Temporal range: Middle Eocene – Late Eocene

Extinct genus of true bugs

Alicodoxa is a genus of extinct planthoppers in the family Dictyopharidae. It contains a single described species, Alicodoxa rasnitsyni, known from several Late Eocene fossils found in Europe.

== History and classification ==
Alicodoxa is known from several fossil specimens of third and fourth instar nymphs. The holotype nymph was first identified from an inclusion in a transparent chunk of Rovno amber found in Ukraine, and two other nymphs have been found in Baltic amber, the genus being one of a number of arthropods shared between the two amber deposits. The Rovno amber inclusion was recovered from amber mining operations in the Klesov area working Late Eocene sediments of the Mezhigorje Formation and underlying Obukhov Formation which cover granite basement rock of the area. Baltic amber has very similar chemical and physical properties to Rovno amber, both ambers possibly being produced by the same forest. The ages of the two ambers differ, with the most common age for Baltic amber being Lutetian, slightly older than the Rovno amber, though both are redistributed into younger sediments and so the absolute age is uncertain.

Both the Baltic amber nymphs were originally figured in earlier publications as other taxa. One was first pictured in 1998 labeled as a third instar nymph. The other specimen was first illustrated in 1856 as a third instar nymph of "Pseudophana reticulata", a species now placed in the genus Protepiptera.

The Rovno amber specimen was first studied by Russian entomologists Alexander Emeljanov and Dmitry Shcherbakov, with their 2016 type description for the genus and species being published in the journal ZooKeys. The genus and specific epithet were coined as patronyms honoring Russian paleoentomologist Alexandr Rasnitsyn, the genus name Alicodoxa being formed from Alexandr and the species name rasnitsyni from Rasnitsyn.

== Description ==
The holotype nymph is 4.1 mm (0.16 in) long and 2.2 mm (0.087 in) at the widest, with a generally ovoid outline. The exoskeleton is a dark brown color, with patches of shagreened texturing along the upper surfaces. The head extends beyond the oval outline of the body, with the rostrum folded under the body and reaching to just past the coxae of the hind legs. The pronotum is modified in outline, with 2/3 of its middle length placed between the eyes and the front edge is nearly straight. The rear section is divided into two lobes spreading away from each other to the sides with the lobes converging 1/3 of the pronotal length from the rear. Raised ridges run along the full border of the pronotum with varying degrees of development; the area where the lobes join the central mass show very little ridging, while the free margins of the pronotum have well-developed ridges. There are a number of sensory pits on the upper surface and sides of the pronotum. Seven sensory pits are present on the pectoral area of each side, and four pits are developed in the humeral area. Along the upper surface there are rows totaling between nineteen and twenty-one sensory pits. Behind the pronotum, the mesonotum has an arrowhead shaped outline, bracketed by the forewing pads. The front edges are raised ridges and run parallel to the rear inside margin of the pronotum. Along each side margin are groups of six to seven sensory pits ranging in size. The wing pads are nearly parallel to each other, with the fore wing pads overlaying the hind wing pads. There are six sensor pits on the fore wing pads and only two on the hind wing pads. The abdomen has a ridge running down the center from the pronotum to the tip, and poorly developed side ridges present on tergites 4 and 5. There are rows of pits on the upper surfaces of tergites 4 to 9 ranging in number from 3 to 8 pits per tergite. On the rear faces tergites 6 to 8 there are pairs of circular wax plates covering wax gland pores, with a large central plate and a smaller upper plate. Each of the wax pores is surrounded by ridges, and the smaller upper plate of tergite 7 is divided in half by a chitinous bridge.
