= Pachycoleus =

Scientific classification
- Domain: Eukaryota
- Kingdom: Animalia
- Phylum: Arthropoda
- Class: Insecta
- Order: Hemiptera
- Suborder: Heteroptera
- Infraorder: Dipsocoromorpha
- Family: Dipsocoridae
- Genus: Pachycoleus; Fieber, 1860

Genus of true bugs

Pachycoleus is a genus of bugs in the family Dipsocoridae, erected by Franz Xaver Fieber in 1860. The type species Pachycoleus waltli is recorded from northern Europe including the British Isles. (Note: "Pachycoleus alienum" is now placed in the genus Cryptostemma)

== Species ==
According to BioLib the following are included:

1. Pachycoleus dogueti Péricart & Matocq, 2004
2. Pachycoleus gracilis (Josifov, 1967)
3. Pachycoleus japonicus (Miyamoto, 1964)
4. Pachycoleus pusillimum (J. Sahlberg, 1870)
5. Pachycoleus utnapishtim Linnavuori, 1984
6. Pachycoleus waltli Fieber, 1860 - type species

== See also ==
- List of heteropteran bugs recorded in Britain
