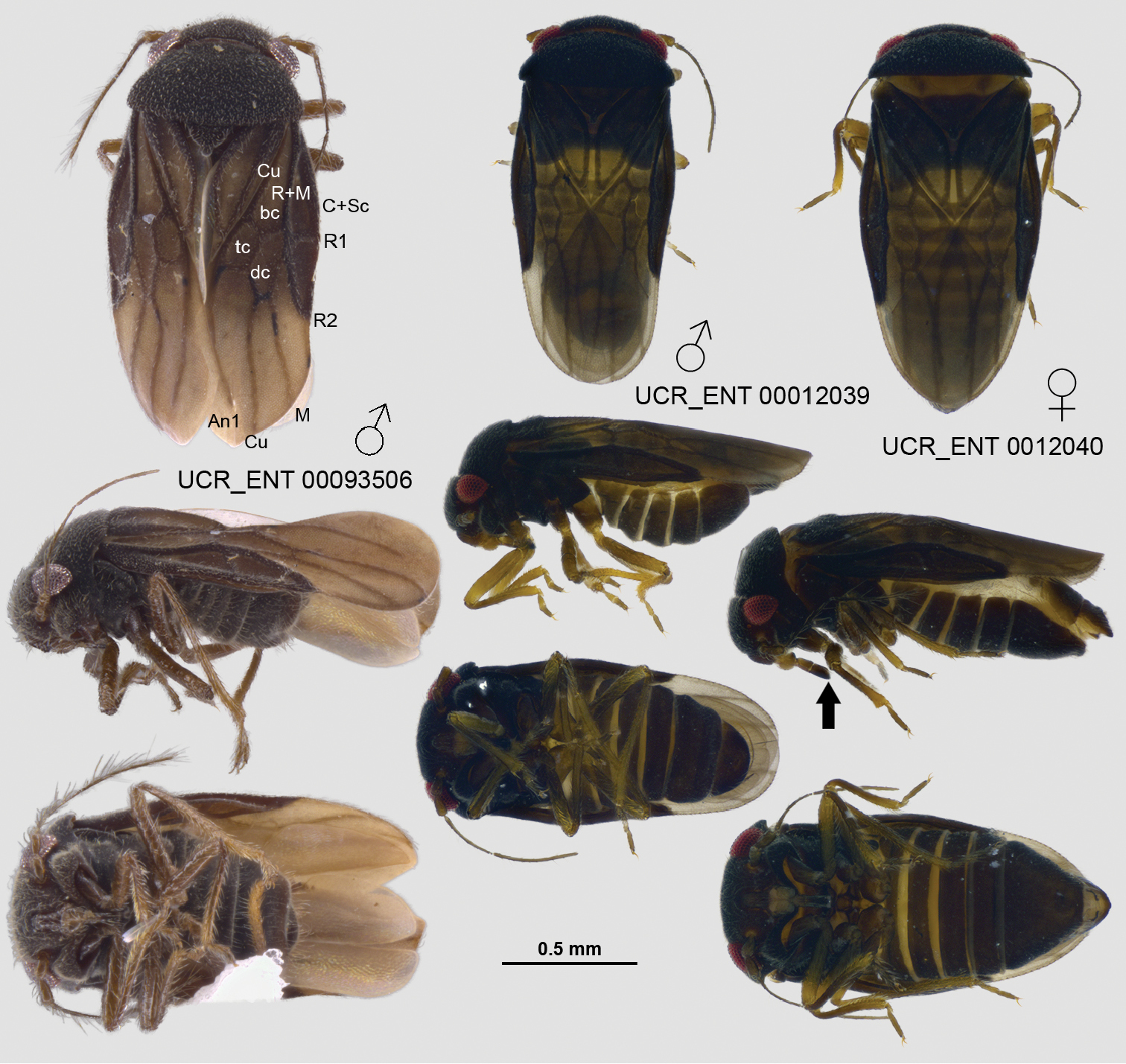
- Habitus images of male and female Corixidea major in dorsal, lateral, and ventral view. UCR_ENT 00093506 shows a dry, point-mounted specimen; the other two specimens are ethanol-preserved.

Scientific classification
- Domain: Eukaryota
- Kingdom: Animalia
- Phylum: Arthropoda
- Class: Insecta
- Order: Hemiptera
- Suborder: Heteroptera
- Family: Schizopteridae
- Genus: Corixidea
- Species: C. major

Binomial name
- Corixidea major Mcatee & Malloch, 1925

= Corixidea major =

Species of true bug

Corixidea major is a species of jumping soil bug in the family Schizopteridae. It is found in North America.
