= Ceratocombus vagans =

Scientific classification
- Domain: Eukaryota
- Kingdom: Animalia
- Phylum: Arthropoda
- Class: Insecta
- Order: Hemiptera
- Suborder: Heteroptera
- Family: Ceratocombidae
- Genus: Ceratocombus
- Species: C. vagans

Binomial name
- Ceratocombus vagans Mcatee & Malloch, 1925

Species of true bug

Ceratocombus vagans is a species of litter bug in the family Ceratocombidae. It is found in Central America and North America.
