= Glipostena ponomarenkoi =

Scientific classification
- Domain: Eukaryota
- Kingdom: Animalia
- Phylum: Arthropoda
- Class: Insecta
- Order: Coleoptera
- Suborder: Polyphaga
- Infraorder: Cucujiformia
- Family: Mordellidae
- Subfamily: Mordellinae
- Tribe: Mordellistenini
- Genus: Glipostena
- Species: G. ponomarenkoi

Binomial name
- Glipostena ponomarenkoi Odnosum & Perkovsky, 2009

Extinct species of beetle

Glipostena ponomarenkoi is an extinct species of beetle in the genus Glipostena. The species was described from the late Eocene Rovno amber of Ukraine in 2009.
