= Malynsk =

Malynsk Малинськ
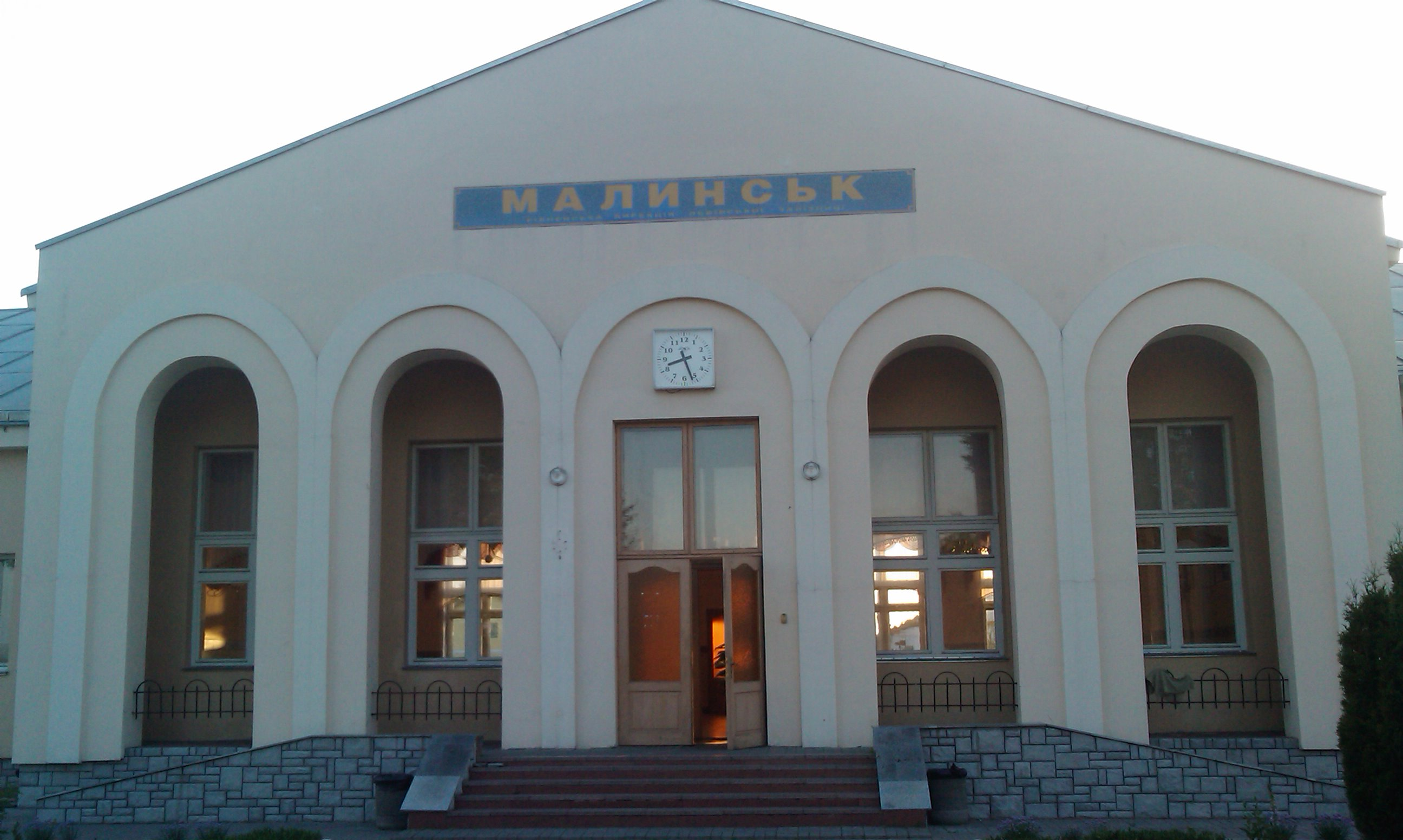
- Railway station in Malynsk

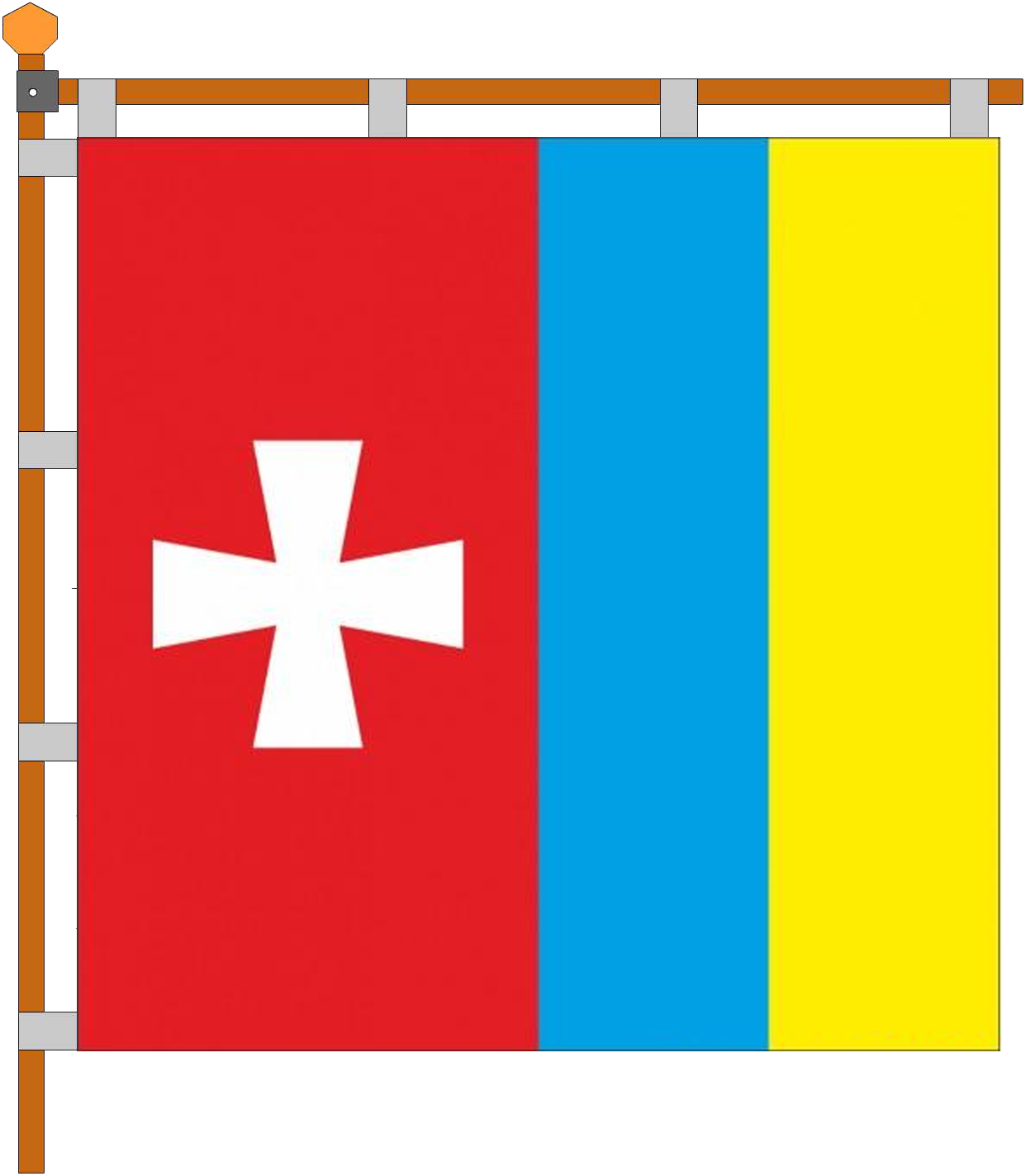
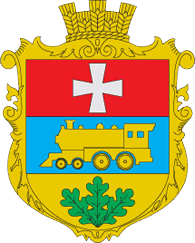
- Flag Coat of arms

- Location within Rivne Oblast Location within Ukraine
- Coordinates: 51°05′41″N 26°32′54″E
- Country: Ukraine
- Oblast: Rivne Oblast
- Raion: Rivne Raion
- Hromada: Malynsk rural hromada
- Village founded: 1907
- Time zone: UTC+2 (EET)
  - Summer (DST): UTC+3 (EEST)
- Postal code: 34610
- Area code: +380 3653

Malynsk (Ukrainian: Малинськ) is a village in Rivne Raion of Rivne Oblast of Ukraine, but was formerly administered within Berezne Raion. According to the 2001 census, has a population of 1,700 inhabitants.

== Gallery ==
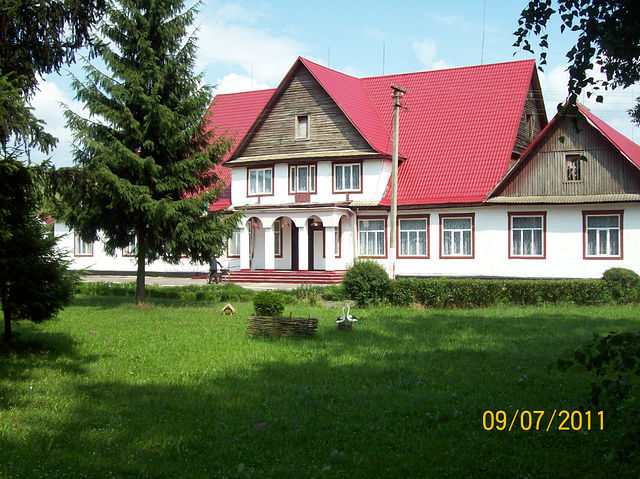
High school, beginning of 2000s

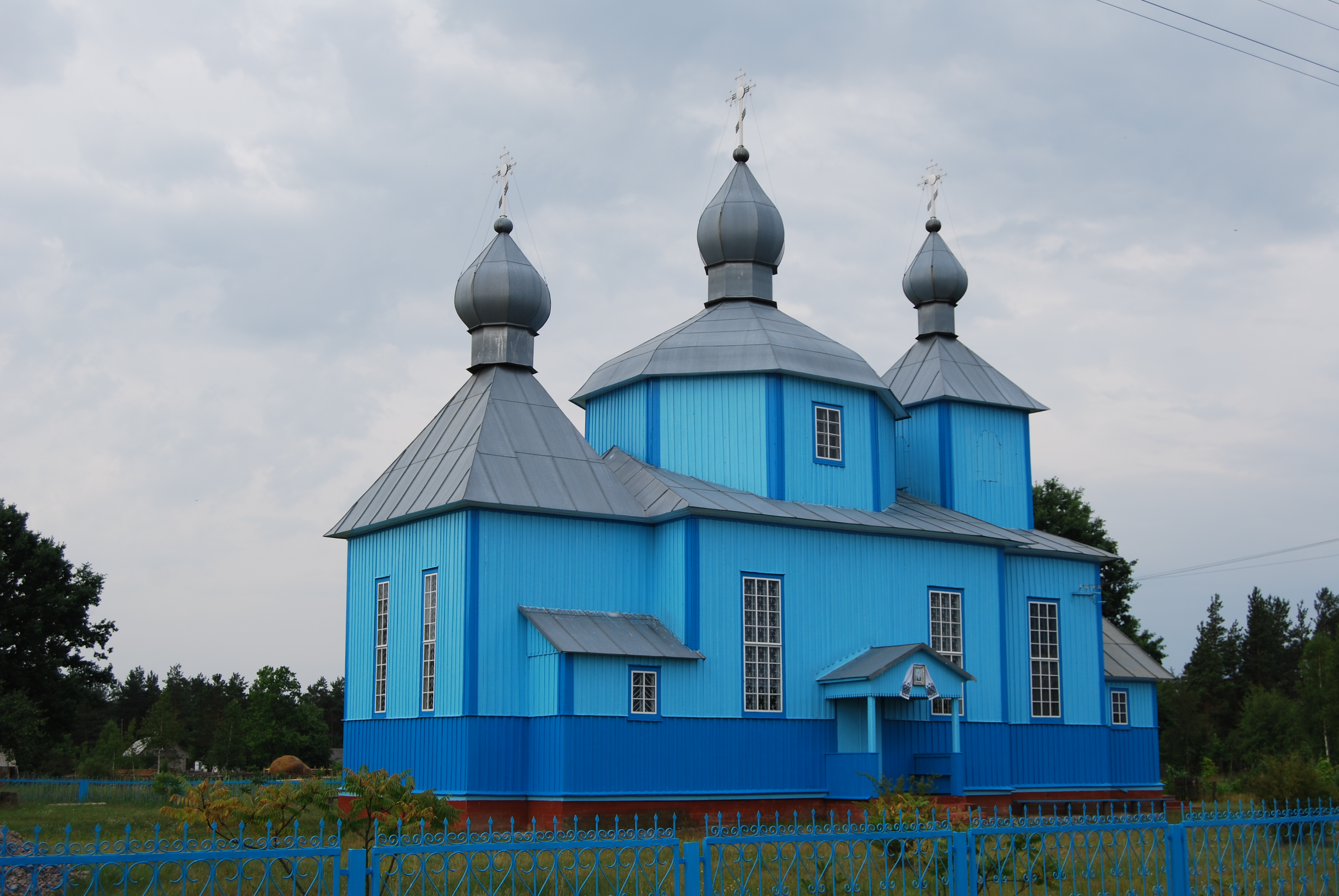
Wooden Orthodox Church of St. Peter and Paul

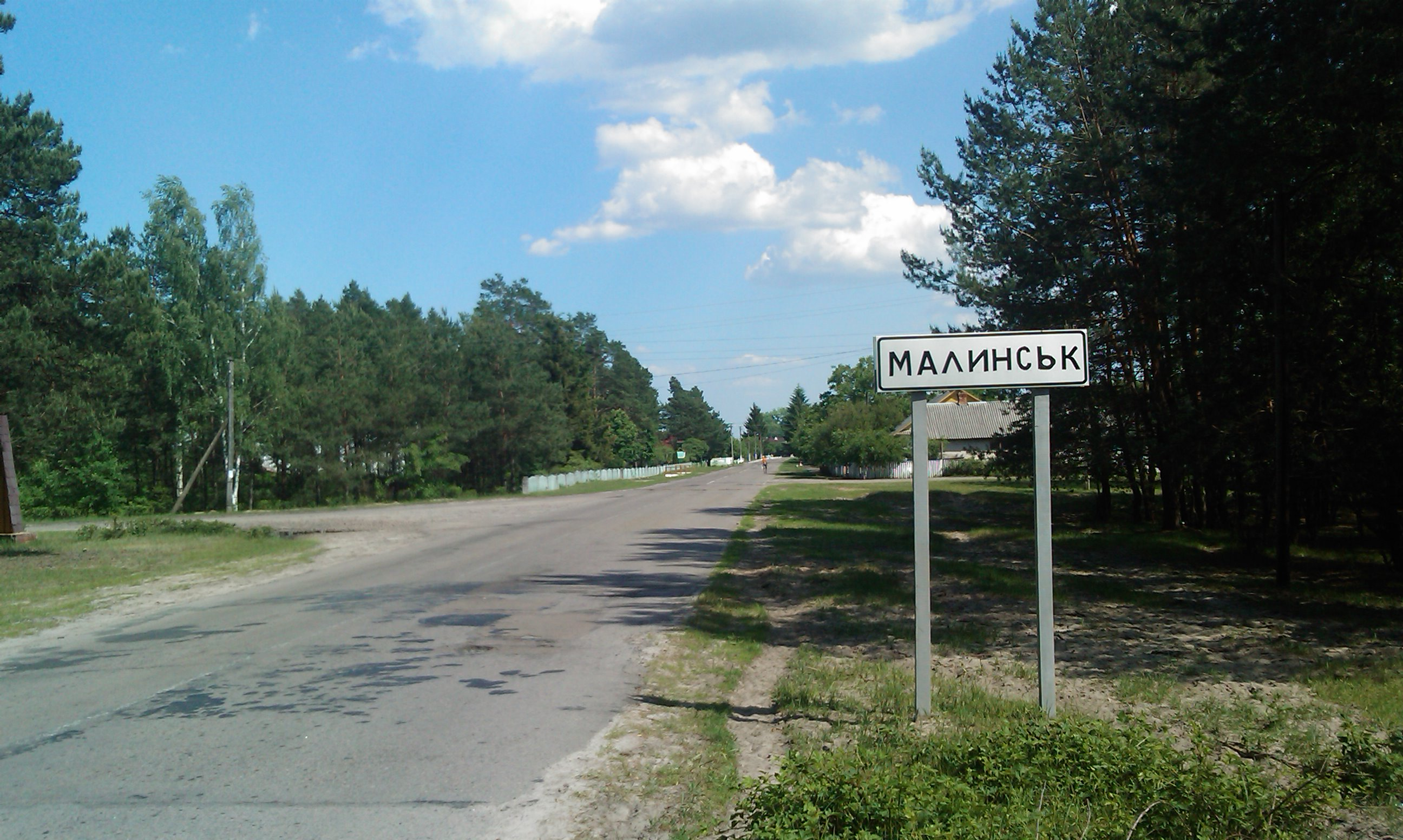
Village entrance from town of Stepan (west)

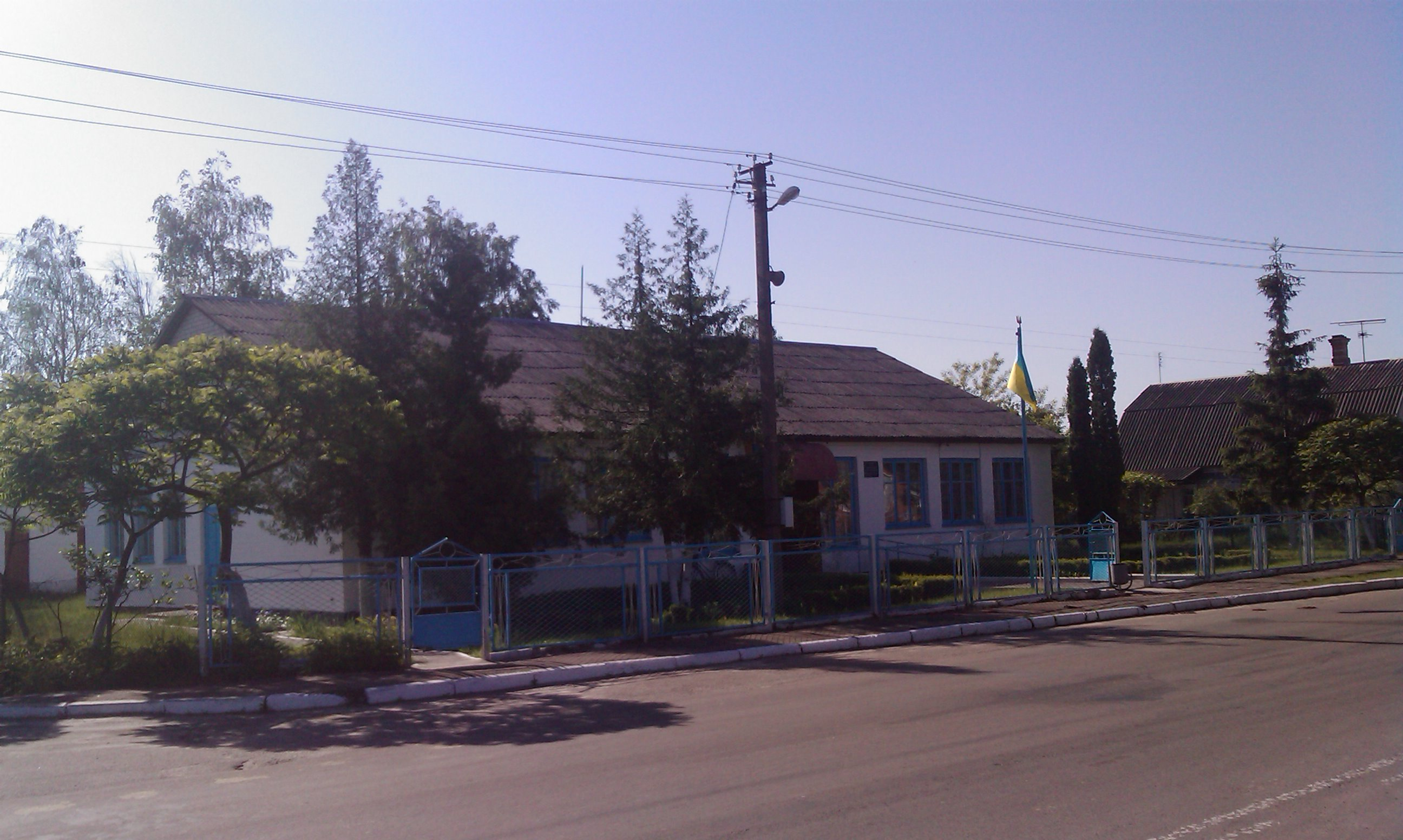
Administration building
