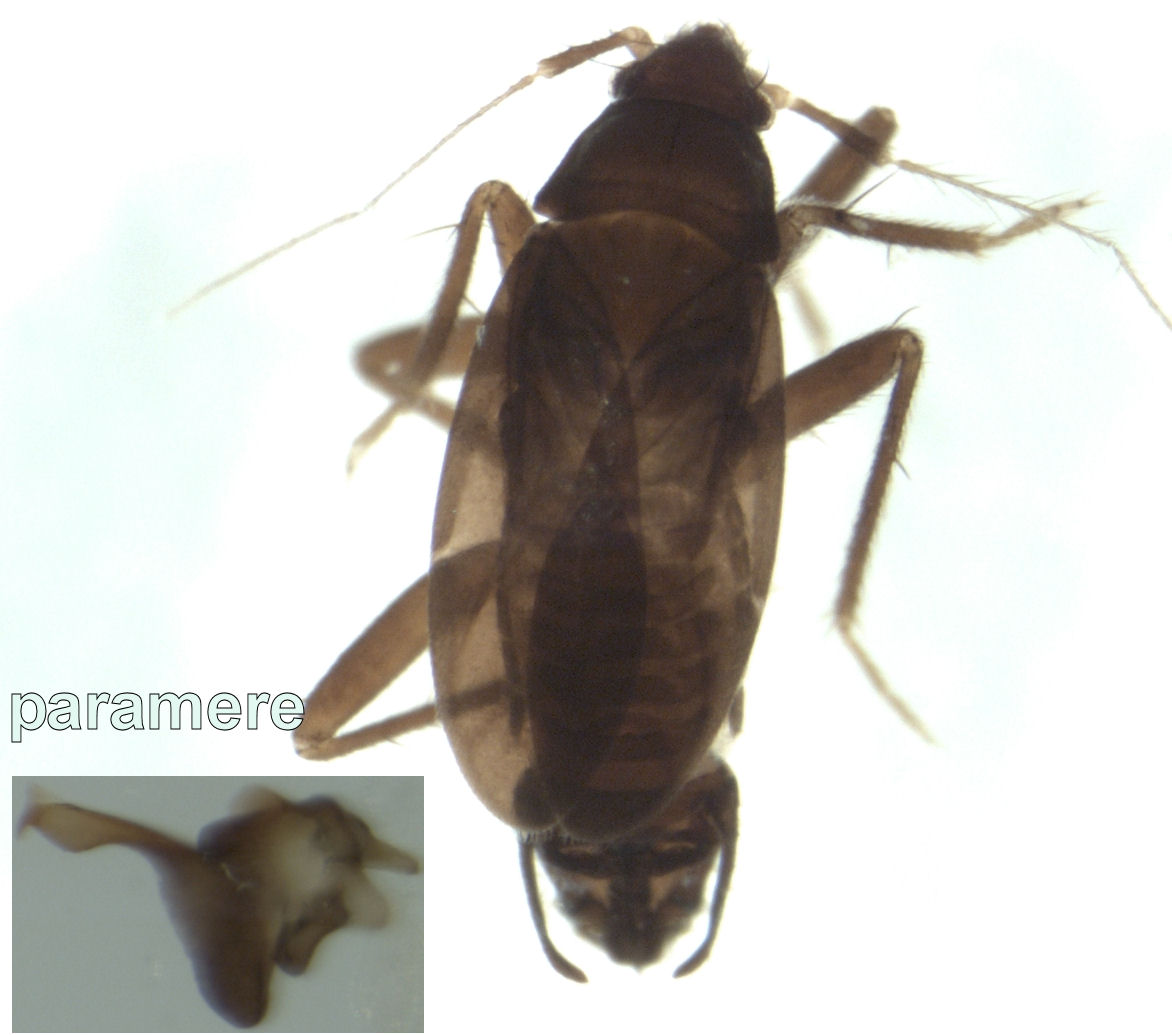
- Ceratocombus aotearoae

Scientific classification
- Domain: Eukaryota
- Kingdom: Animalia
- Phylum: Arthropoda
- Class: Insecta
- Order: Hemiptera
- Suborder: Heteroptera
- Family: Ceratocombidae
- Genus: Ceratocombus; Signoret, 1852

= Ceratocombus =

Genus of true bugs

Ceratocombus is a genus of litter bugs in the family Ceratocombidae. There are about nine described species in Ceratocombus.

== Species ==
These nine species belong to the genus Ceratocombus:

- Ceratocombus brevipennis Poppius, 1910^{g}
- Ceratocombus coleoptratus (Zetterstedt, 1819)^{i c g}
- Ceratocombus corticalis Reuter, 1889^{g}
- Ceratocombus cuneatus Mc Atee & Malloch, 1925^{g}
- Ceratocombus hawaiiensis Usinger, 1946^{i c g}
- Ceratocombus hesperus McAtee and Malloch, 1925^{i c g}
- Ceratocombus niger Uhler, 1904^{i c g}
- Ceratocombus taivanus Poppius, 1915^{g}
- Ceratocombus vagans Mcatee & Malloch, 1925^{i c g b}

Data sources: i = ITIS, c = Catalogue of Life, g = GBIF, b = Bugguide.net
