= Stemmocryptidae =

Scientific classification
- Kingdom: Animalia
- Phylum: Arthropoda
- Clade: Pancrustacea
- Class: Insecta
- Order: Hemiptera
- Suborder: Heteroptera
- Family: Stemmocryptidae
- Genus: Stemmocrypta
- Species: S. antennata

Binomial name
- Stemmocrypta antennata Štys, 1983

Family of true bugs

Stemmocryptidae is a monogeneric, monotypic family of bugs in the order Hemiptera, known from the ʻSisimangum village in the Madang Province of Papua New Guinea. Only one species in one genus is known, Stemmocrypta antennata.

The family is currently documented by specimens collected during a single UV light trapping.

== Morphology ==
S. antennata is elongate, with small eyes. The pronotal collar is absent. Among other peculiar features are a reduced proepimeron compared to other Dipsocoromorpha, a scent evaporatory structure, a distal expansion of the protibia, a membranous dorsal wall of the pygophore.

== Phylogeny ==
A 2021 analysis suggests Stemmocrpytidae is the sister group of all other Dipsocoromorpha.
