= Corixidea =

Scientific classification
- Domain: Eukaryota
- Kingdom: Animalia
- Phylum: Arthropoda
- Class: Insecta
- Order: Hemiptera
- Suborder: Heteroptera
- Family: Schizopteridae
- Genus: Corixidea; Reuter, 1891

Genus of true bugs

Corixidea is a genus of jumping soil bugs in the family Schizopteridae. There are at least three described species in Corixidea.

== Species ==
These three species belong to the genus Corixidea:

- Corixidea crassa McAtee & Malloch
- Corixidea lunigera (Reuter, 1891)
- Corixidea major Mcatee & Malloch, 1925
