= Glipostena =

Scientific classification
- Domain: Eukaryota
- Kingdom: Animalia
- Phylum: Arthropoda
- Class: Insecta
- Order: Coleoptera
- Suborder: Polyphaga
- Infraorder: Cucujiformia
- Family: Mordellidae
- Subfamily: Mordellinae
- Tribe: Mordellistenini
- Genus: Glipostena; Ermisch, 1941

Type species
- Mordellistena pelecotomoidea Píc, 1911

Genus of beetles

Glipostena is a genus of beetles in the family Mordellidae, containing the following species:

- Glipostena congoana Ermisch, 1952
- Glipostena dimorpha Franciscolo, 1999
- Glipostena hogsbacki Franciscolo, 1999
- Glipostena medleri Franciscolo, 1999
- Glipostena nemoralis Franciscolo, 1962
- Glipostena nigricans Franciscolo, 2000
- Glipostena pelecotomoidea (Píc, 1911)
- Glipostena ponomarenkoi Odnosum & Perkovsky, 2009†
- Glipostena sergeli Ermisch, 1942†
