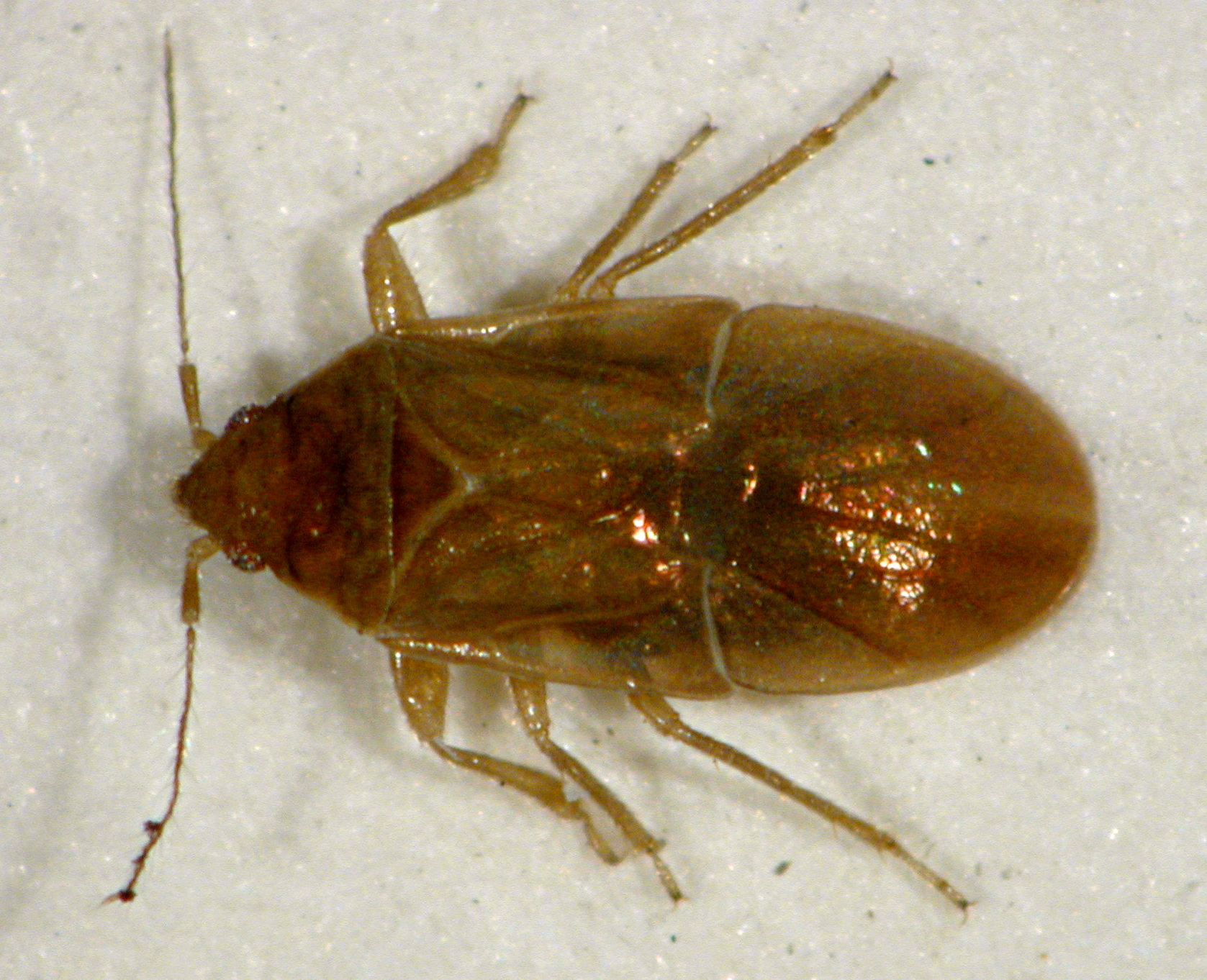
- Cryptostemma sp. (female)

Scientific classification
- Kingdom: Animalia
- Phylum: Arthropoda
- Class: Insecta
- Order: Hemiptera
- Suborder: Heteroptera
- Infraorder: Dipsocoromorpha

Families
- Ceratocombidae; Dipsocoridae; Hypsipterygidae; Schizopteridae; Stemmocryptidae

= Dipsocoromorpha =

Jumping ground bugs

Infraorder of true bugs

Dipsocoromorpha is an infraorder of insects in the order Hemiptera (true bugs) containing roughly 300 species, in one superfamily, Dipsocoroidea. The insects of this group live on the ground and in the leaf litter, though they can also be found in mangroves, low vegetation areas, and interstitial areas of streams.

Dipsocoromorpha contains some of the smallest adult true bugs, usually between 0.5 and 4.0 mm long. They are often characterized by having a long, whip like antennae, with a flattened and broad body. Many of these insects have long hairs on their antennae, as well. Dipsocoromorpha tend to be more abundant in the tropics.

Fossil records of Dipsocoromorpha date back to the Early Cretaceous period, but relatively few fossils have been well preserved, making it difficult to assess the Dipsocoromorpha's place on the phylogenetic tree.
