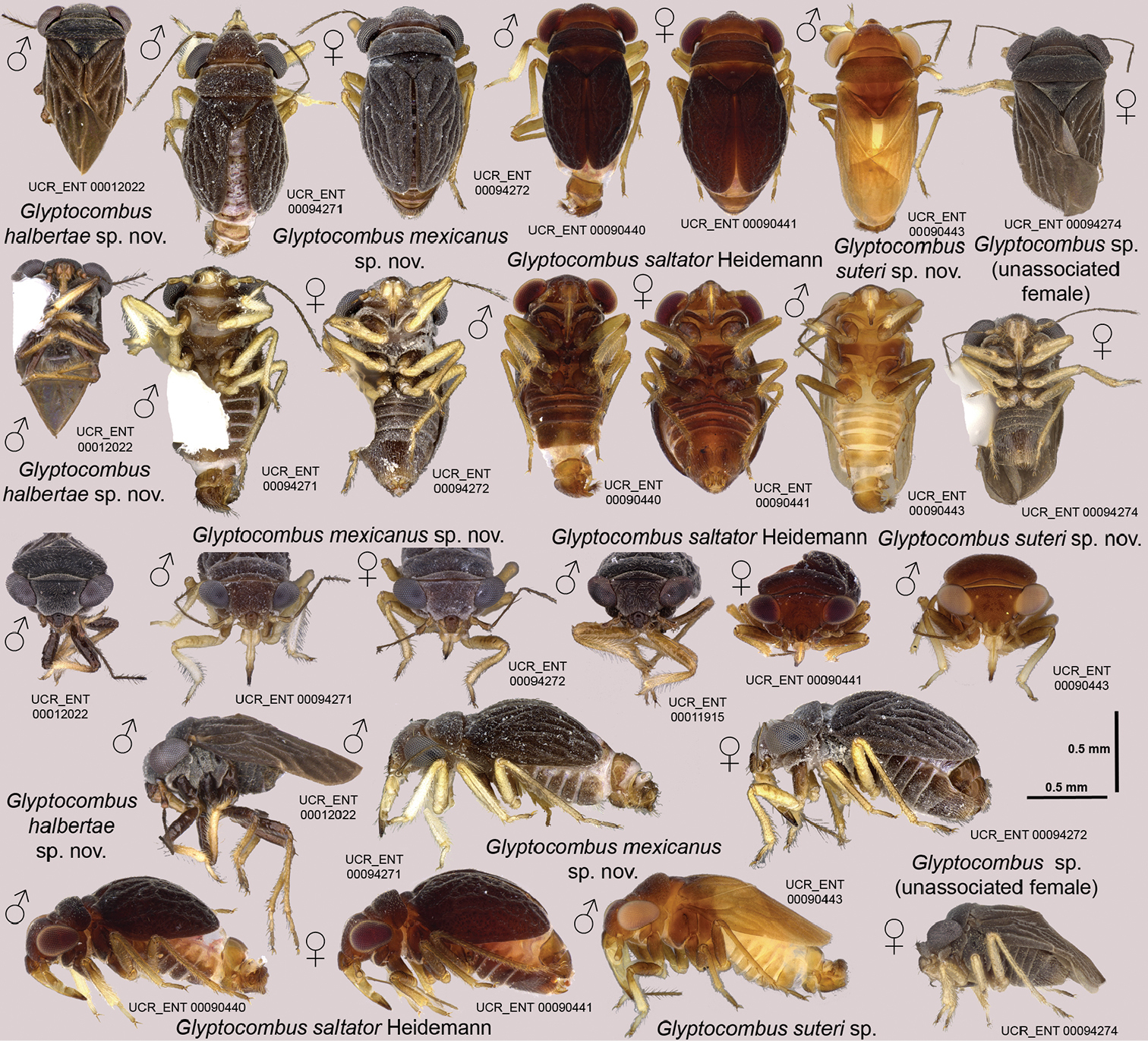

Scientific classification
- Kingdom: Animalia
- Phylum: Arthropoda
- Class: Insecta
- Order: Hemiptera
- Suborder: Heteroptera
- Family: Schizopteridae
- Genus: Glyptocombus; Heidemann, 1906

= Glyptocombus =

Genus of true bugs

Glyptocombus is a genus of jumping soil bugs in the family Schizopteridae.

Glyptocombus was formerly considered a monotypic genus, but in 2018 Weirauch, et al., described three new species from the United States and Mexico.

== Species ==
These four species belong to the genus Glyptocombus;

- Glyptocombus halberti Weirauch 2018
- Glyptocombus mexicanus Weirauch 2018
- Glyptocombus saltator Heidemann, 1906
- Glyptocombus suteri Weirauch 2018
