= Glipostena dimorpha =

Scientific classification
- Domain: Eukaryota
- Kingdom: Animalia
- Phylum: Arthropoda
- Class: Insecta
- Order: Coleoptera
- Suborder: Polyphaga
- Infraorder: Cucujiformia
- Family: Mordellidae
- Subfamily: Mordellinae
- Tribe: Mordellistenini
- Genus: Glipostena
- Species: G. dimorpha

Binomial name
- Glipostena dimorpha Franciscolo, 1999

Species of beetle

Glipostena dimorpha is a species of beetle in the genus Glipostena. It was discovered in 1999.
