= Rovno amber =

Amber found in the Rivne Oblast

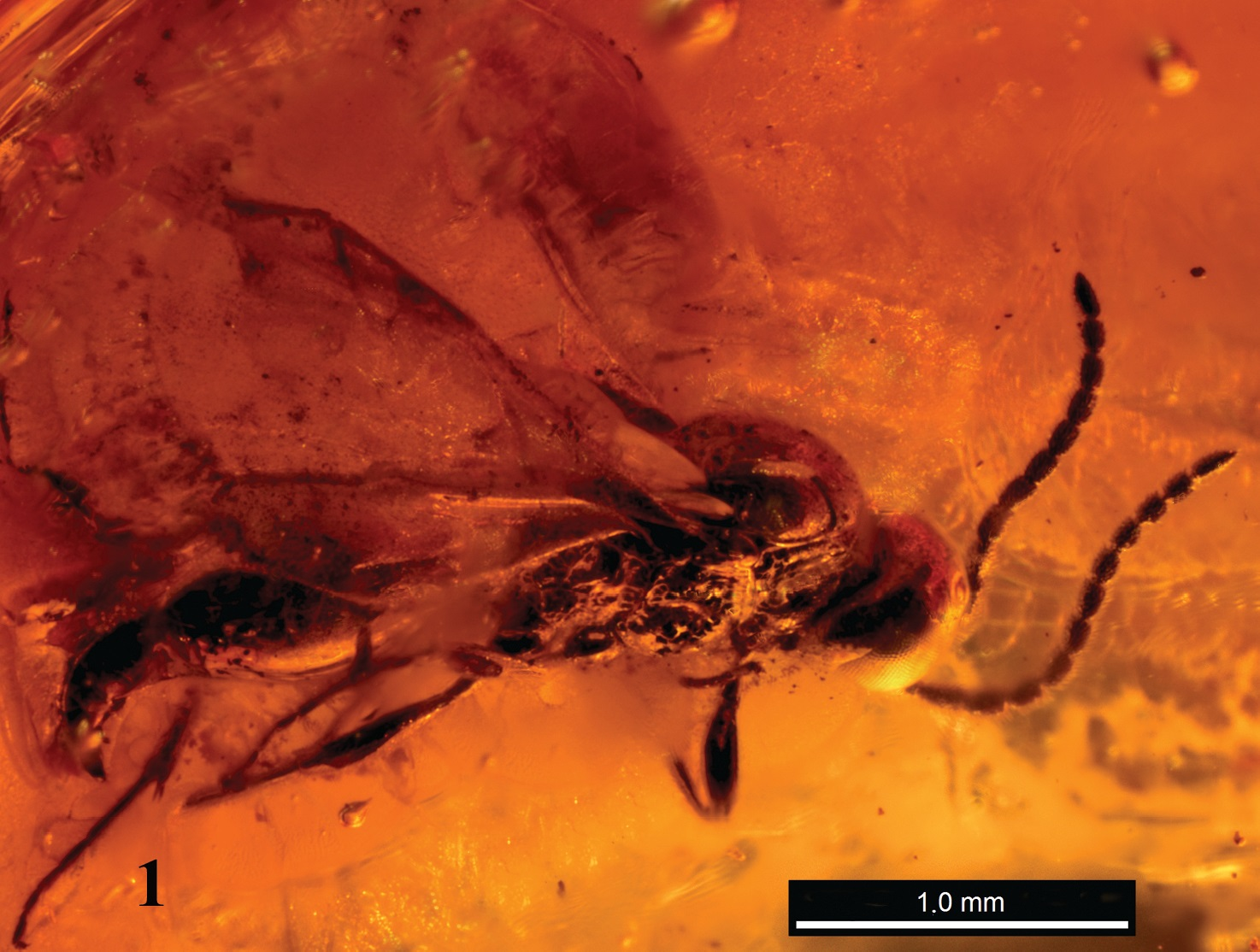
Extinct wasp Disogmus rasnitsyni

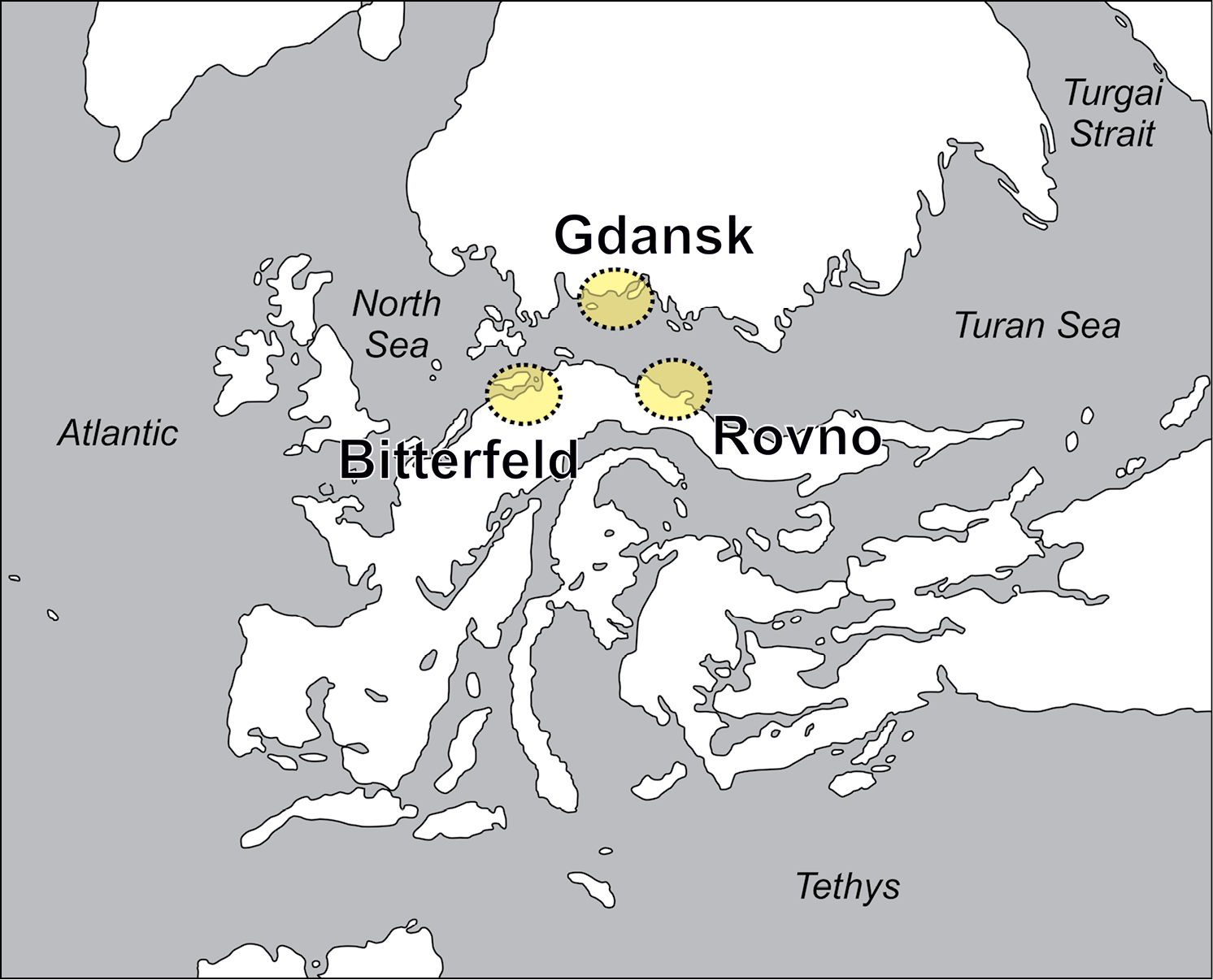
Paleogeographic context of the Rivne Amber in Eocene Europe

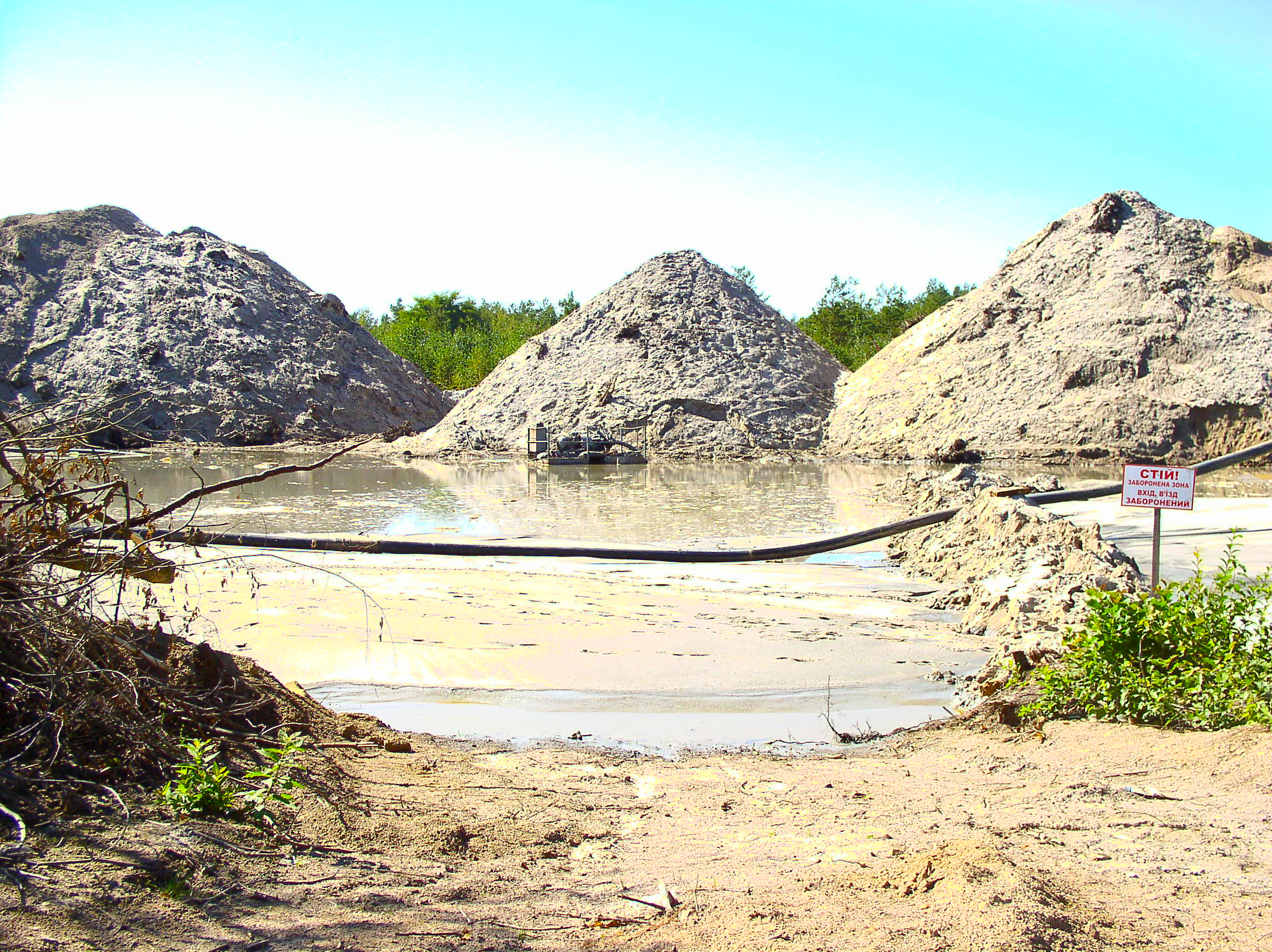
Amber mine in Klesiv

Rovno amber, occasionally called Ukrainian amber, is amber found in the Rivne Oblast and surrounding regions of Ukraine and Belarus. The amber is dated between Late Eocene and Early Oligocene, and suggested to be contemporaneous to Baltic amber (Prussian Formation). Major exploration and mining of the amber did not start until the 1990s.

== Geology ==
The late Eocene amber is hosted in the Obukhov Formation, with early reports of occurrences in the underlying Mezhigorje Formation as well, with the Mezhigorje Formation being where most of the amber is found. The formations are found along the northwestern margin of the Ukrainian Crystalline Shield exposed in the Rivne region of Ukraine and across the border near Rechitsa in the Gomel Region of Belarus. The granite basement rock was overlain by sandy to clayey deposits that were host to alluvial amber. The two formations total between 2–7 m (6.6–23.0 ft) in thickness, both containing interbeds or mixtures of brown coals and carbonized vegetation. Both formations are sandy to clayey in texture, with the Obukhov having more clayey glauconite-quartz plus sandy loess, while the Mezhigorje is mostly medium to fine grained sands of a greenish gray tone, and with occasional iron impregnation and layering.

== Prehistoric use ==
Small amounts of rough, partially worked, and fully shaped amber have been recovered from Paleolithic and Neolithic sites in the Dnieper area. At a site near Mezhyrich, four large mammoth bone huts attributed to Cro-Magnon Homo sapiens included over 300 pieces of amber attributed to Rivne origins. Many of the amber pieces are roughly fashioned into triangular and circular shapes. Dating of the site ranges between 13,300 and 10,500 B.C., when the regions of Baltic amber deposits in Kaliningrad and Lithuania were still covered with ice-sheets. A small female statuette of carved amber was found near Dobranichevka, while a 12 cm (4.72 in) disc with a central hole, and a hunting scene carved on one side was found in a Globular Amphora culture tomb in the Dubno district of Ukraine.

== Mining ==
The main use of amber until the 20th century was for burning, and rarely was it shaped for crafts. As such, before the 1990s amber recovery wasn't overseen by the Ukrainian government, with small amounts found after rains and thaws and during well construction and while the Kyiv-Kovel rail line was being built. Small scale collecting of the amber started to gain momentum in the 1950s when granite deposits in the Klesiv area were beginning to be developed. At that time the amber was picked from drainage piles and tailings dumps of the granite quarries, often limited in access by the quarry operators. Following an increase in the amber for jewelry production in Kyiv, Lithuania, and Poland, during the 1970s investigation and eventual start of the Pugach quarry in Klesiv culminated in 1991. In 1993 the Ukrainian government first started state overseen mining, under the auspices of Ukrburshtyn and at the same time making other major amber mining illegal. The current mining, centered on the Pugach quarry is operated by Burshtyn-Ukrainy.

90% of Ukrainian amber is extracted illegally and the trade is controlled by armed organised crime groups. The amber is extracted by pumping water into the sandy sediments forcing the amber to the surface, creating pits. Areas where the amber is found are often covered in pine-beech forest, which is illegally deforested to extract the amber. Annual volumes of amber extracted illegally are suggested to be around 300 tons. The richest placer deposits of Rivne amber are associated with the Obukhiv (late Eocene) and Mezhigorje (early Oligocene) Formations; deposits in the Kyiv region are known to come from the base of the Mezhigorje Fm. The majority of Rivne amber is mined from the lower part of the aforementioned Formation, with the most notable locality being the Pugach Quarry in Klesiv.

== Composition ==
Amber from the Klesiv deposit and others in Ukraine have up to 0.1% Fe giving many pieces yellow-brown and brownish red tones to the amber, though nearly crystal clear to totally opaque are found as well. Rare pieces have light green to pale green coloration, which typically fades to yellow after a year or two in the small pieces. However, larger pieces of green amber between 200–400 grams (7.1–14.1 oz) are more stable in color and have not faded after a decade. Most of the amber from the Klesiv area has an oxidization crust between 1.5–2.0 millimetres (0.059–0.079 in) thick and brown to dark brown in coloration. Amber from the Volnoje area northwest of Klesiv often show a smooth transparent dark yellow crust, which is rarely seen in Klesiv specimens. Similar to Baltic amber, Rivne amber is viscous in plasticity and unaltered pieces of both have a density of 0.98–1.13 g/cm^{3}. Infrared spectroscopy of the amber shows carboxyl, hydroxyl, peroxide, and complex ester functional groups and additionally single and double bonds in the molecular structure are present placing Rivne amber in the succinite range, same as Baltic amber. Trace amounts of Pb, Y, Zn, Zr, and some other elements are present in Rivne amber. Small to no detectable amounts of those elements are detected in Baltic amber.

== Paleoecology ==
There are a number of arthropod taxa, ranging from planthoppers, such as Alicodoxa, and ants to mites and spiders that are shared between Rivne and Baltic amber. As of 2016 there were 193 ant species described from Priabonian age European ambers, with all but 56 of the species being found in or described originally from Baltic amber, while Rivne amber hosts 31 of the 56 species that are not known from Baltic amber. Based on the differences in ant fauna between Baltic amber and Rivne amber, it has been suggested by Perkovsky that the two were different areas of a large forest that covered Late Eocene to early Oligocene Europe. The spiders of Rivne amber are similar to Baltic amber ones, but there is a notable percentage that are unique species not shared between the two. Similarly the gall midges from Rivne amber are entirely unique to Rivne and not shared at all with the Baltic amber. A drier climate for the Rivne forest is also suggested based on the high percentage of the Collembola families Entomobryidae and Sminthuridae, 59.7% and 24.5% respectively of the Collembola fauna. Baltic amber fly families have a distinct percentage of families associated with aquatic and semi-aquatic habitats, such as Chironomidae, while the Rivne fly fauna includes nearly double the amount of Sciaridae, Tipulidae, Mycetophilidae and other families associated with leaf litter habitats, called the "Sciara" zone. This is also seen in the coleopterans. There is an overall smaller number of aphids, a condition suggesting a possible subtropical climate for the Rivne forest, while the percentage of the hymenopteran family Scelionidae suggests a drier climate as well.

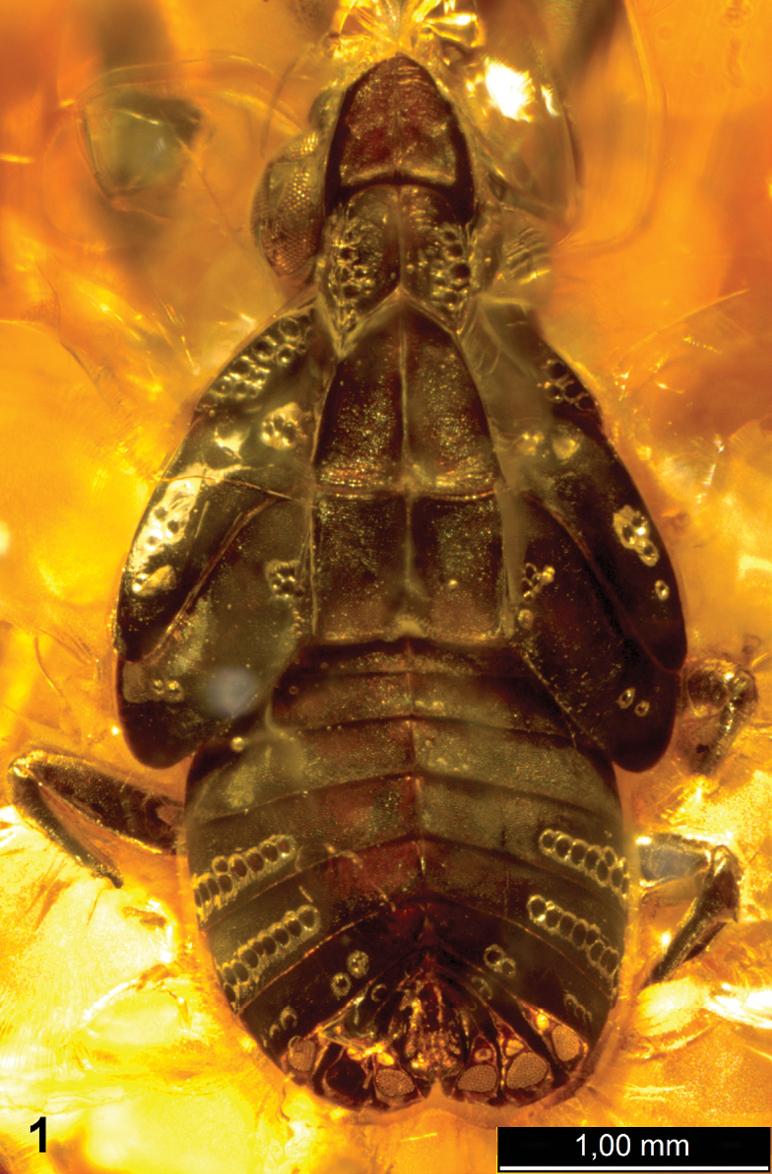
Extinct hopper Alicodoxa rasnitsyni nymph

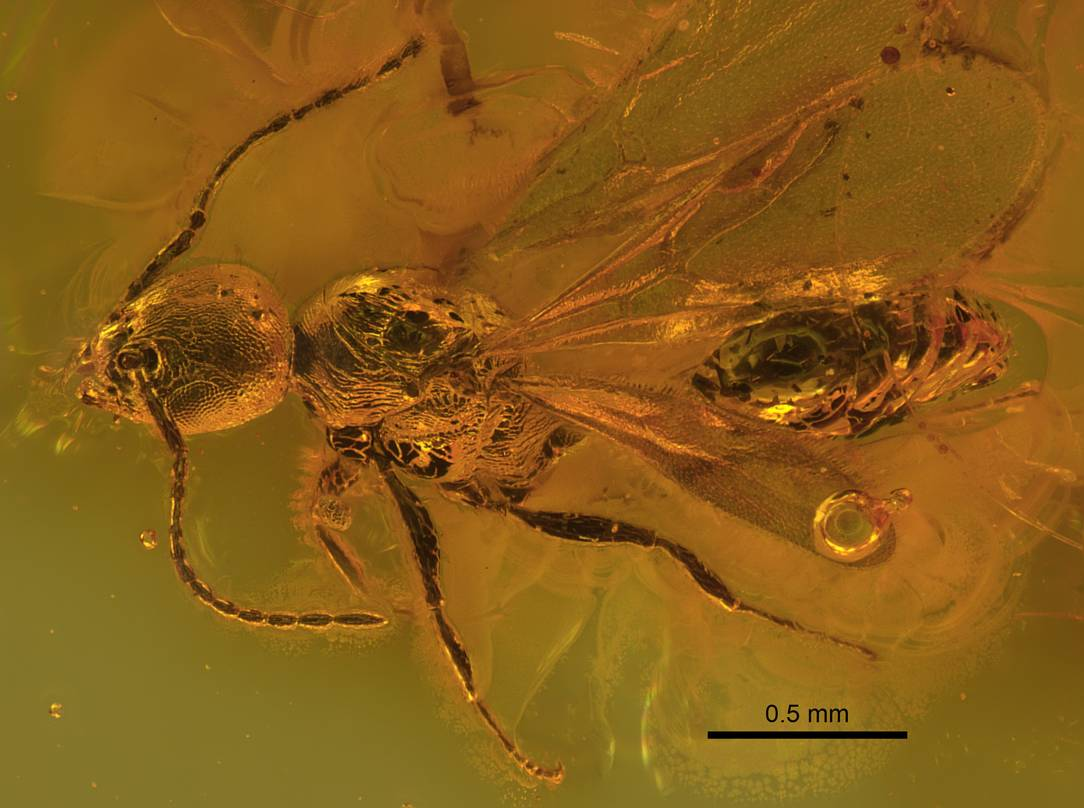
Eocenomyrma ukrainica holotype male

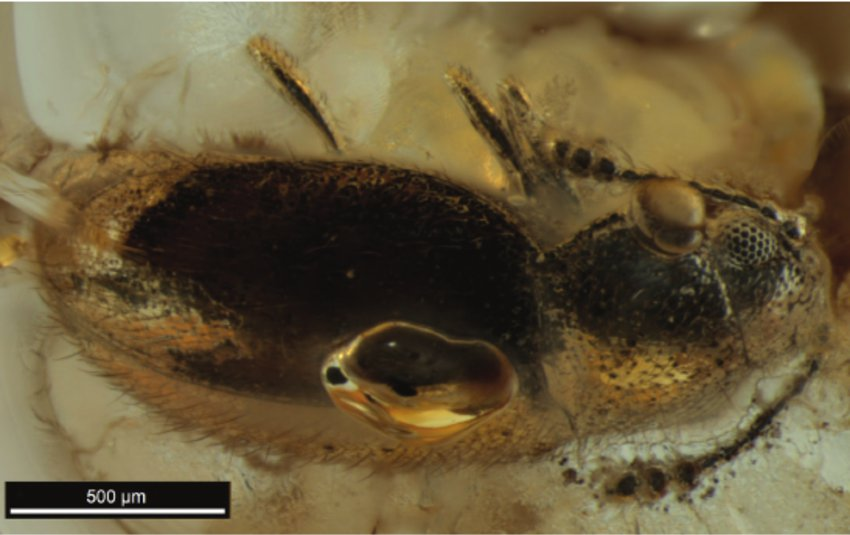
Extinct silken fungus beetle Cryptophagus alexagrestis

== Taxa ==
There are several hundred families of arthropods identified from Rovno amber, with major reviews being compiled by Perkovsky et al (2003, 2007, 2010).

=== Plantae ===
==== Bryophyta ====
- Brachytheciaceae
- Ctenidiaceae
- Neckeraceae
- Rhachitheciaceae

==== Marchantiophyta ====
- Jubulaceae

=== Crustacea ===
==== Isopoda ====
- Porcellionidae
- Trichoniscidae

=== Arachnida ===
==== Acari ====
- Anystidae
- Bdellidae
- ?Cepheidae
- Cheyletoidea
- Digamasellidae
- Erythraeidae
- Glaesacaridae
- ?Ixodidae
- Liacaroidea
- Microtrombidiidae
- Oppoidea
- ?Rhagidiidae

==== Araneae ====
- Araneidae
- Clubionidae
- Nesticidae
- Oonopidae
- Salticidae
- Linyphiidae
- Liocranidae
- Zodariidae

=== Myriapoda ===
==== Chilopoda ====
- Lithobiidae

==== Diplopoda ====
- Polyxenidae

=== Entognatha ===
==== Collembola ====
- Entomobryidae
- Hypogastruridae
- Sminthuridae
- Bourletiellidae
- Tomoceridae

=== Insects ===
==== Archaeognatha ====
- Machilidae

==== Blattodea ====
- Blaberidae?
- Blattellidae
- Polyphagidae

==== Coleoptera ====
- Aderidae
- Anthicidae
- Artematopidae
- Cantharidae
- Carabidae
- Cleridae
- Chrysomelidae
- Curculionidae
- Dermestidae
- Elateridae
- Helodidae
- Languriidae
- Lathridiidae
- Leiodidae
- Melandryidae
- Melyridae
- Monotomidae
- Mordellidae
- Mycetophagidae
- Nitidulidae
- Ptiliidae
- Ptinidae
- Scolytidae
- Scraptiidae
- Scirtidae
- Scydmaenidae
- Staphylinidae
- Zopheridae

==== Diptera ====
- Acroceridae
- Asilidae
- Bibionidae
- Bombyliidae?
- Campichoetidae
- Cecidomyiidae
- Ceratopogonidae
- Chaodoridae
- Chironomidae
- Clusiidae
- Dixidae
- Dolichopodidae
- Drosophilidae
- Empididae
- Keroplatidae
- Limoniidae
- Mycetobiidae
- Mycetophilidae
- Mythicomyiidae
- Phoridae
- Psychodidae
- Rhagionidae
- Scatopsidae
- Sciaridae
- Simuliidae
- Syrphidae
- Tipulidae

==== Ephemeroptera ====
- Heptageniidae

==== Hemiptera ====
- Achilidae
- Aleyrodidae
- Anthocoridae
- Aphalaridae?
- Cercopidae
- Cicadellidae
- Cixiidae
- Dictyopharidae
- Drepanosiphidae
- Electraphididae
- Eriosomatidae
- Lygaeidae
- Matsucoccidae
- Microphysidae
- Mindaridae
- Miridae
- Ortheziidae
- Pemphigidae
- Piesmatidae
- Pseudococcidae
- Reduviidae
- Saldidae
- Schizopteridae
- Tingidae
- Tropiduchidae?

==== Hymenoptera ====
- Aphelinidae
- Bethylidae
- Braconidae
- Ceraphronidae
- Chrysididae
- Crabronidae
- Cynipidae
- Diapriidae
- Embolemidae
- Encyrtidae
- Eurytomidae?
- Eulophidae
- Evaniidae
- Figitidae
- Formicidae
- Ichneumonidae
- Megalyridae
- Megachilidae
- Megaspilidae
- Mutilidae
- Mymaridae
- Mymarommatidae
- Paxylommatidae
- Platygastridae
- Pompilidae
- Proctotrupidae
- Pteromalidae
- Scelionidae
- Signiphoridae
- Tetracampidae
- Torymidae
- Trichogrammatidae

==== Isoptera ====
- Kalotermitidae
- Rhinotermitidae
- Stylotermitidae

==== Lepidoptera ====
- Gelechioidea (family indeterminate)
- Psychidae
- Tineoidea (family indeterminate)

==== Mantodea ====
Family indeterminate

==== Mecoptera ====
- Bittacidae

==== Neuroptera ====
- Coniopterygidae
- Hemerobiidae
- Nevrorthidae

==== Orthoptera ====
- Gryllidae
- Tettigoniidae

==== Plecoptera ====
- Capniidae
- Leuctridae

==== Psocoptera ====
- Archipsocidae
- Caeciliusidae
- Ephemeriidae
- Epipsocidae
- Psocidae
- Sphaeropsocidae

==== Raphidioptera ====
- Raphidiidae

==== Thysanoptera ====
- Aeolothripidae
- Merothripidae
- Phloeothripidae
- Thripidae

==== Trichoptera ====
- Beraeida
- Calamoceratidae
- Ecnomidae
- Hydroptilidae
- Philopotamidae
- Phryganeidae
- Polycentropodidae
- Psychomyiidae

==== Strepsiptera ====
Family indeterminate
