= Stanisław Gabriel Worcell =

Polish revolutionary

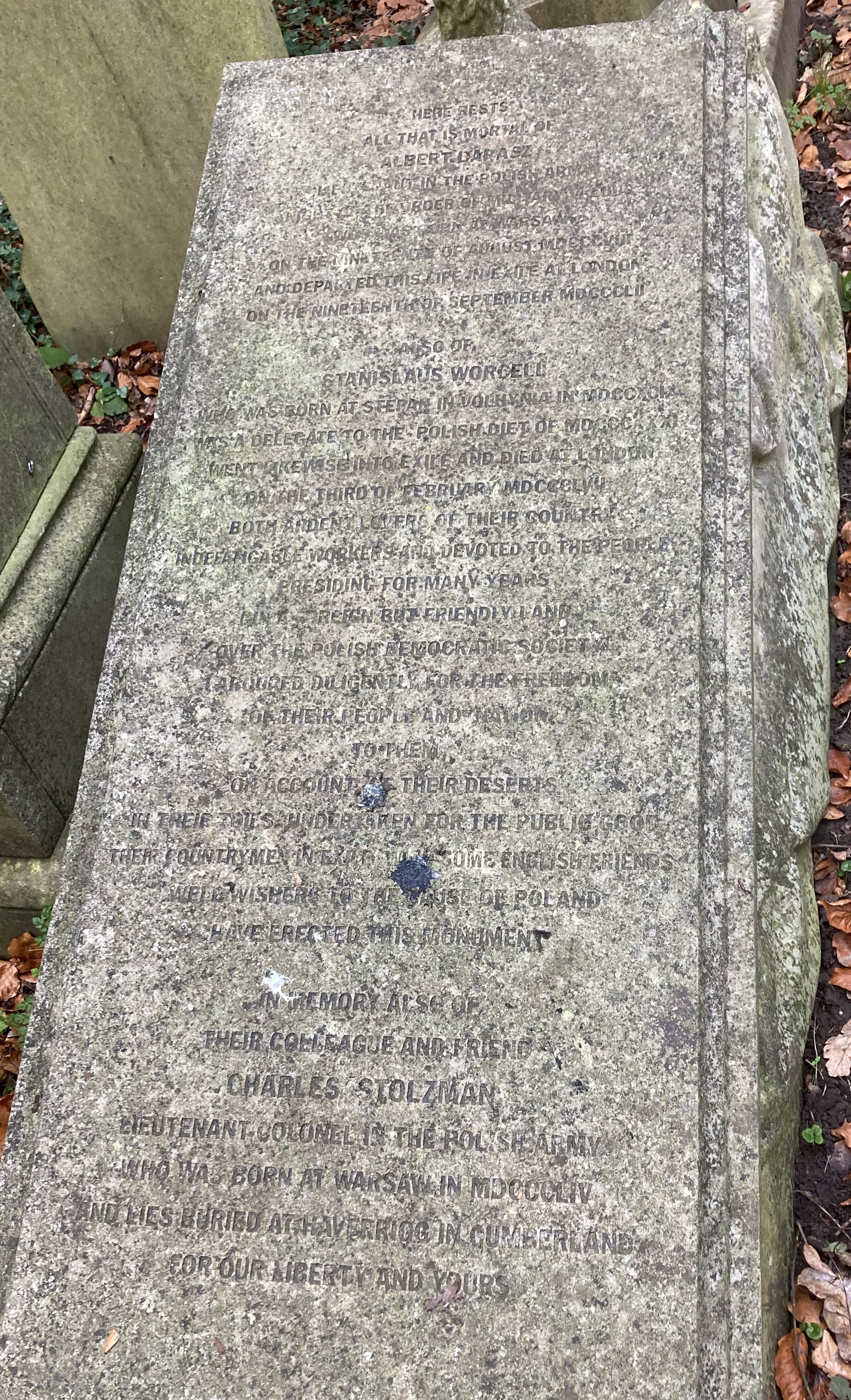
Grave of Stanislaw Gabriel Worcell in Highgate Cemetery

Stanisław Gabriel Worcell (26 March 1799 in Stepań/Volhynia – 3 February 1857 in London) was a socialist Polish revolutionary. Throughout his life, he lived in France, England, and Jersey. On August 11, 1831, he was awarded the Silver Cross of the Virtuti Militari. He is currently buried on the western side of Highgate Cemetery.
