= Hypsipterygidae =

Scientific classification
- Domain: Eukaryota
- Kingdom: Animalia
- Phylum: Arthropoda
- Class: Insecta
- Order: Hemiptera
- Suborder: Heteroptera
- Infraorder: Dipsocoromorpha
- Family: Hypsipterygidae; Drake, 1961
- Genus: Hypsipteryx; Drake, 1961

Family of true bugs

Hypsipterygidae is a small family of bugs in the order Hemiptera, known from Africa and Southeast Asia. There are 4 extant species in one genus, Hypsipteryx, and one fossil species. They resemble, but are unrelated to, the family Tingidae.

== Species ==
- Hypsipteryx ecpaglus Drake, 1961
- †Hypsipteryx hoffeinsorum Bechly & Wittmann, 2000
- Hypsipteryx machadoi Drake, 1961
- Hypsipteryx ugandensis Štys, 1970
- Hypsipteryx vasarhelyii Rédei, 2007
