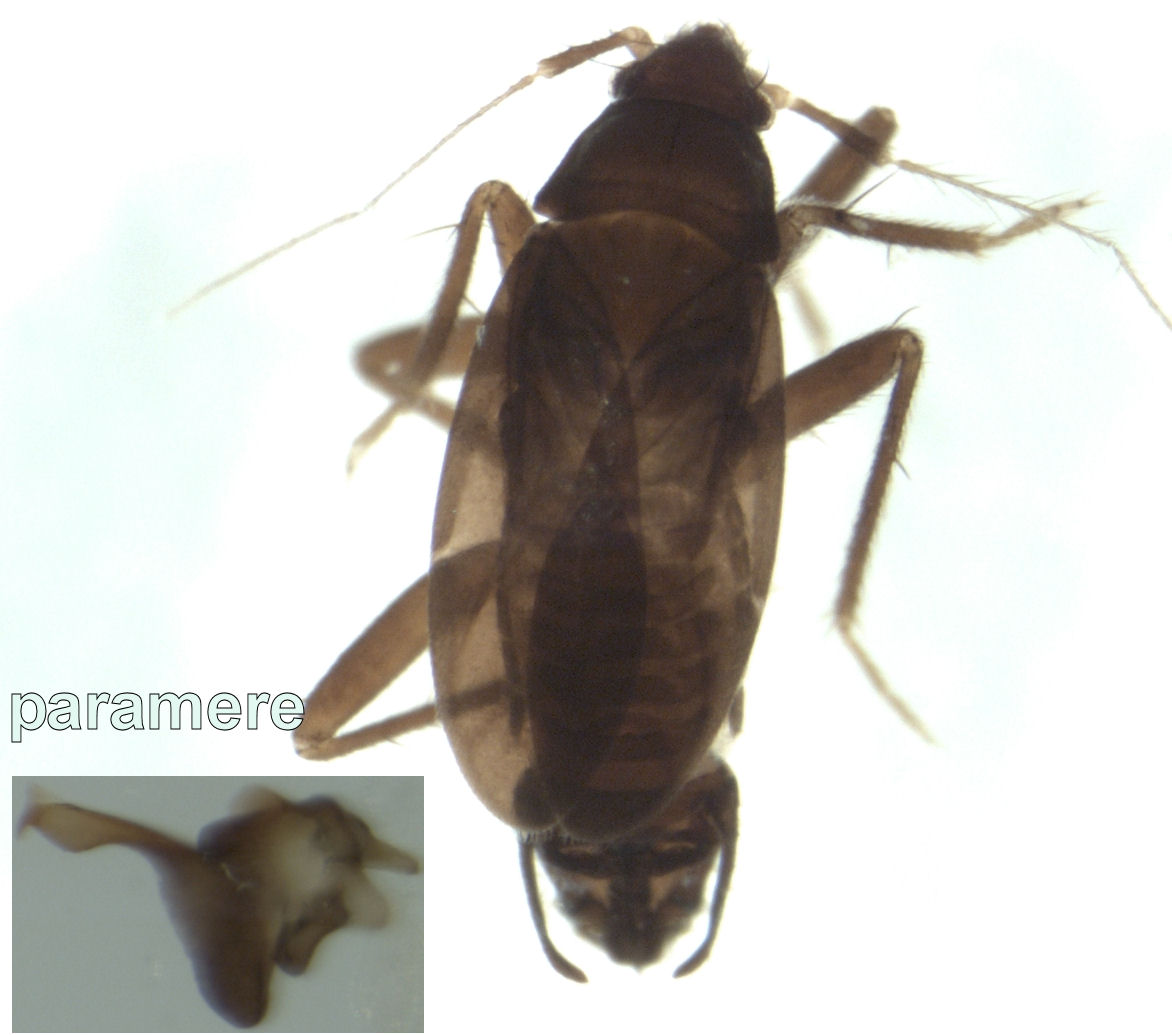
- Ceratocombus aotearoae

Scientific classification
- Domain: Eukaryota
- Kingdom: Animalia
- Phylum: Arthropoda
- Class: Insecta
- Order: Hemiptera
- Suborder: Heteroptera
- Infraorder: Dipsocoromorpha
- Family: Ceratocombidae; Fieber, 1861

= Ceratocombidae =

Family of true bugs

Ceratocombidae is a family of litter bugs in the order Hemiptera. They are closely related to the Dipsocoridae. There are at least 3 genera and 20 described species in Ceratocombidae. The forewing has 2 to 3 large cells and body does not have any strong bristles and there is no central eye bristle. Their diversity is greatest in the Indo-Pacific region.

== Genera ==
Three genera are placed in this family:

- Astemma Lepeletier & Serville, 1825
- Ceratocombus Signoret, 1852
- Leptonannus Reuter, 1891
