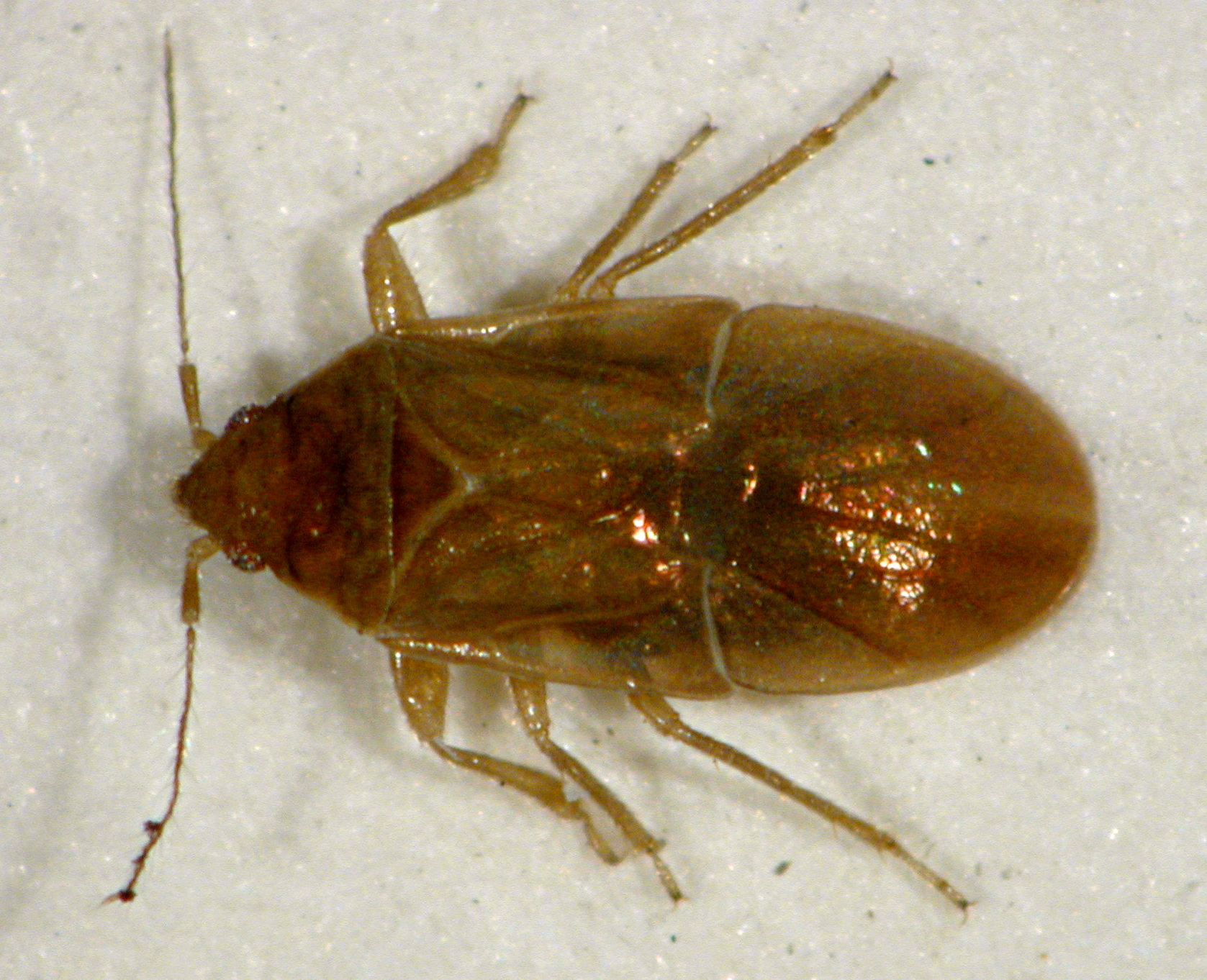
- Dipsocoridae

Scientific classification
- Domain: Eukaryota
- Kingdom: Animalia
- Phylum: Arthropoda
- Class: Insecta
- Order: Hemiptera
- Suborder: Heteroptera
- Infraorder: Dipsocoromorpha
- Family: Dipsocoridae; Dohrn, 1859

Synonyms
- Cryptostemmatidae McAtee & Malloch, 1925

= Dipsocoridae =

Family of true bugs

Dipsocoridae are a family of heteropteran bugs known as jumping ground bugs. There are about 30 widely distributed species which are placed in three genera. Fossils from Eocene amber have also been placed in the family.

The antennae have four segments, the basal two being short and thick while the distal ones are slender appearing like a brush with long hairs with the third segment thickened at the base. They have ocelli and the three segmented beak is long. The head is horizontal and there are no prominent forecoxal cavities.

== Genera ==
BioLib includes:

1. Alpagut Kiyak, 1995 (synonyms Raunocoris, Harpago) (Palaearctic),
2. Cryptostemma Herrich-Schaeffer, 1835 (worldwide),
3. Pachycoleus Fieber, 1860 (Palaearctic, Oriental and Neotropical).

=== European species ===
Fauna Europaea includes:

- Alpagut castanovitreus (Linnavuori, 1951) (= Raunocoris castaneovitreus), Balkans, east Palaearctic
- Alpagut medius (Rey, 1888) (= Raunocoris medius), Balkans, France and Ukraine
- Cryptostemma alienum Herrich-Schäffer, 1835,: mainland Europe, British Isles, Middle East
- Cryptostemma carpaticum Josifov, 1967: Poland and Slovakia
- Cryptostemma remanei Josifov, 1964: France, Italy, Middle East
- Cryptostemma roubali Josifov, 1967: France only
- Pachycoleus pusillimum (J. Sahlberg, 1870): Spain, Scandinavia, Russia
- Pachycoleus waltli Fieber, 1860: northern Europe including the British Isles, France through to Russia.
