= Mezhigorje Formation =

Geologic formation

- Stratigraphic range: Early Oligocene
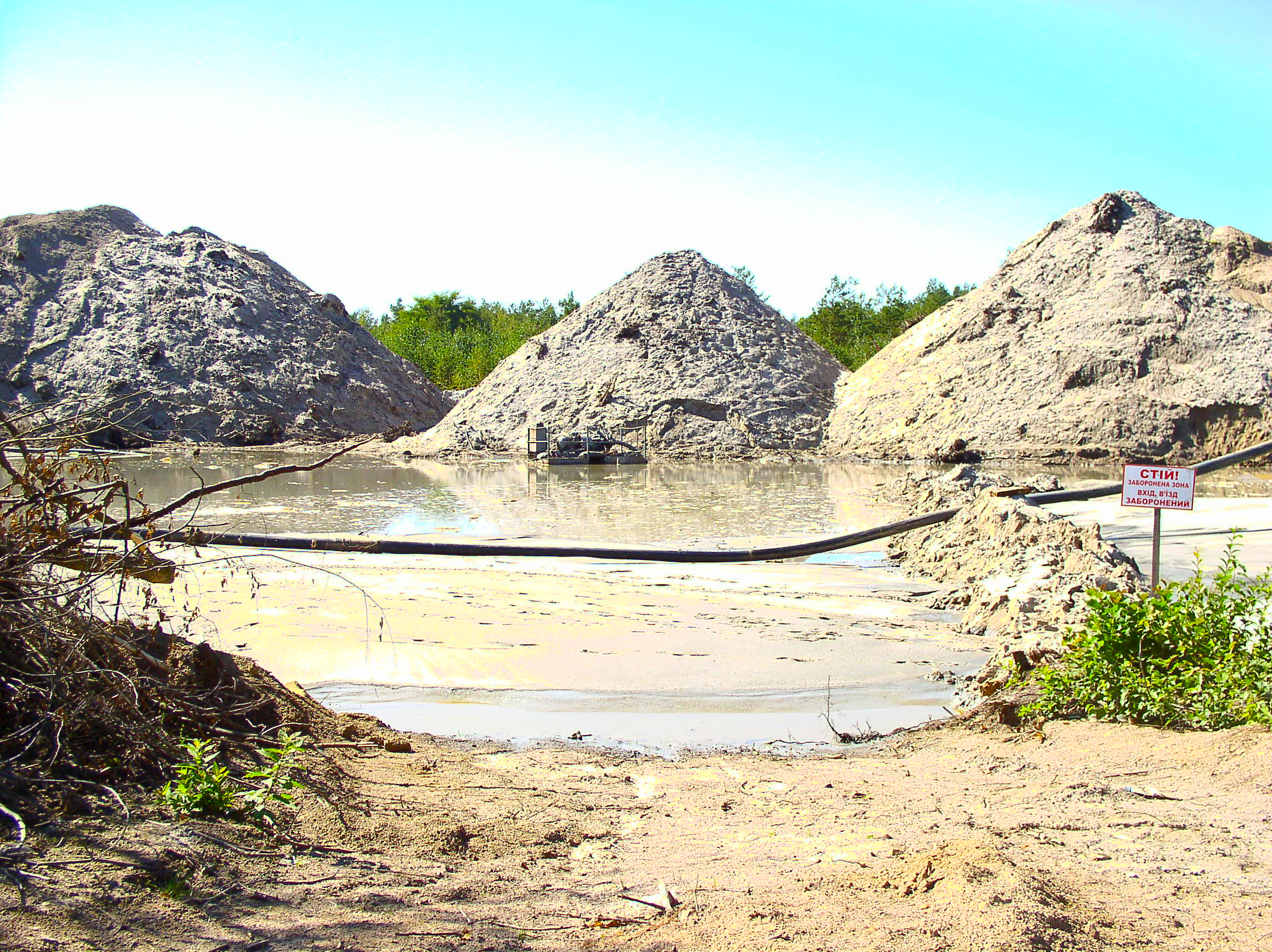
- Outcrop of the Mezhigorje Formation in Klesiv, Ukraine
- Type: Geological formation
- Overlies: Obukhov Formation
- Thickness: 2–7 m (6.6–23.0 ft)

Lithology
- Other: Sand, Clay, Amber

Location
- Location: Ukrainian Crystalline Shield
- Region: Belarus (Gomel Region); Ukraine (Rivne Oblast)

The Mezhigorje Formation is a geologic formation in Belarus and Ukraine that dates to the Early Oligocene. Rovno amber is found in this formation and it has been studied since the 1990s.

== History ==
Small amounts of rough, partially worked, and fully shaped amber discovered in the Mezhigorje Formation suggest that between 13,300 and 10,500 BC, the amber was used by early humans.

Rovno amber was first collected from the Mezhigorje Formation during the 1950s on a small scale and the amber was initially used for burning. The amber was first used for jewellery in the 1970s when another outcrop was discovered.

In 1991, the outcrop discovered during the 1970s began to be mined and later became the Pugach Quarry, and in 1993, the Ukrainian government began to oversee excavations of the Mezhigorje Formation for the first time. Despite this, 90% of amber collected from the Mezhigorje Formation is extracted illegally and the trade is controlled by armed organised crime groups.

== Geological context ==
The Early Oligocene Rovno amber is hosted in the Mezhigorje Formation, and it overlies the Late Eocene Obukhov Formation. The formation is found along the northwestern margin of the Ukrainian Crystalline Shield exposed in the Rivne region of Ukraine and across the border near Rechitsa in the Gomel Region of Belarus. The granite basement rock was overlain by sandy to clayey deposits that were host to alluvial amber.

The two formations total between 2–7 m (6.6–23.0 ft) in thickness, both containing interbeds or mixtures of brown coals and carbonized vegetation. Both formations are sandy to clayey in texture, with the Mezhigorje Formation containing mostly medium to fine grained sands of a greenish gray tone, and with occasional iron impregnation and layering.
