= Obukhov Formation =

Geologic formation

- Stratigraphic range: Late Eocene
- Type: Geological formation
- Underlies: Mezhigorje Formation
- Overlies: Early Eocene Basement
- Thickness: 2–7 m (6.6–23.0 ft)

Lithology
- Other: Sand, Clay, Amber, Glauconite, Quartz

Location
- Location: Ukrainian Crystalline Shield
- Region: Belarus (Gomel Region); Ukraine (Rivne Oblast)

The Obukhov Formation is a geologic formation in Belarus and Ukraine that dates to the Late Eocene; the Obukhov Formation is equivalent to the Prussian Formation of Russia.

Rovno amber is found in this formation, and 90% of amber collected from the Obukhov Formation is extracted illegally and the trade is controlled by armed organised crime groups, although the Ukrainian government has begun to oversee excavations since 1993.

== Geological context ==
The Late Eocene Rovno amber is hosted in the Obukhov Formation, and it underlies the Early Oligocene Mezhigorje Formation. The formation is found along the northwestern margin of the Ukrainian Crystalline Shield exposed in the Rivne region of Ukraine and across the border near Rechitsa in the Gomel Region of Belarus. The granite basement rock was overlain by sandy to clayey deposits that were host to alluvial amber.

The two formations total between 2–7 m (6.6–23.0 ft) in thickness, both containing interbeds or mixtures of brown coals and carbonized vegetation. Both formations are sandy to clayey in texture, with the Obukhov Formation having more clayey glauconite-quartz plus sandy loess.
