= Stepan =

Rural locality in Rivne Oblast, Ukraine

Stepan Степань
- Rural settlement
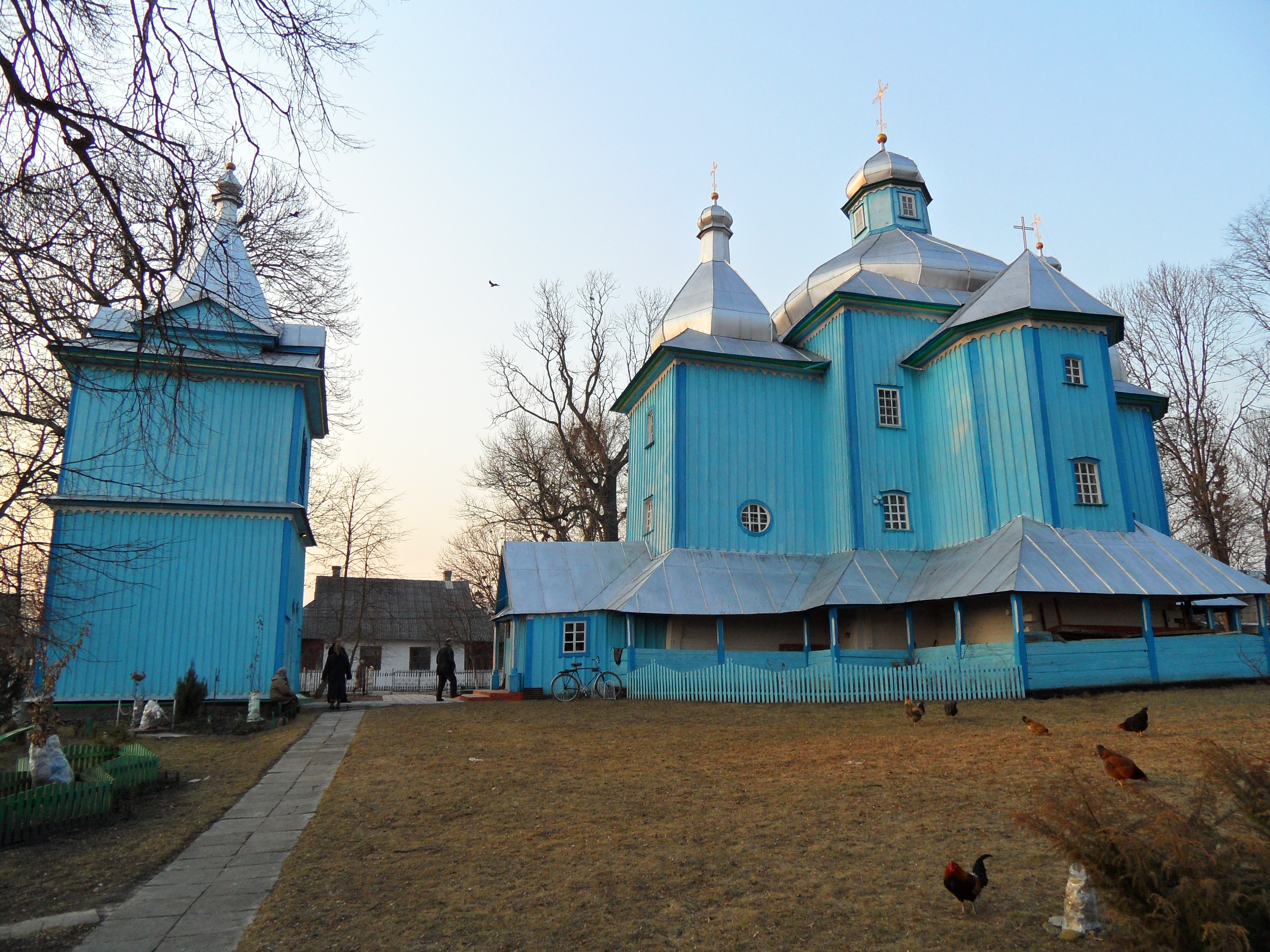
- Holy Trinity Church

- Flag Coat of arms

- Location of Stepan in Ukraine Stepan (Ukraine)
- Coordinates: 51°07′42″N 26°18′15″E
- Country: Ukraine
- Oblast: Rivne Oblast
- Raion: Sarny Raion
- Hromada: Stepan settlement hromada
- Founded: 1861
- Town status: 1980

Government
  - Town Head: Volodymyr Sydorchuk

Area
  - Total: 3.33 km^{2} (1.29 sq mi)
- Elevation: 164 m (538 ft)

Population (2001)
  - Total: 4,073
  - Density: 1,220/km^{2} (3,170/sq mi)
- Time zone: UTC+2 (EET)
  - Summer (DST): UTC+3 (EEST)
- Postal code: 34560
- Area code: +380 3655
- Website: http://rada.gov.ua/

Stepan (Ukrainian: Степань; Polish: Stepań; Hebrew: סטפאן) is a rural settlement in Sarny Raion (district) of Rivne Oblast (province) in western Ukraine. Its population was 4,073 as of the 2001 Ukrainian Census. Current population: 4,062 (2022 estimate)

The settlement is located in the historic Volhynia region of Ukraine, on the left bank of the Horyn, a tributary of the Prypiat.

== History ==
The first written mention of Stepan dates back to 1290. In 1900, the Jewish population of Stepan totaled 1,854. During the World War II occupation of Ukraine, the Nazi German occupying forces established a Jewish ghetto, where nearly 3000 Jews were killed. In 1960, Stepan acquired the status of an urban-type settlement. On 26 January 2024, a new law entered into force which abolished this status, and Stepan became a rural settlement.

== People from Stepan ==
- Stanisław Gabriel Worcell (1799–1857), socialist Polish revolutionary

== See also ==
- Klesiv, the other former urban-type settlement in Sarny Raion of Rivne Oblast
