= Klesiv =

Rural locality in Rivne Oblast, Ukraine

Klesiv Клесів
- Rural settlement
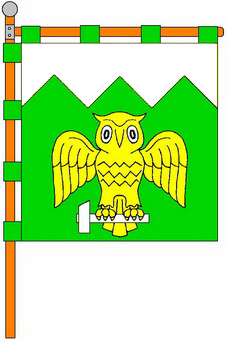
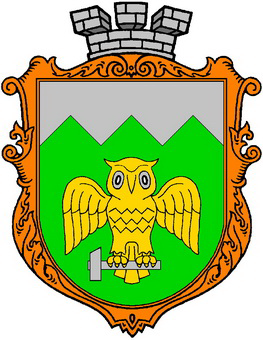
- Flag Coat of arms

- Location of Klesiv in Ukraine Klesiv (Ukraine)
- Coordinates: 51°19′03″N 26°53′41″E
- Country: Ukraine
- Oblast: Rivne Oblast
- Raion: Sarny Raion
- Hromada: Klesiv settlement hromada
- Founded: 1902
- Town status: 1940

Government
  - Town Head: Viktor Buinyi

Area
  - Total: 6.84 km^{2} (2.64 sq mi)
- Elevation: 157 m (515 ft)

Population (2022)
  - Total: 4,566
  - Density: 668/km^{2} (1,730/sq mi)
- Time zone: UTC+2 (EET)
  - Summer (DST): UTC+3 (EEST)
- Postal code: 34550
- Area code: +380 3655
- Website: http://rada.gov.ua/

Klesiv (Ukrainian: Клесів; Polish: Klesów) is a rural settlement in Sarny Raion (district) of Rivne Oblast (province) in western Ukraine. Population: 4,566 (2022 estimate).

== Geography ==
Klesiv lies in the historical region of Volhynia, part of the geographic area of Polesia.

== History ==
Klesiv was first founded in the beginning of the 20th century. It was a settlement in Volhynia Governorate of the Russian Empire.

In the Second Polish Republic the settlement was part of the Volhynian Voivodeship. After the Soviet annexation of Western Ukraine, Klesiv acquired the status of an urban-type settlement in 1940.

Since July 1941 until January 1944 it was occupied by Axis troops.

In January 1989 the population was 5107 people.

In 2013 the population was 4639 people.

On 26 January 2024, a new law entered into force which abolished the status of urban-type settlement, and Klesiv became a rural settlement.

== Economy ==
Klesiv is an industrial centre specializing on brick production and procession of granite. There are placer deposits of Rovno amber from the Oligocene Mezhigorje Formation in the area.

== See also ==
- Stepan, the other urban-type settlement in Sarny Raion of Rivne Oblast
