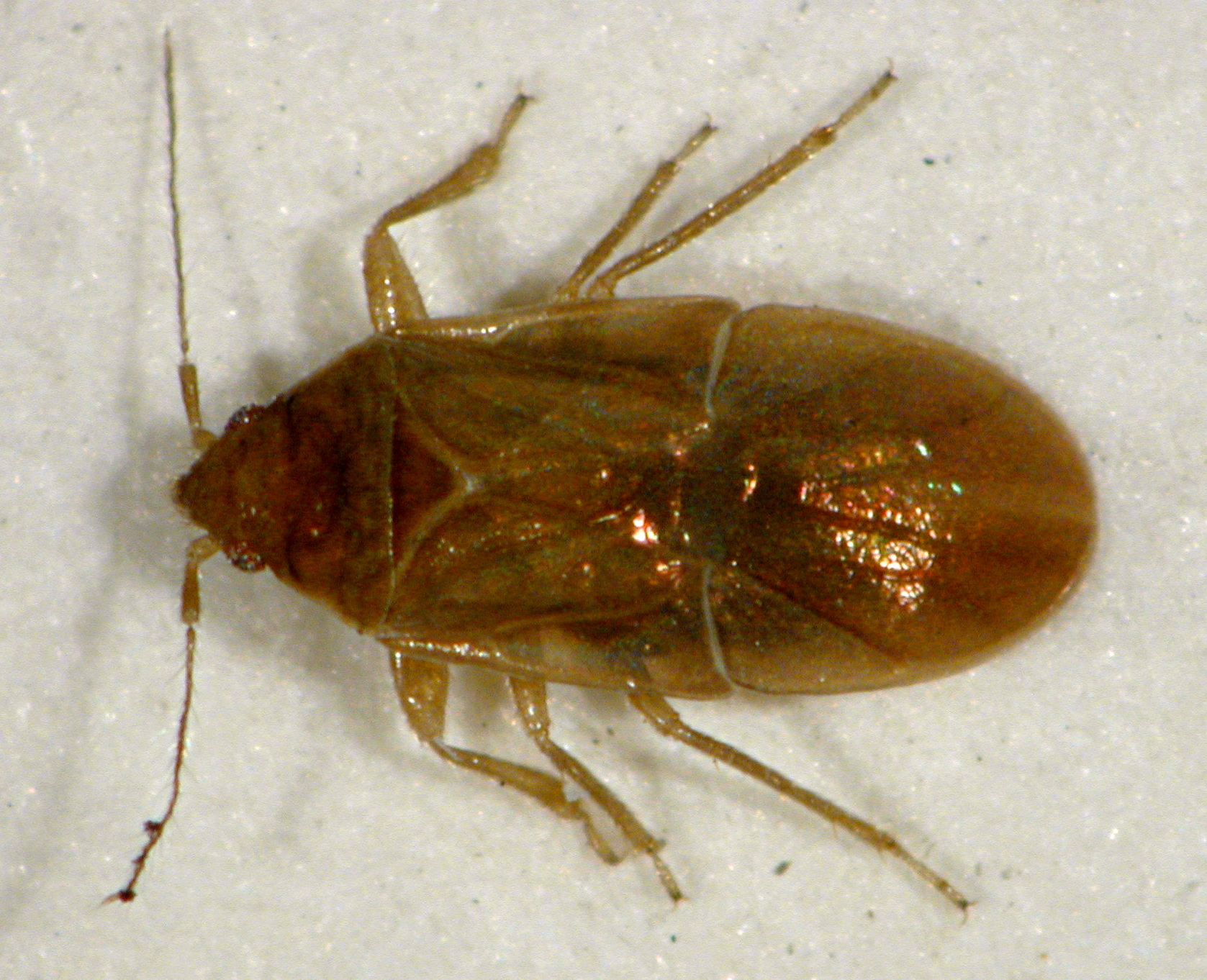
- Cryptostemma sp. (female)

Scientific classification
- Domain: Eukaryota
- Kingdom: Animalia
- Phylum: Arthropoda
- Class: Insecta
- Order: Hemiptera
- Suborder: Heteroptera
- Family: Dipsocoridae
- Genus: Cryptostemma; Herrich-Schäffer, 1835

Synonyms
- Dipsocoris Haliday, 1855

= Cryptostemma =

Genus of insects

Cryptostemma is a genus of bugs in the family Dipsocoridae, first described by Herrich-Schäffer in 1835. The species Cryptostemma alienum is recorded from northern Europe including the British Isles.

== Species ==
According to BioLib the following are included:

1. Cryptostemma alienum Herrich-Schäffer, 1835
2. Cryptostemma carpaticum Josifov, 1967
3. Cryptostemma digitum Wu, 1967
4. †Cryptostemma eocenica Hartung et al., 2017
5. Cryptostemma gracile Josifov, 1967
6. Cryptostemma haywardi Wydgodzinsky, 1952
7. Cryptostemma hickmani Hill, 1987
8. Cryptostemma linguata Nieser, 1973
9. Cryptostemma miyamotoi Yamada & Hayashi, 2019
10. Cryptostemma monga Hill, 1987
11. Cryptostemma pavelstysi Yamada & Hayashi, 2019
12. Cryptostemma remanei Josifov, 1964
13. Cryptostemma roubali Josifov, 1967
14. Cryptostemma triacanthota Hill, 1987
15. Cryptostemma uhleri McAtee & Malloch, 1925
16. Cryptostemma uriarra Hill, 1987
17. Cryptostemma usingeri Wygodzinsky, 1955
18. Cryptostemma utnapishtim Linnavuori, 1984
19. Cryptostemma wygodzinskyi Wu, 1967
