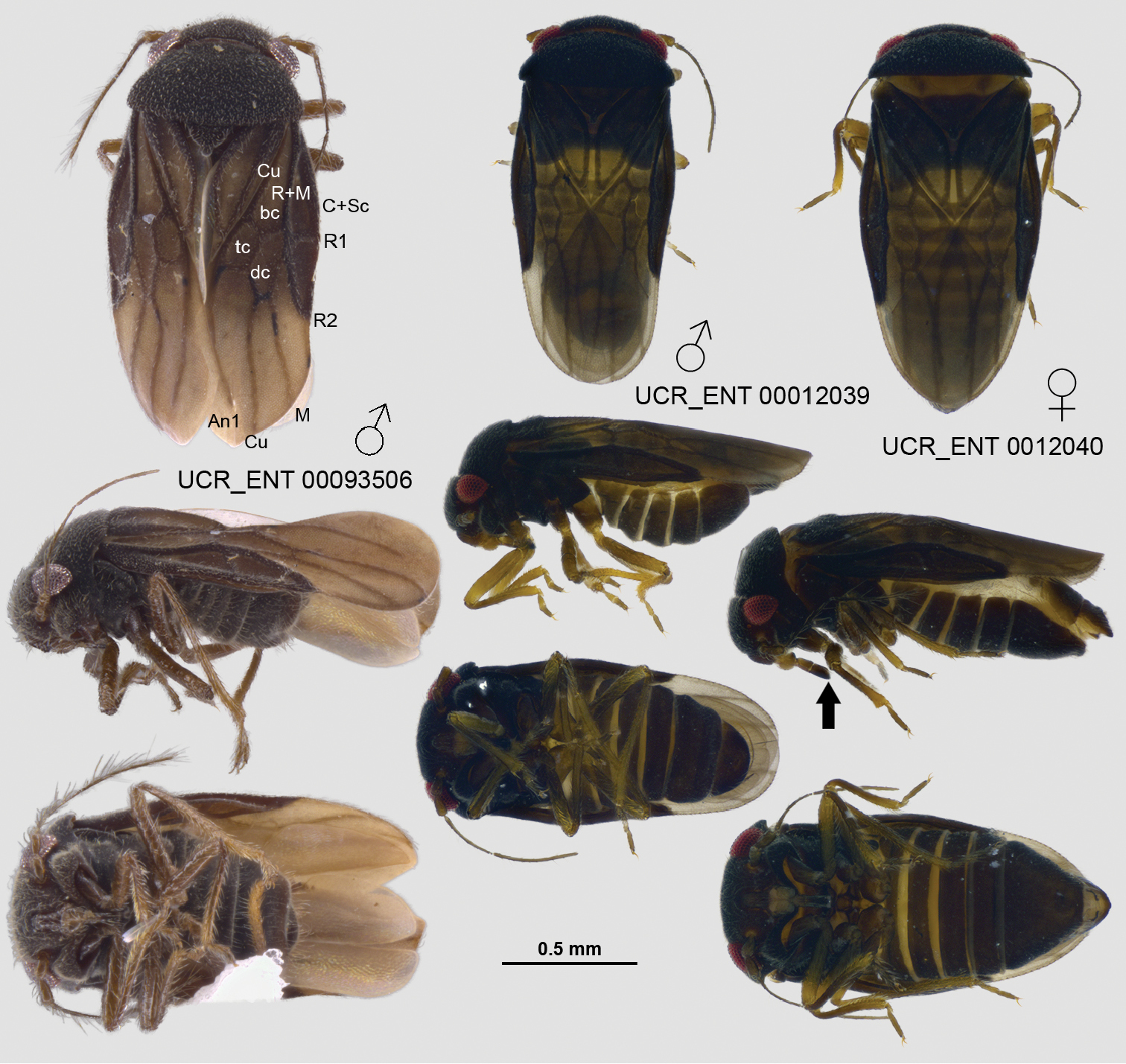
- Corixidea major

Scientific classification
- Kingdom: Animalia
- Phylum: Arthropoda
- Class: Insecta
- Order: Hemiptera
- Suborder: Heteroptera
- Infraorder: Dipsocoromorpha
- Family: Schizopteridae; Reuter, 1891

Subfamilies
- Schizopterinae; Ogeriinae; Hypselosomatinae

= Schizopteridae =

Schizopteridae Temporal range: Barremian–Recent

Family of true bugs

Schizopteridae is the largest family in the infraorder Dipsocoromorpha and comprises 56 genera and approximately 255 species. Schizopterids are some of the smallest (0.5–2.0 mm) true bugs. Members of this family can be distinguished by their small size, enlarged forecoxae and varying degree of abdominal and genitalic asymmetry in males. Schizopteridae exhibit a wide range of simple and complex wing venation patterns. The group is currently divided into three subfamilies: Schizopterinae, Ogeriinae and Hypselosomatinae.

== Distribution ==
The distribution of schizopterid species is primarily tropical, but a substantial number of species have been described from the Australian continent (~25%). In the New World, schizopterid species distribution ranges from the southern states of the United States to northern Argentina. Several species have been described from tropical Africa, and it is estimated that dozens are yet to be described.

== Biology ==
Schizopterids are typically collected from rainforest leaf litter; some species have been associated with very specialized microhabitats, such as decaying palms and bark.

== Genera ==
These 16 genera belong to the family Schizopteridae:

- Buzinia Perrichot, Nel & Neraudeau, 2007^{g}
- Carinatala^{g}
- Corixidea Reuter, 1891^{i c g b}
- Dextritubus^{g}
- Glyptocombus Heidemann, 1906^{i c g b}
- Hypselosoma^{c g}
- Hypselosomops^{g}
- Hypsohapsis^{g}
- Libanohypselosoma Azar & Nel, 2010^{g}
- Nannocoris Reuter, 1891^{i c g}
- Ogeria Distant, 1913^{g}
- Parvodeceptor^{g}
- Schizoptera Fieber, 1860^{i c g}
- Silhouettanus Emsley, 1969^{g}
- Tanaia Perrichot, Nel & Neraudeau, 2007^{g}
- Williamsocoris Carpintero & Dellapé, 2006^{g}

Data sources: i = ITIS, c = Catalogue of Life, g = GBIF, b = Bugguide.net

=== Fossil genera ===
- Subfamily Hypselosomatinae
  - †Buzinia Perrichot et al. 2007 Charentese amber, France, Cenomanian
  - †Kachinia Chen and Wang 2018 Burmese amber, Myanmar, Cenomanian (Note: this genus is an unresolved homonym of the spider genus Kachinia, also published in 2018)
  - †Libanohypselosoma Azar and Nel 2010 Lebanese amber, Barremian
  - †Tanaia Perrichot et al. 2007 Burmese amber, Myanmar, Cenomanian
- †Hexaphlebia Poinar 2015 Burmese amber, Myanmar, Cenomanian
- †Lumatibialis Poinar 2015 Burmese amber, Myanmar, Cenomanian
