= List of organisms named after famous people (born before 1800) =

In biological nomenclature, organisms often receive scientific names that honor a person. A taxon (e.g. species or genus; plural: taxa) named in honor of another entity is an eponymous taxon, and names specifically honoring a person or persons are known as patronyms. Scientific names are generally formally published in peer-reviewed journal articles or larger monographs along with descriptions of the named taxa and ways to distinguish them from other taxa. Following rules of Latin grammar, species or subspecies names derived from a man's name often end in -i or -ii if named for an individual, and -orum if named for a group of men or mixed-sex group, such as a family. Similarly, those named for a woman often end in -ae, or -arum for two or more women.

This list is part of the List of organisms named after famous people, and includes organisms named after famous individuals born before 1 January 1800. It also includes ensembles in which at least one member was born before that date; but excludes companies, institutions, ethnic groups or nationalities, and populated places. It does not include organisms named for fictional entities, for biologists, paleontologists or other natural scientists, (Note: Alexander von Humboldt, for instance, has over 400 eponymous organisms.) nor for associates or family members of researchers who were not otherwise notable (exceptions are made, however, for natural scientists who are much more famous for other aspects of their lives, such as, for example, writer Johann Wolfgang von Goethe).

Organisms named after famous people born later can be found in:

- List of organisms named after famous people (born 1800–1899)
- List of organisms named after famous people (born 1900–1924)
- List of organisms named after famous people (born 1925–1949)
- List of organisms named after famous people (born 1950–1974)
- List of organisms named after famous people (born 1975–present)

The scientific names are given as originally described (their basionyms); subsequent research may have placed species in different genera, or rendered them taxonomic synonyms of previously described taxa. Some of these names may be unavailable in the zoological sense or illegitimate in the botanical sense due to senior homonyms already having the same name.

== List (people born before 1800) ==
Yellow background shading indicates that this taxon name has been subsequently modified (e.g. species transferred to a different genus), but the eponymy is still valid
Pink background shading indicates that this taxon name is invalid because of homonymy, or has been synonymised and is no longer in use, or is considered a nomen dubium

| Taxon | Type | Namesake | Notes | Taxon image | Namesake image | Ref |
|---|---|---|---|---|---|---|
| Abditusdyadus khayyammii † Ghavidel-Syooki & Piri-Kangarshahi, 2021 | Cryptospore | Omar Khayyam | A cryptospore from the Ordovician of Razavi Khorasan, Iran, whose name "Refers to Omar Khayyam Neyshaburi, a Persian mathematician, astronomer, and poet (born on May 18, 1048, ACE in Neyshabur [, Razavi Khorasan province]; died on December 4, 1131 ACE in the same city)." | | | |
| Abelopsocus Schmidt & New, 2008 | Barklouse | Abel Tasman | "The generic name is a combination of the name Abel, after the Dutch seafarer, explorer, and merchant Abel Tasman, and Psocus, a genus of Psocidae." | | | |
| Aberrapex sanmartini Menoret, Mutti & Ivanov, 2017 | Tapeworm | José de San Martín | A parasite of the Southern eagle ray, collected from the coast of Argentina and "named after José de San Martín, one of the leaders of South America's successful struggle for independence from Spain." | | | |
| Abies cuitlahuacii † Cevallos-Ferriz, Ríos-Santos & Lozano-García | Conifer | Cuitláhuac | A fossil fir from the Pleistocene of Lake Chalco, Mexico; "The specific epithet honors Cuitláhuac, the penultimate "Huey Tlatoani"; a Nahuatl expression that refers to governors of the triple alliance (Tenochtitlán-Texcoco-Tlacopan) of the regions where the lake system occurred." | | | |
| Ablerus grotiusi Girault, 1913 | Wasp | Hugo Grotius | | | | |
| Acanthobothrium atahualpai Marques, Brooks & Barriga, 1997 | Tapeworm | Atahualpa | A parasite of stingrays found in Southern Ecuador. | | | |
| Acaphyllisa rakoczii Ripka, 2009 | Mite | Francis II Rákóczi | A shrub-infesting mite found in Hungary, "named in honour of Ferenc Rákóczi II (1676–1735), ruling prince of Transylvania and commander of Hungarian insurgent forces (1704–1711)." | | | |
| Achaemenothrombium Saboori, Wohltmann & Hakimitabar, 2010 | Mite | Achaemenes | A genus of mites found in Iran; its name "is derived from the name Achaemenes (7th century BC, Persian king), traditional founder of the Achaemenid Empire (ca. 550–330 BC), also known as the Persian Empire which at the height of its power encompassed approximately eight million km^{2}." | | | |
| Achaemenothrombium cyrusi Saboori, Wohltmann & Hakimitabar, 2010 | Mite | Cyrus the Great | This species is native to Iran, and "named for Persian king, Cyrus the great (c. 600 BC or 576 BC – December 530 BC), also known as Cyrus II or Cyrus of Persia." | | | |
| Achaemenothrombium dariusi Saboori, Wohltmann & Hakimitabar, 2013 | Mite | Darius the Great | This species is native to Iran, and "named for the third king of the Persian Achaemenid Empire, Darius the Great or Darius I (550–486 BC) who ruled the empire at its peak" | | | |
| Achaemenothrombium khashayarshahi Noei, 2022 | Mite | Xerxes I | This species is native to Iran, and "is named for the fourth king of the Persian Achaemenid Empire, Xerxes I (Khashayar) (c.518–August 465 BC), commonly known as Xerxes the Great, ruling from 486 to 465 BC. He was the son and successor of Darius the Great [...] and his mother was Atossa, a daughter of Cyrus the Great [...], the founder of the Achaemenid empire. Also, the previous described species (A. cyrusi, and A. dariusi) were named for this reason." | | | |
| Aciculaspio anaximanderi Blake & Ramey-Balci, 2020 | Polychaete worm | Anaximander | "The specific name anaximanderi is derived from both the region of its discovery, the undersea Anaximander Seamounts [located near Turkey], and the Greek philosopher of the 6th century B.C. Anaximander (610–546 B.C.) for which the site was named. Anaximander was an early Pre-Socratic philosopher from the Greek city of Miletus in Ionia (modern-day Turkey)." | | | |
| Acylophorus hatuey Bierig, 1938 | Beetle | Hatuey | A species of rove beetle native to Cuba. | | | |
| Adaina atahualpa Gielis, 2011 | Moth | Atahualpa | A plume moth native to Colombia and Ecuador. | | | |
| Adelius quiteriae Souza-Gessner, Cerântola & Penteado-Dias, 2019 | Wasp | Maria Quitéria | A parasitoid wasp from Brazil, "named in honor to Maria Quitéria de Jesus, first ♀ military to fight at war in Brazilian history." | | | |
| Adelomelon caupolicani † Nielsen & Frassinetti, 2007 | Sea snail | Caupolicán | A fossil species from the Miocene of southern Chile. | | | |
| Adelomelon colocoloi † Nielsen & Frassinetti, 2007 | Sea snail | Colocolo | A fossil species from the Miocene of southern Chile. | | | |
| Adelphenaldis grimmorum Fischer, 2014 | Wasp | Brothers Grimm | "Named on the occasion of the 150th anniversary of Jacob and Wilhelm Grimm, best known for their fairy tales (Jacob Grimm died 20 September 1863)."; Subsequently transferred to the genus and subgenus Aspilota (Eusynaldis). | | | |
| Aeolidiopsis elcanoi Ortea & Moro, 2020 | Sea slug | Juan Sebastián Elcano | "Named in honor of Juan Sebastián Elcano, who captained the voyage back from the Philippines of the Nao Victoria, on which he completed the first circumnavigation of the world, on the 500th anniversary of the feat (1519-1521) that began with Ferdinand Magellan. His name is also that of the Spanish Navy training ship, to which we also want to pay a well-deserved tribute with this new species that, due to its uniqueness, will once again travel around the world." | | | |
| Aeschylia Girault, 1929 | Wasp | Aeschylus | | | | |
| Aesopichthys † Poplin & Lund, 2000 | Fish | Aesop | A fossil genus from the Carboniferous of Montana, US, "Named for the Greek teller of fables, Aesop, universally known for his hump, evoking that of the fish here described, and ιχθύς, fish." | | | |
| Agathidium cortezi Miller & Wheeler, 2005 | Beetle | Hernán Cortés | "This species is named after the great Spanish explorer and conquistador Hernan Cortez [sic] who explored much of Mexico, conquered the local regime, and whose deeds and motivations remain somewhat controversial." This species is native to Oaxaca, Mexico. | | | |
| Agathidium pocahontasae Miller & Wheeler, 2005 | Beetle | Pocahontas | "This species is named pocahontasae after a county in [West] Virginia from which numerous type specimens were collected and after the young woman Pocahontas, who may have saved the struggling Jamestown Colony by marrying John Rolfe, thereby establishing a peace between Jamestown colonists and the tribes of Powhatan." | | | |
| Alaptus newtoni Girault, 1912 | Wasp | Isaac Newton | | | | |
| Alcathoe cuauhtemoci Krogmann & Riefenstahl, 2004 | Moth | Cuauhtémoc | A clearwing moth from Mexico, "dedicated to the last Aztec emperor, Cuauhtémoc, executed by the Spanish conquerors under Hernán Cortés in 1525 and still venerated by the Mexicans." | | | |
| Alibashites ferdowsii † Korn et al., 2015 | Ammonite | Ferdowsi | A fossil from the Permian of the Aras river valley, on the border between Iran and Azerbaijan, named "After Hakim Abuʼl-Qasim Ferdowsi Tusi (940-1020), important and influential Persian poet and author of the epic Shahnameh." | | | |
| Aligheria Girault, 1928 | Wasp | Dante Alighieri | Subsequently synonymised with Callimomoides. | | | |
| Aligherinia Girault, 1922 | Wasp | Dante Alighieri | Subsequently synonymised with Eupelmophotismus. | | | |
| Alophophion mancocapaci Alvarado, 2014 | Wasp | Manco Cápac | "The species epithet mancocapaci refers to Manco Capac, the first ruler of the Tawantinsuyu." This, and all thirteen Alophophion species named after the thirteen Sapa Incas, were collected in Peru. | | | |
| Alophophion sinchirocai Alvarado, 2014 | Wasp | Sinchi Roca | "The species epithet sinchirocai refers to Sinchi Roca, the second ruler of the Tawantinsuyu." | | | |
| Alophophion lloqueyupanquii Alvarado, 2014 | Wasp | Lloque Yupanqui | "The species epithet lloqueyupanquii refers to Lloque Yupanqui, the third ruler of the Tawantinsuyu." | | | |
| Alophophion maytacapaci Alvarado, 2014 | Wasp | Mayta Cápac | "The species epithet maytacapaci refers to Mayta Capac, the fourth ruler of the Tawantinsuyu." | | | |
| Alophophion capacyupanquii Alvarado, 2014 | Wasp | Cápac Yupanqui | "The species epithet capacyupanquii refers to Cápac Yupanqui, the fifth ruler of the Tawantinsuyu." | | | |
| Alophophion incarocai Alvarado, 2014 | Wasp | Inca Roca | "The species epithet incarocai refers to Inca Roca, the sixth ruler of the Tawantinsuyu and first inca." | | | |
| Alophophion yahuarhuacaci Alvarado, 2014 | Wasp | Yawar Waqaq | "The species epithet yahuarhuacaci refers to Atahualpa [sic; likely an editing error, meant to say Yáhuar Huácac], the seventh ruler of the Tawantinsuyu and first inca [sic; likely an editing error, meant to say second inca, or be omitted altogether]." | | | |
| Alophophion wiracochai Alvarado, 2014 | Wasp | Viracocha Inca | "The species epithet wiracochai refers to Wiracocha, the eighth ruler of the Tawantinsuyu." | | | |
| Alophophion pachacutii Alvarado, 2014 | Wasp | Pachacuti | "The species epithet pachacutii refers to Pachacuti, the ninth ruler of the Tawantinsuyu." | | | |
| Alophophion yupankii Alvarado, 2014 | Wasp | Topa Inca Yupanqui | "The species epithet yupankii refers to Túpaq Inka Yupanki, the tenth ruler of the Tawantinsuyu." | | | |
| Alophophion huaynacapaci Alvarado, 2014 | Wasp | Huayna Capac | "The species epithet huaynacapac refers to Huayna Cápac, the eleventh ruler of the Tawantinsuyu." | | | |
| Alophophion huascari Alvarado, 2014 | Wasp | Huáscar | "The species epithet huascari refers to Huascar, the twelfth ruler of the Tawantinsuyu." | | | |
| Alophophion atahualpai Alvarado, 2014 | Wasp | Atahualpa | "The species epithet atahualpai refers to Atahualpa, the last ruler of the Tawantinsuyu." | | | |
| Alsasuacaris nostradamus † Bakel, Jagt, Fraaije & Artal, 2011 | Crustacean | Nostradamus | A fossil cyclid from the Cretaceous of Northern Spain. "Nostradamus, Latinised name of Michel de Nostredame (1503–1566), French seer, well known for his prophecies published in his book Les Prophéties. His name [...] has been chosen because the presence of cyclids in the Alsasua area was predicted by one of us (RHBF) one year prior to the discovery of the holotype of the new taxon." | | | |
| Alvania josephineae † Landau, Ceulemans & Van Dingenen, 2018 | Sea snail | Empress Joséphine | A fossil species from the Miocene of western France. | | | |
| Alvania napoleoni † Landau, Ceulemans & Van Dingenen, 2018 | Sea snail | Napoleon | A fossil species from the Miocene of western France. | | | |
| Amblyaspis tipusultani Veenakumari & Buhl, 2013 | Wasp | Tipu Sultan | "named after Tipu Sultan the ruler of the 'Kingdom of Mysore', who died defending his fort at Srirangapattana." (The type locality) | | | |
| Ami yupanquii Pérez-Miles, Gabriel & Gallon, 2008 | Spider | Topa Inca Yupanqui | "The specific epithet is a patronym in honor of the Inca leader, Tupac Yupanqui, who unified the agricultural populations of Ecuador"; The holotype for this species was collected near Puyo, Ecuador. This species was subsequently transferred to the genus Neischnocolus Petrunkevitch, 1925. | | | |
| Ammophila cleopatra Menke, 1964 | Wasp | Cleopatra VII | | | | |
| Amoturella saintpierrei Girault, 1913 | Wasp | Charles-Irénée Castel de Saint-Pierre | | | | |
| Amphisbaena tiaraju Perez & Borges-Martins, 2019 | Lizard | Sepé Tiaraju | "The species is named after the South-American Indigenous warrior Sepé Tiaraju, supposedly born around 1723, leader of the "Sete Povos das Missões", a set of seven indigenous settlements founded by the Spanish Jesuits in northwest Rio Grande do Sul, Brazil. Sepé Tiaraju is a Guaraní hero, symbol of indigenous sentiment of liberty, but he was also part of the gaucho folklore traditions, immortalized in many regional literary works. [...] The tribute was a reference to the restricted distribution of the species to the "Missões" region." | | | |
| Anabaena hatueyi Komárek, 2005 | Bacterium | Hatuey | This species of freshwater cyanobacterium is endemic to Cuba. | | | |
| Anacaona (insect) Yong, 2019 | Katydid | Anacaona | This monotypic genus is endemic to Hispaniola and "named after Anacaona (born in 1474, murdered by hanging in 1503), the well-known Taino woman that ruled the Jaragua chiefdom in Hispaniola and was also said to be the greatest Caribbean beauty" | | | |
| Anacaona (plant) Alain | Flowering plant | Anacaona | This cucurbit genus was described from specimens collected in the Dominican Republic and given "the name of a famous Indian Queen, at the time of the discovery and the conquest of the Island of Hispaniola, or Quisqueya."; Subsequently synonymised with Penelopeia. | | | |
| Anacroneuria amaru Stark, 2004 | Stonefly | Túpac Amaru | This species is native to Bolivia. | | | |
| Anacroneuria cusi Stark, 2004 | Stonefly | Titu Cusi | This species is native to Bolivia. | | | |
| Anacroneuria huayna Stark, 2004 | Stonefly | Huayna Capac | This species is native to Peru. | | | |
| Anagyrus cellinini Girault, 1915 | Wasp | Benvenuto Cellini | Subsequently transferred to genus Psyllaephagus. | | | |
| Anagyrus channingi Girault, 1913 | Wasp | William Ellery Channing | Subsequently transferred to genus Psyllaephagus. | | | |
| Anagyrus grotii Girault, 1915 | Wasp | Hugo Grotius | Subsequently transferred to genus Psyllaephagus. | | | |
| Anagyrus hegeli Girault, 1915 | Wasp | Georg Wilhelm Friedrich Hegel | Subsequently transferred to genus Psyllaephagus. | | | |
| Anagyrus penni Girault, 1913 | Wasp | William Penn | Subsequently transferred to genus Psyllaephagus. | | | |
| Anagyrus saintpierrei Girault, 1913 | Wasp | Charles-Irénée Castel de Saint-Pierre | | | | |
| Anaphes kantii Girault, 1912 | Wasp | Immanuel Kant | "Dedicated to Immanuel Kant for his The General Natural History and Theory of the Heavens."; Subsequently transferred to genus Erythmelus. | | | |
| Anaphes laplacei Girault, 1912 | Wasp | Pierre-Simon Laplace | Subsequently transferred to other genera, currently under the genus Ceratanaphes. | | | |
| Anaphes painei Girault, 1912 | Wasp | Thomas Paine | Subsequently transferred to genus Erythmelus. | | | |
| Anaphes saintpierrei Girault, 1913 | Wasp | Charles-Irénée Castel de Saint-Pierre | | | | |
| Ancistrobasis zumbii Lima, Christoffersen & Barros, 2013 | Sea snail | Zumbi dos Palmares | This species was described from specimens collected off the coast of Alagoas, Brazil, and "named after Zumbi from Quilombo dos Palmares, a martyr and last leader of a self-sustaining community of runaway captives evading slavery in the seventeenth century, located in the state of Alagoas, Brazil." | | | |
| Andinorites atahualpai Etonti & Mateu, 2000 | Beetle | Atahualpa | "after Atahualpa, the last Inca, executed in the square of Cajamarca [the type locality], in August 1533." | | | |
| Andrena xuanzangi Tadauchi & Xu, 2003 | Bee | Xuanzang | A species native to Xinjiang, China, "dedicated to Chinese Buddhist priest Xuanzang [...] who traveled with hardships from Changan (Xian at present) to India through Xinjiang Uygur on Silk Road in 629 B.C. [sic, actually AD] in the Tang dynasty and returned with many Buddhist Scriptures in 645 B.C. [sic] and translated into Chinese which were imparted to Japan later." | | | |
| Angeliconana Girault, 1922 | Wasp | Fra Angelico | Subsequently synonymised with Copidosoma. | | | |
| Anisogomphus koxingai Chao, 1954 | Dragonfly | Koxinga | Subsequently transferred to genus Euthygomphus. | | | |
| Anselmella Girault, 1925 | Wasp | Anselm of Canterbury | | | | |
| Antechinus rosamondae Ride, 1964 | Marsupial mammal | Rosamund Clifford | "A triple allusion to red hair, spinifex [which the animal lives and hides among] and Woodstock [a station in Western Australia, the type locality]. Fair Rosamond was by tradition, red-haired and very beautiful. Mistress of Henry II, she was kept hidden in "a house of wonderful working, so that no man or woman might come to her..." This maze was at the Royal Manor of Woodstock in Oxfordshire."; Subsequently transferred to genus Dasykaluta. | | | |
| Anthobium confucii Shavrin & Smetana, 2018 | Beetle | Confucius | A rove beetle native to China. | | | |
| Apenes toussainti Ball & Shpeley, 2009 | Beetle | Toussaint Louverture | A species of ground beetle native to Hispaniola, named "to honor the memory of the enlightened, self-educated Toussaint L'Ouverture (1743[?]–1803), formerly a slave, who became the most influential leader of the revolution that overthrew the erstwhile ruling European powers, and led to the foundations of an independent Haiti." | | | |
| Aphaenogaster charesi Salata & Borowiec, 2016 | Ant | Chares of Lindos | A species endemic to the island of Rhodes and "Named after Chares of Lindos, a Greek sculptor born on the island of Rhodes. Chares constructed the Colossus of Rhodes in 282 BC, one of the Seven Wonders of the Ancient World." | | | |
| Aphelinoidea painei Girault, 1912 | Wasp | Thomas Paine | "Respectfully dedicated to Thomas Paine, one of the manly defenders of truth and reason and author of the Rights of Man and The Age of Reason." | | | |
| Aphelinus grotiusi Girault, 1913 | Wasp | Hugo Grotius | Subsequently transferred to the genus Centrodora. | | | |
| Aphelinus miltoni Girault, 1915 | Wasp | John Milton | Subsequently transferred to the genus Centrodora. | | | |
| Aphelochaeta palmeri Blake, 2018 | Polychaete worm | Nathaniel Palmer | A marine species found in the Southern Ocean, "named after Nathaniel B. Palmer, American whaler, who is reputed to be among the first to sight the Antarctic continent." | | | |
| Apistogramma atahualpa Römer 1997 | Fish | Atahualpa | A freshwater cichlid native to Peru, named after Atahualpa, the last ruling Inca, who was strangled in 1533 on the order of Spanish conquistador Pizarro; this murder is a "perfect metaphor for the continuing destruction of the cultures of the indigenous peoples of South America and destruction of their environment by 'modern' man." | | | |
| Apistogramma huascar Römer, Pretor & Hahn, 2006 | Fish | Huáscar | A freshwater cichlid native to Peru, named for the Inca prince Huáscar, brother of the last Inca ruler Atahualpa (commemorated in the name of A. atahualpa, above), referring to "large phenotypical similarity" between the two species, and to their common origin from the region of the Inca state Tahuantinsuyu. | | | |
| Apocyclops ramkhamhaengi Chullasorn, Kangtia, Pinkaew & Ferrari, 2008 | Crustacean | Ram Khamhaeng | A copepod native to Thailand. | | | |
| Apousiella mozarti † García-Alcalde, 2022 | Brachiopod | Wolfgang Amadeus Mozart | A fossil species from the Devonian of Spain, "dedicated to the great composer Wolfgang Amadeus C. Mozart, for the endless pleasure of his music." | | | |
| Aprostocetus platoni Girault, 1915 | Wasp | Plato | | | | |
| Apseudogramma popei Girault, 1915 | Wasp | Alexander Pope | | | | |
| Araneus washingtoni Levi, 1971 | Spider | George Washington | The holotype was collected in Mount Washington; "The species is named after George Washington, as is the mountain". | | | |
| Araucarites pachacuteci † Martínez | Conifer | Pachacuti | A fossil araucarian from the Cretaceous of Cusco Department, Peru, named "in honour [of] Pachakutiq Inka Yupanki (Quechua) [...] the ninth Sapa Inca (1418–1471/1472?) of the kingdom of Cusco which he transformed into the Inca Empire." | | | |
| Archytas Jaennicke, 1867 | Fly | Archytas | | | | |
| Argia iralai Calvert, 1909 | Damselfly | Domingo Martínez de Irala | This species is native to Paraguay. | | | |
| Argoptochus sappho Germann, Borovec & Braunert, 2015 | Weevil | Sappho | This species is endemic to the island of Lesbos. | | | |
| Aristophania Guzman et al., 2023 | Bacterium | Aristophanes | A genus of acetic acid bacteria found in the guts of wasps, and named after the Greek playwright, author of the play The Wasps. | | | |
| Arsinoitherium † Beadnell, 1902 | Embrithopod (an extinct order of mammals) | Arsinoe II | The genus name comes from Queen Arsinoe II, after whom the Faiyum Oasis (Egypt), the region in which the first fossils were found, was called during the Ptolemaic Kingdom. | | | |
| Artigasia † Francis & Mones, 1966 | Rodent | José Gervasio Artigas | A genus of fossil dinomyids from the Pliocene and Pleistocene of Uruguay. The authors wanted to honor the "Father of the Nation" since the first specimens were collected on the year of the bicentennial of his birth (1964). It was later replaced with nomen novum Josephoartigasia Mones, 2007, since the original was an invalid homonym of Artigasia Christie, 1934 (a worm genus named after Brazilian helminthologist Paulo Artigas). | | | |
| Asaphomorphella rousseaui Girault, 1913 | Wasp | Jean Jacques Rousseau | "Respectfully dedicated to Jean Jacques Rousseau for his extract from the Project of Perpetual Peace, by the Abbé Saint-Pierre."; Subsequently synonymised with Ophelosia bifasciata. | | | |
| Asphondylia sanctipetri Urso-Guimarães & de Souza Amorim, 2002 | Fly | Saint Peter | A gall midge from Brazil, "named after Saint Peter, very popular in the Brazilian countryside, because the holotype emerged [on] Saint Peter's day." | | | |
| Aspilota hypatiae Kittel, 2016 | Wasp | Hypatia | Replacement name for Aspilota parallela Fischer, 1976, which was preoccupied by Aspilota parallela Fischer, 1971. | | | |
| Astata cleopatra Puławski, 1959 | Wasp | Cleopatra VII | Described from specimens collected in Egypt. | | | |
| Astata nephertiti Puławski, 1959 | Wasp | Nefertiti | Described from specimens collected in Egypt. Subsequently transferred to genus Dryudella. | | | |
| Asterocheres angelicae Bahiana, Farias, Neves & Johnsson, 2025 | Crustacean | Joana Angélica | This copepod species was described from specimens collected from Salvador, Bahia, Brazil, and named "in honor of Sister Joana Angélica, a conceptionist nun and martyr of the Brazilian Independence War, who died when resisting the invasion of the Convent of Lapa [located in Salvador], and has her name included in the book of the Heroes and Heroines of the Country." | | | |
| Asterocheres felipae Bahiana, Farias, Neves & Johnsson, 2025 | Crustacean | Maria Filipa de Oliveira | This copepod species was described from a specimen collected at Itaparica island, Brazil, and named "in honor of Maria Felipa, a black fisherwoman, descendant of enslaved people, who led a group of hundreds of Brazilians civilians to defend Itaparica Island during the Brazilian Independence War. Her name was included in the book of the Heroes and Heroines of the Country." | | | |
| Asterocheres quiteriae Bahiana, Farias, Neves & Johnsson, 2025 | Crustacean | Maria Quitéria | This copepod species was described from specimens collected from Salvador, Bahia, Brazil, and named "in honor of Lieutenant Maria Quitéria, known as the first woman to enlist in the Brazilian army, dressed as a man, during the Brazilian Independence War, and has her name included in the book of the Heroes and Heroines of the Country." Maria Quitéria was from Bahia state and is buried in Salvador. | | | |
| Astyanax atahualpianus Fowler, 1907 | Fish | Atahualpa | Described from specimens collected from the Amazon River in Peru and "Named for Atahualpa, among the last of the unfortunate Incas of Peru, who was strangled by the Spaniards at Cajamarca, Augist 29, 1533"; Subsequently transferred to genus Moenkhausia. | | | |
| Astyanax leonidas Azpelicueta, Casciotta & Almirón, 2002 | Fish | Leonidas I | "The specific epithet leonidas refers to the Spartan King Leonidas who heroically fought a million-man Persian army with only three hundred soldiers. The battle, in which Leonidas lost his life, took place in the narrow pass of Thermopylae. This epithet is dedicated to all the academic teachers of Argentina that stand in defense of a free and independent education." This species, endemic to rivers of northern Argentina, has been subsequently transferred to the genus Psalidodon. | | | |
| Ataulfo O. Pickard-Cambridge, 1895 | Spider | Athaulf | Subsequently synonymised with the species Stemmops bicolor. | | | |
| Atomosia anacaona Scarbrough & Perez-Gelabert, 2006 | Fly | Anacaona | A robber fly from the Dominican Republic, "Named after Anacaona, also called 'golden flower', who was an Indian 'queen' and wife of Caonabo, one of the five 'caciques' of the island of Santo Domingo." | | | |
| Atoposoma grotiusi Girault, 1913 | Wasp | Hugo Grotius | Subsequently transferred to the genus Cirrospilus. | | | |
| Atranus dariushi Muilwijk & Seiedy & Wrase, 2021 | Beetle | Darius the Great | A ground beetle from Iran, whose name "refers to Dariush, king of Persia, of the house of the Achaemenids." | | | |
| Attila Lesson, 1830 | Bird | Attila | A genus of birds in the tyrant flycatcher family, with large heads and hooked bills; they are markedly predatory and aggressive for their size – hence their scientific and common names, which refer to Attila the Hun. | | | |
| Augochlora (Augochloropsis) cleopatra Schrottky, 1902 | Bee | Cleopatra VII | Subgenus Augochloropsis was subsequently promoted to genus status. | | | |
| Auranus leonidas Colmenares, Porto & Tourinho, 2016 | Harvestman | Leonidas I | "named after Leonidas I, king of the Greek state of Sparta, who died fighting against Xerxes I in the Thermopylae battle. He was also characterized as the defender hero in the recent Hollywood movie 300. | | | |
| Auranus xerxes Colmenares, Porto & Tourinho, 2016 | Harvestman | Xerxes I | "named after Xerxes I, who was the fifth great king of the Achaemenid (Persian) Empire from 486–465 BCE. He was also characterized as the villain of the recent Hollywood movie 300. | | | |
| Austrotinodes gusmaoi Dumas, de Souza & Rocha, 2017 | Caddisfly | Bartolomeu de Gusmão | "Dedicated to the Brazilian priest and inventor Bartolomeu Lourenço de Gusmão, who was born [in] Santos, São Paulo state in 1685 and died in 1724. Bartolomeu de Gusmão was the first Brazilian inventor and scientist, famous for the creation in 1709 of the hot air balloon." This species is native to São Paulo state in Brazil. | | | |
| Automeris ahuitzotli Lemaire & Wolfe, 1993 | Moth | Ahuitzotl | "This species is named in memory of Aztec Emperor Ahuitzotl, third Royal son of Montezuma I. Ahuitzotl greatly expanded the Aztec empire, and for the first time extended Aztec control to the Pacific coastal regions of Oaxaca and Guerrero, where this species occurs." | | | |
| Averrhoa L. | Flowering plant | Averroes | The starfruit is a member of this genus. | | | |
| Avicennia L. | Flowering plant | Avicenna | | | | |
| Azygophleps confucianus Yakovlev, 2006 | Moth | Confucius | This species is native to China. | | | |
| Bachiana Strand, 1928 | Wasp | Johann Sebastian Bach | Subsequently synonymised with Endasys. | | | |
| Bachiana Girault, 1940 | Wasp | Johann Sebastian Bach | Subsequently replaced by nomen novum Arzonella. | | | |
| Bacillus aryabhattai Shivaji et al., 2009 | Bacterium | Aryabhata | A bacterium isolated from cryotubes used to collect air samples from the upper atmosphere at altitudes between 27 and 41 km., "named after the renowned Indian astronomer of the 5th century AD". Research was funded by ISRO (Indian Space Research Organisation). Subsequently transferred to genus Priestia. | | | |
| Badezorus ferdowsii Linnavuori, 1997 | True bug | Ferdowsi | A leaf bug from Iran. | | | |
| Balboa Distant, 1893 | True bug | Vasco Núñez de Balboa | | | | |
| Barichneumon cariae Kittel, 2016 | Wasp | Artemisia II of Caria | Replacement name for Barichneumon rufipes (Habermehl, 1920), which had originally been described as Cratichneumon rufipes Habermehl, 1920, but upon being transferred to the genus Barichneumon in 1965, became a junior homonym of Barichneumon rufipes (Cameron, 1907). | | | |
| Bassocaecilius Schmidt & New, 2008 | Barklouse | George Bass | "The generic name is a combination of the name Bass, after the British naval surgeon and explorer George Bass, and Caecilius, a genus of Caeciliusidae."; This genus is endemic to Tasmania. | | | |
| Batillipes dandarae Santos, Rocha, Gomes Jr. & Fontoura, 2017 | Tardigrade | Dandara dos Palmares | A marine species from the coasts of Brazil, named "in honor of "Dandara dos Palmares", an ex-slave warrior, who led the fight against slavery in Brazil in the XVII century." | | | |
| Batis perkeo Neumann, 1907 | Bird | Perkeo of Heidelberg | The pygmy batis, the smallest species of its genus, was named by a German ornithologist after a famous German dwarf. | | | |
| Becquerelia (plant) Brongn. | Flowering plant | Antoine César Becquerel | "Dedicated to the archfamous investigator of the physical world Becquerel, companion of the Academy of Sciences, who through many ingenious experiments has exposed the hidden powers of nature." 64 years later, Adolphe Brongniart's grandson gave the same name to a genus of fossil insects, after Antoine César Becquerel's grandson, Henri Becquerel. (see List of organisms named after famous people (born 1800–1899)) | | | |
| Beethovena Girault, 1932 | Wasp | Ludwig van Beethoven | | | | |
| Beethovenia † García-Alcalde, 2015 | Brachiopod | Ludwig van Beethoven | A fossil genus found in the Devonian of Western Europe. "Dedicated to the greatest of the great musicians, for his unrepeatable symphonic repertoire, Ludwig van Beethoven." | | | |
| Beethovenia bachi † García-Alcalde, 2015 | Brachiopod | Johann Sebastian Bach | A fossil species from the Devonian of Northern Spain. "Dedicated to the sublime German composer Johann Sebastian Bach for his counterpoint mastery that has created so much musical beauty." | | | |
| Beethovenia beethoveni † García-Alcalde, 2015 | Brachiopod | Ludwig van Beethoven | A fossil species from the Devonian of Northern Spain, the type species of the genus Beethovenia. "Dedicated to the extraordinary German composer Ludwig van Beethoven, for the energy and extraordinary vitality of his music." | | | |
| Bembidion cortes Erwin, 1982 | Beetle | Hernán Cortés | A ground beetle native to Mexico and Central America, named "after the sea-faring explorer from Spain who touched the Middle American coast and Caribbean islands in so many places" | | | |
| Berwaldia Larsson, 1981 | Fungus | Franz Berwald | A parasitic microsporidium found in Daphnia pulex collected from a pool in Sweden. | | | |
| Bishopina mozarti Bonaduce et al. 1976 | Crustacean | Wolfgang Amadeus Mozart | Subsequently synonymised with Neocyprideis timorensis (Fyan, 1916). | | | |
| Blastobotrys davincii Visagie et al., 2022 | Yeast | Leonardo da Vinci | "named after Leonardo da Vinci, the famous Italian painter, draughtsman, engineer, scientist, theorist, sculptor, and architect. The species was first detected during a culture-independent survey of fungi associated with his famous self-portrait." Several surveys from around the world reported the same yeast species from a wide range of substrates; apart from Leonardo's iconic drawing, stored in Turin, it was also identified from strains collected from mummies of the Capuchin Catacombs of Palermo, cave paintings of the Maijishan Grottoes, China, and bat caves in the West Coast of the United States, among other origins. | | | |
| Bleda Bonaparte, 1857 | Bird | Bleda | A genus of songbirds in the bulbul family, known as bristlebills. They are found in the forest understorey of western and central Africa. | | | |
| Blighia K. D. Koenig | Flowering plant | William Bligh | This plant genus was erected for the ackee, the national fruit of Jamaica, though it is actually originally native to West Africa, from where it was brought to Jamaica in the 18th century as a source of food for the slaves. Captain Bligh later brought samples of the plant from Jamaica to England, and introduced it to the Royal Society. | | | s |
| Bobbodus xerxesi † Hampe et al., 2013 | Fish | Xerxes I | A fossil species of cartilaginous fish from the Permian of central Iran, named as "A tribute to famous Achaemenian king Xerxes I, who enforced the extension of Persepolis and constructed, among others, the Gate of All Nations and the Hall of a Hundred Columns, the largest and most imposing elements of the central palace there and which deeply impressed the first author." | | | |
| Boccacciomymar Triapitsyn & Berezovskiy, 2007 | Wasp | Giovanni Boccaccio | "The generic name is based on the author of the Decameron, Giovanni Boccaccio. In the wake of what is said to be an almost inevitable worldwide pandemic of bird flu in humans, his masterpiece book may in fact be as contemporary to us as ever. The last name "Boccaccio" is combined with the common ending for many fairyfly genera, "-mymar"." One species in this genus was concurrently named Boccacciomymar decameron. | | | |
| Bolivina lafayettei † McLean, 1956 | Protist | Gilbert du Motier, Marquis de Lafayette | A fossil foraminiferan from the Yorktown Formation (Miocene) of Virginia, "Named in honor of General Lafayette who fought as a volunteer for the cause of American Liberty." | | | |
| Boreogomphodon jeffersoni † Sues & Olsen, 1990 | Cynodont | Thomas Jefferson | A fossil traversodont from the Triassic of Virginia, US; "The specific epithet honors Thomas Jefferson who first described fossil vertebrates from Virginia." | | | |
| Bougainvillea Comm. ex Juss. | Flowering plant | Louis Antoine de Bougainville | This genus was first described by Philibert Commerçon, a botanist accompanying French Navy admiral Louis Antoine de Bougainville during his voyage of circumnavigation of the Earth. | | | |
| Brachylaemus yupanquii Freitas, Kohn & Ibáñez, 1967 | Fluke | Lloque Yupanqui | This species was described from specimens collected in Peru. Genus Brachylaemus was subsequently synonymised with Brachylaima. | | | |
| Brachypanorpa jeffersoni Byers, 1976 | Scorpionfly | Thomas Jefferson | "This species is named in honor of Thomas Jefferson (1743–1826), third president of the United States. The type locality is Mt. Jefferson, North Carolina, and one of the other two known localities (Mt. Rogers-White Top) is in the Jefferson National Forest. Thomas Jefferson was not only an eminent statesman but a scholar with broad interests, among them the natural history of his country. It seems especially appropriate, as we note the nation's bicentennial anniversary, to honor Jefferson, the major author of the Declaration of Independence." | | | |
| Brachypanorpa sacajawea Byers, 1990 | Scorpionfly | Sacagawea | "This species is named for the Shoshone "Bird Woman" Sacajawea (ca. 1790-1884), who with husband and infant son accompanied the Lewis and Clark expedition in 1805–1806 from Fort Mandan (North Dakota) to the mouth of the Columbia River on the Pacific coast, then back. She is said to have had familiarity with many animal and plant species encountered by the explorers. Her knowledge of the mountains of western Montana and northern Idaho aided the expedition in crossing the Bitterroot Range at Lolo Pass to gain access to a tributary of the Snake River and thence to the Columbia." These are the areas in which the specimens were found. | | | |
| Brahea Mart. | Palm | Tycho Brahe | | | | |
| Branchinecta cervantesi Margalef, 1947 | Crustacean | Miguel de Cervantes | A species of freshwater fairy shrimp described from specimens collected in La Mancha, Spain, "dedicated to Cervantes, on the occasion of the 400th anniversary of his birth." Subsequently synonymised with Branchinecta orientalis | | | |
| Brigittea avicenna Zamani & Marusik, 2021 | Spider | Avicenna | A species from Iran "named after Ibn Sina, also known as Avicenna (ca 980–June 1037), a Persian polymath who is regarded as the father of early modern medicine" | | | |
| Bryophryne mancoinca Mamani et al., 2017 | Frog | Manco Inca Yupanqui | A cloud forest landfrog native to Vilcabamba mountain range, Peru, and whose name "refers to the most important Inca of Vilcabamba, Manco Inca, who was the leader of the last Incan resistance in southeastern Peru." | | | |
| Buddhaites † Diener 1895 | Ammonite | Buddha | A fossil found in the Himalayas. The type species is named Buddhaites rama, for the deity Rama. | | | |
| Bulbophyllum bonjolianum Yudistira, Candra & Mustaqim | Orchid | Tuanku Imam Bonjol | This species is endemic to West Sumatra and "named in honour of Tuanku Imam Bonjol, a national hero of Indonesia from West Sumatra Province." | | | |
| Bunaea cleopatra Aurivillius, 1893 | Moth | Cleopatra VII | Subsequently transferred to genus Pseudobunaea. | | | |
| Bythaelurus bachi Weigmann et al., 2016 | Shark | Johann Sebastian Bach | "The new species is named in honor of Johann Sebastian Bach (1685–1750), a musical genius and one of the greatest composers of all time." | | | |
| Bythaelurus vivaldii Weigmann & Kaschner, 2017 | Shark | Antonio Vivaldi | "The new species is named in honor of Antonio Vivaldi (1678–1741), a genius composer of [the] Baroque era, to express its relationship to Bythaelurus bachi, named after sublime genius Johann Sebastian Bach." | | | |
| Bythocypris pythagorasi † Trabelsi et al., 2021 | Crustacean | Pythagoras | A fossil ostracod from the Cretaceous of Tunisia. "Named for the Greek philosopher and mathematician Pythagoras of Samos, after whom the Pythagorean theorem of Euclidean geometry was named, to refer to the geometric (triangular) shape that characterizes the species." | | | |
| Cacicus montezuma Lesson, 1831 | Bird | Moctezuma II | "This beautiful cacique lives in Mexico [...] [and] it recalls the name of a Mexican cacique that history has made famous." Subsequently transferred to genus Psarocolius. | | | |
| Caenaugochlora beethoveni Engel, 1995 | Bee | Ludwig van Beethoven | | | | |
| Calamotropha dagamae Bassi, 2014 | Moth | Vasco da Gama | This species is native to Mozambique, where da Gama was the first European explorer to arrive in 1498, marking the start of Portuguese colonisation of the country. | | | |
| Caligula (moth) Moore, 1862 | Moth | Caligula | | | | |
| Caligula (plant) Klotszch | Flowering plant | Caligula | Subsequently synonymised with the species Agapetes odontocera. | | | |
| Caloboletus guanyui N.K. Zeng, H.Chai & S.Jiang | Fungus | Guan Yu | A mushroom-producing fungus from China and Japan, "named for Guan Yu, a historic Chinese hero, said to have a reddish face, and thus sharing the same color of pores of the species when young." | | | |
| Campanula skanderbegii Bogdanović, Brullo & D. Lakušić | Flowering plant | Skanderbeg | A bellflower species endemic to Albania; "The specific epithet honours George Kastrioti Skanderbeg (1405–1468), national hero of Albania, whose castle stands on the hill where the new species was found." | | | |
| Campoletis bingenae Kittel, 2016 | Wasp | Hildegard of Bingen | Replacement name for Campoletis imperfecta (Viereck, 1925), which had originally been described as Sagaritis imperfectus Viereck, 1925, and was transferred to the genus Campoletis in 1945; when Omorgus imperfectus Kokujev, 1915 was transferred to the same genus in 1965, becoming Campoletis imperfecta (Kokujev, 1915), Campoletis imperfecta (Viereck, 1925) became a junior homonym. | | | |
| Camponotus ashokai Karmaly & Narendran, 2006 | Ant | Ashoka | | | | |
| Camponotus christophei Wheeler & Mann, 1914 | Ant | Henri Christophe | This species is native to Haiti. | | | |
| Camponotus toussainti Wheeler & Mann, 1914 | Ant | Toussaint Louverture | This species is native to Haiti. | | | |
| Campyloneuropsis rhianos Linnavuori, 1997 | True bug | Rhianus | | | | |
| Cancer diogenes Linnaeus, 1758 | Crustacean | Diogenes | A large hermit crab named after Diogenes of Sinope, who was said to live in a clay jar (pithos). Subsequently transferred to the genus Petrochirus. | | | |
| Capoeta birunii Zareian & Esmaeili, 2017 | Fish | Al-Biruni | A freshwater scraper fish found in the Zayandeh River basin in Iran. | | | |
| Capoeta ferdowsii Jouladeh-Roudbar et al., 2017 | Fish | Ferdowsi | A freshwater scraper fish found in the Zohreh and Fahlian rivers in Iran. | | | |
| Capoeta pyragyi Jouladeh-Roudbar et al., 2017 | Fish | Magtymguly Pyragy | A freshwater scraper fish found in the Tireh and Sezar rivers (Tigris basin), Iran. | | | |
| Capoeta razii Jouladeh-Roudbar, Eagderi, Ghanavi & Doadrio, 2017 | Fish | Abu Bakr al-Razi | A freshwater scraper fish found in rivers of the South Caspian Sea basin in Iran, and "named in honour of Abū Bakr Muhammad ibn Zakariyyā al-Rāzī, a Persian polymath, physician, alchemist, and philosopher, for his important contributions in the history of medicine. He also discovered numerous compounds including Ethanol." | | | |
| Captaincookia N.Hallé | Flowering plant | James Cook | Subsequently synonymised with Ixora | | | |
| Carabus jeffersoni † Scudder, 1900 | Beetle | Thomas Jefferson | A fossil ground beetle from the Eocene Florissant Formation, Colorado, US. "Dedicated to the honored memory of President Thomas Jefferson, one of the earliest writers on American paleontology." | | | |
| Carapoia dandarae Huber, 2016 | Spider | Dandara dos Palmares | A cellar spider from Brazil. | | | |
| Carapoia zumbii Huber, 2016 | Spider | Zumbi dos Palmares | A cellar spider from Brazil. | | | |
| Carcinops donelaitisi † Alekseev, 2016 | Beetle | Kristijonas Donelaitis | A fossil clown beetle from Eocene Baltic amber "devoted to the poet Kristijonas Donelaitis [...], who lived in Lithuania Minor [Kleinlitauen, present-day eastern parts of Kaliningrad region] and wrote the first classical poem in Lithuanian language, "Metai" ("The Seasons"), which became one of the principal works of Lithuanian poetry and a classical work of Lithuanian literature." | | | |
| Carebara abuhurayri Sharaf & Aldawood, 2011 | Ant | Abu Hurairah | A species native to Al-Bahah Province, Saudi Arabia, "named after Abuhurayra, the companion of the Prophet, Mohammed, may peace and blessing be upon him, and whose tribe inhabited Al Bahah region." | | | |
| Carlyleia Girault, 1916 | Wasp | Thomas Carlyle | | | | |
| Casanovula Hoare, 2013 | Moth | Giacomo Casanova | A subgenus of Pectinivalva, named "after the famous Italian adventurer and philanderer Giacomo Casanova, in reference to the unusual sexual ornamentation of the males of some species". | | | |
| Casca heracliti Girault, 1936 | Wasp | Heraclitus | "To one of the seed-planting Ionians."; Genus Casca was subsequently synonymised with Pteroptrix. | | | |
| Castrillonia vivaldiana † García-Alcalde, 2015 | Brachiopod | Antonio Vivaldi | A fossil orthid from the Devonian of Spain, "Dedicated to the immortal Venetian Baroque composer and performer, for his immense symphonic works." | | | |
| Caupolicana Spinola, 1851 | Bee | Caupolicán | A genus described from specimens collected in Chile, named "in honor of Caupolicán, the most famous of Chileans who dared to resist the invasions of foreigners and who sacrificed himself for the independence of his tribe." | | | |
| Ceratoneuronella aligherini Girault, 1915 | Wasp | Dante Alighieri | | | | |
| Ceropegia shivrayiana Jangam, Kambale & N.V.Pawar | Flowering plant | Shivaji | "The specific epithet shivrayiana honours the great King of Maratha empire and an unparalleled Warrior Chhatrapati Shivaji Shahaji Bhosale, who was popularly known as Chhatrapati Shivray or Chhatrapati Shivaji Maharaj. He had built and won several forts, which have become important protected sites for several endemic and rare species. Even he had issued mandate for Biodiversity Conservation which is popularly known as 'Adnyapatra'. As this species has been discovered from one of his historical forts Vishalgad, it has been named in his honour." | | | |
| Ceroptres bruti Nastasi, Smith & Davis, 2024 | Wasp | Marcus Junius Brutus | "Named for Marcus Junius Brutus, a Roman politician famous for betraying Julius Caesar in orchestrating his assassination, thereby freeing Rome from Caesar's iron fist." | | | |
| Chaetonotus napoleonicus Balsamo, Todaro & Tongiorgi, 1992 | Hairyback worm | Napoleon | "after the French Emperor Napoleon Bonaparte, who was held in exile on the island of Elba." (the type locality) | | | |
| Chaetozone monteverdii Grosse, Capa & Bakken, 2021 | Polychaete worm | Claudio Monteverdi | "This species is named after Claudio Monteverdi, an Italian composer, author of the operatic scena Il combattimento di Tancredi e Clorinda, amongst other pieces." | | | |
| Charops cavendishae Kittel, 2016 | Wasp | Margaret Cavendish, Duchess of Newcastle-upon-Tyne | Replacement name for Charops ater (Szépligeti, 1910), which had originally been described as Agrypon atrum Szépligeti, 1910, but upon being transferred to the genus Charops in 1961, became a junior homonym of Charops ater Szépligeti, 1908. | | | |
| Charybdis (Goniosupradens) mathiasi † Müller, 1984 | Crustacean | Matthias I of Hungary | A fossil species of swimming crab from the Miocene of Hungary, named after "the Hungarian king Mathias, whose favorite spot was Visegrád, the first known locality of the species." | | | |
| Chasicotatus spinozai † Scillato-Yané, Krmpotic & Esteban, 2010 | Armadillo | Baruch Spinoza | A fossil species from the Miocene of Argentina. | | | |
| Cheiroseius manouchehrii Shamsi & Saboori, 2013 | Mite | Manuchehri | "The species is named in memory of Abu Najm Ahmad ibn Ahmad ibn Qaus Manuchehri (Manouchehri Damghani), a famous Iranian poet (1007−1040 AD) from Damghan, Iran." (the type locality) | | | |
| Cherokeea attakullakulla Quinter & Sullivan, 2014 | Moth | Attakullakulla | | | | |
| Chinocossus marcopoloi Yakovlev, 2006 | Moth | Marco Polo | This species, native to Yunnan, China, "is named in honour of a prominent traveller Marco Polo who undertook an incredible for his time journey to Asia." | | | |
| Chiromachetes ramdasswamii Sulakhe et al', 2020 | Scorpion | Samarth Ramdas | "The species epithet is a patronym honouring Samartha Ramdas Swami, who was a renowned Hindu saint, philosopher, poet, writer, social reformer, and spiritual master of the 17th century. It is believed that he dictated his famous literary trait Dasbodh while residing in a natural cave behind a waterfall known as Shivtharghal, very close to the type locality." | | | |
| Chirotica dumeeae Kittel, 2016 | Wasp | Jeanne Dumée | Replacement name for Chirotica orientalis Kanhekar, 1989, which was preoccupied by Chirotica orientalis Horstmann, 1983. | | | |
| Chirotica eimmartae Kittel, 2016 | Wasp | Maria Clara Eimmart | Replacement name for Chirotica nigriventris Townes, 1983, which was preoccupied by Chirotica nigriventris Horstmann, 1983. | | | |
| Chlerogella cyranoi Engel, 2010 | Bee | Cyrano de Bergerac | A species with an elongated head, named "honoring Hector Savinien de Cyrano de Bergerac (1619–1655), French dramatist who was famously known for his overly large nose." | | | |
| Chlerogella tychoi Engel, 2010 | Bee | Tycho Brahe | A species with an elongated head, named "honoring Danish nobleman and astronomer Tycho Brahe, the Latinized name adopted by Tyge Ottesen Brahe de Knudstrup (1546–1601). During his life Tycho painstakingly catalogued celestial movements, data later used by individuals such as his assistant Johannes Kepler. As a student Tycho lost part of his nose in a duel and he apparently wore a prosthetic nose made of silver and gold, although speculation and evidence exists to suggest it was perhaps made of copper." | | | |
| Chriacus metocometi † Van Valen, 1978 | Arctocyonian (an extinct order of mammals) | Metacomet | | | | |
| Chriacus oconostotae † Van Valen, 1978 | Arctocyonian (an extinct order of mammals) | Oconostota | | | | |
| Cryptocephalus baowenzhengi Duan & Zhou, 2021 | Beetle | Bao Zheng | This species is native to China. | | | |
| Chrysolina confucii Lopatin, 2007 | Beetle | Confucius | A leaf beetle native to Sichuan, China. | | | |
| Chrysolina luluni Bieńkowski, 2024 | Beetle | Lu Lun | A leaf beetle native to Yunnan, China. | | | |
| Chrysolina poloi Bieńkowski, 2024 | Beetle | Marco Polo | A leaf beetle native to Yunnan, China, "named after Marco Polo (1254–1324), Italian explorer, ambassador in China and writer. The name for this species was suggested by my friend M. Daccordi, who presented me the type specimens." | | | |
| Chrysolina riccii Bieńkowski, 2024 | Beetle | Matteo Ricci | A leaf beetle native to Yunnan, China, "named after Matteo Ricci (1552–1610), Italian Jesuit, geographer, mathematics [sic], and sinologist. The name for this species was suggested by my friend M. Daccordi, who presented me the type specimens." | | | |
| Chrysophanus rauparaha Fereday, 1877 | Butterfly | Te Rauparaha | Known as Rauparaha's copper or mokarakare, this species of butterfly, endemic to New Zealand, was first identified from specimens collected in Kaiapoi, and named "after the Māori chief Te Rauparaha, of the history of whose life the siege and capture of Kaiapoi Pā occupies a prominent part." Subsequently transferred to the genus Lycaena. | | | |
| Cicadatra barbodi Mozaffarian & Sanborn, 2013 | Cicada | Barbad | This species is native to Iran and "is named for the Iranian musician Barbod (590–627 A.D.) who introduced his music to the king Khosroparviz while he was hidden in a tree so the king thought the music came from heaven." | | | |
| Cingulina archimedea Melvill, 1896 | Sea snail | Archimedes | "The miniature screw-like appearance suggested the trivial name, after Archimedes, the celebrated Syracusan mathematician, inventor of the screw, who is reported to have taken for his model thereof the well-known Mediterranean shell Turritella terebra, L." | | | |
| Cladophorella netzahualpillii Galicia & E.Novelo | Green alga | Nezahualpilli | This species was described from specimens collected from wells at El Caracol, Lake Texcoco Management, Mexico, and "named in honor of Netzahualpilli (1465-1516), king of Texcoco, admired by his contemporaries as a wise man, constructor, prudent judge and astrologer." | | | |
| Claudius Cope, 1865 | Turtle | Claudius | | | | |
| Clavilithes atahuallpai † Hanna & Israelsky, 1925 | Sea snail | Atahualpa | A fossil species from the Miocene of Peru, "named after Atahuallpa, the last king of the Incas." | | | |
| Cleopatra Troschel, 1856 | Snail | Cleopatra VII | | | | |
| Cleopatrodon † Bown & Simons, 1987 | Ptolemaiidan (an extinct order of mammals) | Cleopatra VII | A fossil genus from the Oligocene of Egypt, named "After Cleopatra VII (?69-30 B.C.), last ruler of Ptolemaic Egypt (in analogy with Ptolemaia, a relative of Cleopatrodon and named for the Ptolemaic dynasty)" | | | |
| Closterocerus saintpierrei Girault, 1913 | Wasp | Charles-Irénée Castel de Saint-Pierre | "This species is respectfully dedicated to the Abbe Saint-Pierre for his The Project of Perpetual Peace." | | | |
| Cobitis emrei Freyhof, Bayçelebi & Geiger, 2018 | Fish | Yunus Emre | A loach from Turkey, "Named for Yunus Emre (about 1238–1320) the folk poet, philosopher and Sufi mystic who is the pioneer of Turkish poetry in Anatolia." | | | |
| Cobitis pirii Freyhof, Bayçelebi & Geiger, 2018 | Fish | Piri Reis | A loach from Turkey, "Named for Piri Reis (1465–1553) the Ottoman admiral, navigator, geographer and cartographer. Piri Reis is known for his world maps showing America and the maritime book called Kitab-ı Bahriye." | | | |
| Coccophagus swifti Girault, 1915 | Wasp | Jonathan Swift | Subsequently transferred to the genus Encarsia. | | | |
| Coiba jeffersoni Kula 2009 | Wasp | Thomas Jefferson | "named in honor of Thomas Jefferson, the third President of the United States of America, for his contributions as a politician, architect, and naturalist." | | | |
| Coleolaelaps ferdowsi Joharchi, 2012 | Mite | Ferdowsi | This species of mite, native to Iran, is parasitic of beetle larvae of genus Polyphylla. "The species is named in memory of Hakim Abol Qasem Ferdowsi Tousi, one of the greatest Persian poets, author of the Shahnameh ("The Epic of Kings"), the Persian national epic." | | | |
| Colona Cav | Flowering plant | Christopher Columbus | "In memory of the famous Christopher Columbus, or rather Colón, as he and his descendants wanted to be known in Spain; who, by a remarkable feat, discovered the New World, completely unknown to the ancients, and so increased the empire of Flora in a wonderful manner. But if botanists make certain plants distinguished by the names of Cookii, Bougainvillea, and other navigators; this new race must be consecrated to the superior title of Columbus, the leader of the navigators of the modern age." | | | |
| Confucius Distant, 1907 | Leafhopper | Confucius | | | | |
| Confuciusornis † Hou, Zhou, Gu & Zhang, 1995 | Bird | Confucius | A genus of primitive birds from the Jurassic of China. The name means "Confucius's bird". | | | |
| Contemptor mastinoi † Calzoni, Giusberti & Carnevale, 2026 | Fish | Mastino I della Scala | A fossil snake mackerel from the Eocene of Verona province, Italy, "named after "Mastino della Scala" (1220–1277), Master of the city of Verona from 1262 to 1277, and in reference to the Italian word "mastino" meaning "mastiff", given the large fangs of this species." | | | |
| Cookia Lesson, 1832 | Sea snail | James Cook | A genus from New Zealand, of which Cook's expeditions reportedly collected the first known specimens. | | | |
| Copernicia Mart. | Palm | Nicolaus Copernicus | | | | |
| Copernicrinus † Płachno et al., 2024 | Feather star | Nicolaus Copernicus | A fossil genus from the Jurassic of Algeria, described in Poland and named "In honour of Mikołaj Kopernik (in Latin: Nicolaus Copernicus), Polish polyhistorian and astronomer, and creator of the heliocentric model of the Solar System, which was published in his book De revolutionibus orbium coelestium. The Senate of the Republic of Poland adopted 2023 as the year of Copernicus." | | | |
| Cosmocomoidea grotiusi Girault, 1913 | Wasp | Hugo Grotius | Subsequently transferred to the genus Agalmopolynema. | | | |
| Cosmolaelaps sejongi Keum, Jung & Joharchi, 2017 | Mite | Sejong the Great | "The species is named in memory of Sejong the Great [...], the fourth king of the Joseon dynasty in [the] Republic of Korea, who encouraged creativity and advancements in scientific technology and under whom the Hangeul (Korean alphabet) was created." This species is native to South Korea. | | | |
| Cotesia parthenayae Kittel, 2016 | Wasp | Catherine de Parthenay | Proposed as replacement name for Cotesia nonagriae (Viereck, 1913), which had been originally described as Apanteles (Stenopleura) nonagriae Viereck, 1913, but, upon being transferred to the genus Cotesia, had become a junior homonym of Cotesia nonagriae (Olliff, 1893). However, Cotesia nonagriae (Viereck, 1913) has been found to be a junior synonym of Cotesia flavipes Cameron 1891, making Kittel's replacement name unnecessary. | | | |
| Cowperia Girault, 1919 | Wasp | William Cowper | | | | |
| Crambus bachi Bassi, 2012 | Moth | Johann Sebastian Bach | | | | |
| Crambus frescobaldii Bassi, 2012 | Moth | Girolamo Frescobaldi | | | | |
| Crambus mozarti Bassi, 2012 | Moth | Wolfgang Amadeus Mozart | | | | |
| Crambus rossinii Bassi, 2012 | Moth | Gioachino Rossini | | | | |
| Crassatellites pizarroi † Hanna & Israelsky, 1925 | Bivalve | Francisco Pizarro | A fossil species from the Miocene of Peru, "named for Francis Pizarro, the Spanish conqueror of Peru."; Subsequently synonymised with Hybolophus nelsoni. | | | |
| Cremastobaeus mahaviraii Veenakumari, 2017 | Wasp | Mahavira | This species is native to India. | | | |
| Cremastobaeus valmikii Veenakumari, 2017 | Wasp | Valmiki | This species is native to India. | | | |
| Crenicichla dandara Varella & Ito 2018 | Fish | Dandara dos Palmares | A pike cichlid from the Xingu River basin in Brazil, "named after an Afro-Brazilian warrior of Brazil's colonial period. According to legend, Dandara and her husband Zumbi fiercely defended the community of Palmares, a safe haven for escaped slaves in the coastal state of Alagoas, Brazil. Nowadays, she has become a symbol of the struggle against racism and the exploitation of black women." | | | |
| Crocidura poensis attila Dollman, 1915 | Shrew | Attila | Subsequently promoted to species status, as Crocidura attila. Commonly known as hun shrew. | | | |
| Crossopriza ibnsinai Huber, 2022 | Spider | Avicenna | A cellar spider native to Central Asia. "The name honors Ibn Sina (also known as Avicenna; ~980–1037), a Persian polymath, physician, astronomer, and thinker." | | | |
| Crossopriza khayyami Huber, 2022 | Spider | Omar Khayyam | A cellar spider native to Western Asia. "The name honors Omar Khayyam (1048–1131), a Persian polymath, mathematician, astronomer, philosopher, and poet." | | | |
| Crux boudica Trewick, 2024 | Camel cricket | Boudica | "After Boudica the renowned warrior queen of the Icene [sic], who is said to have ridden a scythed chariot; in recognition of the unusual 'armaments' carried by the female." | | | |
| Cryptoseius khayyami Kazemi & Moraza, 2008 | Mite | Omar Khayyam | This species was described from specimens collected in Razavi Khorasan province, Iran, where Khayyam's hometown of Nishapur is also located. | | | |
| Cryptus bryanae Kittel, 2016 | Wasp | Margaret Bryan | Replacement name for Cryptus intermedius Ratzeburg, 1852, which was preoccupied by Cryptus intermedius Schiødte, 1839. | | | |
| Culicoides huaynacapaci Felippe-Bauer, 2008 | Fly | Huayna Capac | A species of biting midge native to Peru. | | | |
| Cycladophora goetheana Haeckel 1887 | Protist | Johann Wolfgang von Goethe | Subsequently transferred to genus Podocyrtis. | | | |
| Cyclammina garcilassoi † Frizzell, 1943 | Protist | Inca Garcilaso de la Vega | A fossil foraminiferan from the Cretaceous of Peru. | | | |
| Cyclocephala casanova Ratcliffe & Cave, 2009 | Beetle | Giacomo Casanova | | | | |
| Cyclophora serveti Redondo & Gastón, 1999 | Moth | Michael Servetus | A species of geometer moth (inchworm) native to Spain, "dedicated to the Aragonese humanist Miguel Servet, an active connoisseur of the most diverse areas of human knowledge. He achieved his greatest glory in medicine with the first description, in the West, of the lesser circulation of the blood." The type locality is Torralba de los Frailes in Zaragoza province, Aragón. | | | |
| Cylindroniscus platoi Fernandes, Campos-Filho & Bichuette, 2018 | Crustacean | Plato | | | | |
| Cynips fatihi Azmaz & Katilmiş, 2021 | Wasp | Mehmed II | A gall wasp native to Turkey, named "in honour of Mehmed II (Fatih Sultan Mehmed, known as the Conqueror), who is a genius statesman and leader interested in literature, fine arts, and monumental architecture." | | | |
| Czarnoclymenia ibnrushdi † Korn, 1999 | Ammonite | Averroes | A fossil clymeniid from the Devonian of Morocco, named "After Ibn Rushd (lat. Averroes), *1126 Córdoba, †1198 Marrakech; Arabian physician, philosopher, and commentator on Aristotle (Averroism – theory of the beginningless existence of the world)." | | | |
| Dahlibruchus nezahualcoyotli Romero Nápoles & Romero Ramírez, 2011 | Beetle | Nezahualcoyotl | "The specific epithet refers to Acolmiztli Nezahualcóyotl (1402-1472), King of Tezcoco, known commonly as the Poet King."; This species is native to Mexico, and the holotype was found in Texcotzingo, the royal gardens of Nezahualcoyotl. | | | |
| Dalejinna telemanni † García-Alcalde, 2015 | Brachiopod | Georg Philipp Telemann | A fossil orthid from the Devonian of Spain, "Dedicated to the great 17th century composer Georg Philipp Telemann, probably the most prolific composer in history, particularly for his vibrant and emotive trumpet music." | | | |
| Dasybasis huaynai Gonzalez & Yabar, 2024 | Fly | Huayna Capac | Described from specimens collected in the department of Cusco, Peru. | | | |
| Dasybasis mancoi Gonzalez & Yabar, 2024 | Fly | Manco Cápac | Described from specimens collected in the department of Cusco, Peru. | | | |
| Dasyurus spartacus Van Dyck, 1987 | Marsupial mammal | Spartacus | "The name spartacus embodies many features shared by this dasyurid with the notorious Thracian gladiator — strength, a tenacious fighting spirit, and the capacity to draw blood." | | | |
| Davincia Girault, 1924 | Wasp | Leonardo da Vinci | | | | |
| Demosthenesia A.C.Sm. | Flowering plant | Demosthenes | | | | |
| Dentalina oviedoi † Frizzell, 1943 | Protist | Gonzalo Fernández de Oviedo y Valdés | A fossil foraminiferan from the Cretaceous of Peru, named "in honor of Gonzalo Fernández de Oviedo, contemporary of the Conquest of Peru, whose manuscript reports have been widely quoted." | | | |
| Descampsia Risbec, 1955 | Wasp | Jean-Baptiste Descamps | | | | |
| Descampsina Mesnil, 1956 | Fly | Jean-Baptiste Descamps | | | | |
| Desisopsis magallanesorum Vives, 2012 | Beetle | Ferdinand Magellan | A longhorn beetle native to Mindanao, Philippines, dedicated "in memory of the great explorer Fernão de Magalhães and all of his family members that joined him in the expedition of 1519-1522 and the exploration of the Philippines." | | | |
| Desmopachria bolivari Miller, 1999 | Beetle | Simón Bolívar | A diving beetle from Bolivia, named "in honor of General Simon Bolivar, liberator and first president of Bolivia." | | | |
| Diadegma chateletae Kittel, 2016 | Wasp | Émilie du Châtelet | Replacement name for Diadegma truncatum (Viereck, 1925), which had originally been described as Campoplex (Hyposoter) truncatus Viereck, 1925, but upon being transferred to the genus Diadegma in 1979, became a junior homonym of Diadegma truncatum (Thomson, 1887). | | | |
| Dipoena ohigginsi Levi, 1963 | Spider | Bernardo O'Higgins | This species is native to Chile, and the holotype was found in O'Higgins Region. | | | |
| Discheramocephalus capac Darby, 2016 | Beetle | Huayna Capac | This species is native to Peru. | | | |
| Discomorpha atahualpai Borowiec, 2006 | Beetle | Atahualpa | This species is native to Peru. | | | |
| Discorbis huascari † Frizzell, 1943 | Protist | Huáscar | A fossil foraminiferan from the Cretaceous of Peru, "named for the heir of the Inca dynasty, son of Huayna Capac, executed by Atahuallpa prior to the conquest of Peru." | | | |
| Dolecta karamzini Naydenov, Yakovlev, Penco & Sinyaev, 2020 | Moth | Nikolay Karamzin | | | | |
| Dolecta pushkini Naydenov, Yakovlev, Penco & Sinyaev, 2020 | Moth | Alexander Pushkin | | | | |
| Dolgoma kawila Volynkin & Černý, 2021 | Moth | Kawila | A lichen moth known from Northern Thailand (Chiang Mai and Lampang Provinces) and named after Kawila, a Siamese nobleman who ruled Chiang Mai in the late 18th and early 19th centuries. | | | |
| Doliops elcanoi Vives, 2011 | Beetle | Juan Sebastián Elcano | "We name this species after the great Basque seafarer, Juan Sebastián Elcano (1476-1526), who joined Ferdinand Magellan in his naval expedition, being the first naval officer to circumnavigate the Earth." | | | |
| Doliops urdanetai Vives, 2011 | Beetle | Andrés de Urdaneta | "We name this species after the great Spanish seafarer and member of the Dominican Order, Friar Andrés de Urdaneta y Cerain (Ordícia, 1508 – Ciudad de México, 1568). He was the first to establish the maritime route to return from the Philippines to Mexico, 'El Tornaviaje'" | | | |
| Doronomyrmex pocahontas Buschinger, 1979 | Ant | Pocahontas | "The new species was found and identified while I was staying at Pocahontas Bungalows near the east entrance to Jasper Park, Alberta. Pocahontas is the name of a North American Indian princess (1595-1617) who was born in Virginia [...]. The word means "the playful one" and is descriptive of the problems that I had in identifying the males." Genus Doronomyrmex was subsequently synonymised with Leptothorax. | | | |
| Dracula vlad-tepes Luer & R.Escobar | Orchid | Vlad the Impaler | | | | |
| Drosophila cuauhtemoci Felix et al., 1976 | Fly | Cuauhtémoc | A small fruit fly native to Mexico, "named in honor of Cuauhtémoc, the last emperor of the Aztecs and a national hero of Mexico." | | | |
| Drosophila ruminahuii Vela & Rafael, 2004 | Fly | Rumiñahui | A small fruit fly native to Ecuador, "named in honor of Rumiñahui, an indigenous hero who bravely fought against the Spaniards in the 1500's." | | | |
| Dyadospora ferdowsii † Ghavidel-Syooki & Piri-Kangarshahi, 2021 | Cryptospore | Ferdowsi | A cryptospore from the Ordovician of Razavi Khorasan, Iran, whose name "Refers to Abul-Qâsem Ferdowsi Tusi, a Persian poet and the author of the Shahnameh book, the longest epic poem in the world created by a single poet, and the national epic of Greater Iran (born in 940 ACE in Tus, near Mashhad [in Razavi Khorasan province]; died in 1020 ACE in the same place)." | | | |
| Dysdera kourosh Bellvert, Zamani & Dimitrov, 2024 | Spider | Cyrus the Great | A woodlouse hunting spider from Iran, named "after Cyrus the Great – Kourosh in Persian, which translates as Lord of the Sun – the founder of the first Persian empire." | | | |
| Egilona O. Pickard-Cambridge, 1895 | Spider | Egilona | Subsequently synonymised with Ceratinopsis. | | | |
| Elasmopus yupanquii Alves, Johnsson & Senna, 2016 | Crustacean | Cápac Yupanqui | "The species name refers to the emperor Cápac Yupanqui, who was the forerunner king of the first people of the Inca civilization." | | | |
| Elasmopus incarocai Alves, Johnsson & Senna, 2016 | Crustacean | Inca Roca | "The species name refers to the emperor Inca Roca, the first king of Inca civilization." | | | |
| Elasmopus yahuarhuaci Alves, Johnsson & Senna, 2016 | Crustacean | Yawar Waqaq | "The species name refers to the Yahuar Huac [sic]—the third [sic, actually second] Inca King, whose name means tears of blood. This name alludes to the red color of the living species." | | | |
| Elasmopus viracochai Alves, Johnsson & Senna, 2016 | Crustacean | Viracocha Inca | "The species name refers to the emperor Viracocha, who was the fourth [sic, actually third] King of the Inca civilization." | | | |
| Elasmopus pachacuteci Alves, Johnsson & Senna, 2016 | Crustacean | Pachacuti | "The species name refers to the Pachacútec, the fifth [sic, actually fourth] King of Inca civilization, who was the most powerful emperor of them" | | | |
| Electrophorus voltai de Santana et al., 2019 | Electric eel | Alessandro Volta | Capable of discharges of up to 860 V, this species is the strongest bioelectricity generator known to science. | | | |
| Elephantis Castelin, Marquet & Klotz, 2013 | Crustacean | Elephantis | "Elephantis is a humorous name after an ancient Greek erotical poetess in reference to the enlarged sexual appendages of males." | | | |
| Elephas columbi † Falconer, 1857 | Mammoth | Christopher Columbus | The Columbian mammoth inhabited the southern half of North America, ranging from the northern United States across Mexico as far south as Costa Rica, during the Pleistocene epoch. Subsequently transferred to genus Mammuthus. | | | |
| Eleutherodactylus amadeus Hedges et al., 1987 | Frog | Wolfgang Amadeus Mozart | Named after Mozart "for the remarkable resemblance of the wide-band audiospectrogram of this species to musical notes". | | | |
| Eleutherodactylus simonbolivari Wiens & Coloma, 1992 | Frog | Simón Bolívar | Subsequently transferred to genus Pristimantis. | | | |
| Enallax napoleoni † Girard | Green alga | Napoleon | A fossil species found in Cretaceous amber from Île-d'Aix, off the west coast of France, and named "In reference to the history of Aix Island. The emperor Napoléon I, after he was defeated in Waterloo, stayed for a time on Aix Island before [going on] to be exiled and to die on Sainte Hélène Island." | | | |
| Encyocrypta abelardi Raven, 1994 | Spider | Peter Abelard | A brushed trapdoor spider endemic to New Caledonia; the holotype was collected from the same locality as Encyocrypta heloiseae. | | | |
| Encyocrypta heloiseae Raven, 1994 | Spider | Héloïse | A brushed trapdoor spider endemic to New Caledonia; the holotype was collected from the same locality as Encyocrypta abelardi. | | | |
| Entedonomyia platoni Girault, 1915 | Wasp | Plato | Subsequently synonymised with Pediobius agaristae. | | | |
| Enrico O. Pickard-Cambridge, 1895 | Spider | Euric | Subsequently synonymised with Eucteniza. The only described species, Enrico mexicanus, was renamed Eucteniza atoyacensis (to avoid homonymy with Eucteniza mexicana), and considered a nomen dubium: since it was originally described based on a juvenile specimen, it is unclear whether it represents a distinct species. | | | |
| Entedonomphale boccaccioi Triapitsyn, 2005 | Wasp | Giovanni Boccaccio | | | | |
| Epiblatticida lambi Girault, 1915 | Wasp | Charles Lamb | | | | |
| Epipeltephilus kanti † González-Ruiz, Scillato-Yané, Krmpotic & Carlini, 2012 | Armadillo | Immanuel Kant | A fossil species from the Miocene of Argentina, named "in honor of the Prussian philosopher Emmanuel Kant (1724–1804), brilliant creator of the criticism and precursor of the modern scientific philosophy." | | | |
| Epiperilampus channingi Girault, 1913 | Wasp | William Ellery Channing | "Respectfully dedicated to the William Ellery Channing in recognition of his public utterances against war." Genus Epiperilampus was subsequently synonymised with Trichilogaster. | | | |
| Epirhyssa shaka Rousse & Van Noort, 2014 | Wasp | Shaka | | | | |
| Epistenia goethei Girault, 1913 | Wasp | Johann Wolfgang von Goethe | | | | |
| Eponides huaynai † Frizzell, 1943 | Protist | Huayna Capac | A fossil foraminiferan from the Cretaceous of Peru. | | | |
| Eponides zaratei † Frizzell, 1943 | Protist | Agustín de Zárate | A fossil foraminiferan from the Cretaceous of Peru. | | | |
| Ercilla A.Juss. | Flowering plant | Alonso de Ercilla | A genus native to Chile, "named after the author of a famous epic set in Chile" (La Araucana). | | | |
| Ervig O. Pickard-Cambridge, 1895 | Spider | Erwig | Subsequently synonymised with Diguetia. | | | |
| Erythraeus hafezi Saboori, Hakimitabar & Mahmoudi, 2014 | Mite | Hafez | Described from specimens collected in Shiraz, Iran, and "named in memory of Muhammad Hafez-e Shirazi (a Persian lyric poet). His collected works are composed of a series of Persian poetry (Divan). His life and poems have been the subject of much analysis, commentary and interpretation, influencing post-Fourteenth Century Persian writing more than any other author. Hafez was born in Shiraz city, Iran and his mausoleum, Hafezieh, is located in the Musalla Gardens of Shiraz city" | | | |
| Erythrodiplax cleopatra Ris, 1911 | Dragonfly | Cleopatra VII | | | | |
| Escallonia atahuallpae J.F.Macbr. | Flowering plant | Atahualpa | This species is native to Peru. "Whether King Atahuallpa murdered his brother or merely defended himself, his famous name may appropriately be perpetuated in the botany of the land of the Incas. Anyway, it may be mentioned, for the pleasure of the cynics, that it would not be the first time that a plant has been named for a reprobate." Subsequently synonymised with Escallonia pendula. | | | |
| Etheostoma tecumsehi Ceas & Page, 1997 | Fish | Tecumseh | This species is native to Pond River in Kentucky, in an area inhabited by the Shawnee in the past. Its common name is "Shawnee darter". | | | |
| Eucharomorpha worcesteri Girault, 1913 | Wasp | Noah Worcester | "This beautiful species, the first to be recorded from the American continent, is respectfully dedicated to Noah Worcester for his A Solemn Review of the Custom of War."; Subsequently transferred to genus Orasema. | | | |
| Euderomyia carlylei Girault, 1913 | Wasp | Thomas Carlyle | Genus Euderomyia was subsequently synonymised with Omphale. | | | |
| Eulophus agathyllus Walker, 1846 | Wasp | Agathyllus | | | | |
| Eupatorium L. | Flowering plant | Mithridates VI Eupator | Named in honor of Mithridates VI Eupator, 132-63 B.C., ancient king of Pontus, who reportedly discovered the medicinal uses for some Eupatorium species plants. | | | |
| Eupelmus fieldingi Girault, 1915 | Wasp | Henry Fielding | | | | |
| Eupelmus grotii Girault, 1915 | Wasp | Hugo Grotius | Subsequently synonymised with Eupelmus antipoda. | | | |
| Eupelmus lambi Girault, 1915 | Wasp | Charles Lamb | Subsequently transferred to genus Brasema. | | | |
| Eupelmus montaignei Girault, 1915 | Wasp | Michel de Montaigne | | | | |
| Euphorbia regis-jubae Webb & Berthel. | Flowering plant | Juba II | | | | |
| Eurycea junaluska Sever et al., 1976 | Salamander | Junaluska | | | | |
| Eusphalerum kanti † Shavrin & Yamamoto, 2019 | Beetle | Immanuel Kant | A fossil species found in Eocene Baltic Amber, "named in honour of the great German philosopher Immanuel Kant (1724–1804), the author of the doctrine of transcendental idealism." Kant was born in Königsberg, on the Baltic coast. | | | |
| Eutropis lapulapu Barley et al., 2020 | Lizard | Lapulapu | "We are pleased to name this species in honor of the Philippine National Hero, Lapu-Lapu, who is considered to be the first Filipino native to have resisted Spanish colonization. Lapu-Lapu was a ruler on the island of Mactan in the Visayas, where this species is known to occur." | | | |
| Exetastes cornaroae Kittel, 2016 | Wasp | Elena Cornaro Piscopia | Replacement name for Exetastes rufiventris Meyer, 1929, which had become a junior homonym when Banchus rufiventris Brullé, 1846 was transferred to the genus Exetastes in 1966, becoming Exetastes rufiventris (Brullé, 1846). | | | |
| Exetastes crousae Kittel, 2016 | Wasp | Marie Crous | Replacement name for Exetastes longipes Uchida, 1928, which had become a junior homonym when Campoplex longipes Smith, 1878 was transferred to the genus Exetastes in 1961, becoming Exetastes longipes (Smith, 1878). | | | |
| Fagara avicennae Lam. | Flowering plant | Avicenna | Subsequently transferred to genus Zanthoxylum. | | | |
| Falcidius hannibal Gnezdilov & Wilson, 2008 | Planthopper | Hannibal | This species is native to Tunisia and Algeria, where Ancient Carthage used to be. | | | |
| Falcidius scipionis Gnezdilov & Wilson, 2008 | Planthopper | Scipio Aemilianus | This species is native to Algeria and its epithet "is derived from the name of Roman general Scipio in the third Punic war." | | | |
| Falco eleonorae Gené, 1839 | Bird of prey | Eleanor of Arborea | A species of falcon described from specimens captured in Sardinia and named after Eleanor of Arborea, Queen or Lady-Judge (Juighissa) and national heroine of Sardinia, who in 1392, under the jurisdiction conferred by the Carta de Logu, became the first ruler in history to grant protection to hawk and falcon nests against illegal hunters. | | | |
| Favila O. Pickard-Cambridge, 1895 | Spider | Favila of Asturias | Subsequently synonymised with Eucteniza. | | | |
| Finlayia Girault 1934 | Wasp | George Finlay | Subsequently synonymised with Merostenus. | | | |
| Flintiella quiteriae Cavalcante-Silva, Santos & Calor, 2025 | Caddisfly | Maria Quitéria | A microcaddisfly species native to Bahia, Brazil, "named in honor of Maria Quitéria de Jesus, the first woman to join the Brazilian Army (1822–1823), for her important contribution to the independence of Brazil." María Quitéria was from Bahia. | | | |
| Floracarus atillai Ripka, 2009 | Mite | Attila | A shrub-infesting mite found in Hungary, "named in honour of Atilla [sic] (?–453), King of [the] Hun Empire (reigned: 434–453)." | | | |
| Fontainechelon † Pérez-García, Ortega & Jiménez Fuentes, 2016 | Turtle | Jean de La Fontaine | A fossil genus of tortoises from the Eocene of France, named "in honor of the French fabulist Jean de La Fontaine (1621–1695), who wrote several fables in which the protagonist was a tortoise; and -chelon, from the ancient Greek word χελώνη (cheloni), which means turtle or tortoise." | | | |
| Franklinia W.Bartram ex Marshall | Flowering plant | Benjamin Franklin | | | | |
| Gallus lafayettii Lesson, 1831 | Fowl | Gilbert du Motier, Marquis de Lafayette | | | | |
| Gazella bilkis † Groves & Lay, 1985 | Gazelle | Queen of Sheba | "Bilkis or Bilqis is the name given to the Queen of Sheba in Arabic writings. [...] The kingdom of Sheba corresponded approximately with the modern Republic of North Yemen [the type locality] [...]. The name thus commemorates both the legendary beauty of the Queen of Sheba and the geographic location of her realm." | | | |
| Gentiana L. | Flowering plant | Gentius | | | | |
| Geotrypus copernici † Skoczeń, 1980 | Mole | Nicolaus Copernicus | A fossil species from the Pliocene and Pleistocene of Poland, "Named [in] commemoration of the 500th anniversary of the birth of Mikołaj Kopernik, the great Polish astronomer." Subsequently transferred to genus Skoczenia. | | | |
| Givira cleopatra Barnes & McDunnough, 1912 | Moth | Cleopatra VII | | | | |
| Gnathia beethoveni Paul & Menzies, 1971 | Crustacean | Ludwig van Beethoven | | | | |
| Gobiesox juniperoserrai Espinosa Pérez & Castro-Aguirre, 1996 | Fish | Junípero Serra | A freshwater clingfish from Baja California, named "for Fray Junipero Serra, Jesuit missionary, evangelizer, and explorer of the Alta and Baja California region during the Colonial epoch." | | | |
| Godiva Macnae, 1954 | Sea slug | Lady Godiva | | | | |
| Goetheana Girault, 1920 | Wasp | Johann Wolfgang von Goethe | | | | |
| Goetheana pushkini Triapitsyn, 2005 | Wasp | Alexander Pushkin | | | | |
| Goetheana rabelaisi Triapitsyn, 2005 | Wasp | François Rabelais | "Continuing A.A. Girault's trend to name some taxa after the great poets and writers of the past (particularly in this genus), I am naming this new species after François Rabelais." | | | |
| Goetheana shakespearei Girault, 1920 | Wasp | William Shakespeare | | | | |
| Goethella Girault, 1928 | Wasp | Johann Wolfgang von Goethe | | | | |
| Goloboffia biberi Ferretti, Ríos-Tamayo & Goloboff, 2019 | Spider | Heinrich Ignaz Franz Biber | "in honor of the Bohemian-Austrian composer and violinist Heinrich Ignaz Franz von Biber (1644–1704), one of the most important composers for the violin in the history of the instrument." | | | |
| Goloboffia pachelbeli Ferretti, Ríos-Tamayo & Goloboff, 2019 | Spider | Johann Pachelbel | "in honor of Johannes [sic] Pachelbel (1653–1706), a German composer and organist, and one of the most important composers of the middle Baroque era." | | | |
| Gomphotherium hannibali † Welcomme, 1994 | Proboscidean | Hannibal | A fossil species, related to elephants, from the Miocene of Languedoc, France; named "in honour of the Carthaginian general Hannibal who, on his journey through Languedoc to conquer Rome in 218 BC, passed with his elephants near the site [where the remains were found]." | | | |
| Gonatocerus baconi Girault, 1912 | Wasp | Roger Bacon | "Dedicated to the Roman Catholic friar, Roger Bacon, who, in an early superstitious and ignorant century, long since laid down the basis for science and reason. He was centuries ahead of his time." Subsequently transferred to the genus Lymaenon. | | | |
| Gonatocerus brunoi Girault, 1912 | Wasp | Giordano Bruno | "Dedicated to the monistic philosopher Giordano Bruno, who in the middle ages was a father of monism and a sound thinker at a time when most were under the combined influence of superstition and dogmatic religion." Subsequently transferred to the genus Lymaenon. | | | |
| Gonatocerus carlylei Girault, 1913 | Wasp | Thomas Carlyle | Subsequently transferred to the genus Lymaenon. | | | |
| Gonatocerus comptei Girault, 1912 | Wasp | Auguste Comte | "Dedicated to Auguste Comte, the positive philosopher, whose philosophic principles, although not always right, were based upon positivism, materialism, realism or experience combined with reason." | | | |
| Gonatocerus davinci Girault, 1912 | Wasp | Leonardo da Vinci | "Dedicated to Leonardo Da Vinci, the manly Italian, one of the earliest of scientists." Subsequently transferred to the genus Lymaenon. | | | |
| Gonatocerus goethei Girault, 1912 | Wasp | Johann Wolfgang von Goethe | "Dedicated to Johann Wolfgang Goethe, poet, naturalist and monistic philosopher." Subsequently transferred to the genus Lymaenon. | | | |
| Gonatocerus huyghensi Girault, 1912 | Wasp | Christiaan Huyghens | "Dedicated to Huyghens who discovered the vibratory principle of light." Subsequently transferred to the genus Lymaenon. | | | |
| Gonatocerus lomonosoffi Girault, 1913 | Wasp | Mikhail Lomonosov | Subsequently transferred to the genus Lymaenon. | | | |
| Gonatocerus saintpierrei Girault, 1913 | Wasp | Charles-Irénée Castel de Saint-Pierre | "Respectfully dedicated to the Abbe Saint-Pierre for his work entitled The Project of Perpetual Peace."; Subsequently transferred to genus Lymaenon. | | | |
| Gonatocerus shakespearei Girault, 1915 | Wasp | William Shakespeare | Subsequently transferred to genus Lymaenon. | | | |
| Gonatocerus spinozai Girault, 1912 | Wasp | Baruch Spinoza | "Dedicated to the profound student and thinker, Baruch Spinoza, who in the seventeenth century introduced the monistic conception of matter, "the loftiest, profoundest, and truest thought of all ages"." Subsequently transferred to the genus Lymaenon. | | | |
| Goniacodon hiawathae † Van Valen, 1978 | Mesonychian (an extinct order of mammals) | Hiawatha | | | | |
| Goyacrinus † Cole et al., 2017 | Sea lily | Francisco de Goya | A fossil genus of crinoids from the Ordovician of Zaragoza, Spain, named "in recognition of the Spanish painter, Francisco José de Goya y Lucientes, who was born in Fuendetodos (Zaragoza province), several kilometers north of the locality were this crinoid was collected." | | | |
| Graphium (Pazala) confucius Hu, Duan & Cotton, 2018 | Butterfly | Confucius | This species is native to China and "dedicated to Confucius (Chinese name Qiu Kong, courtesy name Zhongni; 551–479 BC), a Chinese teacher, editor, politician, and philosopher of the Spring and Autumn Period of Chinese history." | | | |
| Grotiusella Girault, 1913 | Wasp | Hugo Grotius | Subsequently synonymised with the genus Eulophinusia Girault, 1913. | | | |
| Grotiusomyia Girault, 1917 | Wasp | Hugo Grotius | | | | |
| Guarocuyus Landestov, Schools, & Hedges, 2022 | Lizard | Enriquillo | A monotypic genus of galliwasp lizard from the Dominican Republic, named after Guarocuya, the likely indigenous name of Enriquillo, a Taíno cacique who rebelled against the Spaniards. | | | |
| Guemesia † Agnolín et al., 2022 | Dinosaur | Martín Miguel de Güemes | An abelisaurid dinosaur from the Cretaceous of Argentina "honoring General Martin Miguel de Güemes, who was both Governor and a military leader who defended northwestern Argentina during the War of Independence. The year 2021 has been declared as "the bicentennial of the death of General Güemes" by the Senate of the Argentine Nation." | | | |
| Gustavia L. | Flowering plant | Gustav III of Sweden | Dedicated by Linnaeus to honour his king. | | | |
| Gutenbergia Sch.Bip. | Flowering plant | Johannes Gutenberg | | | | |
| Gynacantha rammohani Mitra & Lahiri, 1975 | Dragonfly | Raja Ram Mohan Roy | This species, native to West Bengal, India, was "named in honour of Raja Ram Mohan Roy (1772-1833) for his sincere advocacy (1831) in the formation of Supra National Organisation for settling all disputes among nations and for furthering the cause of peace in the world." | | | |
| Gyrolasella channingi Girault, 1913 | Wasp | William Ellery Channing | "Respectfully dedicated to William E. Channing for his Discourses on War."; Subsequently transferred to the name Cirrospilus channingianus. | | | |
| Halimuraena shakai Winterbottom, 1978 | Fish | Shaka | "Named for the Zulu king, Shaka, who raised his people from a small tribe to a powerful nation. The hastate body of the new species is a perhaps fanciful reminder of the short stabbing spear or "iklwa" which Shaka developed and used with such devastating effect." This species was found in Sodwana Bay, KwaZulu-Natal, South Africa. | | | |
| Hallucinochrysa diogenesi † Pérez-de la Fuente, Delclòs, Peñalver & Engel, 2012 | Lacewing | Diogenes | A fossil species found in Cretaceous amber from northern Spain. Only the larva is known, which, like the larvae of many extant lacewings, camouflaged itself by covering its body with debris, but in this case its exceptionally long bristles formed a basket which enabled it to carry a very large "trash packet". "The species name is a patronym for the Greek philosopher Diogenes of Sinope, whose name has been applied to a human behavioral disorder characterized by compulsive hoarding of trash." | | | |
| Halobacterium bonnevillei Myers & King, 2020 | Archaeon | Benjamin Bonneville | A halophile archaeon isolated from Bonneville Salt Flats (Utah, US) salt crusts and nearby saline soils, whose name "honours Major Benjamin Bonneville, for whom Bonneville Salt Flats is named." | | | |
| Hannibalia Girault, 1928 | Thrip | Hannibal | Subsequently synonymised with Dactylothrips. | | | |
| Hanyusuchus † Iijima et al., 2022 | Crocodile | Han Yu | An extinct genus of gavialid crocodilian from the Holocene of South China, whose extinction may have been human-induced, according to researchers. In his 819 work "Text for the Crocodiles" (祭鱷魚文), Han Yu issued a proclamation in which he instructed the crocodiles to leave the area of Chaozhou or be killed, after a rash of crocodile attacks on humans and livestock. | | | |
| Haplophragmoides atahuallpai † Frizzell, 1943 | Protist | Atahualpa | A fossil foraminiferan from the Cretaceous of Peru, whose name is "derived from that of the ruling Inca at the time of the conquest of Peru." | | | |
| Haplophragmoides zaratei † Frizzell, 1943 | Protist | Agustín de Zárate | A fossil foraminiferan from the Cretaceous of Peru. | | | |
| Harpactea asparuhi Lazarov, 2008 | Spider | Asparuh of Bulgaria | This species is native to Bulgaria. | | | |
| Harpagus Vigors, 1824 | Bird of prey | Harpagus | | | | |
| Harriotta raleighana Goode & T. H. Bean, 1895 | Chimaera | Sir Walter Raleigh | "This species is named in honor of Sir Walter Raleigh, philosopher and explorer, by whom the first English scientific expedition was sent to the New World." | | | |
| Hedyosmum huascari J.F.Macbr. | Flowering plant | Huáscar | This species is native to Peru. "Its name conmemorates Huascar, son of the Inca king Huyana [sic]. He died in battle over the kingdom inherited jointly with his brother Atahuallpa." | | | |
| Helenicula naresuani Stekolnikov, 2016 | Mite | Naresuan | A species of chigger found on common treeshrews and greater bandicoot rats in Thailand, "named after Naresuan, the king of Ayutthaya Kingdom (at the territory of modern Thailand) in 1590–1605, one of the most glorious Thai kings." | | | |
| Heliophanus xerxesi Logunov, 2019 | Spider | Xerxes I | This species, native to Iran, is "named after Xerxes I (reigned 485–465 BC) of the Achaemenid dynasty, the King of Persia, who marched against Greece but was defeated at Salamis." | | | |
| Heliotropium khayyamii Akhani | Flowering plant | Omar Khayyam | A heliotrope from Khorasan, Iran, whose name "honours a Persian astronomer, mathematician and poet of [the] 12th Century, Hakim Omar Khayyam from Neyshabur." The holotype was collected near Neyshabur. | | | |
| Hellinsia benalcazari Gielis, 2011 | Moth | Sebastián de Belalcázar | This species is native to Ecuador and "named after Sebastian de Benalcazar, lieutenant of Francisco Pizarro, the conquistador of South America." | | | |
| Hellinsia espejoi Gielis, 2014 | Moth | Eugenio Espejo | This species is native to Ecuador and "named after and in honor of Eugenia [sic] Espejo, son of an indian father and mulatto mother, born in 1747. He was a brilliant scholar and poet, writing against colonialism. He died in prison in 1795." | | | |
| Hellinsia huayna Gielis, 2011 | Moth | Huayna Capac | This species is native to Ecuador. | | | |
| Hellinsia montufari Gielis, 2011 | Moth | Carlos de Montúfar | This species is native to Ecuador and "named after Montufar, an Ecuadorian freedom fighter, opposing the Spanish." | | | |
| Hellinsia orellanai Gielis, 2011 | Moth | Francisco de Orellana | This species is native to Ecuador and "named after Francesco de Orellana, conquistador and lieutenant of Gonzalo Pizarro." | | | |
| Hellinsia paccha Gielis, 2011 | Moth | Paccha Duchicela | This species is native to Ecuador. | | | |
| Hellinsia pizarroi Gielis, 2011 | Moth | Francisco Pizarro | This species is native to Ecuador and "named after the Spanish conquistador Francisco Pizarro, the first European to set foot in many parts of South America." | | | |
| Hellinsia ruminahuii Gielis, 2011 | Moth | Rumiñahui | This species is native to Ecuador. | | | |
| Hellinsia sucrei Gielis, 2011 | Moth | Antonio José de Sucre | This species is native to Ecuador and "named after Antonio José de Sucre, who was crucial in achieving the freedom of several South American countries." | | | |
| Hellinsia tupaci Gielis, 2011 | Moth | Topa Inca Yupanqui | This species is native to Ecuador. | | | |
| Hemicyclopora pytheasi Harmelin & Rosso, 2023 | Bryozoan | Pytheas | A species from the Northern Atlantic coast of France, named "In honour of Pytheas, famous antique astronomer and sailor, citizen of Massalia (ancient Greek name of Marseille), who explored the northern seas during the 4th century B.C., and in reference to the geographical distribution of this species." | | | |
| Hemidactylus nzingae Ceríaco, Agarwal, Marques & Bauer, 2020 | Lizard | Nzinga of Ndongo and Matamba | "The species is named after Ngola Nzinga Mbande (1583–1663), also known by the Portuguese Catholic name of Ana de Sousa, queen of the kingdoms of Ndongo and Matamba and one of the most important Angolan chieftains, whose kingdoms spanned approximately the same region as the known distribution of the new species. We propose the Portuguese common name of "Osga da Rainha Nzinga", and the English common name of "Queen Nzinga's Tropical Gecko" for this species." | | | |
| Hemitoma (Montfortia) davincii † Pacaud, 2004 | Limpet | Leonardo da Vinci | A fossil species from the Paleocene of France "Dedicated to the great Leonardo da Vinci (1452-1519), explorer of the Arts and Sciences and exceptional observer who wrote: "With time, the sea withdrew, the mud was converted into stone and the shells, now deprived of their animals, were filled with mud and thus in the course of the transformation into stone." | | | |
| Hernandaria zumbii DaSilva & Pinto-da-Rocha, 2010 | Harvestman | Zumbi dos Palmares | "In honor of Zumbi dos Palmares (1655-1695), leader of the Quilombo dos Palmares, town where black slaves lived after escaping from Portuguese landlords in northeast Brazil. He is a symbol of black resistance in Brazil."; This species is native to Brazil. | | | |
| Herodotia Girault 1931 | Wasp | Herodotus | | | | |
| Hesperia hobomok Harris, 1862 | Butterfly | Hobomok | Subsequently transferred to genus Lon. | | | |
| Heterakis atahualpai Freitas & Ibáñez, 1961 | Roundworm | Atahualpa | A parasite of the Andean tinamou, found in Peru, named "in homage to the memory of Atahualpa, the last Inca, killed in 1533 by order of Pizarro." | | | |
| Heterospilus washingtoni Marsh, 2013 | Wasp | George Washington | | | | |
| Heterospilus xerxes Marsh, 2013 | Wasp | Xerxes I | | | | |
| Hippocratea L. | Flowering plant | Hippocrates | | | | |
| Hippolyte sapphica d'Udekem d'Acoz, 1993 | Crustacean | Sappho | A species of shrimp native to the waters of Lesbos island. | | | |
| Hisonotus vespuccii Roxo, Silva & Oliveira, 2015 | Catfish | Amerigo Vespucci | This species is native to the São Francisco River basin in Brazil and was named "in reference to Américo Vespúcio (Amerigo Vespucci in Italian), navigator and explorer to whom is attributed the discovery of the rio São Francisco in 1501." | | | |
| Homalonotus herschelii † Murchison, 1839 | Trilobite | John Herschel | A trilobite from the upper Silurian and lower Devonian of South Africa; Murchison said "I have selected it because it marks the fact that the eminent astronomer, after whom it is named, occupied a portion of the time he passed in Southern Africa in promoting geological investigation. The fossil was first sent to me by him." Subsequently transferred to genus Burmeisteria. | | | |
| Homeryon Galil, 2000 | Crustacean | Homer | | | | |
| Hoplitaspis hiawathai † Lamsdell et al., 2019 | Early Arthropod | Hiawatha | A fossil chasmataspidid from the Ordovician Big Hill Formation in Michigan, US, "Named after Hiawatha, Native American leader and co-founder of the Iroquois Confederacy, whose name is given to the Hiawatha National Forest located nearby to the Stonington Peninsula locality." | | | |
| Hycleus marcipoli Pan & Bologna, 2014 | Beetle | Marco Polo | "As a tribute to the collaboration established among the authors during the Ph.D. studies made in Italy by one of them (PZ), the new species is named after Marco Polo (1254–1324), the Venetian explorer who, during a long period of permanence in China in the late XIII century (1271–1284), established the first well documented relationships between the Chinese and European worlds and opened western culture to the wide and rich Chinese heritage." | | | |
| Hydraena grueberi Skale & Jäch, 2009 | Beetle | Johann Grueber | "Named for the Austrian Jesuit priest Johannes [sic] Grueber (1623–1680), who was the first European to visit and report about Tibet's capital Lhasa and its mystical Potala Palace. On his way back he traversed the Himalaya and visited Kathmandu Valley. Grueber probably was the first Austrian in Nepal."; This species is native to Nepal, and its discoverers are Austrian. | | | |
| Hylomyrma dandarae Ulysséa, 2021 | Ant | Dandara dos Palmares | "named in honor of Dandara (?–1694), a leader and warrior in the resistance against slavery during the Brazilian colonial period. She was part of the "Quilombo dos Palmares", the largest settlement of African and Afro-Brazilian peoples who escaped enslavement." | | | |
| Hypolestes hatuey Torres-Cambas, 2015 | Damselfly | Hatuey | A species from Hispaniola, "named in honour of Hatuey, a Taíno Cacique from Quisqueya, the present Hispaniola, who travelled to Cuba in the sixteen century to fight against Spanish conquerors. Hatuey was captured and burned alive in Cuba, where he is considered a hero." | | | |
| Ibyka † J.E. Skog & H.P. Banks | Plant | Ibycus | | | | |
| Ichneumon cunitzae Kittel, 2016 | Wasp | Maria Cunitz | Replacement name for Ichneumon impressus Gmelin, 1790: 2704, which was preoccupied by Ichneumon impressus Gmelin, 1790: 2698. | | | |
| Ichneumon vandenbrandeae Kittel, 2016 | Wasp | Jacoba van den Brande | Replacement name for Ichneumon lateralis Kriechbaumer, 1887, which was preoccupied by Ichneumon lateralis Cuvier, 1833. | | | |
| Idarnoides channingi Girault, 1913 | Wasp | William Ellery Channing | "Respectfully dedicated to William Ellery Channing, for his efforts directed against war." Genus Idarnoides was subsequently synonymised with Apocrypta. | | | |
| Impatiens aadishankarii Bhaskar & Sringesh | Flowering plant | Adi Shankara | A balsamine native to Karnataka, India, named after the sage Adi Shankara, who is believed to have meditated upon the Kodachadri peak (the type locality). | | | |
| Insulacebus toussaintiana † Cookie et al., 2011 | Monkey | Toussaint Louverture | "The species name, toussaintiana, is in honor of Toussaint Louverture (1743–1803), a Haitian hero and a founding father of the nation." | | | |
| Iris ferdowsii Joharchi & Memariani | Flowering plant | Ferdowsi | The specific epithet "ferdowsii" honours the great Persian poet "Hakim Abolghasem Ferdowsi Tousi" (940−1020 AD) whose tomb is located in Tous town, near Mashhad, the capital city of Razavi Khorasan province, Iran [which contains the distribution range of this species]. The type locality of the new species is situated 25 km NE of Pazh (Paj) village, [his birthplace]." | | | |
| Isotogastrura ahuizotli Palacios-Vargas & Thibaud, 1998 | Springtail | Ahuitzotl | This species is native to Baja California, Mexico. | | | |
| Jawharia † Seiffert et al., 2007 | Afrosoricidan mammal | Jawhar al-Siqilli | A fossil genus from the Oligocene of Northern Egypt. | | | |
| Jeffersonia Barton | Flowering plant | Thomas Jefferson | | | | |
| Jenghizkhan † Olshevsky, 1995 | Dinosaur | Genghis Khan | A genus assigned to a fossil from the Cretaceous of Mongolia, which had previously been classified as a Tyrannosaurus; "Latinized version of the name of the Mongol tyrant Genghis Khan, who ruled an empire extending from Europe to China during the late 12th and early 13th centuries A.D., in reference to the presumed ecological role of this dinosaur as the top predator of its domain." Subsequently synonymised with Tarbosaurus. | | | |
| Joannesia Vell. | Flowering plant | John VI of Portugal | A genus in the spurge family, endemic to Brazil and described when John was Prince of Brazil. | | | |
| Jubaea Kunth | Palm | Juba II | | | | |
| Kalidasa Kirkaldy, 1900 | Planthopper | Kalidasa | | | | |
| Keatsia Girault 1928 | Wasp | John Keats | Subsequently synonymised with Metaphaenodiscus. | | | |
| Kepplerites (Toricellites) besseli † Mönnig & Dietl, 2022 | Ammonite | Friedrich Bessel | | | | |
| Kepplerites (Gowericeras) copernici † Mönnig & Dietl, 2022 | Ammonite | Nicolaus Copernicus | | | | |
| Kepplerites (Gowericeras) halleyi † Mönnig & Dietl, 2022 | Ammonite | Edmond Halley | | | | |
| Kepplerites (Tychoites) herscheli † Mönnig & Dietl, 2017 | Ammonite | William Herschel | | | | |
| Kepplerites tychonis † Ravn, 1911 | Ammonite | Tycho Brahe | Subsequently designated as type species of subgenus Tychoites, also in this list. | | | |
| Khanitermes † Engel, Grimaldi & Krishna, 2007 | Termite | Genghis Khan | A fossil genus from the Cretaceous of Mongolia. "The new genus-group name is a combination of Khan, the title of political and military leaders in the ancient Mongol Empire, and Termes (meaning "termite"), the first generic name of the Isoptera. The generic name is a reference to the most famous Khan of ancient Mongolia, Genghis Khan (c. 1162 – 18 August 1227, born Borjigin Temüjin, the former being his surname, was bestowed with the title Khan and became Genghis Khan in 1206). He united the Mongol Tribes into the Mongol Empire in 1206." | | | |
| Klasea yunus-emrei B. Dogan, Ocak & A. Duran | Flowering plant | Yunus Emre | A thistle from Anatolia, Turkey, "named in honour of Yunus Emre, who is one of the most revered philosophers in Turkish literature." | | | |
| Kwazulusaurus shakai † Maisch, 2002 | Dicynodont | Shaka | "After King Shaka Zulu (c. 1787-1828), leader of the Zulu nation." A fossil lystrosaurid from the Late Permian of South Africa. The only known specimen was found in KwaZulu-Natal. | | | |
| Lacon zenobiae Kundrata, Mertlik & Németh, 2019 | Beetle | Zenobia | A click beetle described from specimens collected near Palmyra, Syria. | | | |
| Laelaspis dariusi Joharchi & Jalaeian, 2012 | Mite | Darius the Great | A species from Iran "named in memory of Darius I [...], also known as Darius the Great, [...] the third king of the Achaemenid Empire, who proved to be a strong and wise ruler and he was tolerant toward other religions and cultures, promoted learning, agriculture, forestation, and the construction of highways. He also built the great palace cities of Susa and Persepolis." | | | |
| Lamennaisia Girault, 1922 | Wasp | Hugues Felicité Robert de Lamennais | | | | |
| Laotrombicula fangumi Stekolnikov, 2014 | Mite | Fa Ngum | A species of chigger that affects the Laotian rock rat, a living fossil discovered in 2005 in central Laos. "The species is named after Fa Ngum, who founded in 1354 the kingdom of Lan Xang Hôm Khao ("land of one million elephants and a white parasol"), the earliest kingdom on the territory of Laos." | | | |
| Lapageria Ruiz & Pav. | Flowering plant | Empress Joséphine | Named after Joséphine's maiden name, Marie Josèphe Rose Tascher de La Pagerie "in compliment to her for her many services to botany; she greatly encouraged the cultivation of exotic plants by growing them herself in her garden at Malmaison, near Paris." | | | |
| Latigammaropsis akhenateni Myers, 2014 | Crustacean | Akhenaten | | | | |
| Lautaria Porto, Derkarabetian, Giribet & Pérez-González, 2024 | Harvestman | Lautaro | This genus is native to Chile and its name "honors Lautaro (Leftraru), a renowned toqui (Mapuche military leader) who played a significant role in the Arauco War during the early stages of the Spanish conquest of what is now Chile." | | | |
| Legionella shakespearei Verma et al. 1992 | Bacterium | William Shakespeare | Isolated from water from a cooling tower in Stratford-upon-Avon, birthplace of Shakespeare. | | | |
| Leichhardteus yagan Raven, 2015 | Spider | Yagan | A corinnid sac spider native to Western Australia. | | | |
| Leimacis lomonosoffi Girault, 1912 | Wasp | Mikhail Lomonosov | "Respectfully dedicated to the Russian peasant, Michael Wassiliewitsch Lomonosoff, afterward physical chemist, professor and man of affairs, one of the fathers of modern chemistry and profound research scholar." Genus Leimacis was subsequently synonymised with Arescon. | | | |
| Leonardo Błeszyński, 1965 | Moth | Leonardo da Vinci | | | | |
| Leonardo avicennae Bassi, 1990 | Moth | Avicenna | | | | |
| Leonardo davincii Błeszyński, 1965 | Moth | Leonardo da Vinci | | | | |
| Leonardoscia Campos-Filho, Araujo & Taiti, 2014 | Crustacean | Leonardo da Vinci | A monotypic genus for a troglobitic woodlouse, "named after Leonardo da Vinci, who also gives the name to the cave where the type species was collected." | | | |
| Leopoldinia Mart. | Palm | Maria Leopoldina of Austria | "We call this genus by the venerable name of the very august Princess Josepha Carolina Leopoldina, Archduchess of Austria, who held the glory, splendor, delight, and transatlantic throne of Brazil." This genus is found only in South American tropical rainforests. | | | |
| Lepidargyrus hafezi Linnavuori & Hosseini 1998 | True bug | Hafez | A plant bug native to Northern Iran. | | | |
| Lepinotus huoni Schmidt & New, 2008 | Barklouse | Jean-Michel Huon de Kermadec | This species is endemic to Tasmania, which Huon de Kermadec explored. | | | |
| Leptochelia billambi Błażewicz-Paszkowycz & Bamber, 2012 | Crustacean | William Lamb, 2nd Viscount Melbourne | A tanaid from Bass Strait, Australia, "Named after William Lamb, 2nd Viscount Melbourne, after whom the city of Melbourne was named in 1837."; Subsequently transferred to genus Chondrochelia. | | | |
| Leptotyphlops columbi Klauber, 1939 | Snake | Christopher Columbus | A threadsnake endemic to San Salvador Island, Bahamas, and named "after the island's most famous visitor." Subsequently transferred to genus Epictia. | | | |
| Leuciscus carolitertii Doadrio, 1987 | Fish | Charles III of Spain | The bordallo or Northern Iberian chub is a freshwater minnow endemic to the Iberian Peninsula, named "for Carlos III, the Spanish King who founded the Museo Nacional de Ciencias Naturales, Madrid, in 1771."; Subsequently transferred to genus Squalius. | | | |
| Linguamyrmex vladi † Barden & Grimaldi, 2017 | Ant | Vlad the Impaler | A fossil species found in Cretaceous Burmese amber, named "in reference to Vlad III, or Vlad Dracula (c. 1429–1476), prince of a region of Romania then called Wallachia. His moniker, Vlad the Impaler, refers to his favoured and frequent method of execution, which inspired the vampirous character Count Dracula fictionalized by Bram Stoker in 1897. The patronym is in reference to the presumed impalement of prey by Linguamyrmex and its liquid diet." | | | |
| Liphanthus molavi Mir Sharifi & Packer, 2019 | Bee | Rumi | "This species is named in honour of Molavi (Jalal ad-Din Muhammad Balkhi) spiritual master and poet often known in the west as Rumi." | | | |
| Liris cleopatra de Beaumont, 1961 | Wasp | Cleopatra VII | The holotype and allotype were collected in Egypt. | | | |
| Lomonosoffiella Girault, 1913 | Wasp | Mikhail Lomonosov | | | | |
| Loricaria cuffyi Londoño-Burbano, Urbano-Bonilla & Thomas, 2021 | Catfish | Cuffy | An armored catfish found in rivers of Guyana and Venezuela, named "In honor of the Afro-Guyanese slave Cuffy, or Coffy, who in 1763 led the revolt of more than 2,500 slaves in Berbice (former region of Guyana, now Co-operative Republic of Guyana) against the Dutch settler regime, which finally led to their freedom. Cuffy, accepted by all the rebels as the leader of the rebellion, declared himself Governor of Berbice. Today he is considered Guyana's first national hero." | | | |
| Lutheria Girault, 1919 | Wasp | Martin Luther | Replaced by nomen novum Lutherisca. | | | |
| Lysmata napoleoni De Grave & Anker, 2018 | Crustacean | Napoleon | A shrimp from the South Atlantic Ocean, "named after Napoléon Bonaparte (1769–1821), arguably St. Helena's [the type locality] most famous resident, from his exile to the island in 1815 to his death there in 1821." | | | |
| Lyssomanes belgranoi Galiano, 1984 | Spider | Manuel Belgrano | The type locality is in General Manuel Belgrano Department, Argentina. "The specific name is a patronym in honour of General Manuel Belgrano, creator of the Argentine flag." | | | |
| Macrogomphus phalantus jayavarman Kosterin, 2019 | Dragonfly | Jayavarman II | "after Jayavarman II, the founder of the famous Angkor Empire and its first 'Divine King', who in [the] early IX century established its first capital Hariharalaya (presently Roluos, Prasat Bakong District) [situated] just 14.5 km N of the type locality of the new subspecies." | | | |
| Macrovipera razii Oraie et al., 2018 | Snake | Abu Bakr al-Razi | A viper from Iran, named "in honour of Abu Bakr Muhammad ibn Zakariyya al-Razi (854–925 CE), a Persian polymath, physician, alchemist, philosopher, and important figure in the history of medicine. Macrovipera is one of the most medically important snakes in Iran, and historically, physicians like him have been involved in snake bite therapy." | | | |
| Magallana Salvi & Mariottini, 2017 | Bivalve | Ferdinand Magellan | A genus of oysters from the Pacific Ocean, "in honour of the Portuguese explorer Fernão de Magalhães (Ferdinand Magellan), who crossed the Pacific Ocean in the first circumnavigation of the Earth." | | | |
| Magallanes Navás, 1912 | Silky lacewing | Ferdinand Magellan | A genus created for an Australian species; "I have chosen the name of the genus in memory of the intrepid navigator who first visited the islands of Oceania". This genus was subsequently synonymised with Psychopsis Newman, 1842. | | | |
| Magallanes Ortea & Moro, 2020 | Sea slug | Ferdinand Magellan | "Named in honor of Ferdinand Magellan, a Portuguese sailor in the service of Charles I of Spain, who captained until his death on April 27, 1521, the first expedition that navigated around the world 500 years ago (1519-1521)."; This monotypic genus was proposed for the species Aeolidiopsis elcanoi (honouring Juan Sebastián Elcano), also in this list, but is invalid due to the existence of the senior homonym Magallanes Navás, 1912. | | | |
| Magellanana Girault, 1939 | Wasp | Ferdinand Magellan | This genus was subsequently synonymised with Epiblatticida Girault, 1915. | | | |
| Magellanium Masner & Huggert, 1989 | Wasp | Ferdinand Magellan | A genus of parasitoid wasps "Named in honour of Ferdinand Magellan, the discoverer of the Fuegian (Magellanic) part of Chile, where 1 undescribed species of this new genus is braving the harsh climate." | | | |
| Magnigondolella alexanderi † Golding & Orchard, 2018 | Conodont | Alexander the Great | "Named for Alexander the Great, King of Macedon." | | | |
| Magnigondolella cyri † Golding & Orchard, 2018 | Conodont | Cyrus the Great | "Named for Cyrus the Great, King of the Persians." | | | |
| Magnigondolella julii † Golding & Orchard, 2018 | Conodont | Julius Caesar | "Named for Gaius Julius Caesar, Dictator of the Roman Republic." | | | |
| Magnigondolella nebuchadnezzari † Golding & Orchard, 2018 | Conodont | Nebuchadnezzar II | "Named for Nebuchadnezzar II, King of Babylon." | | | |
| Magnigondolella salomae † Golding & Orchard, 2018 | Conodont | Salome Alexandra | "Named for Salome Alexandra, Queen of Judea." | | | |
| Mammuthus jeffersonii † Osborn, 1922 | Mammoth | Thomas Jefferson | Subsequently synonymised with Mammuthus columbi (also in this list, as Elephas columbi) | | | |
| Mantimalthinus bartholini † Fanti & Damgaard, 2019 | Beetle | Thomas Bartholin | A fossil soldier beetle found in Eocene Baltic amber, and named "In memory of the Danish physician, mathematician and theologian Thomas Bartholin [...]. He theorized that amber had to come from conifers and that it had been hardened in seawater. He was therefore also one of the pioneers of Danish amber research." | | | |
| Maoripsocus pedderi Schmidt & New, 2008 | Barklouse | John Pedder | This species is endemic to Tasmania, where Pedder was the first Chief Justice. | | | |
| Maoripsocus wedgei Schmidt & New, 2008 | Barklouse | John Helder Wedge | This species is endemic to Tasmania, where Wedge was a surveyor, explorer and politician. | | | |
| Marcopoloia Yakovlev & Zolotuhin, 2021 | Moth | Marco Polo | A genus of moths from East and Southeast Asia. | | | |
| Marcopoloia leloi Yakovlev & Zolotuhin, 2021 | Moth | Lê Lợi | A species of moth from Vietnam. | | | |
| Maymena roca Baert, 1990 | Spider | Inca Roca | This species is native to Peru. | | | |
| Medeotrogus rumii Sehnal, 2021 | Beetle | Rumi | A scarab beetle native to Iran, "named honour of Ya Hazrat i Mawlana Jalaludin Muhamad Rumi (1207–1273), well-known Persian poet, jurist, theologian, and Sufi mystic." | | | |
| Medeotrogus shamsi Sehnal, 2021 | Beetle | Shams Tabrizi | A scarab beetle native to Iran, "named in honour of Shams-i-Tabrizi (1185–1247), wandering dervish, spiritual instructor and friend of Ya Hazrat i Mawlana Jalaludin Muhamad Rumi." | | | |
| Megachile huascari Cockerell, 1912 | Bee | Huáscar | This species is native to Peru. | | | |
| Megalonyx jeffersonii † Desmarest, 1822 | Ground sloth | Thomas Jefferson | A fossil species from the Pleistocene of North America. The generic name Megalonyx ("Great claw") was first suggested by Jefferson himself in a paper he presented in 1797, credited as the beginning of vertebrate paleontology in North America. | | | |
| Megantereon cultridens roderici † Arribas & Garrido, 2008 | Saber-toothed cat | El Cid | A subspecies of the Megantereon type species, found in Pliocene deposits of Southern Spain. "Dedicated to Don Rodrigo Díaz de Vivar, an 11th century Castilian warrior (1048-1099 AD) known since his time as the Cid Campeador". | | | |
| Megaselia mithridatesi Hash, 2014 | Fly | Mithridates VI Eupator | "named for King Mithridates VI of Pontus (120–63 BC), who regularly ingested nonlethal amounts of poison to build up an immunity." This species is attracted to highly toxic defensive compounds produced by polydesmid millipedes. | | | |
| Megarhogas aspasiae Kittel, 2016 | Wasp | Aspasia | Replacement name for Megarhogas maculipennis Chen & He, 1997, which was preoccupied by Megarhogas maculipennis (Cameron, 1905). | | | |
| Megischus baogong Ge & Tan, 2022 | Wasp | Bao Zheng (a.k.a. Bao Gong) | "The species name is derived from a historical personage, Baogong, a minister in Song dynasty of China famous as a representative of justice, whose drama role named Heimian (black head), a special facial sketch in Chinese opera. We name the new species after Baogong because of its completely blackish head." | | | |
| Mekongbathynella jayavarmani Park, 2021 | Crustacean | Jayavarman II | A bathynellacean from Cambodia, whose name "is derived from Jayavarman II who is generally recognised as the founder of the Khmer Empire, the dominant civilisation on the Southeast Asian mainland until the mid 15th century." | | | |
| Mekongbathynella jayavarthoni Park, 2021 | Crustacean | Jayavarman VII | A bathynellacean from Cambodia, whose name "is derived from Jayavarthon, the civil-name of Jayavarman VII, who is generally recognised as the most powerful king of the Khmer Empire." | | | |
| Melychiopharis davincii Dupérré & Tapia, 2024 | Spider | Leonardo da Vinci | | | | |
| Mengciusornis † Wang, O'Connor, Zhou & Zhou, 2019 | Bird | Mencius | A genus of primitive birds from the Cretaceous of China. The name means "Mencius's bird". | | | |
| Meoneura grimmorum Stuke & Freidberg, 2017 | Fly | Brothers Grimm | Flies of the genus Meoneura are very small (1–2 mm). "The species is dedicated to Jacob and Wilhelm Grimm, who collected and published the German folklore, and made dwarfs famous, for example in the fairytale Snow White." Other species in the same genus were named concurrently after literary or folklore characters notable for their small size, such as Bilbo Baggins, King Goldemar, Nils Holgersson or Oskar Matzerath. | | | |
| Meoneura swifti Stuke, 2016 | Fly | Jonathan Swift | Flies of the genus Meoneura are very small (1–2 mm). Swift "demonstrated in... Gulliver's Travels, that small individuals might be very important." | | | |
| Mesernobius anawrahtai † Engel, 2010 | Beetle | Anawrahta | A fossil species found in Cretaceous Burmese amber. | | | |
| Mesochorus agnesiae Kittel, 2016 | Wasp | Maria Gaetana Agnesi | Replacement name for Mesochorus turgidus Kusigemati, 1985, which was preoccupied by Mesochorus turgidus Dasch, 1974. | | | |
| Metacasca copernici Girault, 1936 | Wasp | Nicolaus Copernicus | "To the Great Founder."; Genus Metacasca was subsequently synonymised with Bardylis. | | | |
| Metacryptoseius samanii Joharchi & Tavakal, 2023 | Mite | Ismail Samani | A parasitic mite from Tajikistan, "named in memory of Ismail Samani, the leader of the first nation of the Tajiks." | | | |
| Microchilo elgrecoi Błeszyński, 1966 | Moth | El Greco | | | | |
| Microchilo murilloi Błeszyński, 1966 | Moth | Bartolomé Esteban Murillo | | | | |
| Microhyla gadjahmadai Atmaja et al., 2018 | Frog | Gajah Mada | A rice frog endemic to Sumatra, Indonesia, whose name "honors the military leader and hero Gadjah Mada, who in the fourteenth century unified the whole of the Nusantara (i.e., Malay Archipelago) under the Javanese rule of the Hindu Majapahit Empire." | | | |
| Miomelon lautaroi † Nielsen & Frassinetti, 2007 | Sea snail | Lautaro | A fossil species from the Miocene of southern Chile, named "after Lautaro (1535–1557), important toqui (war-chief) of the Mapuche who defeated Pedro de Valdivia in the Battle of Tucapel in 1553 and remains a symbol of the struggle for freedom of the indigenous peoples of Chile." | | | |
| Miomelon pelantaroi † Nielsen & Frassinetti, 2007 | Sea snail | Pelantaro | A fossil species from the Miocene of southern Chile, named "after Pelantaro, cacique (chief) of the Mapuche, who drove the Spaniards out of southern Chile in 1598." | | | |
| Mirina confucius Zolotuhin & Witt, 2000 | Moth | Confucius | | | | |
| Mitra kamehameha Pilsbry, 1921 | Sea snail | Kamehameha I | Described from a specimen collected in Honolulu, Hawaii. Subsequently synonymised with Nebularia ustulata. | | | |
| Modisimus enriquillo Huber & Fischer, 2010 | Spider | Enriquillo | A cellar spider from the Dominican Republic, whose name "refers to Enriquillo, the Taino chief of the 1519 rebellion against Spanish subjugation." | | | |
| Modisimus makandal Huber & Fischer, 2010 | Spider | François Mackandal | A cellar spider from Hispaniola, whose name "refers to Makandal, a famous Maroon, or runaway slave, who tried to organize a mass slave uprising, but was betrayed and burned at the stake in 1758" | | | |
| Monoctenus cuauhtemoci De Lira, 2022 | Sawfly | Cuauhtémoc | "in honor of the last Aztec emperor, originally from the municipality of Ixcateopan, where the attack by this species of Monoctenus [on weeping juniper trees] occurred, and the mountain range where the infestations are located is known as the Cuauhtémoc mountain range." | | | |
| Monomorium moathi Sharaf & Collingwood, 2010 | Ant | Muadh ibn Jabal | A species native to Yemen, "named after the friend of Prophet Mohammed, Moath Ebn Jabal who was sent to Yemen to distribute Islam." | | | |
| Monstrobovella mancocapaci Kontschán, Ermilov & Friedrich, 2024 | Mite | Manco Cápac | This species is native to Peru. | | | |
| Moyeria hafezii † Ghavidel-Syooki & Piri-Kangarshahi, 2021 | Protist | Hafez | A fossil euglenoid from the Ordovician of Iran, whose name "Refers to Khwāja Shams-ud-Dīn Muḥammad Ḥāfeẓ-e Shīrāzī, the Persian poet known as Hafez and as "Hafiz" (born in 1315 ACE in Shiraz; died in 1390 ACE in the same city; buried in Tomb Hafez, Shiraz). He is famous for his lyrical poems, and his major work is Divān of Hafez." | | | |
| Mozartella Girault, 1926 | Wasp | Wolfgang Amadeus Mozart | | | | |
| Mozartella beethoveni Girault, 1926 | Wasp | Ludwig van Beethoven | Type species of Mozartella | | | |
| Multithecopora hypatiae † Wilson, 1963 | Coral | Hypatia | A fossil coral from the Carboniferous of Nevada, US. | | | |
| Muscideopsis goldsmithii Girault, 1915 | Wasp | Oliver Goldsmith | Subsequently transferred to genus Aphobetus. | | | |
| Mycobacterium franklinii Nogueira et al., 2015 | Bacterium | Benjamin Franklin | "pertaining to Benjamin Franklin, famous USA statesman and scientist from Pennsylvania where the first isolates originated." | | | |
| Myrmecium bolivari Candiani & Bonaldo, 2017 | Spider | Simón Bolívar | This ant-mimicking corinnid sac spider is native to Venezuela and Colombia. | | | |
| Myrmica dongi Chen, Zhou & Huang, 2016 | Ant | Dong Qichang | This species is native to Tibet, China. | | | |
| Myrmica huaii Chen, Zhou & Huang, 2016 | Ant | Huaisu | This species is native to Shaanxi, China. | | | |
| Myrmica liui Chen, Zhou & Huang, 2016 | Ant | Liu Gongquan | This species is native to Inner Mongolia, China. | | | |
| Myrmica mifui Chen, Zhou & Huang, 2016 | Ant | Mi Fu | This species is native to Shaanxi, China. | | | |
| Myrmica oui Chen, Zhou & Huang, 2016 | Ant | Ouyang Xun | This species is native to Guizhou, China. | | | |
| Myrmica wangi Chen, Zhou & Huang, 2016 | Ant | Wang Xizhi | This species is native to Shaanxi, China. | | | |
| Myrmica yani Chen, Zhou & Huang, 2016 | Ant | Yan Zhenqing | This species is native to Guizhou, China. | | | |
| Myrmozercon cyrusi Ghafarian & Joharchi, 2013 | Mite | Cyrus the Great | A parasite of ants found in Iran, "named in memory of Cyrus the Great (Old Persian: Kuruš; c. 600 BC or 576 BC–530 BC) was the first Achaemenian Emperor of Persia, as the "father of the Iranian nation", who issued a decree on his aims and policies, later hailed as his charter of the rights of nations." | | | |
| Mysmenopsis viracocha Baert, 1990 | Spider | Viracocha Inca | Six species of the genus Mysmenopsis, described from specimens collected in Peru, were named after the last six Sapa Incas before the Spanish conquest of the Inca Empire. | | | |
| Mysmenopsis pachacutec Baert, 1990 | Spider | Pachacuti | Six species of the genus Mysmenopsis, described from specimens collected in Peru, were named after the last six Sapa Incas before the Spanish conquest of the Inca Empire. | | | |
| Mysmenopsis yupanqui Baert, 1990 | Spider | Topa Inca Yupanqui | Six species of the genus Mysmenopsis, described from specimens collected in Peru, were named after the last six Sapa Incas before the Spanish conquest of the Inca Empire. | | | |
| Mysmenopsis capac Baert, 1990 | Spider | Huayna Capac | Six species of the genus Mysmenopsis, described from specimens collected in Peru, were named after the last six Sapa Incas before the Spanish conquest of the Inca Empire. | | | |
| Mysmenopsis huascar Baert, 1990 | Spider | Huáscar | Six species of the genus Mysmenopsis, described from specimens collected in Peru, were named after the last six Sapa Incas before the Spanish conquest of the Inca Empire. | | | |
| Mysmenopsis atahualpa Baert, 1990 | Spider | Atahualpa | Six species of the genus Mysmenopsis, described from specimens collected in Peru, were named after the last six Sapa Incas before the Spanish conquest of the Inca Empire. | | | |
| Mystus cyrusi Esmaeili et al., 2022 | Catfish | Cyrus the Great | A freshwater bagrid catfish from Iran. | | | |
| Napoleonaea P.Beauv. | Flowering plant | Napoleon | Palisot de Beauvois named the type species Napoleonaea imperialis | | | |
| Nassarius barbarossai † Landau, Harzhauser, İslamoğlu & Marques da Silva 2013 | Sea snail | Frederick I, Holy Roman Emperor | A fossil species from the Miocene of the Karaman basin, Turkey, "Named in honour of the German Holy Roman Emperor Frederick I Barbarossa, who occupied Karaman in 1190 AD." | | | |
| Nemacheilus cleopatra Freyhof & Serov, 2001 | Fish | Cleopatra VII | Named for the "brilliant" Queen of Egypt, comparing her "legendary beauty" to this loach's "elegant and beautiful" appearance. | | | |
| Nemastylis huyanae J.F.Macbr. | Flowering plant | Huayna Capac | This species is native to Peru. "The name commemorates King Huyana [sic], father of the last Inca kings, Huascar and Atahuallpa."; Subsequently transferred to genus Tigridia. | | | |
| Nemoptera bipennis boabdili Aistleitner, 1984 | Spoonwing | Muhammad XI of Granada | Named after Muhammad XI's Spanish name, Boabdil; this subspecies is native to the Province of Granada. | | | |
| Neobisium mendelssohni Ćurčić & Ćurčić, 2002 | Pseudoscorpion | Moses Mendelssohn | "After Moses Mendelssohn, a great German-Jewish philosopher, otherwise the grandfather of the famous composer Jacob Ludwig Felix Mendelssohn-Bartholdy" | | | |
| Neoguillauminia cleopatra (Baill., 1862) Croizat | Flowering plant | Cleopatra VII | | | | |
| Neogutierrezia galileoi Ocampo & Ruiz-Manzanos, 2010 | Beetle | Galileo Galilei | "We name this species in honour [of] Galileo Galilei. It has been 400 years since he invented the telescope, a major step for our knowledge of the Universe and a symbol of discovery." | | | |
| Neomphaloidella glucki Girault, 1915 | Wasp | Christoph Willibald Gluck | Subsequently synonymised with Sigmophora otys. | | | |
| Neomphaloidella schilleri Girault, 1915 | Wasp | Friedrich Schiller | Subsequently transferred to genus Aprostocetus. | | | |
| Neonympha mitchellii francisci Parshall & Kral, 1989 | Butterfly | Francis of Assisi | "We name the new subspecies in honor of Saint Francis of Assisi, known for kindness to animals and a love of natural beauty." | | | |
| Nesolestes ranavalona Schmidt, 1951 | Damselfly | Ranavalona I | This species is native to Madagascar. | | | |
| Nihoa raleighi Raven, 1994 | Spider | Sir Walter Raleigh | A brushed trapdoor spider endemic to New Guinea, named "For Sir Walter Raleigh, whose name was adopted for the world-wide sailing expedition." (referring to Operation Raleigh, since the specimen was collected by a member of this expedition). | | | |
| Nomada cleopatra Schwarz, 1989 | Bee | Cleopatra VII | The holotype and allotype of this North African species were collected in Egypt. | | | |
| Noronhomys vespuccii † Carleton and Olson, 1999 | Rodent | Amerigo Vespucci | An extinct rat from Fernando de Noronha island, Brazil. "The specific patronym of the extinct rodent refers to Amerigo Vespucci's disputed landfall on Fernando de Noronha in 1503 and his possible sighting of "very large rats" on that island. If the species Noronhomys vespuccii were alive in 1503, it became extinct shortly thereafter due to the usual anthropogenic causes that have extirpated so many vertebrate species on islands." | | | |
| Nothopsocus cooki Thornton & New, 1981 | Barklouse | John Cook (pirate) | A species of barklouse native to Robinson Crusoe Island "named after John Cook, a buccaneer who is reputed to have used the island as a refuge." Subsequently transferred to genus Euryphallus. | | | |
| Nothopsocus defoei Thornton & New, 1981 | Barklouse | Daniel Defoe | A species of barklouse native to Robinson Crusoe Island in the Juan Fernández archipelago, named after Daniel Defoe's famous novel Robinson Crusoe, which was in turn inspired by Alexander Selkirk's 4-year ordeal as a castaway on this island. Subsequently transferred to genus Euryphallus. | | | |
| Nothopsocus selkirki Thornton & New, 1981 | Barklouse | Alexander Selkirk | A species of barklouse native to Robinson Crusoe Island in the Juan Fernández archipelago, named after Daniel Defoe's famous novel Robinson Crusoe, which was in turn inspired by Alexander Selkirk's 4-year ordeal as a castaway on this island. Subsequently transferred to genus Euryphallus. | | | |
| Notocyphus anacaona Rodriguez & Pitts, 2012 | Wasp | Anacaona | A spider wasp from the Dominican Republic, "Named after a female Taino indigenous cacique who ruled the island of Hispaniola in 1492." | | | |
| Octactis kosciuszkoi † McCartney, 2022 | Silicoflagellate | Tadeusz Kościuszko | This species was described from fossils collected by the Deep Sea Drilling Project in sediments dating to the Miocene, and deposited at the University of Szczecin, Poland. It is "named after Tadeusz Kościuszko, who promoted Liberty for the United States and his home country of Poland in the late 1700s. The species name is also in recognition of the Kościuszko Foundation, which promotes academic exchanges between the two nations." | | | |
| Odontembia jacobi Miller, 2008 | Webspinner | Friedrich Heinrich Jacobi | "named after philosopher Friedrich Heinrich Jacobi, a critic of the philosopher Benedictus de Spinoza, whose name is similar to the other specific epithet in the genus, spinosa. | | | |
| Odostomia (Evalea) pocahontasae Henderson & Bartsch, 1914 | Sea snail | Pocahontas | This species was described from specimens collected in Chincoteague, Virginia. | | | |
| Oecobius dariusi Zamani & Marusik, 2023 | Spider | Darius the Great | A wall spider from Iran, "named after Darius I, who is more commonly known as Darius the Great. He was the third King of Kings of the Achaemenid Empire and reigned from 522 BCE until his death in 486 BCE. During his rule, the empire reached its territorial peak." | | | |
| Oecobius ferdowsii Mirshamsi, Zamani & Marusik, 2017 | Spider | Ferdowsi | A wall spider from Iran, "named after Abuʼl-Qasim Ferdowsi Tusi (c. 940–1020), a Persian poet and the author of Shahnameh, the national epic of the Greater Iran." | | | |
| Oecomys franciscorum Pardiñas et al., 2016 | Rodent | Francisco Maldonado da Silva and Pope Francis | A species of rice rat described from specimens collected in the Humid Chaco of Argentina and "dedicated to 2 Franciscos: the surgeon Francisco Maldonado da Silva (San Miguel de Tucumán, 1592–Lima, 1639); and the current Pope of the Catholic Church, Francisco (Jorge Mario Bergoglio; Buenos Aires, 1936). Maldonado da Silva was persecuted and burned by the Inquisition because he defended his freedom to practice the Jewish religion. Pope Francisco is championing a powerful discourse of understanding and reconciliation; in addition, his Encyclical Laudato si' (the "Green Encyclical" 24 May 2015) is viewed as a strong document in defense of the environment. The conjunction of both "Franciscos" in this specific epithet reflects our hope for a more inclusive and peaceful world". | | | |
| Oelschlaegera ferdowsii Fekrat, Hosseininejad, Derakhshan & Minaei, 2016 | Thrips | Ferdowsi | A species native to Razavi Khorasan province, Iran, "named in honor of Abuʼl-Qāsem Ferdowsi [...] a highly revered Persian poet and the author of the epic of Shahnameh (the Persian "Book of Kings"), which is the world's longest epic poem created by a single poet, and the national epic of Iran and the Persian-speaking world." Ferdowsi's birthplace is in Razavi Khorasan province as well. | | | |
| Offacolus † Orr et al., 2000 | Early Arthropod | Offa of Mercia | A fossil genus of euchelicerate arthropods from the Silurian Coalbrookdale Formation of Herefordshire, UK. "Generic name (Latin) after Offa, eighth century king of Mercia and colus, dwelling among, alluding, hereabouts, to Offa's dyke" (part of which runs through Herefordshire) | | | |
| Onyxacalles hannibali Germann, 2004 | Weevil | Hannibal | A species from Tunisia, "named after the daring Punic general Hannibal. Hannibal was best known for his spectacular, but also costly campaign with 40 war elephants in 218 BC from Spain, France across the Alps to Italy. In 202 BC, the Roman Empire was finally victorious over Hannibal at Carthage (Carthage, today part of the Tunisian capital Tunis). It was only with the victory over Hannibal that Rome gained supremacy in the western Mediterranean. The city of Carthage was finally razed to the ground in the Third Punic War (146 BC), the inhabitants expelled or taken into slavery by Rome. Let us hope that the last Ceratonia forests on Jebel Zaghouan, and with them the new species Onyxacalles hannibali, will not meet a similar fate in the progressive destruction of the last intact biotopes in central Tunisia!" | | | |
| Ooctonus saintpierrei Girault, 1913 | Wasp | Charles-Irénée Castel de Saint-Pierre | Subsequently transferred to the genus Boudiennyia. | | | |
| Oocyclus bolivari Short & García, 2010 | Beetle | Simón Bolívar | A species of water scavenger beetle native to Venezuela. | | | |
| Oodera leibnizi Werner & Peters, 2018 | Wasp | Gottfried Wilhelm Leibniz | "Named in honour of Gottfried Wilhelm Leibniz (1646–1716) on the occasion of [the 300th anniversary of his death]. The Zoologisches Forschungsmuseum Alexander Koenig in which this study was done is part of the Leibniz Association, named after Leibniz." | | | |
| Ooencyrtus ferdowsii Ebrahimi & Noyes, 2015 | Wasp | Ferdowsi | A parasitoid wasp from Iran; "The species name is dedicated to Ferdowsi, the great ancient Iranian poet, and also refers to Ferdows, where the type series were collected." | | | |
| Ootetrastichus grotiusi Girault, 1913 | Wasp | Hugo Grotius | Subsequently transferred to genus Aprostocetus. | | | |
| Opas O. Pickard-Cambridge, 1895 | Spider | Oppas | Subsequently synonymised with Leucauge. | | | |
| Opheliminus grotii Girault, 1913 | Wasp | Hugo Grotius | Subsequently transferred to genus Sympiesis | | | |
| Orchestina kamehameha Izquierdo, 2017 | Spider | Kamehameha I | This species is native to Hawaiʻi. | | | |
| Orchestina mancocapac Izquierdo, 2017 | Spider | Manco Cápac | "The specific name is a noun in apposition taken from Manco Cápac, the first governor and founder of the Inca culture in Cusco". This species is native to Peru, and the holotype was collected in Cusco. | | | |
| Orolestes koxingai Chen, 1950 | Damselfly | Koxinga | Subsequently synonymised with Orolestes selysi McLachlan, 1895. | | | |
| Ortyx montezumae Vigors, 1830 | Fowl | Moctezuma II | This species is native to Mexico. Subsequently transferred to genus Cyrtonyx. | | | |
| Oscheius cyrus Kuhestani, Karimi, Shokoohi & Makhdoumi, 2022 | Roundworm | Cyrus the Great | This species is native to Iran. | | | |
| Ovidia Meisn. | Flowering plant | Ovid | | | | |
| Ovidia Girault, 1924 | Wasp | Ovid | | | | |
| Ovis ammon polii Blyth, 1841 | Sheep | Marco Polo | A subspecies of argali known as Marco Polo sheep because he described them briefly in The Travels of Marco Polo: "Then there are sheep here as big as asses; and their tails are so large and fat, that one tail shall weigh some 30 lb. They are fine fat beasts, and afford capital mutton." | | | |
| Oxalis morelosii Pérez-Calix | Flowering plant | José María Morelos | "The specific epithet honours the Insurgent José María Morelos y Pavón (1765-1815). There are two reasons for this: first, his participation in the Mexican War of Independence; and second, because the plant was found in the mountainous region south of Morelia (formerly Valladolid), the city where J. M. Morelos y Pavón was born." | | | |
| Oxyacodon tecumsae † Van Valen, 1978 | Colugo | Tecumseh | A fossil mammal from the Paleocene of New Mexico. Originally classified as a condylarth, subsequently synonymised with Mixodectes malaris, a primitive colugo or flying lemur. | | | |
| Oxytrechus atahualpai Giachino & Allegro, 2021 | Beetle | Atahualpa | This species is native to Ecuador | | | |
| Pachycymbiola galvarinoi † Nielsen & Frassinetti, 2007 | Sea snail | Galvarino | A fossil species from the Miocene of southern Chile, named "after Galvarino, chief of the Mapuche. Galvarino fled from Spanish captivity after both his hands were severed, to continue his struggle against the invaders." | | | |
| Palaeorhoptrocentrus kanti † Belokobylskij, 2023 | Wasp | Immanuel Kant | A fossil species found in Eocene Baltic amber from Kaliningrad Oblast, "named in honour of great German philosopher Immanuel Kant, who was born, lived and died in Königsberg (= Kaliningrad), where he was buried." | | | |
| Palmanura goyai Palacios-Vargas & Simón-Benito, 2009 | Springtail | Francisco de Goya | | | | |
| Palmanura hieronimus Palacios-Vargas & Simón-Benito, 2009 | Springtail | Hieronymus Bosch | | | | |
| Palpimanus narsinhmehtai Prajapati, Hun & Raval, 2021 | Spider | Narsinh Mehta | "The specific epithet is dedicated to the great Indian poet saint, Narsinh Mehta. His belief in equality can be understood by his one of the famous poetry 'Vaishnav jan to', which became inspiration for Mahatma Gandhi." | | | |
| Pamphila confucius Felder & Felder, 1862 | Butterfly | Confucius | First identified in China, though it can be found in several other Asian countries. Subsequently transferred to the genus Potanthus. | | | |
| Pamphobeteus lapola Sherwood, Gabriel, Brescovit & Lucas, 2022 | Spider | Policarpa Salavarrieta | A tarantula from Colombia named "in honour of Policarpa Salavarrieta (1795–1817), known as La Pola, a heroine who gave her life for Colombian independence. The Day of the Colombian Woman commemorates her legacy on the 26th of January every year [sic; it's actually the 14th of November, the anniversary of her death]." | | | |
| Papilio cleopatra Linnaeus, 1767 | Butterfly | Cleopatra VII | Subsequently transferred to genus Gonepteryx. | | | |
| Papilio montezuma Westwood, 1842 | Butterfly | Moctezuma II | Subsequently transferred to genus Parides. | | | |
| Paraceratoneura goethei Girault, 1915 | Wasp | Johann Wolfgang von Goethe | Subsequently transferred to genus Ceratoneura. | | | |
| Paracetopsis atahualpa Vari, Ferraris & de Pinna, 2005 | Catfish | Atahualpa | "The species name [...] is in reference to Atahualpa who reigned from 1515 to 1533 as the last ruler of the Inca Empire that encompassed the region from which the population samples of this species originated." | | | |
| Paracobitis molavii Freyhof, Esmaeili, Sayyadzadeh & Geiger, 2014 | Fish | Rumi | A stone loach found in rivers of Iran and Iraq, "Named for Jalal ad-Din Muhammad Balkhi, also known as Jalal ad-Din Muhammad Rumi or simply Mowlavi, Molavi and Rumi, a Persian poet, jurist, theologian, and Sufi mystic." | | | |
| Paramicromerys nampoinai Huber, 2003 | Spider | Andrianampoinimerina | A cellar spider from Madagascar, "Named for Malagasy King Andrianampoinimerina (also Nampoina; died in 1810), a remarkable organizer and administrator who developed a complex social system and administrative structure without benefit of written records and therefore of bureaucracy." | | | |
| Paratirolites birunii † Korn et al., 2015 | Ammonite | Al-Biruni | A fossil from the Permian of the Aras river valley, on the border between Iran and Azerbaijan, named "After Abu al-Rayhan Muhammad ibn Ahmad al-Biruni (973-1048), a Persian Muslim scholar and polymath from the Khwarezm region." | | | |
| Paratrigonogastra voltairei Girault, 1915 | Wasp | Voltaire | Subsequently transferred to genus Sphegigaster. | | | |
| Parisopalpus defoei Švihla & Ramírez Fischer, 2012 | Beetle | Daniel Defoe | A species of false blister beetle endemic to Robinson Crusoe Island, "dedicated to the famous English writer, Daniel Defoe (1660–1731), author of the novel Robinson Crusoe. It is based on the true story of Alexander Selkirk, a Scottish sailor who spent four years and four months as a castaway, when he was marooned on the uninhabited island of Masatierra, later re-named Robinson Crusoe Island." | | | |
| Parotoplana pythagorae Delogu & Curini-Galletti, 2007 | Flatworm | Pythagoras | "species name relates to the presence, in the sclerotized structures, of peculiar right-angled triangles, to which Pythagoras' (Samos, 571-496 B.C.) most famous theorem refers." | | | |
| Paroxyna cleopatra Hering, 1937 | Fly | Cleopatra VII | Subsequently synonymised with Campiglossa messalina. | | | |
| Paroxyna messalina Hering, 1937 | Fly | Valeria Messalina | Subsequently transferred to the genus Campiglossa. | | | |
| Paryphostomum huaccaci Ibáñez, 1974 | Fluke | Yawar Waqaq | This species, a parasite of the turkey vulture, was described from specimens collected in Peru. It has subsequently been assigned the status of species inquirenda because of the poor state of conservation of the holotype. Furthermore, genus Paryphostomum has been synonymised with Petasiger. | | | |
| Pecten jeffersonius † Say, 1824 | Bivalve | Thomas Jefferson | Subsequently transferred to the genus Chesapecten. It is an abundant fossil scallop from the Pliocene of Virginia, Jefferson's home state, where it has been designated as the official state fossil. | | | |
| Pelayo O. Pickard-Cambridge, 1895 | Spider | Pelagius of Asturias | Subsequently synonymised with Josa. | | | |
| Pentadinium galileoi † Sancay, Bati, Edwards & Ertug, 2006 | Protist | Galileo Galilei | A fossil dinoflagellate from the Oligocene/Miocene of Eastern Turkey. "Named in honor of Galilei Galileo [sic] who first discovered rings around the planet Saturn." (the shape of this species resembles Saturn) | | | |
| Periclesia A.C.Sm. | Flowering plant | Pericles | "Flllowing Klotzsch's custom of naming genera of Vacciniaceae after historical figures [see, for example, Caligula, Psammisia, Socratesia, Sophoclesia, Themistoclesia, also in this list], this genus is dedicated to the Greek statesman Pericles." | | | |
| Perigrapha yasawii Volynkin, Titov & Knyazev, 2014 | Moth | Ahmad Yasawi | "The species name is dedicated to Khodja Ahmed Yasawi, a Turkic poet and Sufi, whose mausoleum is in Turkestan city, less than 40 km from the type locality." | | | |
| Petrolisthes haydni † Müller, 1984 | Crustacean | Joseph Haydn | A fossil species of porcelain crab from the Miocene of Austria, "Named after the great [composer], Joseph Haydn, who worked in Eisenstadt." (the type locality) | | | |
| Phalaena agrippina Cramer, 1776 | Moth | Julia the Younger | Derived from Julia the Younger's birth name Vipsania Agrippina. Subsequently transferred to the genus Thysania. | | | |
| Phanourios † Sondaar & Boekschoten, 1972 | Hippopotamus | Saint Phanourios | The bones were found at Agios Georgios, Cyprus. At the site, a chapel had been built into the fossiliferous rocks. The rock strata here are very rich in bone content (bone breccia). For centuries, villagers have gone there to collect these bones, which in their opinion are holy, because they are the petrified remains of Saint Fanourios. To honour the local tradition and to refer to the site, paleontologists Sondaar and Boekschoten named their new genus Phanourios, following the Greek spelling. The validity of this genus is disputed. | | | |
| Phascogalea thorbeckiana Schlegel, 1866 | Marsupial mammal | Johan Rudolph Thorbecke | "It is unnecessary to recall here the titles of the learned professor and famous statesman whose name the beautiful species we have just mentioned is destined to bear. Minister of the Interior until the last few days, he sanctioned the work of our naturalist travellers in the Indies and showed a keen interest in our great national establishment." Subsequently synonymised with Myoictis melas. | | | |
| Pheidole servilia Wilson, 2003 | Ant | Servilia (mother of Brutus) | | | | |
| Philotarsopsis hellyeri Schmidt & New, 2008 | Barklouse | Henry Hellyer | This species is endemic to Tasmania, where Hellyer was an early European surveyor and explorer. | | | |
| Pholcus phui Huber, 2011 | Spider | Sunthorn Phu | A cellar spider native to Thailand. Subsequently transferred to genus Tissahamia. | | | |
| Photinus ahuizotli Zaragoza-Caballero & Domínguez-León, 2020 | Firefly | Ahuitzotl | "The name alludes to the Mexica huey tlatoani Ahuizotl; given that during his government the architectural complex "Cuauhcalli" was built, an emblematic site in the region of Malinalco." (the type locality) | | | |
| Photinus tezozomoci Zaragoza-Caballero & Domínguez-León, 2020 | Firefly | Tezozomoc | "The specific epithet refers to the warrior Tezozómoc, ruler of Azcapotzalco, the municipality of what is now Mexico City, where the specimen was collected." | | | |
| Physalia mikazuki Yongstar, Ochiai & Lewis Ames, 2025 | Hydrozoan | Date Masamune | "The Japanese word "mikazuki" refers to the "crescent moon" shape of the warrior helmet worn by Samurai Masamune Date (1567 – 1636) of the Tohoku region who founded Sendai City [where the specimens were collected]. Vernacular "mikazuki no eboshi" (Japanese), "crescent helmet man-of-war" (English)." | | | |
| Physcus addisoni Girault, 1915 | Wasp | Joseph Addison | Subsequently transferred to genus Coccobius. | | | |
| Physcus popei Girault, 1915 | Wasp | Alexander Pope | Subsequently transferred to genus Coccobius. | | | |
| Pinus montezumae Lamb. | Conifer | Moctezuma II | | | | |
| Pinus tecunumanii F.Schwerdtf. ex Eguiluz & J.P.Perry | Conifer | Tecun Uman | "The taxon was first described in 1953 by a German forest entomologist, F. Schwerdtfeger, who had been appointed by FAO to investígate an epidemic of Dendroctonus sp. beetle which was devastating the pine forests of Guatemala. On arrival he found his work hampered by the lack of information on the taxonomy and distribution of the natural pine forests of the region, and was therefore forced to study the systematics of the local pines before commencing his entomological work. The Tecún Umán pine was the only species he encountered that he could not fit into the then existing classification systems. In 1953 Schwerdtfeger published a very full account of his new pine as P. tecumumanii (naming it after the last leader of the Quiche Indians in Guatemala who was killed in 1524 by Pedro de Alvarado of Spain during the conquest of the American Isthmus), clearly differentiating it from all the other local species." Schwerdtfeger's description was not validly published (for a variety of reasons), and it remained for Eguiluz and Perry (1983) to correct the error, maintaining Schwerdtfeger's name (though correcting the spelling). | | | |
| Pithecia isabela Marsh, 2014 | Primate | Isabel Godin des Odonais | A saki monkey from Peru, named in honor of Isabel Godin des Odonais and her grand journey across South America to reunite with her husband, paying tribute to "an amazing piece of South American history that absolutely needed proper recognition." | | | |
| Plato Coddington, 1986 | Spider | Plato | "The genus name [...] honors the Greek philosopher in referring to the strikingly cubical egg sacs that characterize the genus, as well as their partiality for caves." | | | |
| Platonia Mart. | Flowering plant | Plato | | | | |
| Platyclymenia ibnsinai † Korn, 1999 | Ammonite | Avicenna | A fossil clymeniid from the Devonian of Morocco, named "After Ibn Sina (Lat. Avicenna), *980 Afschana (Bokhara), †1037 Hamadan; physician and philosopher, the most important transmitter of Greek philosophy to the Orient." | | | |
| Platyptilia avicennai Ustjuzhanin & Kovtunovich, 2016 | Moth | Avicenna | This species is found Tajikistan, Afghanistan and Pakistan. | | | |
| Plectrohyla tecunumani Duellman & Campbell, 1984 | Frog | Tecun Uman | A spikethumb frog from Guatemala, named "for the Guatemalan national hero, Tecún Umán, the Quiché warrior prince who was killed in fierce hand-to-hand combat by Don Pedro de Alvarado on his march across the Guatemalan highlands." | | | |
| Plesiolacerta eratosthenesi † Čerňanský & Augé, 2013 | Lizard | Eratosthenes | A fossil wall lizard from the Oligocene of southern Germany, named "To recognize the contribution made by Eratosthenes of Cyrene. He was a Greek mathematician, elegiac poet, athlete, geographer and astronomer. He was the first person to prove that the Earth was round and calculate the circumference of the earth (with remarkable accuracy)." | | | |
| Plethodon sequoyah Highton, 1989 | Salamander | Sequoyah | | | | |
| Pleurothallis yupanki Luer & Vásquez | Orchid | Topa Inca Yupanqui | "Named in honor of the chieftain Inca Yupanki who built the stone buildings now lying in ruins east of Samaipata" (where the type specimens were found growing). Subsequently transferred to genus Dryadella. | | | |
| Pleurotropomyia grotiusi Girault, 1913 | Wasp | Hugo Grotius | Subsequently transferred to the genus Apleurotropis | | | |
| Plutarchia Girault, 1925 | Wasp | Plutarch | | | | |
| Plutarchia A.C.Sm. | Flowering plant | Plutarch | | | | |
| Podagrion worcesteri Girault, 1913 | Wasp | Noah Worcester | "Respectfully dedicated to Noah Worcester for his A Solemn Review of the Custom of War." | | | |
| Polyclita A.C.Sm. | Flowering plant | Polyclitus | | | | |
| Polynema aligherini Girault, 1915 | Wasp | Dante Alighieri | Subsequently transferred to genus Boccacciomymar (also in this list). | | | |
| Polynema franklini Girault, 1913 | Wasp | Benjamin Franklin | Subsequently transferred to the genus Palaeoneura. | | | |
| Polynema hegeli Girault, 1915 | Wasp | Georg Wilhelm Friedrich Hegel | Subsequently transferred to genus Palaeoneura. | | | |
| Polynema rousseaui Girault, 1913 | Wasp | Jean-Jacques Rousseau | Subsequently transferred to the genus Palaeoneura. | | | |
| Polyrhachis cleopatra Forel, 1902 | Ant | Cleopatra VII | | | | |
| Priscula bolivari Huber, 2020 | Spider | Simón Bolívar | "The species is named for Venezuelan military and political leader Simón Bolívar. Not having a single Venezuelan pholcid named for El Libertador would be inexcusable." | | | |
| Prosapia morelosi Castro-Valderrama, Romero & Carvalho, 2020 | Froghopper | José María Morelos | "Holotype and some paratypes were found for the first time in Morelia. The species is named in honour of the hero of Mexican independence, José María Morelos y Pavón, who was born in that city." | | | |
| Prunum adelantado Espinosa & Ortea, 2018 | Sea snail | Pedro Menéndez de Avilés | "Named in honour of the Spanish soldier and sailor Pedro Menéndez de Avilés, on the 500th anniversary of his birth in Avilés, Asturias (15 February 1519); known as the Adelantado de La Florida for reconquering Florida in 1565 and founding the city of Saint Augustine." | | | |
| Psammisia Klotszch | Flowering plant | Psamtik II | After Psammis, the name used by Herodotus to refer to Psamtik II. | | | |
| Pseudicius rudakii Prószyński, 1992 | Spider | Rudaki | A jumping spider described from a holotype collected in Shiraz, Iran, "named in honour of great Persian-Tadjik poet RUDAKI who once wrote a poem [about] a girl from Shiraz."; Subsequently transferred to genus Rudakius, also in this list. | | | |
| Pseudiglyphus grotiusi Girault, 1915 | Wasp | Hugo Grotius | | | | |
| Pseudoeurycea ahuitzotl Adler, 1996 | Salamander | Ahuitzotl | A false brook salamander from the state of Guerrero, Mexico. | | | |
| Pterostichus (Morphohaptoderus) confucius Sciaky & Wrase, 1997 | Beetle | Confucius | A ground beetle native to Shaanxi, China. | | | |
| Pterostichus (Morphohaptoderus) quyuani Wu, Chen & Shi, 2025 | Beetle | Qu Yuan | A ground beetle native to Hubei, China "named after Qu Yuan (屈原), a renowned poet and statesman in ancient China who lived in the State of Chu (centered around today's Hubei Province) during the Warring States Period. His works, like "Li Sao," shaped Chu Ci (also known as Songs of Chu, a significant genre in ancient Chinese literature)." Another nine new species described in the same paper were named after Qu Yuan's poems. | | | |
| Ptycta freycineti Schmidt & New, 2008 | Barklouse | Louis de Freycinet | This species is endemic to Tasmania. | | | |
| Pulex cheopis Rothschild, 1903 | Flea | Khufu | From Khufu's Hellenized name Cheops; it has been subsequently moved to the genus Xenopsylla. Known as the Oriental rat flea, tropical rat flea, or plague flea, it is a parasite of rodents, particularly Rattus, and is a primary vector for bubonic plague and murine typhus. Having lived in the 26th century BC, Khufu is the most ancient person to have an eponymous organism. | | | |
| Purpuricenus comenius Vartanis & Ambrus, 2015 | Beetle | John Amos Comenius | A longhorn beetle from Greece described by Czech scientists and "dedicated to the famous Czech philosopher, pedagogue and theologian Jan Amos Komenský, who was born in Uherský Brod, on 25th March 1592. Jan Amos Komenský is considered a founder of the modern pedagogy and he has earned a nickname Teacher of Nations." | | | |
| Pycnotropis zumbii Golovatch, Vohland & Hoffman, 1998 | Millipede | Zumbi dos Palmares | | | | |
| Pythagoracypris † Santos Filho, Fauth & Sames, 2020 | Crustacean | Pythagoras | A genus of fossil ostracods from the Cretaceous of Brazil, "Named after the Greek philosopher Pythagoras and his theorem, due to the sub-triangular outline of the genus in lateral view." | | | |
| Quamtana nandi Huber, 2003 | Spider | Nandi | A cellar spider native to South Africa, "Named after Nandi, Queen of Zululand (1778–1826). To this day, the Zulu people use her name to refer to a woman of high esteem." | | | |
| Quijote cervantesi Ortea, Moro & Bacallado, 2016 | Sea snail | Miguel de Cervantes | Generic name comes from his book Don Quijote de la Mancha | | | |
| Raffaellia Girault, 1922 | Wasp | Raphael | | | | |
| Ramsaria avicennae Heidari & Hauer, 2018 | Bacterium | Avicenna | Isolated form thermal springs in Iran. | | | |
| Rana montezumae Baird, 1854 | Frog | Moctezuma II | Subsequently transferred to the genus Lithobates. | | | |
| Raphaelana Girault 1926 | Wasp | Raphael | Subsequently synonymised with the genus Cheiloneurus. | | | |
| Raphaelonia Girault 1924 | Wasp | Raphael | Subsequently synonymised with the genus Omphale. | | | |
| Raphitoma vercingetorixi † Ceulemans, Van Dingenen & Landau, 2018 | Sea snail | Vercingetorix | A fossil species from the Pliocene of western France. | | | |
| Rhicnopeltomyia voltairei Girault, 1915 | Wasp | Voltaire | Subsequently transferred to genus Chrysonotomyia. | | | |
| Rhipidomella cervantesi † García-Alcalde, 2015 | Brachiopod | Miguel de Cervantes | A fossil orthid from the Devonian of Spain, "Dedicated to the Spanish writer Miguel de Cervantes y Saavedra, as a tribute to his masterful literary style." | | | |
| Rhizococcus avicennae Moghaddam, 2018 | Scale insect | Avicenna | "The new species is named after Avicenna (Abu Ali Sina), Persian philosopher and scientist (ca. 980–1037) who lived in Hamadan, Iran." (the type locality) | | | |
| Rhizothrix sejongi Nam & Lee, 2005 | Crustacean | Sejong the Great | A copepod collected from the coast of South Korea, whose name "honors King Sejong the Great, who during his reign (1418–1450) made many cultural and scientific innovations and devised the Korean Hangeul alphabet." | | | |
| Richteria Girault, 1920 | Wasp | Jean Paul | Derived from Paul's birth name, Johann Paul Friedrich Richter | | | |
| Roussea Sm. | Flowering plant | Jean-Jacques Rousseau | "In memory of the most renowned Jean Jacques Rousseau, who wrote the most pleasant letters on the subject of botany, and cherished and enriched the amiable science till the last breath." According to Smith, Carl Linnaeus, who often corresponded with Rousseau, had intended to dedicate a plant to him but did not manage to get it published before his death, so Roussea was named to correct this. | | | |
| Rubus boudiccae A.L.Bull & Edees | Flowering plant | Boudica | A species of bramble native to East Anglia, England, whose name "commemorates the East Anglian queen who defied the Romans." | | | |
| Rudakius Prószyński, 2016 | Spider | Rudaki | "Named in honor of great Persian poet Rudaki (850-940 n.e.) who lived in the Samanid court in Buchara (present day Uzbekistan) – in the area of occurrence of this genus." | | | |
| Rusophycus leifeirikssoni † Bergström, 1976 | Trilobite trace fossil | Leif Erikson | An ichnospecies identified from the Ordovician of Bell Island (Newfoundland and Labrador), and named "After another early being, the Greenland viking Leif Eiriksson, who left his traces on Newfoundland (Vinland) about 1000 years ago." | | | |
| Sanmai kongi † Chen, Zhang & B. Wang, 2016 | Cicada | Confucius | A fossil species from the Jurassic of China, named "In reference to the family name of Confucius (Kung Fu-Tsy), the founder of Confucianism." | | | |
| Sanmai mengi † Chen, Zhang & B. Wang, 2016 | Cicada | Mencius | A fossil species from the Jurassic of China, named "In reference to the family name of Mencius (Meng Tsy), one of the sages of Confucianism." | | | |
| Sanmai xuni † Chen, Zhang & B. Wang, 2016 | Cicada | Xunzi | A fossil species from the Jurassic of China, named "In reference to the family name of Xuncius (Xun Tsy), one of the sages of Confucianism." | | | |
| Sappho Reichenbach, 1849 | Hummingbird | Sappho | | | | |
| Saurothera merlini d'Orbigny, 1839 | Bird | Maria de las Mercedes Santa Cruz y Montalvo | A species of cuckoo native to Cuba and Bahamas, "dedicated to the Lady Doña María de las Mercedes Jaruco, Countess of Merlin, a Havana native famous for her talents in literature and the fine arts, which she cultivates and protects with equal enthusiasm and success in Paris, of whose cultured society she is a beautiful ornament." Subsequently transferred to genus Coccyzus. | | | |
| Scabricola lavoisieri Guillot de Suduiraut, 2002 | Sea snail | Antoine Lavoisier | "This new species is named in memory of Antoine Laurent de Lavoisier (1743-1794), father of modern chemistry and ancestor of the author." | | | |
| Schilleria Girault, 1932 | Wasp | Friedrich Schiller | Its nomen novum is Schilleriella Ghesquiere, 1946 | | | |
| Schinderhannes † Kühl, Briggs & Rust, 2009 | Early Arthropod | Schinderhannes | A fossil radiodont from the Devonian of Germany. The single specimen was discovered in Hunsrück slates near Bundenbach, and is named after the 18th-century outlaw Schinderhannes who frequented this area. | | | |
| Scipionyx † Dal Sasso & Signore, 1998 | Dinosaur | Scipio Africanus | This was the first dinosaur ever to be found in Italy, and it was "dedicated to Scipione Breislak, who first described the Pietraroja Plattenkalk [where the specimen was found], and Publius Cornelius Scipio (nicknamed Africanus), consul militaris of the Roman Army, who fought in the Mediterranean area" | | | |
| Scirtothrips hafezi Minaei & Mound, 2018 | Thrips | Hafez | A tamarisk-infesting thrips found in Fars province, Iran; "Khaje Shams-ud-Diin Muḥammad Ḥafeẓ-e Shirazi, known by his pen name Hafez (1325/26–1389/90) was a Persian poet whose collected works are regarded as a pinnacle of Persian literature. His mausoleum is located in the city of Shiraz, capital of Fars province, southern Iran. Hafez Tomb is regarded as one of most famous attractions in Shiraz." | | | |
| Sciurus aberti Woodhouse, 1853 | Squirrel | John James Abert | | | | |
| Scolopax rochussenii Schlegel, 1866 | Bird | Jan Jacob Rochussen | "We dedicate this curious species to His Excellency the Minister of State, Mr. Rochussen, former Governor-General of the Dutch Indies and former Minister of the Colonies, who gave the impetus to the recent exploration of New Guinea by the expedition of the sailing ship Etna, and by entrusting to the late Bernstein the honourable mission of carrying out scientific research in these distant and almost unknown regions." | | | |
| Segutilum cornelii Whitley, 1944 | Fish | Jeronimus Cornelisz | "I name this fish after the "villain" of the Batavia mutiny which, more than 300 years ago, occurred by the place where it was caught" (the Houtman Abrolhos islands). Genus Segutilum was subsequently synonymised with Kyphosus. | | | |
| Selenops anacaona Crews, 2018 | Spider | Anacaona | "The specific epithet is in honor of Anacaona, a Taíno cacica of the cacicazgo of Jaragua, where they [sic] type specimen was collected. Anacaona was arrested for resisting occupation by the Spanish, then executed when she refused to become a concubine for the Spaniards" | | | |
| Selenops caonabo Crews, 2018 | Spider | Caonabo | "The specific epithet is in honor of Caonabo, a Taíno cacique and husband of Anacaona, who was from the cacicazgo of Maguana, which encompasses the present-day range of the species. Caonabo resisted the Spanish and destroyed Fort La Navidad before being captured and taken back to Spain by Columbus; however, he died on the way in a shipwreck" | | | |
| Selitrichodelia mesmeri Girault, 1915 | Wasp | Franz Anton Mesmer | Subsequently transferred to genus Aprostocetus. | | | |
| Sellaclymenia ibntufayli † Korn, 1999 | Ammonite | Ibn Tufail | A fossil clymeniid from the Devonian of Morocco, named "After Ibn Tufayl (lat. Abubacer), *1115 Guadix, †1185 Marrakech; Arab physician and philosopher (By observation and reflection up to the highest levels of natural and divine cognition)." | | | |
| Semnopithecus roxellana Milne-Edwards, 1870 | Primate | Roxelana | The specific epithet of the golden-snub nosed monkey from China refers to the chief consort and wife of Suleiman the Magnificent, Hurrem Sultan, also known as Roxolana or Roxelana ("the Russian woman"), who, like her namesake, had reddish gold hair and, by some accounts, a snub nose. Subsequently transferred to genus Rhinopithecus. | | | |
| Sequoia Endl. | Conifer | Sequoyah | The derivation of Sequoia from "Sequoyah" is controversial since the botanist who coined it left no record of the etymology. | | | |
| Shakespearia Girault, 1928 | Wasp | William Shakespeare | Subsequently synonymised with Psyllaephagus Ashmead, 1900 | | | |
| Shankouia zhenghei † Chen, Wang, Maas & Waloszek, 2005 | Early Arthropod | Zheng He | An early marine arthropod found in the Maotianshan Shales, Cambrian deposits in Yunnan, China. It is named "in honor of [the] great mariner of the Ming dynasty, Zheng He (1371–1435), who sailed from China to many places throughout [the] South Pacific, Indian Ocean, Taiwan, Persian Gulf and distant Africa in seven epic voyages from 1405 to 1433. He was born near Jinning close to the fossil locality and was buried in the southern outskirts of Bull's Head Hill (Niushou) in Nanjing, China."; This species was subsequently synonymised with Liangwangshania biloba. | | | |
| Sigaloceras (Gulielmina) fabricius † Mönnig & Dietl, 2022 | Ammonite | Johannes Fabricius | | | | |
| Signiphora beethoveni Girault, 1915 | Wasp | Ludwig van Beethoven | Subsequently transferred to genus Chartocerus. | | | |
| Silene ferdowsii Joharchi, Nejati & F.Ghahrem. | Flowering plant | Ferdowsi | A species of catchfly native to Razavi Khorasan province, Iran, whose name "honours Hakim Abolghasem Ferdowsi Toosi (935–1020 AD), one of the greatest Iranian poets; his tomb is located in Toos town, near to Mashhad, Khorassan province, Iran." | | | |
| Socratesia Klotszch | Flowering plant | Socrates | Subsequently synonymised with Cavendishia. | | | |
| Sophoclesia Klotszch | Flowering plant | Sophocles | Subsequently synonymised with Sphyrospermum. | | | |
| Spalangia grotiusi Girault, 1913 | Wasp | Hugo Grotius | | | | |
| Spartacus Distant, 1884 | True bug | Spartacus | | | | |
| Spilochalcis kanti Girault, 1913 | Wasp | Emmanuel Kant | "Dedicated to Immanual [sic] Kant for his work On Perpetual Peace."; Subsequently synonymised with Conura maculata. | | | |
| Spilochalcis laddi Girault, 1913 | Wasp | William Ladd | Subsequently transferred to genus Conura. | | | |
| Stauroneis clarkii Bahls, 2012 | Diatom | William Clark | "Named after William Clark (1770–1838), an early 19th Century Montana explorer." The holotype for this species was collected from a spring at the base of Square Butte, Chouteau County, Montana. | | | |
| Stauroneis lewisii Bahls, 2012 | Diatom | Meriwether Lewis | "Named after Meriwether Lewis (1774–1809), an early 19th Century Montana explorer." The holotype for this species was collected from Blodgett Lake in Ravalli County, Montana. | | | |
| Stauroneis sacajaweae Bahls, 2012 | Diatom | Sacagawea | "Named after the Lemhi Shoshone woman, Sacajawea (1788–1812?), who served as guide and interpreter for Lewis and Clark". | | | |
| Stauroneis thompsonii Bahls, 2012 | Diatom | David Thompson | "Named for David Thompson (1770–1857), an early 19th Century Montana explorer and cartographer". The holotype for this species was collected from Upper Wolverine Lake in Kootenai National Forest, Lincoln County, Montana. | | | |
| Stenus bolivari Puthz, 2015 | Beetle | Simón Bolívar | A rove beetle native to Venezuela, whose name "honour[s] Simon Bolivar (1783-1830), the liberator of South America from Spanish rule." | | | |
| Stenus chimalpopoca Puthz, 2015 | Beetle | Chimalpopoca | "I choose for this Mexican species the name of the Aztec king Chimalpopoca (1417-1426), the successor of Huitzilihuitl." | | | |
| Stenus ojedai Puthz, 2015 | Beetle | Alonso de Ojeda | A rove beetle native to Venezuela, whose name "recall[s] Alonso de Ojeda, who, together with Amerigo Vespucci and Martín Fernández de Enciso, undertook an expedition to Venezuela in 1499, from which the name "Venezuela" is said to have been coined". | | | |
| Stenus vespuccii Puthz, 2015 | Beetle | Amerigo Vespucci | A rove beetle native to Venezuela, whose name "recall[s] Amerigo Vespucci, who, together with Alonso de Ojeda and Martín Fernández de Enciso, undertook an expedition to Venezuela in 1499, from which the name "Venezuela" is said to have been coined". | | | |
| Stethynium daltoni Girault, 1912 | Wasp | John Dalton | "Dedicated to the discoverer of the atomic theory in chemistry." | | | |
| Stethynium lavoisieri Girault, 1912 | Wasp | Antoine Lavoisier | "Dedicated to the discoverer of the law of the conservation of matter." | | | |
| Stethynium vesalii Girault, 1912 | Wasp | Andreas Vesalius | "Dedicated to Andreas Vesalius, one of the earliest men of the present civilisation to assert the right of free thought and independent mentality." | | | |
| Sticta narinioana B. Moncada, Ossowska & Lücking (2022) | Lichen | Antonio Nariño | "The epithet honours Antonio Amador José Nariño (y Álvarez del Casal) (1765–1823), one of the critical architects of the independence of Colombia and after whom the Department of Nariño [where the type locality is] was named." | | | |
| Stigmella sanmartini Remeikis & Stonis, 2017 | Moth | José de San Martín | "Despite the name of the type locality [...] (San Martin de los Andes), the species is named not after the locality, but in honor of Argentine general José de San Martín (1778–1850). A national hero of Argentina and Peru, he played a significant role in the southern part of South America's successful struggle for independence from the Spanish Empire." | | | |
| Stilbula ashokai Narendran, 1996 | Wasp | Ashoka | This species is native to India. | | | |
| Strelitzia reginae Banks | Flowering plant | Charlotte of Mecklenburg-Strelitz | | | | |
| Stumpffia froschaueri Crottini et al., 2020 | Frog | Christoph Froschauer | "honouring Christoph Froschauer (ca. 1490 – April 1564). His family name means "the man from the floodplain full of frogs". Froschauer was the first, and European wide renowned, printer in Zürich and he used to sign his books with a woodcut showing frogs under a tree in a landscape. He was notably known for printing Conrad Gessner's encyclopaedic Historia animalium and the "Zürich Bible", a complete translation into German of the Bible several years before Luther's Bible appeared. Froschauer published works by Zwingli, Bullinger, Gessner, Erasmus von Rotterdam and Luther during his lifetime. His activity represents the nucleus of the Orell Füssli publishing house, which celebrated its 500th birthday on 9 November 2019, which is the date he was given citizenship in Zürich as a gift for his art." | | | |
| Stygonitocrella sequoyahi Reid, Hunt & Stanley | Crustacean | Sequoyah | A freshwater copepod found in streambeds of Arkansas and Oklahoma. "The species name honors the great educator and inventor of the Cherokee Indian alphabet, Sequoyah (George Gist)." | | | |
| Syagriotermes † Engel, Nel & Perrichot, 2011 | Termite | Syagrius | A fossil genus found in Cretaceous amber from France. "The new genus-group name is a combination of Syagrius (430–486/7 AD), the last Roman 'magister militum' of ancient Gaul (eventually being overrun by Clovis I of the Salian Franks), and 'Termes', common generic suffix in the Isoptera" | | | |
| Synapturanus ajuricaba Fouquet et al., 2021 | Frog | Ajuricaba | A disc frog from Northern Brazil named "as a reference to the legendary indigenous figure, Ajuricaba, a prominent leader of the Manaós indigenous people—considered extinct. They were one of the most important tribes of the Rio Negro. Ajuricaba led several incursions by the Manaós and allied groups against European settlements in the Rio Negro region. For his effort and leadership, he became one of the symbols of indigenous resistance against European colonization. Ajuricaba was eventually captured and was to be conducted to Belém, probably to be enslaved. History tells that during his transport to the capital, while still in chains, Ajuricaba and his men rebelled against captors, killing several of them. Eventually losing the battle, the survivors, including Ajuricaba, jumped into the waters of the Amazon River and were never seen again." | | | |
| Syrigma sanctimartini † Campbell, 1979 | Bird | José de San Martín | A fossil species of heron from the Pleistocene epoch, found in the Talara Tar Seeps of northwestern Peru, and "named for José de San Martín, who proclaimed Peruvian independence at Lima on July 28, 1821." | | | |
| Systasis henrici Girault, 1913 | Wasp | Henry IV of France | "Respectfully dedicated to Henri the Fourth of France, King of Navarre, who originated the idea of perpetual peace among nations." | | | |
| Taksinus Songsangchote, Sippawat, Khaikaew & Chomphuphuang, 2022 | Spider | Taksin the Great | A genus of tarantulas native to Thailand, named "in honor of Taksin the Great, king of the Thonburi Kingdom, in commemoration of his early career." | | | |
| Tamerlanius Keith, Sabatinelli & Uliana, 2015 | Beetle | Timur | A subgenus of Pharaonus; its name is derived "From Tamerlane, historically known as Timur, the founder of the Timurid empire, in whose area this generic taxon is distributed." | | | |
| Tanytermes anawrahtai † Engel, Grimaldi & Krishna, 2007 | Termite | Anawrahta | A fossil species found in Cretaceous Burmese amber. "The specific epithet is a patronymic honoring King Anawrahta who reigned from 1044 AD until his death in 1077, and the first ruler of a unified Burmese Empire who also converted the country to Theravada Buddhism." | | | |
| Taophila davincii Platania & Gómez-Zurita, 2021 | Beetle | Leonardo da Vinci | "Species named after the Tuscan polyhedral Renaissance genius of Leonardo da Vinci (1459–1519), also to homage and remember the 500th anniversary of his death, in the year when we started this revision." | | | |
| Tassonia Girault, 1921 | Wasp | Alessandro Tassoni | | | | |
| Tataouinea hannibalis Fanti, Cau, Hassine & Contessi, 2013 | Dinosaur | Hannibal | A sauropod from the Cretaceous of Tataouine Governorate, Tunisia, whose "species name refers to Hannibal Barca (247-183 BC), Carthaginian military commander who marched an army including war elephants across Southern Europe." | | | |
| Tecunumania Standl. & Steyerm. | Flowering plant | Tecun Uman | A genus created for a species of gourd first collected in mountain forests of Guatemala; "The generic name is derived from that of Tecún Umán, hero and leader of the Indians of western Guatemala, who fought so heroically to resist the Spanish invaders, but were finally overthrown and dispersed in a bloody battle near the site of the present city of Quetzaltenango." | | | |
| Tegenaria arsacia Zamani & Marusik, 2019 | Spider | Arsaces I of Parthia | A funnel weaver spider from Iran, named after the founder of the Parthian Empire, which was located in present-day Iran. | | | |
| Telmatobius atahualpai Wiens, 1993 | Frog | Atahualpa | This species is native to Peru. | | | |
| Tetrapturus herschelii Gray, 1838 | Fish | John Herschel | "The fish having been discovered during the visit of Sir John Herschel at the Cape [of Good Hope], I have named it in honour of him." Subsequently synonymised with Makaira nigricans. | | | |
| Tetrastichus saintpierrei Girault, 1913 | Wasp | Charles-Irénée Castel de Saint-Pierre | "Respectfully dedicated to the Abbe Saint-Pierre for his The Project of Perpetual Peace."; Subsequently transferred to genus Aprostocetus. | | | |
| Tetrastichus laddi Girault, 1913 | Wasp | William Ladd | | | | |
| Teudis O. Pickard-Cambridge, 1895 | Spider | Theudis | | | | |
| Thalassidroma hornbyi Gray, 1853 | Bird | Phipps Hornby | Hornby had collected the holotype. The species has since been transferred to the genus Oceanodroma. | | | |
| Thalassobacillus cyri Sánchez-Porro et al. 2009 | Bacterium | Cyrus the Great | A bacterium collected from a hypersaline lake in Iran, "named after Cyrus, the first king of Persia, where the type strain was isolated." | | | |
| Thalassozetes balboa Pfingstl, Lienhard & Baumann, 2019 | Mite | Vasco Núñez de Balboa | "As this species was found in Panama and Florida, the name was chosen to somehow relate to both locations. The specific epithet "balboa" (given as noun in apposition) refers to the Spanish explorer Vasco Núñez de Balboa; he led the first European expedition that crossed the Isthmus of Panama in 1513 and the Panamanian currency is named after him. It also refers to Rocky Balboa, a well-known movie character, a descendant of immigrants who made his fortune in the USA. The new species similarly may be an immigrant that has now successfully settled in North America. Moreover, T. balboa sp. nov. was predominantly found on "rocky" substrate." (see also List of organisms named after works of fiction) | | | |
| Thalesanna Girault, 1938 | Wasp | Thales of Miletus | Subsequently synonymised with Aphelinoidea. | | | |
| Thamnolecania yunusii Halıcı, Güllü, Bölükbaşı & Kahraman | Fungus | Yunus Emre | This lichenized fungus from Antarctica was described by Turkish scientists; "Yunus Emre, who passed away 700 years ago, especially examined the love of humanity and nature in his poems. In order to keep the name of this important heartfelt person alive in nature, we decided to name the new species after him." | | | |
| Thecla acis casasi Comstock & Huntington, 1943 | Butterfly | Bartolomé de las Casas | This subspecies, native to Cuba, is "named for Bartolomé de Las Casas (1474-1566), a Dominican friar, known as the 'Apostle of the Indies.'". Subsequently transferred to genus Strymon. | | | |
| Thecla acis petioni Comstock & Huntington, 1943 | Butterfly | Alexandre Pétion | This subspecies is native to Haiti. Subsequently transferred to genus Strymon. | | | |
| Thecla angelia boyeri Comstock & Huntington, 1943 | Butterfly | Jean Pierre Boyer | This subspecies is native to Hispaniola. Subsequently transferred to genus Electrostrymon. | | | |
| Thecla christophei Comstock & Huntington, 1943 | Butterfly | Henri Christophe | This species is native to Hispaniola. Subsequently transferred to genus Strymon. | | | |
| Thecla toussainti Comstock & Huntington, 1943 | Butterfly | Toussaint Louverture | This species is native to Haiti. Subsequently transferred to genus Strymon. | | | |
| Themistoclesia Klotszch | Flowering plant | Themistocles | | | | |
| Thliphthisa sapphus Gutermann | Flowering plant | Sappho | A narrow endemic of the white cliffs of Lefkátas on the southwest coast of Lefkada (Greece), whose name "commemorates Sappho, the most famous poetess of the Classical Hellenic Era [sic; she actually lived in the Archaic period] and refers to the traditional (though non-historical) believe [sic] she suicidally threw herself from the white cliffs of Lefkátas because of unrequited love for beautiful young Phaon." | | | |
| Thorectes shankara Carpaneto & Mignani, 1999 | Beetle | Adi Shankara | A dor beetle species described from specimens collected near Kedarnath, India, "named to honour the Indian philosopher Shankara (dead at Kedarnath about 750 AD)." | | | |
| Tianyulong confuciusi † Zheng, You, Xu & Dong, 2009 | Dinosaur | Confucius | A Heterodontosaurid from the Cretaceous of Liaoning, China, "dedicated to Confucius, the founder of Confucianism." | | | |
| Tilicrassatella sanmartini † Devries, 2016 | Bivalve | José de San Martín | A fossil species from the Oligocene and Miocene of Peru, "Named in honor of José de San Martín (1778–1850), a liberator of Argentina and Peru." | | | |
| Timea clippertoni van Soest, Kaiser & Van Syoc, 2011 | Sponge | John Clipperton | This species was described from specimens collected in Clipperton Island, and named after the island's discoverer. | | | |
| Timurlengia † Brusatte et al., 2016 | Dinosaur | Timur | A horse-sized tyrannosauroid from the mid-Cretaceous of Uzbekistan, named "in reference to the fourteenth-century Central Asian ruler Timurleng (English: Tamerlane)", who was born in present-day Shahrisabz, Uzbekistan. | | | |
| Tmeticus defoei Pickard-Cambridge, 1899 | Spider | Daniel Defoe | A species of spider endemic to Juan Fernández Islands, where Scottish sailor Alexander Selkirk was marooned for over 4 years, inspiring Defoe's famous novel Robinson Crusoe. Subsequently transferred to genus Neomaso. | | | |
| Tolegnaro kepleri Álvarez-Padilla, Ubick & Griswold, 2012 | Spider | Johannes Kepler | A species of goblin spider endemic to Madagascar. | | | |
| Torricellia DC. | Flowering plant | Evangelista Torricelli | This genus, "arising in the highest mountains, I have dedicated to the physicist Torricelli, who, by the invention of the barometer, enabled the measurement of mountains, and for this reason deserves much respect in botany." | | | |
| Trechisibus tupackatarianus Trezzi & Guzzetti, 2015 | Beetle | Túpac Katari | This species is native to Bolivia. | | | |
| Trechus kouroshi Muilwijk & Seiedy & Wrase, 2021 | Beetle | Cyrus the Great | A ground beetle from Iran, whose name "refers to Koerosh (Cyrus the Great), the founder of the Achaemenid Empire." | | | |
| Triplocania galileii González-Obando, Carrejo-Gironza & García Aldrete, 2021 | Barklouse | Galileo Galilei | "This species is dedicated to Galileo di Vincenzo Bonaiuti de' Galilei, Italian physicist, astronomer, and engineer, father of observational astronomy and modern physics." | | | |
| Triplocania mancocapaci González-Obando, Carrejo-Gironza & García Aldrete, 2021 | Barklouse | Manco Cápac | This species is native to Peru, and "dedicated to Manco Cápac (Manco Inca and Ayar Manco) the first governor and founder of the Inca civilization in Cusco." | | | |
| Triplocania yupanquii González-Obando, Carrejo-Gironza & García Aldrete, 2021 | Barklouse | Topa Inca Yupanqui | This species is native to Peru, and "dedicated to Túpac Yupanqui or Túpac Inca Yupanqui, tenth head of state of the Inca Empire." | | | |
| Trismelasmos magellani Yakovlev, 2006 | Moth | Ferdinand Magellan | | | | |
| Trochammina ondegardoi † Frizzell, 1943 | Protist | Polo de Ondegardo | A fossil foraminiferan from the Cretaceous of Peru. | | | |
| Trochilus mosquera Delattre & Bourcier, 1846 | Hummingbird | Tomás Cipriano de Mosquera | Known as golden-breasted puffleg, this hummingbird native to Colombia and Ecuador was "Dedicated to General Mosquera, president of the Republic of New Granada, great protector of the sciences and natural history." Subsequently transferred to genus Eriocnemis. | | | |
| Trombiculindus kosapani Stekolnikov, 2016 | Mite | Kosa Pan | A species of chigger found on common treeshrews in Thailand, "named after Kosa Pan ("Foreign Minister Pan"), a famous Siamese diplomat and minister, head of the Second Thai embassy to France in 1686 A.D." | | | |
| Tupacsala † Petrulevičius & Gutiérrez, 2016 | Dragonfly | Túpac Amaru II and Milagro Sala | Fossil Odonatoptera from the Carboniferous of La Rioja Province, Argentina. "Dedicated to the memory of José Gabriel Condorcanqui Noguera, "Túpac" Amaru II (1738-1781) and to Milagro Amalia Ángela "Sala" (1963-). Túpac Amaru in 1780-1781 initiated a revolt against [the] Spanish State and its rules. He was tortured (forced to witness the execution of the sentences imposed on his family), executed and quartered to be exposed. Milagro Sala is a prominent Argentine social leader, Secretary of the "Organización Barrial Túpac Amaru" and Parliamentary of the Parlasur imprisoned with other members of the organization since January 16, 2016."; The type species is named Tupacsala niunamenos, "Dedicated to "Ni una menos" (Not one [woman] less), a collective against gender violence. It is a collective campaign that arose from the need to say "enough femicides", because in Argentina every 30 hours a woman is killed just [for] being a woman." | | | |
| Turbonilla (Pyrgiscus) pocahontasae Henderson & Bartsch, 1914 | Sea snail | Pocahontas | This species was described from specimens collected in Chincoteague, Virginia. | | | |
| Turbonilla (Pyrgiscus) powhatani Henderson & Bartsch, 1914 | Sea snail | Powhatan | This species was described from specimens collected in Chincoteague, Virginia. | | | |
| Turcinoemacheilus hafezi Golzarianpour, Abdoli, Patimar & Freyhof, 2013 | Fish | Hafez | A stone loach found in the Karun and Dez River drainages in Iran, "named for Khwája Shamsud-Dìn Muhammad Háfez-e Shìrázì (Persian: خواجه شمس‌‌الدین محمّد حافظ شیرازی), known by his pen name Háfez, one of the most famous and influential Persian lyric poets." | | | |
| Tutcetus † Antar et al., 2023 | Whale | Tutankhamun | A fossil genus of basilosaurids from the Eocene of Egypt, whose name is "A combination of Tut, for the ancient Egyptian Pharoah [sic] Tutankhamun, commonly known as King Tut, who unexpectedly died in his 18th year, and cetus, Greek for a whale. Genus name is used in reference to the subadult status and the diminutive size of the type specimen." | | | |
| Tychoites † Mönnig & Dietl, 2017 | Ammonite | Tycho Brahe | A subgenus of Kepplerites, "Named in matter of the Subgenotype [Kepplerites tychonis, also in this list]. Tycho Brahe (1546-1601) was a Danish astronomer." | | | |
| Ulughbegsaurus † Tanaka et al., 2021 | Dinosaur | Ulugh Beg | A carcharodontosaurian from the Cretaceous of Uzbekistan, whose name "refers to Timurid sultan Ulugh Beg, in recognition of his early scientific contributions as a fifteenth-century astronomer and mathematician in central Asia region (now Uzbekistan)" | | | |
| Unicorniella hatueyi Yong, 2019 | Katydid | Hatuey | "This species is named after Hatuey (birth date unknown, murdered by fire at stake in 1512), the well-known Taíno cacique. He was the first rebel native to America and coincidentally, he lived in the same two islands where this species occurs: Cuba and Hispaniola" | | | |
| Uromitra hypatiae Pallary, 1912 | Sea snail | Hypatia | "I dedicate this little species to the memory of the Alexandrian scholar whose erudition and tragic end deserve more than this humble tribute from a naturalist." The holotype was collected in Alexandria, Egypt. The genus Uromitra was subsequently synonymised with Vexillum. | | | |
| Uroptychus cyrano Poore & Andreakis, 2011 | Crustacean | Cyrano de Bergerac | "For Savinien de Cyrano de Bergerac (1619–1655), French soldier, satirist and playwright best remembered for his semi-autobiographic works of fiction in which he is featured with a large nose." This species belongs to the Uroptychus naso complex, distinctive for their particularly long and broad rostrum. | | | |
| Valvulineria washingtoni † McLean, 1956 | Protist | George Washington | A fossil foraminiferan from the Yorktown Formation (Miocene) of Virginia, "Named in honor of General George Washington, who won the American Revolution by accepting the surrender of the British forces in the historic York-James Peninsula." | | | |
| Vascoceras gamai † Choffat, 1898 | Ammonite | Vasco da Gama | A genus and type species from the Cretaceous of Portugal, named in commemoration of the 400th anniversary of Vasco da Gama's arrival to India. | | | |
| Venonia gabrielae Barrion & Litsinger, 1995 | Spider | Gabriela Silang | This species was described from specimens collected in the Philippines. Subsequently synonymised with Venonia micans. | | | |
| Vermitigris tsangyanggyatso Shan & Wang, 2026 | Fly | 6th Dalai Lama, Tsangyang Gyatso | "The species is dedicated to Tsangyang Gyatso (1683–1706), the 6th Dalai Lama, a Tibetan poet-monk from Xizang, renowned for his romantic verse and unconventional life." | | | |
| Wallacia † Lamont, 1978 | Trilobite | William Wallace | This genus was originally described by a Scottish scientist, from a specimen found in Scotland. | | | |
| Wamba O. Pickard-Cambridge, 1895 | Spider | Wamba | | | | |
| Warimiri zumbi Tavares, de Mello & de Mello Mendes, 2021 | Katydid | Zumbi dos Palmares | A Brazilian species named "in honor of "Zumbi dos Palmares" (1655–1695). When slavery was still legal in Brazil, "quilombos" were refuges where slaves who escaped from their owners would hide. "Quilombo dos Palmares" was the most emblematic one of the Brazilian colonial era, serving as a shelter for more than thirty thousand runaway slaves at once. Zumbi, its last leader and local hero, led the resistance against the oppression of his people imposed by the enslavers between 1678 and 1694." | | | |
| Washingtonia H.Wendl. | Palm | George Washington | | | | |
| Witica O. Pickard-Cambridge, 1895 | Spider | Wittiza | | | | |
| Wormaldia bolivari Muñoz-Quesada & Holzenthal, 2015 | Caddisfly | Simón Bolívar | A species native to Venezuela, "named in honor of the Latin American General Simón Bolivar (1783–1830), who is called "El Gran Libertador" (The Great Liberator)." | | | |
| Wormaldia tupacamara Muñoz-Quesada & Holzenthal, 2015 | Caddisfly | Túpac Amaru II | "This new species is named in honor of Túpac Amaru (José Gabriel Condorcanqui, 1740–1781, Peru) who led the Incas during many years of rebellion against the Spanish occupation in Latin America." | | | |
| Wulfila O. Pickard-Cambridge, 1895 | Spider | Wulfila | | | | |
| Xestipyge ikanti † Alekseev, 2016 | Beetle | Immanuel Kant | A fossil clown beetle from Eocene Baltic amber "devoted to the Prussian philosopher Immanuel Kant [...], who was born and lived in Königsberg, East Prussia. His contributions to metaphysics, epistemology, ethics, and aesthetics have had a profound impact on European philosophy." | | | |
| Xiphophorus montezumae Jordan & Snyder, 1899 | Fish | Moctezuma II | | | | |
| Xiphophorus montezumae cortezi Rosen, 1960 | Fish | Hernán Cortés | "The name cortezi is a historical reference to the Spanish conquistador, Hernando Cortez [sic]". Originally described as a subspecies, but subsequently promoted to species status, as Xiphophorus cortezi. | | | |
| Xiphophorus malinche Rauchenberger, Kallman & Morizot, 1990 | Fish | La Malinche | "In keeping with the allegorical use of important historical figures in the Spanish conquest of Mexico to suggest phylogenetic relationships of swordtails in the Pánuco basin, this species is named after Malinche (also called Marina or Doña Marina by the Spaniards), a linguistically gifted Indian slave who played a role in the Spanish conquest as the interpreter, secretary, and mistress of Hernando Cortes [sic]." | | | |
| Xiphophorus nezahualcoyotl Rauchenberger, Kallman & Morizot, 1990 | Fish | Nezahualcoyotl | "As the sister species of X. montezumae, we felt it appropriate to name this species for Nezahualcoyotl, the poet-philosopher emperor of Tezcoco (Texcoco), considered to be coequal with Montezuma, monarch of the Aztecs in the Aztec Triple Alliance." | | | |
| Yangavis confucii † Wang & Zhou, 2019 | Bird | Confucius | A fossil primitive bird from the Cretaceous of Liaoning, China; "The specific name is derived from Confucius, intended to show its close affinity with other confuciusornithids." | | | |
| Zamenhofella voltai Girault, 1941 | Wasp | Alessandro Volta | Subsequently transferred to the genus Austroencyrtus. | | | |
| Zanabazar † Norell et al., 2009 | Dinosaur | Zanabazar | A troodontid from the Cretaceous of Mongolia. | | | |
| Zelenkaia Hyliš, Oborník, Nebesářová & Vávra (2013) | Fungus | Jan Dismas Zelenka | A genus of parasitic microsporidia found in European caddisflies, described by Czech scientists. | | | |
| Zenobia D.Don | Flowering plant | Zenobia | The genus of the flowers known as honeycups is named after "Zenobia, queen of Palmyra, most illustrious for her virtue, learning, and misfortunes." | | | |
| Zhanghenglong † Xing et al., 2014 | Dinosaur | Zhang Heng | A hadrosauroid from the Cretaceous of China. ""Zhangheng" is derived from the full name of Mr. Zhang Heng, a famous Chinese astronomer, mathematician, inventor, poet, and statesman who lived during the Eastern Han dynasty (AD 25–220) of China. The figure was born in the outskirts of Nanyang in southwestern Henan Province, quite close to the Xixia Basin [where the fossils were collected]. The word "long" is the direct transliteration of the Mandarin Chinese word that means dragon." | | | |
| Zygaena afghana jamii Hofmann, 2017 | Moth | Jami | "Nur ad-Din Abdur Rahman Jami (1414–1492), Persian poet and mystic who lived for a long time in Samarkand and western Afghanistan and was buried in Herat." (the type locality) | | | |
| Zygaena naumanni dariushi Hofmann, 2017 | Moth | Darius the Great | "The type locality is located not far from the famous rock relief of Bihustun. Here Darius I (Old Persian Dārayavaush, New Persian Dariush) immortalized his deeds and royal legitimacy." | | | |
| Zygonyx ranavalonae Fraser, 1949 | Dragonfly | Ranavalona I | This species is native to Madagascar. | | | |

== See also ==
- List of bacterial genera named after personal names
- List of rose cultivars named after people
- List of taxa named by anagrams
- List of organisms named after the Harry Potter series
