= List of Campiglossa species =

This is a list of 195 species in Campiglossa, a genus of fruit flies in the family Tephritidae.

== Campiglossa species ==
- Campiglossa absinthii (Fabricius, 1805)
- Campiglossa achyrophori (Loew, 1869)
- Campiglossa aeneostriata (Munro, 1935)
- Campiglossa aesia (Walker, 1849)
- Campiglossa agatha (Hering, 1956)
- Campiglossa albiceps (Loew, 1873)
- Campiglossa aliniana (Hering, 1937)
- Campiglossa amurensis Hendel, 1927
- Campiglossa anchorata (Munro, 1957)
- Campiglossa angustipennis (Malloch, 1938)
- Campiglossa anomalina (Bezzi, 1924)
- Campiglossa aragonensis (Hering, 1934)
- Campiglossa argentata (Munro, 1957)
- Campiglossa argyrocephala (Loew, 1844)
- Campiglossa astuta (Munro, 1957)
- Campiglossa basalis (Chen, 1938)
- Campiglossa basifasciata (Hering, 1941)
- Campiglossa berlandi Séguy, 1932
- Campiglossa bigutta (Hering, 1941)
- Campiglossa binotata (Wang, 1990)
- Campiglossa biplagiata (Hering, 1934)
- Campiglossa brunalata (Munro, 1957)
- Campiglossa brunneimacula (Hardy, 1988)
- Campiglossa cain (Hering, 1937)
- Campiglossa californica (Novak, 1974)
- Campiglossa cassara (Walker, 1849)
- Campiglossa cicerbitae (Hering, 1951)
- Campiglossa cisnupchuna Ito, 2011
- Campiglossa clathrata (Loew, 1862)
- Campiglossa coei (Hardy, 1964)
- Campiglossa coloradensis (Quisenberry, 1949)
- Campiglossa communis (Chen, 1938)
- Campiglossa compta (Munro, 1957)
- Campiglossa confinis (Chen, 1938)
- Campiglossa conspersa (Wulp, 1900)
- Campiglossa contingens (Becker, 1908)
- Campiglossa cribellata Bezzi, 1913
- Campiglossa defasciata (Hering, 1936)
- Campiglossa deserta (Hering, 1939)
- Campiglossa despecta (Wulp, 1900)
- Campiglossa difficilis (Hendel, 1927)
- Campiglossa dirlbekorum Norrbom, 1999
- Campiglossa distichera (Wang, 1990)
- Campiglossa distincta (Quisenberry, 1949)
- Campiglossa dorema (Hering, 1941)
- Campiglossa doronici (Loew, 1856)
- Campiglossa dreisbachorum (Novak, 1974)
- Campiglossa dupla (Cresson, 1907)
- Campiglossa duplex (Becker, 1908)
- Campiglossa edwardsi (Munro, 1957)
- Campiglossa eflorata (Munro, 1957)
- Campiglossa enigma (Hering, 1941)
- Campiglossa exigua (Chen, 1938)
- Campiglossa extincta (Hering, 1944)
- Campiglossa farinata (Novak, 1974)
- Campiglossa favillacea Ito, 2011
- Campiglossa femorata Wang, 1996
- Campiglossa fenestrata (Munro, 1957)
- Campiglossa festiva (Chen, 1938)
- Campiglossa fibulata (Wulp, 1900)
- Campiglossa flavescens (Chen, 1938)
- Campiglossa floccosa (Curran, 1928)
- Campiglossa footei Thompson, 1999
- Campiglossa footeorum (Novak, 1974)
- Campiglossa fouica (Hering, 1951)
- Campiglossa freidbergi Merz, 2000
- Campiglossa freyae (Lindner, 1928)
- Campiglossa frolica (Dirlbek & Dirlbekova, 1974)
- Campiglossa fuscata (Macquart, 1851)
- Campiglossa gansuica (Chen, 1938)
- Campiglossa gemma (Hering, 1939)
- Campiglossa genalis (Thomson, 1869)
- Campiglossa gilversa (Wang, 1990)
- Campiglossa grandinata (Rondani, 1870)
- Campiglossa granulata (Munro, 1957)
- Campiglossa guttata (Wiedemann, 1830)
- Campiglossa guttella (Rondani, 1870)
- Campiglossa guttularis (Wulp, 1900)
- Campiglossa helveola (Ito, 1984)
- Campiglossa hirayamae (Matsumura, 1916)
- Campiglossa hofferi (Dirlbek & Dirlbekova, 1976)
- Campiglossa hyalina (Foote, 1979)
- Campiglossa ignobilis (Loew, 1861)
- Campiglossa igori Korneyev, 1990
- Campiglossa intermedia (Zia, 1937)
- Campiglossa iracunda (Hering, 1938)
- Campiglossa iriomotensis (Shiraki, 1968)
- Campiglossa irrorata (Fallén, 1814)
- Campiglossa jamesi (Novak, 1974)
- Campiglossa japonica (Ito, 1984)
- Campiglossa jugosa (Ito, 1984)
- Campiglossa kanabaina (Munro, 1957)
- Campiglossa kangdingensis Wang, 1996
- Campiglossa kaszabi Korneyev, 1990
- Campiglossa kumaonesis Agarwal, Grewal et al., 1989
- Campiglossa lhommei (Hering, 1936)
- Campiglossa lingens (Loew, 1869)
- Campiglossa loewiana (Hendel, 1927)
- Campiglossa longicauda Wang, 1996
- Campiglossa longistigma (Wang, 1990)
- Campiglossa lubrica (Dirlbek & Dirlbek, 1971)
- Campiglossa luculenta (Wulp, 1900)
- Campiglossa luxorientis (Hering, 1940)
- Campiglossa lyncea (Bezzi, 1913)
- Campiglossa magniceps (Hendel, 1927)
- Campiglossa malaris (Séguy, 1934)
- Campiglossa lingens (Loew, 1869)
- Campiglossa martii (Becker, 1908)
- Campiglossa matsumotoi (Shiraki, 1968)
- Campiglossa media (Malloch, 1938)
- Campiglossa medora (Hering, 1936)
- Campiglossa melaena (Hering, 1941)
- Campiglossa menyuanana Wang, 1996
- Campiglossa messalina (Hering, 1937)
- Campiglossa misella (Loew, 1869)
- Campiglossa mitrata (Munro, 1957)
- Campiglossa montana Korneyev, 1990
- Campiglossa multimaculosa (Dirlbek & Dirlbek, 1969)
- Campiglossa munroi (Hering, 1937)
- Campiglossa murina (Doane, 1899)
- Campiglossa nacta (Munro, 1957)
- Campiglossa nigricauda (Chen, 1938)
- Campiglossa nigrilonga (Dirlbek & Dirlbekova, 1972)
- Campiglossa obscuripennis (Loew, 1850)
- Campiglossa obsoleta (Wulp, 1900)
- Campiglossa occidentalis (Novak, 1974)
- Campiglossa occultella (Chen, 1938)
- Campiglossa ochracea (Hendel, 1927)
- Campiglossa opacipennis (Foote, 1960)
- Campiglossa ophelia (Hering, 1944)
- Campiglossa ornalibera (Wang, 1990)
- Campiglossa pallidipennis (Cresson, 1907)
- Campiglossa paula (Hering, 1941)
- Campiglossa peringueyi (Bezzi, 1924)
- Campiglossa perspicillata Bezzi, 1918
- Campiglossa petulans (Munro, 1957)
- Campiglossa philippinensis (Hardy, 1974)
- Campiglossa plantaginis (Haliday, 1833)
- Campiglossa producta (Loew, 1844)
- Campiglossa propria (Chen, 1938)
- Campiglossa pseudodiluta Korneyev, 1990
- Campiglossa punctata (Shiraki, 1933)
- Campiglossa punctella (Fallén, 1814)
- Campiglossa pusilla (Chen, 1938)
- Campiglossa putrida (Hering, 1941)
- Campiglossa pygmaea (Novak, 1974)
- Campiglossa qinquemaculata Wang, 1996
- Campiglossa quadriguttata (Hendel, 1927)
- Campiglossa quelpartensis (Kwon, 1985)
- Campiglossa reticulata (Becker, 1908)
- Campiglossa roscida Ito, 2011
- Campiglossa rufula (Chen, 1938)
- Campiglossa sabroskyi (Novak, 1974)
- Campiglossa sada (Dirlbek & Dirlbekova, 1974)
- Campiglossa salina (Munro, 1951)
- Campiglossa saltoria (Munro, 1951)
- Campiglossa scedelloides Korneyev, 1990
- Campiglossa separabilis (Hering, 1941)
- Campiglossa shensiana (Chen, 1938)
- Campiglossa shiraensis (Munro, 1951)
- Campiglossa siamensis (Hardy, 1973)
- Campiglossa sigillata (Munro, 1957)
- Campiglossa simplex (Chen, 1938)
- Campiglossa sinensis Chen, 1938
- Campiglossa siphonina (Bezzi, 1918)
- Campiglossa snowi (Hering, 1944)
- Campiglossa solidaginis (White, 1986)
- Campiglossa spenceri (Hardy, 1973)
- Campiglossa spinata (Munro, 1957)
- Campiglossa stenoptera (Loew, 1862)
- Campiglossa steyskali (Novak, 1974)
- Campiglossa stigmosa (Meijere, 1916)
- Campiglossa subochracea (Séguy, 1934)
- Campiglossa suboculata (Séguy, 1939)
- Campiglossa taenipennis (Hering, 1941)
- Campiglossa tamerlan (Hering, 1938)
- Campiglossa tenebrosa (Coquillett, 1899)
- Campiglossa tessellata (Loew, 1844)
- Campiglossa tolli (Hering, 1937)
- Campiglossa transversa Hardy & Drew, 1996
- Campiglossa trassaerti (Chen, 1938)
- Campiglossa trinotata (Foote, 1979)
- Campiglossa trochlina Wang, 1990
- Campiglossa turneri Hardy & Drew, 1996
- Campiglossa umbrata (Cresson, 1907)
- Campiglossa umbritica (Munro, 1957)
- Campiglossa undata (Chen, 1938)
- Campiglossa varia (Chen, 1938)
- Campiglossa variabilis (Doane, 1899)
- Campiglossa venezolensis (Hering, 1939)
- Campiglossa venusta Dirlbek & Dirlbekova, 1971
- Campiglossa virgata (Hering, 1940)
- Campiglossa whitei Hardy & Drew, 1996
- Campiglossa wolongensis Wang, 1996
- Campiglossa zavattarii (Séguy, 1939)
