= Campiglossa luxorientis =

Scientific classification
- Kingdom: Animalia
- Phylum: Arthropoda
- Clade: Pancrustacea
- Class: Insecta
- Order: Diptera
- Family: Tephritidae
- Subfamily: Tephritinae
- Tribe: Tephritini
- Genus: Campiglossa
- Species: C. luxorientis

Binomial name
- Campiglossa luxorientis (Hering, 1940)

Synonyms
- Paroxyna luxorientis Hering, 1940; Paroxyna melanochroa Hering, 1941; Paroxyna oxynoides Hering, 1936

Species of fly

Campiglossa luxorientis is a species of tephritid or fruit flies in the genus Campiglossa of the family Tephritidae.

== Distribution ==
The species is found in Mongolia, China, Russia.
