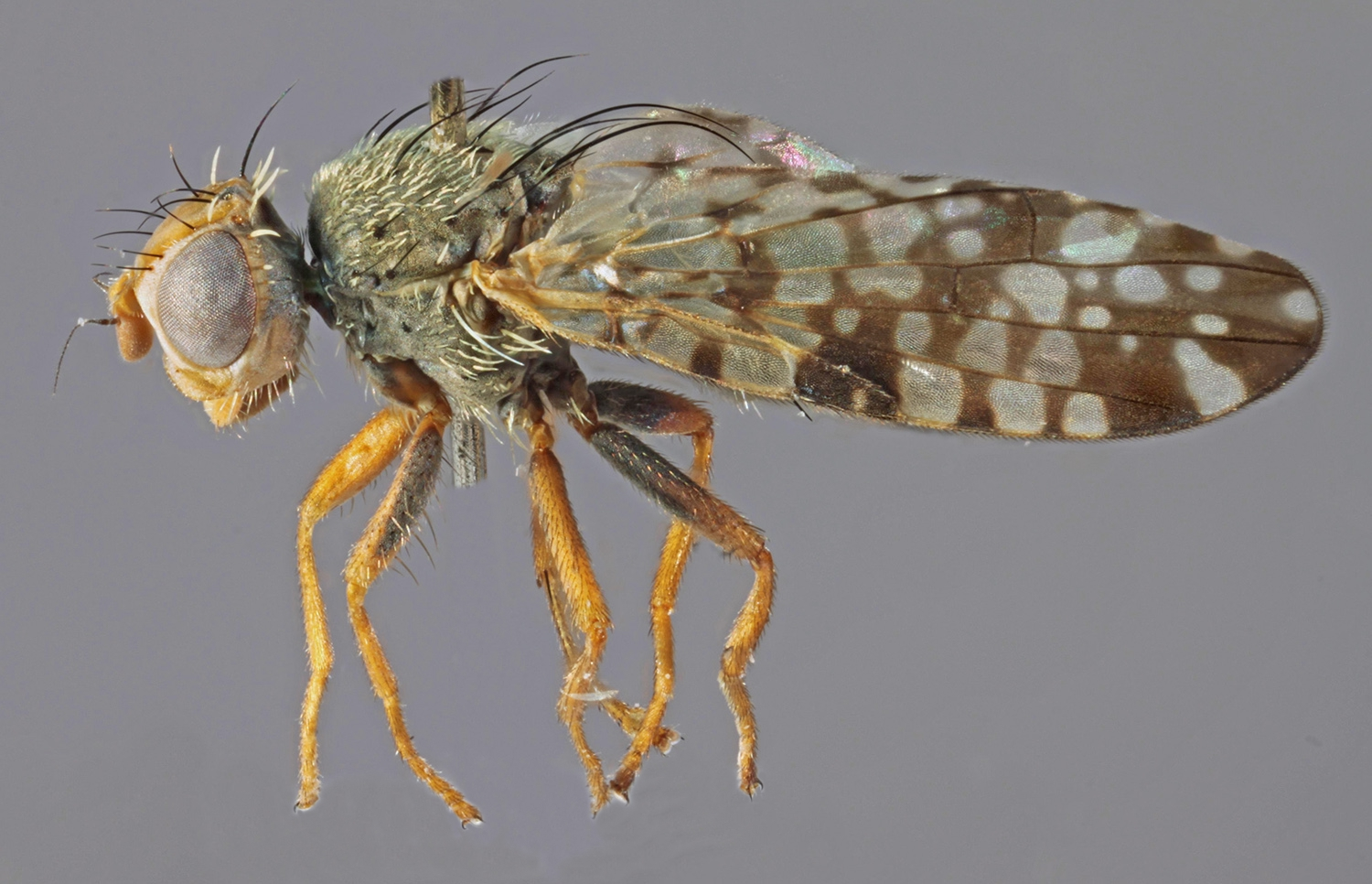
- Campiglossa loewiana North Wales

Scientific classification
- Kingdom: Animalia
- Phylum: Arthropoda
- Clade: Pancrustacea
- Class: Insecta
- Order: Diptera
- Family: Tephritidae
- Subfamily: Tephritinae
- Tribe: Tephritini
- Genus: Campiglossa
- Species: C. loewiana

Binomial name
- Campiglossa loewiana Hendel, 1927

Synonyms
- Paroxyna loewiana Hendel, 1927; Tephritis theora Newman, 1833

= Campiglossa loewiana =

Species of fly

Campiglossa loewiana is a species of fly in the family Tephritidae, the gall flies. The species is found in the Palearctic. The body is black brown; the upper part of pleuras and the midline of the scutellum dirty yellow. Femora 1 and III more or less browned.Oviscapte is a shiny black.Long. : 3–4 mm. The larvae feed in flower heads of Solidago virgaurea and Aster amellus.
