= Campiglossa multimaculosa =

Scientific classification
- Kingdom: Animalia
- Phylum: Arthropoda
- Clade: Pancrustacea
- Class: Insecta
- Order: Diptera
- Family: Tephritidae
- Subfamily: Tephritinae
- Tribe: Tephritini
- Genus: Campiglossa
- Species: C. multimaculosa

Binomial name
- Campiglossa multimaculosa (Dirlbek & Dirlbek, 1968)

Synonyms
- Paroxyna reticulata ssp. multimaculosa Dirlbek & Dirlbekova, 1968

Species of fly

Campiglossa multimaculosa is a species of tephritid or fruit flies in the genus Campiglossa of the family Tephritidae.

== Distribution ==
The species is found in the Canary Islands.
