= Campiglossa albiceps =

Scientific classification
- Kingdom: Animalia
- Phylum: Arthropoda
- Clade: Pancrustacea
- Class: Insecta
- Order: Diptera
- Family: Tephritidae
- Tribe: Tephritini
- Genus: Campiglossa
- Species: C. albiceps

Binomial name
- Campiglossa albiceps (Loew, 1873)

Synonyms
- Trypeta albiceps Loew, 1873; Trypeta euryptera Loew, 1873; Trypeta duplex Foote, 1964

Species of fly

Campiglossa albiceps is a species of fruit fly in the family Tephritidae.
