= Campiglossa varia =

Scientific classification
- Kingdom: Animalia
- Phylum: Arthropoda
- Clade: Pancrustacea
- Class: Insecta
- Order: Diptera
- Family: Tephritidae
- Subfamily: Tephritinae
- Tribe: Tephritini
- Genus: Campiglossa
- Species: C. varia

Binomial name
- Campiglossa varia (Chen, 1938)

Synonyms
- Paroxyna varia Chen, 1938

Species of fly

Campiglossa varia is a species of tephritid or fruit flies in the genus Campiglossa of the family Tephritidae. It is found in northern China.
