= Campiglossa anomalina =

Scientific classification
- Kingdom: Animalia
- Phylum: Arthropoda
- Clade: Pancrustacea
- Class: Insecta
- Order: Diptera
- Family: Tephritidae
- Subfamily: Tephritinae
- Tribe: Tephritini
- Genus: Campiglossa
- Species: C. anomalina

Binomial name
- Campiglossa anomalina (Bezzi, 1924)

Synonyms
- Spathulina anomalina Bezzi, 1924; Paroxyna munroi f. apiceguttata Hering, 1941

Species of fly

Campiglossa anomalina is a species of tephritid or fruit flies in the genus Campiglossa of the family Tephritidae.

== Distribution ==
The species is found in Ethiopia, Burundi, Tanzania, Lesotho, South Africa.
