= Campiglossa doronici =

Scientific classification
- Kingdom: Animalia
- Phylum: Arthropoda
- Clade: Pancrustacea
- Class: Insecta
- Order: Diptera
- Family: Tephritidae
- Subfamily: Tephritinae
- Tribe: Tephritini
- Genus: Campiglossa
- Species: C. doronici

Binomial name
- Campiglossa doronici (Loew, 1856)

Synonyms
- Trypeta doronici Loew, 1856

Species of fly

Campiglossa doronici is a species of tephritid or fruit flies in the genus Campiglossa of the family Tephritidae.

== Distribution ==
The species is found in Poland, Austria, the Czech Republic, Romania, Ukraine.
