= Campiglossa spenceri =

Scientific classification
- Kingdom: Animalia
- Phylum: Arthropoda
- Clade: Pancrustacea
- Class: Insecta
- Order: Diptera
- Family: Tephritidae
- Subfamily: Tephritinae
- Tribe: Tephritini
- Genus: Campiglossa
- Species: C. spenceri

Binomial name
- Campiglossa spenceri (Hardy, 1973)

Synonyms
- Stylia spenceri Hardy, 1973

Species of fly

Campiglossa spenceri is a species of fruit fly in the family Tephritidae. It measures 3.0 mm (0.12 in) in body length.

== Distribution ==
The species is found in Vietnam.
