= Campiglossa achyrophori =

Scientific classification
- Kingdom: Animalia
- Phylum: Arthropoda
- Clade: Pancrustacea
- Class: Insecta
- Order: Diptera
- Family: Tephritidae
- Subfamily: Tephritinae
- Tribe: Tephritini
- Genus: Campiglossa
- Species: C. achyrophori

Binomial name
- Campiglossa achyrophori (Loew, 1869)

Synonyms
- Oxyna achyrophori Loew, 1869; Paroxyna archyrophori Foote, 1984

Species of fly

Campiglossa achyrophori is a species of tephritid or fruit flies in the genus Campiglossa of the family Tephritidae.

== Distribution ==
The species is found in Sri Lanka, Taiwan.
