= Campiglossa aeneostriata =

Scientific classification
- Kingdom: Animalia
- Phylum: Arthropoda
- Clade: Pancrustacea
- Class: Insecta
- Order: Diptera
- Family: Tephritidae
- Subfamily: Tephritinae
- Tribe: Tephritini
- Genus: Campiglossa
- Species: C. aeneostriata

Binomial name
- Campiglossa aeneostriata (Munro, 1935)

Synonyms
- Paroxyna aeneostriata Munro, 1935

Species of fly

Campiglossa aeneostriata is a species of tephritid or fruit flies in the genus Campiglossa of the family Tephritidae.

== Distribution ==
The species is found in Sri Lanka, Taiwan.
