= Campiglossa contingens =

Scientific classification
- Kingdom: Animalia
- Phylum: Arthropoda
- Clade: Pancrustacea
- Class: Insecta
- Order: Diptera
- Family: Tephritidae
- Subfamily: Tephritinae
- Tribe: Tephritini
- Genus: Campiglossa
- Species: C. contingens

Binomial name
- Campiglossa contingens (Becker, 1908)

Synonyms
- Oxyna contingens Becker, 1908; Oxyna evanescens Becker, 1908; Paroxyna lederi Hendel, 1927

Species of fly

Campiglossa contingens is a species of tephritid or fruit flies in the genus Campiglossa of the family Tephritidae.

== Distribution ==
The species is found in Mongolia, China.
