= Campiglossa genalis =

Scientific classification
- Kingdom: Animalia
- Phylum: Arthropoda
- Clade: Pancrustacea
- Class: Insecta
- Order: Diptera
- Family: Tephritidae
- Tribe: Tephritini
- Genus: Campiglossa
- Species: C. genalis

Binomial name
- Campiglossa genalis (Thomson, 1869)

Synonyms
- Paroxyna americana Hering, 1944; Paroxyna difficilis subsp. americana Hering, 1947; Paroxyna franciscana Cresson, 1907; Tephritis corpulenta Thomson, 1869; Trypeta genalis Hering, 1944

Species of fly

Campiglossa genalis is a species of fruit fly in the family Tephritidae.
