= Campiglossa quadriguttata =

Scientific classification
- Kingdom: Animalia
- Phylum: Arthropoda
- Clade: Pancrustacea
- Class: Insecta
- Order: Diptera
- Family: Tephritidae
- Subfamily: Tephritinae
- Tribe: Tephritini
- Genus: Campiglossa
- Species: C. quadriguttata

Binomial name
- Campiglossa quadriguttata (Hendel, 1927)

Synonyms
- Paroxyna quadriguttata Hendel, 1927; Aliniana aliena Hering, 1951; Gonioxyna conopea Dirlbek & Dirlbekova, 1972

Species of fly

Campiglossa quadriguttata is a species of tephritid or fruit flies in the genus Campiglossa of the family Tephritidae.

== Distribution ==
The species is found in Mongolia, East of Russia.
