= Campiglossa tessellata =

Scientific classification
- Kingdom: Animalia
- Phylum: Arthropoda
- Clade: Pancrustacea
- Class: Insecta
- Order: Diptera
- Family: Tephritidae
- Subfamily: Tephritinae
- Tribe: Tephritini
- Genus: Campiglossa
- Species: C. tessellata

Binomial name
- Campiglossa tessellata (Loew, 1844)

Synonyms
- Trypeta tessellata Loew, 1844

Species of fly

Campiglossa tessellata is a species of tephritid or fruit flies in the genus Campiglossa of the family Tephritidae.

== Distribution ==
The species is found in Central Europe, Southern Russia, Caucasus, Afghanistan, China.
