= Campiglossa salina =

Scientific classification
- Kingdom: Animalia
- Phylum: Arthropoda
- Clade: Pancrustacea
- Class: Insecta
- Order: Diptera
- Family: Tephritidae
- Subfamily: Tephritinae
- Tribe: Tephritini
- Genus: Campiglossa
- Species: C. salina

Binomial name
- Campiglossa salina (Munro, 1951)

Synonyms
- Paroxyna salina Munro, 1951

Species of fly

Campiglossa salina is a species of fruit fly in the family Tephritidae.

== Distribution ==
The species is found in Kenya, Tanzania.
