= Campiglossa eflorata =

Scientific classification
- Kingdom: Animalia
- Phylum: Arthropoda
- Clade: Pancrustacea
- Class: Insecta
- Order: Diptera
- Family: Tephritidae
- Subfamily: Tephritinae
- Tribe: Tephritini
- Genus: Campiglossa
- Species: C. eflorata

Binomial name
- Campiglossa eflorata (Munro, 1957)

Synonyms
- Paroxyna eflorata Munro, 1957

Species of fly

Campiglossa eflorata is a species of tephritid or fruit flies in the genus Campiglossa of the family Tephritidae.

== Distribution ==
The species is found in Kenya.
