= Campiglossa occidentalis =

Scientific classification
- Kingdom: Animalia
- Phylum: Arthropoda
- Clade: Pancrustacea
- Class: Insecta
- Order: Diptera
- Family: Tephritidae
- Subfamily: Tephritinae
- Tribe: Tephritini
- Genus: Campiglossa
- Species: C. occidentalis

Binomial name
- Campiglossa occidentalis (Novak, 1974)

Synonyms
- Paroxyna occidentalis Novak, 1974

Species of fly

Campiglossa occidentalis is a species of tephritid or fruit flies in the genus Campiglossa of the family Tephritidae.

== Distribution ==
The species is found in Canada, the United States.
