= Campiglossa punctella =

Scientific classification
- Kingdom: Animalia
- Phylum: Arthropoda
- Clade: Pancrustacea
- Class: Insecta
- Order: Diptera
- Family: Tephritidae
- Subfamily: Tephritinae
- Tribe: Tephritini
- Genus: Campiglossa
- Species: C. punctella

Binomial name
- Campiglossa punctella (Fallén, 1814)

Synonyms
- Tephritis punctella Fallén, 1814

Species of fly

Campiglossa punctella is a species of tephritid or fruit flies in the genus Campiglossa of the family Tephritidae.

== Distribution ==
Scandinavia, Germany, Switzerland, Ukraine.
