= Campiglossa reticulata =

Scientific classification
- Kingdom: Animalia
- Phylum: Arthropoda
- Clade: Pancrustacea
- Class: Insecta
- Order: Diptera
- Family: Tephritidae
- Subfamily: Tephritinae
- Tribe: Tephritini
- Genus: Campiglossa
- Species: C. reticulata

Binomial name
- Campiglossa reticulata (Becker, 1908)

Synonyms
- Tephritis reticulata Becker, 1908; Tephritis occulta Becker, 1908; Acinia insularis Wollaston, 1858

Species of fly

Campiglossa reticulata is a species of tephritid or fruit flies in the genus Campiglossa of the family Tephritidae.

== Distribution ==
The species is found in Madeira, the Canary Islands.
