= Campiglossa suboculata =

Scientific classification
- Kingdom: Animalia
- Phylum: Arthropoda
- Clade: Pancrustacea
- Class: Insecta
- Order: Diptera
- Family: Tephritidae
- Subfamily: Tephritinae
- Tribe: Tephritini
- Genus: Campiglossa
- Species: C. suboculata

Binomial name
- Campiglossa suboculata (Séguy, 1939)

Synonyms
- Paroxyna suboculata Séguy, 1939

Species of fly

Campiglossa suboculata is a species of fruit fly in the family Tephritidae.

== Distribution ==
The species is found in Ethiopia.
