= Campiglossa siphonina =

Scientific classification
- Kingdom: Animalia
- Phylum: Arthropoda
- Clade: Pancrustacea
- Class: Insecta
- Order: Diptera
- Family: Tephritidae
- Subfamily: Tephritinae
- Tribe: Tephritini
- Genus: Campiglossa
- Species: C. siphonina

Binomial name
- Campiglossa siphonina (Bezzi, 1918)

Synonyms
- Ensina siphonina Bezzi, 1918

Species of fly

Campiglossa siphonina is a species of tephritid or fruit flies in the genus Campiglossa of the family Tephritidae.

== Distribution ==
The species is found in Ethiopia, Uganda, Kenya, Tanzania, Zimbabwe, South Africa.
