= Campiglossa stigmosa =

Scientific classification
- Kingdom: Animalia
- Phylum: Arthropoda
- Clade: Pancrustacea
- Class: Insecta
- Order: Diptera
- Family: Tephritidae
- Subfamily: Tephritinae
- Tribe: Tephritini
- Genus: Campiglossa
- Species: C. stigmosa

Binomial name
- Campiglossa stigmosa (Meijere, 1916)

Synonyms
- Tephritis stigmosa Meijere, 1916; Paroxyna timorensis Hering, 1940

Species of fly

Campiglossa stigmosa is a species of fruit fly in the family Tephritidae.

== Distribution ==
The species is found in Indonesia, Papua New Guinea.
