= Campiglossa hirayamae =

Scientific classification
- Kingdom: Animalia
- Phylum: Arthropoda
- Clade: Pancrustacea
- Class: Insecta
- Order: Diptera
- Family: Tephritidae
- Subfamily: Tephritinae
- Tribe: Tephritini
- Genus: Campiglossa
- Species: C. hirayamae

Binomial name
- Campiglossa hirayamae (Matsumura, 1916)

Synonyms
- Tephritis hirayamae Matsumura, 1916; Campiglossa hensanica Zia, 1939; Campiglossa conformis Zia, 1937; Campiglossa hyrayamae Hendel, 1927

Species of fly

Campiglossa hirayamae is a species of tephritid or fruit flies in the genus Campiglossa of the family Tephritidae.

== Distribution ==
The species is found in Russia, Mongolia, China, Korea, Japan, Taiwan.
