= Campiglossa argyrocephala =

Scientific classification
- Kingdom: Animalia
- Phylum: Arthropoda
- Clade: Pancrustacea
- Class: Insecta
- Order: Diptera
- Family: Tephritidae
- Subfamily: Tephritinae
- Tribe: Tephritini
- Genus: Campiglossa
- Species: C. argyrocephala

Binomial name
- Campiglossa argyrocephala (Loew, 1844)

Synonyms
- Trypeta argyrocephala Loew, 1844

Species of fly

Campiglossa argyrocephala is a species of tephritid or fruit flies in the genus Campiglossa of the family Tephritidae.

== Distribution ==
The species is found in the United Kingdom, Scandinavia, south to France, Austria, Ukraine, Kazakhstan.
