= Campiglossa longicauda =

Scientific classification
- Kingdom: Animalia
- Phylum: Arthropoda
- Clade: Pancrustacea
- Class: Insecta
- Order: Diptera
- Family: Tephritidae
- Subfamily: Tephritinae
- Tribe: Tephritini
- Genus: Campiglossa
- Species: C. longicauda

Binomial name
- Campiglossa longicauda Wang, 1996

Species of fly

Campiglossa longicauda is a species of fruit flies in the family Tephritidae and the genus Campiglossa.

== Distribution ==
The species is found in China.
