= Campiglossa deserta =

Scientific classification
- Kingdom: Animalia
- Phylum: Arthropoda
- Clade: Pancrustacea
- Class: Insecta
- Order: Diptera
- Family: Tephritidae
- Subfamily: Tephritinae
- Tribe: Tephritini
- Genus: Campiglossa
- Species: C. deserta

Binomial name
- Campiglossa deserta (Hering, 1939)

Synonyms
- Paroxyna deserta Hering, 1939

Species of fly

Campiglossa deserta is a species of tephritid or fruit flies in the genus Campiglossa of the family Tephritidae.

== Distribution ==
The species is found in China.
