= Campiglossa solidaginis =

Scientific classification
- Kingdom: Animalia
- Phylum: Arthropoda
- Clade: Pancrustacea
- Class: Insecta
- Order: Diptera
- Family: Tephritidae
- Subfamily: Tephritinae
- Tribe: Tephritini
- Genus: Campiglossa
- Species: C. solidaginis

Binomial name
- Campiglossa solidaginis (White, 1986)

Synonyms
- Paroxyna solidaginis White, 1986

Species of fly

Campiglossa solidaginis is a species of fruit fly in the family Tephritidae.

== Distribution ==
The species is found in England, Norway, Sweden, Switzerland, Serbia.
