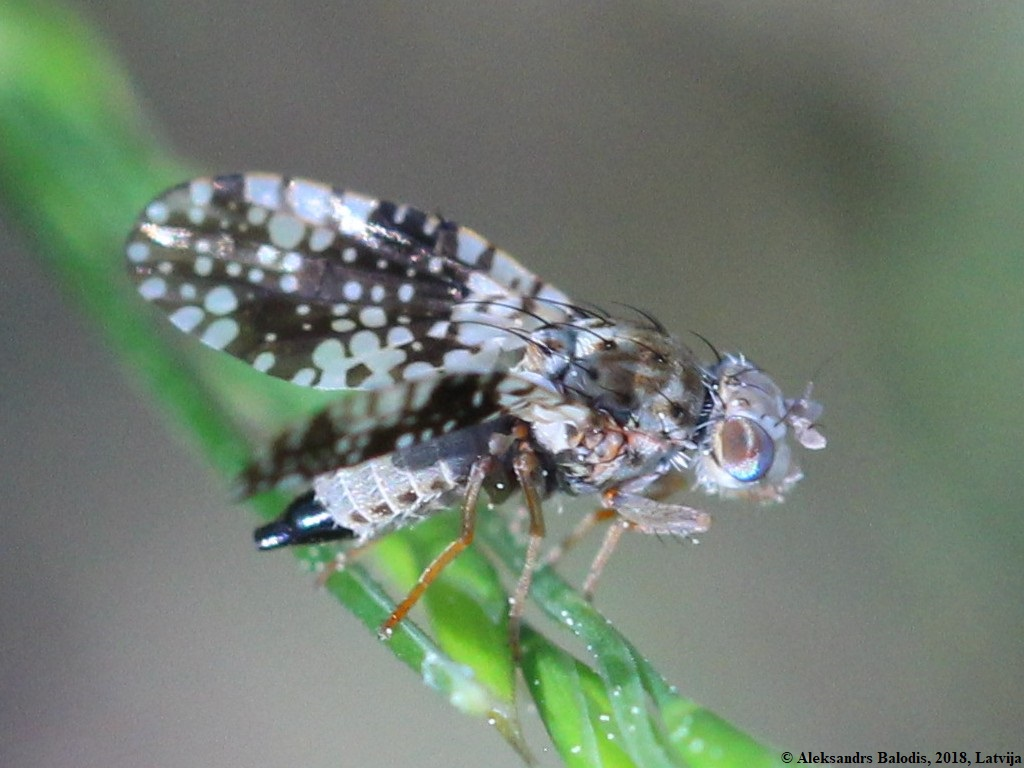

Scientific classification
- Kingdom: Animalia
- Phylum: Arthropoda
- Clade: Pancrustacea
- Class: Insecta
- Order: Diptera
- Family: Tephritidae
- Subfamily: Tephritinae
- Tribe: Tephritini
- Genus: Campiglossa
- Species: C. grandinata

Binomial name
- Campiglossa grandinata (Rondani, 1870)

Synonyms
- Oxyna grandinata Rondani, 1870; Oxyna borealis Portschinsky, 1875; Campiglossa effigenda Korneyev, 1990; Campiglossa effingenda Dirlbek & Dirlbek, 1971; Tephritis beckeri Rübsaamen, 1910

= Campiglossa grandinata =

Species of fly

Campiglossa grandinata is a species of tephritid, fruit flies in the family Tephritidae.

== Distribution ==
The species is found in North and Central Europe, North and Central Russia, Kazakhstan, Mongolia.
