= Campiglossa guttella =

Scientific classification
- Kingdom: Animalia
- Phylum: Arthropoda
- Clade: Pancrustacea
- Class: Insecta
- Order: Diptera
- Family: Tephritidae
- Subfamily: Tephritinae
- Tribe: Tephritini
- Genus: Campiglossa
- Species: C. guttella

Binomial name
- Campiglossa guttella (Rondani, 1870)

Synonyms
- Oxyna guttella Rondani, 1870

Species of fly

Campiglossa guttella is a species of tephritid or fruit flies in the genus Campiglossa of the family Tephritidae.

== Distribution ==
The species is found in Norway, France, Switzerland, Austria, Italy, Bulgaria, Ukraine.
