= Campiglossa variabilis =

Scientific classification
- Kingdom: Animalia
- Phylum: Arthropoda
- Clade: Pancrustacea
- Class: Insecta
- Order: Diptera
- Family: Tephritidae
- Subfamily: Tephritinae
- Tribe: Tephritini
- Genus: Campiglossa
- Species: C. variabilis

Binomial name
- Campiglossa variabilis (Doane, 1899)

Synonyms
- Tephritis variabilis Doane, 1899

Species of fly

Campiglossa variabilis is a species of fruit fly in the family Tephritidae.

== Distribution ==
The species found in British Columbia, Montana, South to California, Colorado.
