= Campiglossa trinotata =

Scientific classification
- Kingdom: Animalia
- Phylum: Arthropoda
- Clade: Pancrustacea
- Class: Insecta
- Order: Diptera
- Family: Tephritidae
- Subfamily: Tephritinae
- Tribe: Tephritini
- Genus: Campiglossa
- Species: C. trinotata

Binomial name
- Campiglossa trinotata (Foote, 1979)

Synonyms
- Gonioxyna trinotata Foote, 1979

Species of fly

Campiglossa trinotata is a species of tephritid or fruit flies in the genus Campiglossa of the family Tephritidae.

== Distribution ==
The species is found in Guatemala.
