= Campiglossa stenoptera =

Scientific classification
- Kingdom: Animalia
- Phylum: Arthropoda
- Clade: Pancrustacea
- Class: Insecta
- Order: Diptera
- Family: Tephritidae
- Subfamily: Tephritinae
- Tribe: Tephritini
- Genus: Campiglossa
- Species: C. stenoptera

Binomial name
- Campiglossa stenoptera (Loew, 1862)

Synonyms
- Oxyna stenoptera Loew, 1862

Species of fly

Campiglossa stenoptera is a species of fruit fly in the family Tephritidae.

== Distribution ==
The species is found in Italy.
