= Campiglossa murina =

Scientific classification
- Kingdom: Animalia
- Phylum: Arthropoda
- Clade: Pancrustacea
- Class: Insecta
- Order: Diptera
- Family: Tephritidae
- Tribe: Tephritini
- Genus: Campiglossa
- Species: C. murina

Binomial name
- Campiglossa murina (Doane, 1899)

Synonyms
- Tephritis murina Doane, 1899; Paroxyna maculifemorata Hering, 1947

Species of fly

Campiglossa murina is a species of fruit fly in the family Tephritidae.

== Distribution ==
The species is found in Alaska, Yukon, the Northwest Territories, South to California, New Mexico.
