= Campiglossa hofferi =

Scientific classification
- Kingdom: Animalia
- Phylum: Arthropoda
- Clade: Pancrustacea
- Class: Insecta
- Order: Diptera
- Family: Tephritidae
- Subfamily: Tephritinae
- Tribe: Tephritini
- Genus: Campiglossa
- Species: C. hofferi

Binomial name
- Campiglossa hofferi (Dirlbek & Dirlbekova, 1976)

Synonyms
- Paroxyna hofferi Dirlbek & Dirlbekova, 1976

Species of fly

Campiglossa hofferi is a species of tephritid or fruit flies in the genus Campiglossa of the family Tephritidae.

== Distribution ==
Algeria.
