= Campiglossa siamensis =

Scientific classification
- Kingdom: Animalia
- Phylum: Arthropoda
- Clade: Pancrustacea
- Class: Insecta
- Order: Diptera
- Family: Tephritidae
- Subfamily: Tephritinae
- Tribe: Tephritini
- Genus: Campiglossa
- Species: C. siamensis

Binomial name
- Campiglossa siamensis (Hardy, 1973)

Synonyms
- Stylia siamensis Hardy, 1973

Species of fly

Campiglossa siamensis is a species of fruit fly in the family Tephritidae. It measures 4.0 mm (0.16 in) in total length.

== Distribution ==
The species is found in Thailand.
