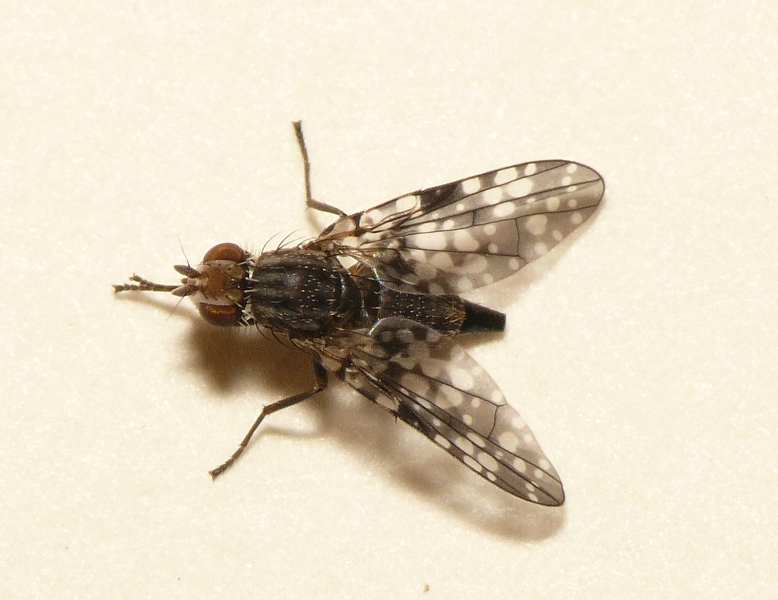

Scientific classification
- Kingdom: Animalia
- Phylum: Arthropoda
- Clade: Pancrustacea
- Class: Insecta
- Order: Diptera
- Family: Tephritidae
- Tribe: Tephritini
- Genus: Campiglossa
- Species: C. misella

Binomial name
- Campiglossa misella (Loew, 1869)

Synonyms
- Oxyna misella Loew, 1869; Tephritis lusoria Nowicki, 1869

= Campiglossa misella =

Species of fly

Campiglossa misella is a species of fruit fly in the family Tephritidae.

== Distribution ==
The species is found in the United Kingdom, Spain to Central Asia.
