= Campiglossa ignobilis =

Scientific classification
- Kingdom: Animalia
- Phylum: Arthropoda
- Clade: Pancrustacea
- Class: Insecta
- Order: Diptera
- Family: Tephritidae
- Subfamily: Tephritinae
- Tribe: Tephritini
- Genus: Campiglossa
- Species: C. ignobilis

Binomial name
- Campiglossa ignobilis (Loew, 1861)

Synonyms
- Trypeta ignobilis Loew, 1861; Ensina ignobilis var. plebeja Bezzi, 1924

Species of fly

Campiglossa ignobilis is a species of tephritid or fruit flies in the genus Campiglossa of the family Tephritidae.

== Distribution ==
The species is found in Yemen, Africa.
