= Campiglossa subochracea =

Scientific classification
- Kingdom: Animalia
- Phylum: Arthropoda
- Clade: Pancrustacea
- Class: Insecta
- Order: Diptera
- Family: Tephritidae
- Subfamily: Tephritinae
- Tribe: Tephritini
- Genus: Campiglossa
- Species: C. subochracea

Binomial name
- Campiglossa subochracea (Séguy, 1934)

Synonyms
- Paroxyna subochracea Séguy, 1934

Species of fly

Campiglossa subochracea is a species of fruit fly in the family Tephritidae.

== Distribution ==
The species is found in France.
