= Campiglossa clathrata =

Scientific classification
- Kingdom: Animalia
- Phylum: Arthropoda
- Clade: Pancrustacea
- Class: Insecta
- Order: Diptera
- Family: Tephritidae
- Subfamily: Tephritinae
- Tribe: Tephritini
- Genus: Campiglossa
- Species: C. clathrata

Binomial name
- Campiglossa clathrata (Loew, 1862)

Synonyms
- Trypeta clathrata Loew, 1862

Species of fly

Campiglossa clathrata is a species of fruit fly in the family Tephritidae.
