= Campiglossa dirlbekorum =

Scientific classification
- Kingdom: Animalia
- Phylum: Arthropoda
- Clade: Pancrustacea
- Class: Insecta
- Order: Diptera
- Family: Tephritidae
- Subfamily: Tephritinae
- Tribe: Tephritini
- Genus: Campiglossa
- Species: C. dirlbekorum

Binomial name
- Campiglossa dirlbekorum Norrbom, 1999

Synonyms
- Campiglossa dispertita Dirlbek & Dirlbek, 1971

Species of fly

Campiglossa dirlbekorum is a species of tephritid or fruit flies in the genus Campiglossa of the family Tephritidae.

== Distribution ==
The species is found in Mongolia.
