= Campiglossa messalina =

Scientific classification
- Kingdom: Animalia
- Phylum: Arthropoda
- Clade: Pancrustacea
- Class: Insecta
- Order: Diptera
- Family: Tephritidae
- Subfamily: Tephritinae
- Tribe: Tephritini
- Genus: Campiglossa
- Species: C. messalina

Binomial name
- Campiglossa messalina (Hering, 1937)

Synonyms
- Paroxyna messalina Hering, 1937; Campiglossa ziae Hering, 1953; Paroxyna babajaga Hering, 1938; Paroxyna cleopatra Hering, 1937

Species of fly

Campiglossa messalina is a species of tephritid or fruit flies in the genus Campiglossa of the family Tephritidae.

== Distribution ==
The species is found in Korea, Japan, Russia, China.
