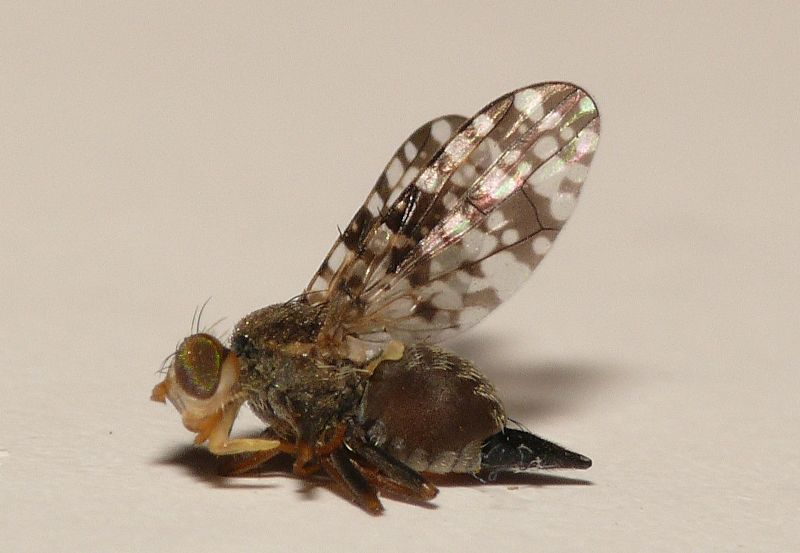

Scientific classification
- Kingdom: Animalia
- Phylum: Arthropoda
- Clade: Pancrustacea
- Class: Insecta
- Order: Diptera
- Family: Tephritidae
- Subfamily: Tephritinae
- Tribe: Tephritini
- Genus: Campiglossa
- Species: C. producta

Binomial name
- Campiglossa producta (Loew, 1844)

Synonyms
- Trypeta producta Loew, 1844; Paroxyna confluens Hering, 1935

= Campiglossa producta =

Species of fly

Campiglossa producta is a species of tephritid or fruit flies in the genus Campiglossa of the family Tephritidae.

== Distribution ==
The species is found in the United Kingdom and south to Turkey, Central Asia, Madeira
