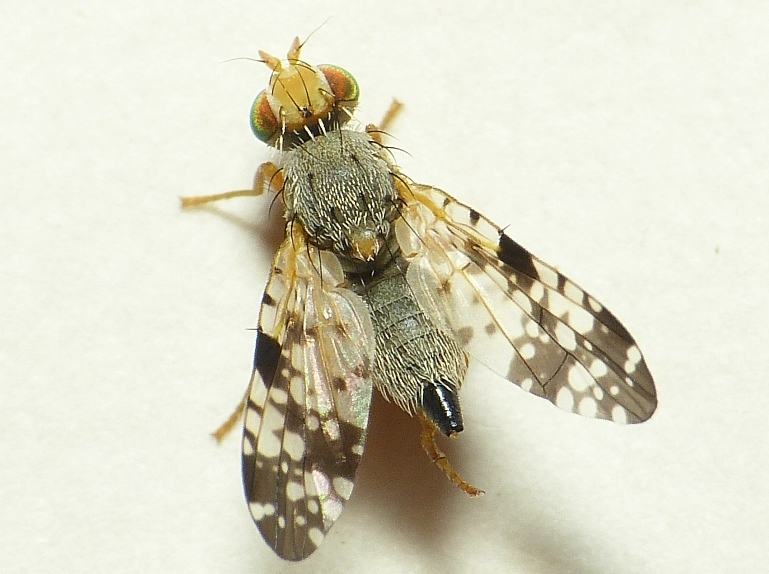

Scientific classification
- Kingdom: Animalia
- Phylum: Arthropoda
- Clade: Pancrustacea
- Class: Insecta
- Order: Diptera
- Family: Tephritidae
- Tribe: Tephritini
- Genus: Campiglossa
- Species: C. malaris

Binomial name
- Campiglossa malaris (Séguy, 1934)

Synonyms
- Paroxyna malaris Séguy, 1934

= Campiglossa malaris =

Species of fly

Campiglossa malaris is a species of fruit fly in the family Tephritidae.

== Distribution ==
The species is found in the United Kingdom, the Netherlands, Belgium, France, Switzerland.
