= Campiglossa irrorata =

Scientific classification
- Kingdom: Animalia
- Phylum: Arthropoda
- Clade: Pancrustacea
- Class: Insecta
- Order: Diptera
- Family: Tephritidae
- Subfamily: Tephritinae
- Tribe: Tephritini
- Genus: Campiglossa
- Species: C. irrorata

Binomial name
- Campiglossa irrorata (Fallén, 1814)

Synonyms
- Tephritis irrorata Fallén, 1814

Species of fly

Campiglossa irrorata is a species of tephritid or fruit flies in the genus Campiglossa of the family Tephritidae.

== Distribution ==
Sweden, Finland, Central Europe, Ukraine, Kazakhstan.
