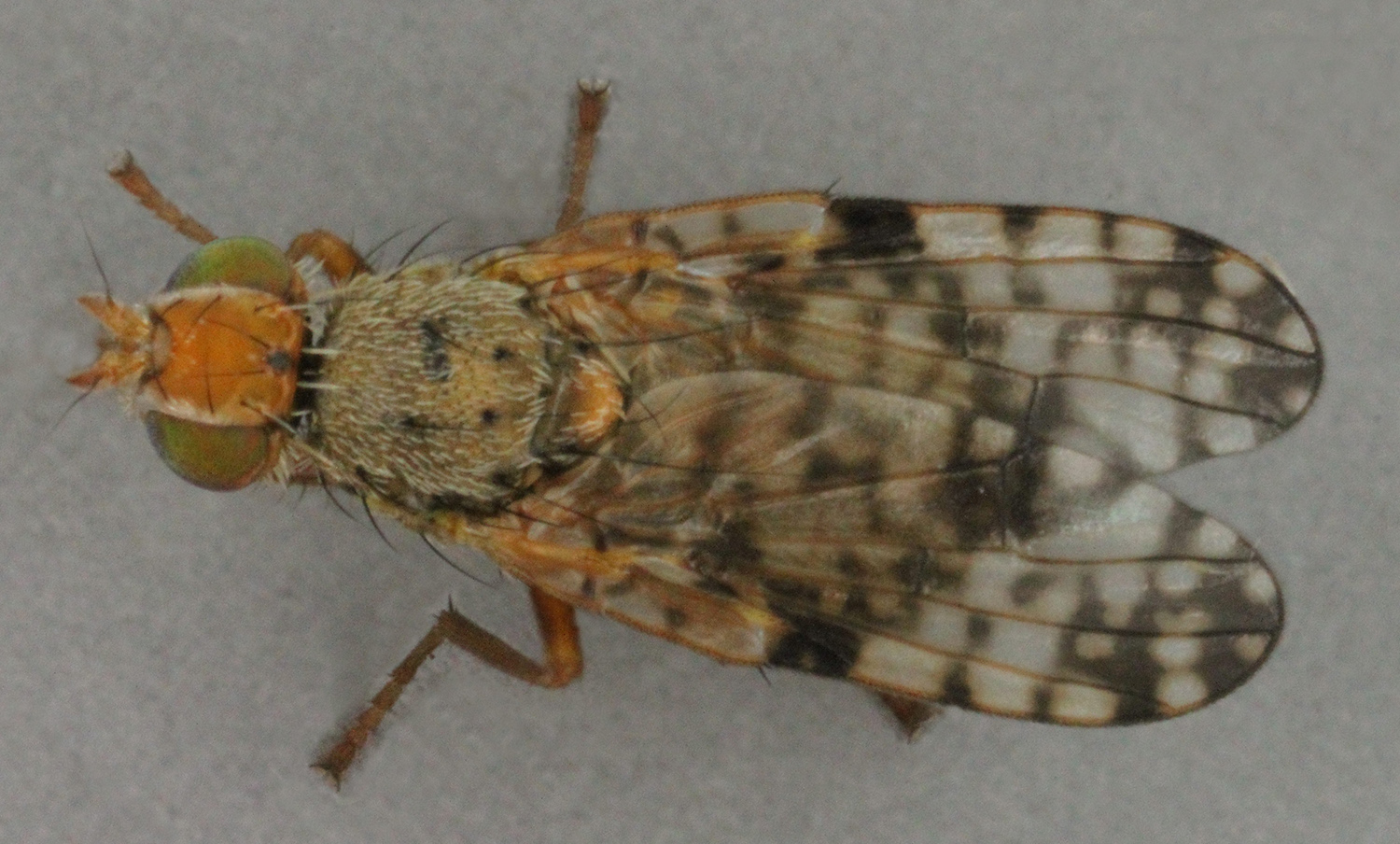

Scientific classification
- Kingdom: Animalia
- Phylum: Arthropoda
- Clade: Pancrustacea
- Class: Insecta
- Order: Diptera
- Family: Tephritidae
- Tribe: Tephritini
- Genus: Campiglossa
- Species: C. plantaginis

Binomial name
- Campiglossa plantaginis (Haliday, 1833)

Synonyms
- Tephritis plantaginis Haliday, 1833; Tephritis pura Boheman, 1864

= Campiglossa plantaginis =

Species of fly

Campiglossa plantaginis is a species of fruit fly in the family Tephritidae.

== Distribution ==
The species is found in coasts of North, the Baltic Sea, the Atlantic Ocean, saline areas of Central, East to Ukraine.
