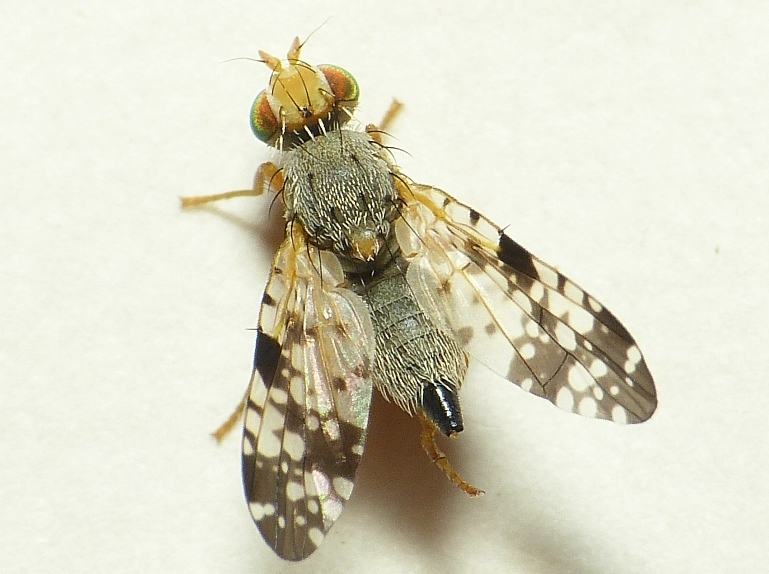
- Campiglossa malaris

Scientific classification
- Kingdom: Animalia
- Phylum: Arthropoda
- Clade: Pancrustacea
- Class: Insecta
- Order: Diptera
- Family: Tephritidae
- Subfamily: Tephritinae
- Tribe: Tephritini
- Genus: Campiglossa; Rondani, 1870

Type species
- Tephritis irrorata Fallén, 1814

Diversity
- at least 190 species

Synonyms
- Aliniana Hendel, 1927; Gonioxyna Hendel, 1927; Paroxyma Palmer & Bennett, 1988; Paroxyna Hering, 1951; Pseudacinia Chen, 1938; Sinotephritis Korneyev, 1989; Whiteina Korneyev, 1989

= Campiglossa =

Genus of flies

Campiglossa is a genus of fruit flies in the family Tephritidae. There are at least 190 described species in Campiglossa.

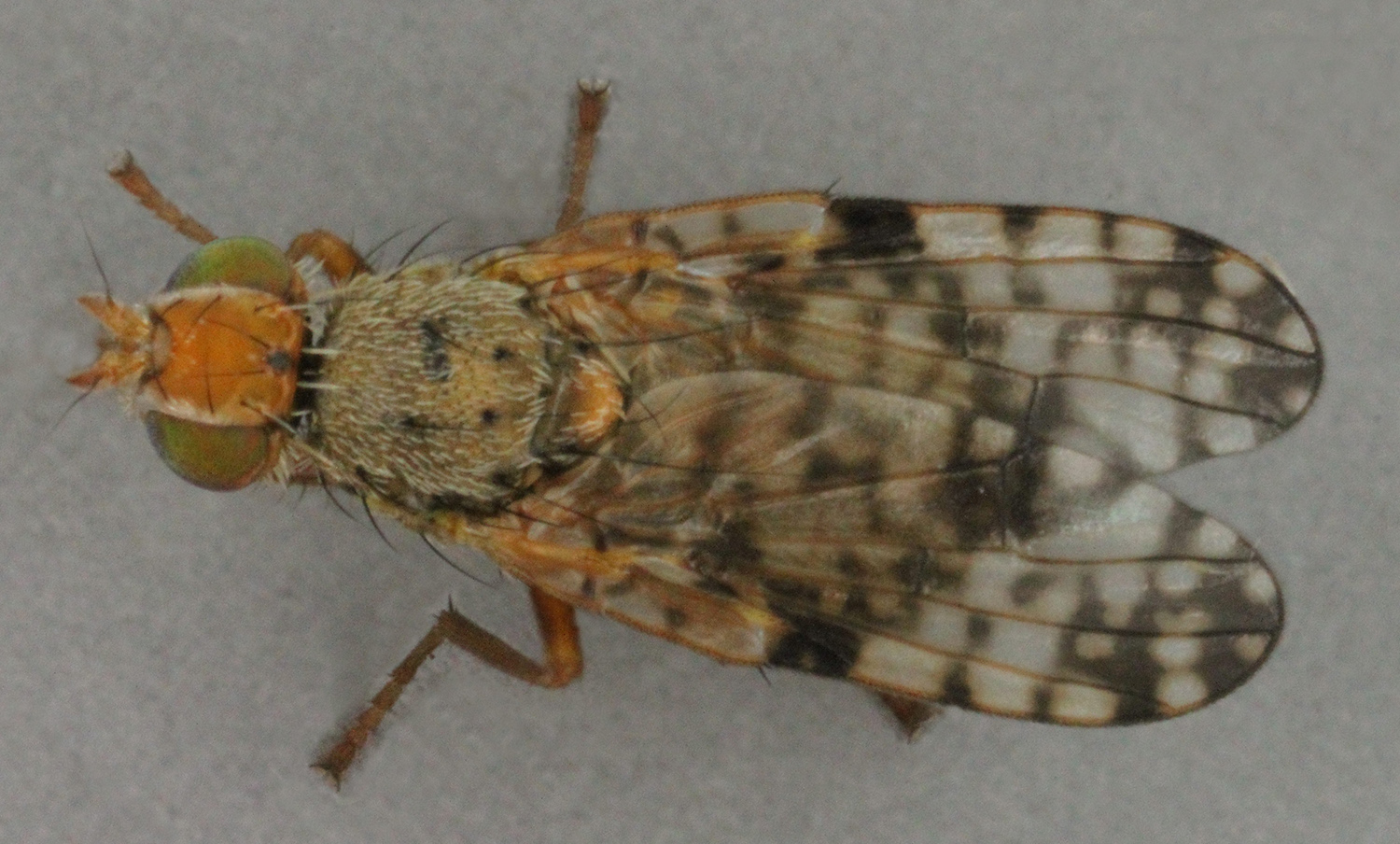
Campiglossa plantaginis

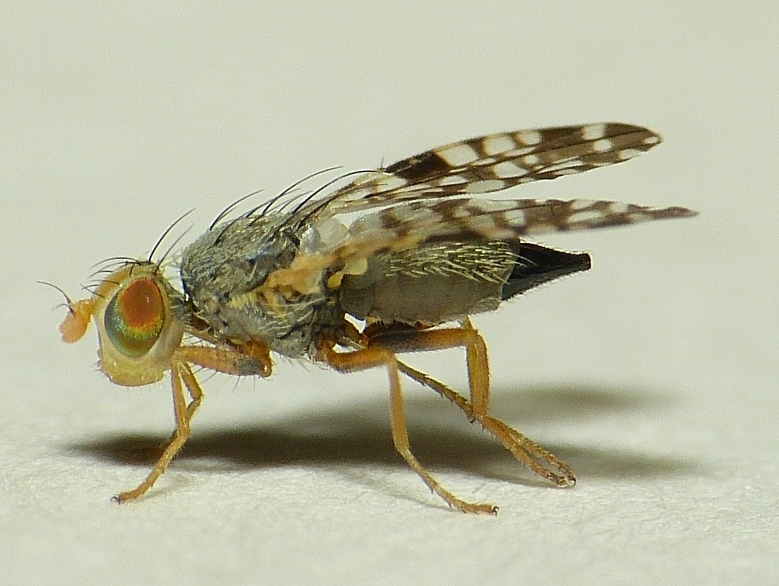
Campiglossa absinthii

== See also ==
- List of Campiglossa species
