= List of encyrtid genera =

There are approximately 506 genera within the family Encyrtidae (Apocrita, Hymenoptera). There are two subfamilies: Encyrtinae and Tetracneminae.

- subfamily Encyrtinae Walker 1837
  - Acerophagus Smith 1880
  - Achalcerinys Girault 1915
  - Adelencyrtoides Tachikawa & Valentine 1969
  - Adelencyrtus Ashmead 1900
  - Adencyrtus Prinsloo 1977
  - Admirencyrtus Hoffer 1960
  - Aenasiella Girault 1914
  - Aenasomyiella Girault 1915
  - Aesaria Noyes & Woolley 1994
  - Aethognathus Silvestri 1915
  - Agarwalencyrtus Hayat 1981
  - Agekianella Trjapitzin 1981
  - Ageniaspis Dahlbom 1857
  - Agromyzaphagus Gahan 1912
  - Allencyrtus Annecke & Mynhardt 1973
  - Allocerchysius Hoffer 1963
  - Aloencyrtus Prinsloo 1978
  - Amauroencyrtus De Santis 1985
  - Ameromyzobia Girault 1916
  - Amicencyrtus Hayat 1981
  - Amicroterys Myartseva 1983
  - Amira Girault 1913
  - Ammonoencyrtus De Santis 1964
  - Anagyrodes Girault 1915
  - Anasemion Annecke 1967
  - Andinoencyrtus Blanchard 1940
  - Anicetus Howard 1896
  - Anisophleps Fidalgo 1981
  - Anthemus Howard 1896
  - Aphidencyrtoides Ishii 1928
  - Aphycinus Trjapitzin 1962
  - Aphycoides Mercet 1921
  - Aphycomastix De Santis 1972
  - Aphycomorpha Timberlake 1919
  - Aphycopsis Timberlake 1916
  - Aphyculus Hoffer 1954
  - Aphycus Mayr 1876
  - Apsilophrys De Santis 1964
  - Archinus Howard 1897
  - Argutencyrtus Prinsloo & Annecke 1974
  - Arhopoidiella Noyes 1980
  - Arrhenophagoidea Girault 1915
  - Arrhenophagus Aurivillius 1888
  - Arzonella Pagliano & Scaramozzino 1990
  - Aschitus Mercet 1921
  - Aseirba Cameron 1884
  - Asterolecanobius Tachikawa 1963
  - Astymachus Howard 1898
  - Atelaphycus Blanchard 1940
  - Atropates Howard 1898
  - Australanusia Girault 1922
  - Australaphycus Girault 1923
  - Austrochoreia Girault 1929
  - Austroencyrtoidea Girault 1922
  - Austroencyrtus Girault 1923
  - Austromira Girault 1924
  - Avetianella Trjapitzin 1968
  - Aztecencyrtus Timberlake 1926
  - Baeoanusia Girault 1915
  - Baeocharis Mayr 1876
  - Baeoencyrtus De Santis 1964
  - Beethovena Girault 1932
  - Bennettisca Noyes 1980
  - Blanchardiscus De Santis 1964
  - Blastothrix Mayr 1876
  - Blatticidella Gahan & Fagan 1923
  - Bolangera Hayat & Noyes 1986
  - Borrowella Girault 1923
  - Bothriocraera Timberlake 1916
  - Bothriophryne Compere 1937
  - Bothriothorax Ratzeburg 1844
  - Boucekiella Hoffer 1954
  - Brachyencyrtus Hoffer 1959
  - Brachyplatycerus De Santis 1972
  - Brethesiella Timberlake 1920
  - Caenohomalopoda Tachikawa 1979
  - Caldencyrtus Noyes & Hanson 1996
  - Carabunia Waterston 1928
  - Casus Noyes & Woolley 1994
  - Ceballosia Mercet 1921
  - Centencyrtus Noyes & Woolley 1994
  - Cerapteroceroides Ashmead 1904
  - Cerapterocerus Westwood 1833
  - Ceraptroceroideus Girault 1916
  - Cerchysiella Girault 1914
  - Cerchysius Westwood 1832
  - Cercobelus Walker 1842
  - Charitopsis Trjapitzin 1969
  - Cheiloneurella Girault 1915
  - Cheiloneuromyia Girault 1915
  - Cheiloneurus Westwood 1833
  - Cheilopsis Prinsloo 1983
  - Choreia Westwood 1833
  - Chrysomelechthrus Trjapitzin 1977
  - Cibdeloencyrtus De Santis 1964
  - Cicoencyrtus Noyes 1980
  - Cirrhencyrtus Timberlake 1918
  - Coagerus Noyes & Hayat 1984
  - Coccidaphycus Blanchard 1940
  - Coccidencyrtus Ashmead 1900
  - Coccidoctonus Crawford 1912
  - Coccopilatus Annecke 1963
  - Coelopencyrtus Timberlake 1919
  - Comones Noyes & Woolley 1994
  - Comperia Gomes 1942
  - Comperiella Howard 1906
  - Conchynilla Girault 1923
  - Copidosoma Ratzeburg 1844
  - Copidosomopsis Girault 1915
  - Copidosomyia Girault 1915
  - Cowperia Girault 1919
  - Cyderius Noyes 1980
  - Deilio Noyes & Woolley 1994
  - Deloencyrtus De Santis 1967
  - Diaphorencyrtus Hayat 1981
  - Diasula Noyes & Hayat 1984
  - Dionencyrtus De Santis 1985
  - Discodes Förster 1856
  - Diversinervus Silvestri 1915
  - Doddanusia Noyes & Hayat 1984
  - Ebito Noyes & Woolley 1994
  - Echthrobaccella Girault 1915
  - Echthrogonatopus Perkins 1906
  - Echthroplexiella Mercet 1921
  - Echthroplexis Förster 1856
  - Ectroma Westwood 1833
  - Encyrtoalces De Santis 1985
  - Encyrtoidea Girault 1923
  - Encyrtus Latreille 1809
  - Epiblatticida Girault 1915
  - Epicerchysius Girault 1915
  - Epiencyrtus Ashmead 1900
  - Epistenoterys Girault 1915
  - Epitetracnemus Girault 1915
  - Epitetralophidea Girault 1915
  - Eremencyrtus Trjapitzin 1972
  - Erencyrtus Mahdihassan 1923
  - Ethoris Noyes & Hayat 1984
  - Eucoccidophagus Hoffer 1963
  - Eugahania Mercet 1926
  - Euogus Noyes & Woolley 1994
  - Eupoecilopoda Novicky & Hoffer 1953
  - Euscapularia Hoffer 1976
  - Eusemion Dahlbom 1857
  - Exoristobia Ashmead 1904
  - Forcipestricis Burks 1968
  - Formicencyrtus Girault 1916
  - Fulgoridicida Perkins 1906
  - Gahaniella Timberlake 1926
  - Gentakola Noyes & Hayat 1984
  - Ginsiana Erdös & Novicky 1955
  - Globulencyrtus Hoffer 1976
  - Gonzalezia De Santis 1964
  - Grissellia Noyes 1980
  - Gwala Noyes & Woolley 1994
  - Habrolepis Förster 1856
  - Habrolepoidea Howard 1894
  - Habrolepopteryx Ashmead 1900
  - Hadrencyrtus Annecke & Mynhardt 1973
  - Hadzhibeylia Myartseva & Trjapitzin 1981
  - Haligra Noyes & Hayat 1984
  - Helegonatopus Perkins 1906
  - Helygia Noyes & Woolley 1994
  - Hemencyrtus Ashmead 1900
  - Hemileucoceras Hoffer 1976
  - Hengata Noyes & Hayat 1984
  - Hesperencyrtus Annecke 1971
  - Heterococcidoxenus Ishii 1940
  - Hexacladia Ashmead 1891
  - Hexacnemus Timberlake 1926
  - Hexencyrtus Girault 1915
  - Homalopoda Howard 1894
  - Homalotyloidea Mercet 1921
  - Homalotylus Mayr 1876
  - Homosemion Annecke 1967
  - Hoplopsis De Stefani 1889
  - Hypergonatopus Timberlake 1922
  - Iceromyia Noyes 1980
  - Ilicia Mercet 1921
  - Indaphycus Hayat 1981
  - Ioessa Erdös 1955
  - Islawes Noyes & Woolley 1994
  - Isodromoides Girault 1914
  - Isodromus Howard 1887
  - Ixodiphagus Howard 1907
  - Kataka Noyes & Hayat 1984
  - Koenigsmannia Trjapitzin 1982
  - Kurdjumovia Trjapitzin 1977
  - Laccacida Prinsloo 1977
  - Lakshaphagus Mahdihassan 1931
  - Lamennaisia Girault 1922
  - Leefmansia Waterston 1928
  - Leiocyrtus Erdös & Novicky 1955
  - Leurocerus Crawford 1911
  - Lirencyrtus Noyes 1980
  - Lochitoencyrtus De Santis 1964
  - Lohiella Noyes 1980
  - Lombitsikala Risbec 1957
  - Mahencyrtus Masi 1917
  - Manmohanencyrtus Singh 1995
  - Mariola Noyes 1980
  - Mashhoodiella Hayat 1972
  - Mayrencyrtus Hincks 1944
  - Mayridia Mercet 1921
  - Melys Noyes & Woolley 1994
  - Meniscocephalus Perkins 1906
  - Merlen Noyes & Woolley 1994
  - Meromyzobia Ashmead 1900
  - Mesanusia Girault 1922
  - Mesastymachus Girault 1923
  - Mesocalocerinus Girault 1922
  - Mesorhopella Girault 1923
  - Metablastothrix Sugonjaev 1964
  - Metanotalia Mercet 1921
  - Metaphycus Mercet 1917
  - Metapsyllaephagus Myartseva 1980
  - Microterys Thomson 1876
  - Moorella Cameron 1913
  - Mozartella Girault 1926
  - Mucrencyrtus Noyes 1980
  - Muluencyrtus Noyes & Hayat 1984
  - Nassauia Girault 1932
  - Nathismusia Noyes & Hayat 1984
  - Neabrolepoideus Girault 1917
  - Neapsilophrys Noyes 1980
  - Neastymachus Girault 1915
  - Neblatticida Girault 1915
  - Negeniaspidius Trjapitzin 1982
  - Neocladella Girault 1915
  - Neocladia Perkins 1906
  - Neococcidencyrtus Compere 1928
  - Neocyrtus Trjapitzin 1985
  - Nerissa Trjapitzin 1977
  - Nezarhopalus Girault 1915
  - Oesol Noyes & Woolley 1994
  - Olypusa Noyes & Hayat 1984
  - Oobius Trjapitzin 1963
  - Ooencyrtus Ashmead 1900
  - Oophagus Liao 1987
  - Orianos Noyes 1990
  - Oriencyrtus Sugonjaev & Trjapitzin 1974
  - Ovaloencyrtus Noyes & Hayat 1984
  - Ovidoencyrtus Girault 1924
  - Paksimmondsius Ahmad & Ghani 1974
  - Papaka Noyes 1980
  - Papuna Noyes & Hayat 1984
  - Parablastothrix Mercet 1917
  - Parablatticida Girault 1915
  - Parachalcerinys Girault 1925
  - Paracladella Girault 1920
  - Paraenasomyia Girault 1915
  - Paramucrona Noyes 1980
  - Paraphaenodiscus Girault 1915
  - Paraphycus Girault 1915
  - Parasauleia Hoffer 1968
  - Paraschedius Mercet 1925
  - Parastenoterys Girault 1915
  - Paratetracnemoidea Girault 1915
  - Paratetralophidea Girault 1915
  - Parechthrodryinus Girault 1916
  - Parectromoides Girault 1915
  - Parencyrtomyia Girault 1915
  - Parencyrtus Ashmead 1900
  - Pareupelmus Kryger 1951
  - Pareusemion Ishii 1925
  - Pasulinia Noyes & Hayat 1984
  - Pawenus Noyes & Woolley 1994
  - Pentacladocerus Erdös 1963
  - Pentelicus Howard 1895
  - Perpolia Noyes & Woolley 1994
  - Phauloencyrtus Girault 1940
  - Philosindia Noyes & Hayat 1984
  - Pistulina Hoffer 1976
  - Plagiomerus Crawford 1910
  - Platencyrtus Ferrière 1955
  - Prionomastix Mayr 1876
  - Prionomitoides Girault 1915
  - Prionomitus Mayr 1876
  - Prochiloneurus Silvestri 1915
  - Proleuroceroides Shafee, Alam & Agarwal 1975
  - Proleurocerus Ferrière 1935
  - Protyndarichoides Noyes 1980
  - Pseudaphycus Clausen 1915
  - Pseudectroma Girault 1915
  - Pseudencyrtoides Gordh & Trjapitzin 1975
  - Pseudencyrtus Ashmead 1900
  - Pseudhomalopoda Girault 1915
  - Pseudococcobius Timberlake 1916
  - Pseudorhopus Timberlake 1926
  - Psilophryoidea Compere 1928
  - Psilophrys Mayr 1876
  - Psyllaephagus Ashmead 1900
  - Psyllaphycus Hayat 1972
  - Psyllechthrus Ghesquière 1958
  - Pulexencyrtus Noyes & Woolley 1994
  - Quadrencyrtus Hoffer 1952
  - Raffaellia Girault 1922
  - Rhopalencyrtoidea Girault 1915
  - Rhytidothorax Ashmead 1900
  - Ruandella Risbec 1957
  - Ruskiniana Girault 1923
  - Saera Noyes & Woolley 1994
  - Sanghalia Risbec 1955
  - Saprencyrtus Noyes & Hayat 1984
  - Sarisencyrtus Noyes & Woolley 1994
  - Satureia Noyes & Woolley 1994
  - Sauleia Sugonjaev 1964
  - Scotteus Masi 1917
  - Sectiliclava Hoffer 1957
  - Semen Hoffer 1954
  - Shenahetia Noyes 1980
  - Simmondsiella Noyes 1980
  - Solenaphycus De Santis 1972
  - Solenoencyrtus De Santis 1964
  - Spaniopterus Gahan 1927
  - Stemmatosteres Timberlake 1918
  - Stenoteropsis Girault 1915
  - Subprionomitus Mercet 1921
  - Syrphophagus Ashmead 1900
  - Szelenyiola Trjapitzin 1977
  - Tachardiaephagus Ashmead 1904
  - Tachardiobius Timberlake 1926
  - Tachinaephagus Ashmead 1904
  - Tanyencyrtus De Santis 1972
  - Tassonia Girault 1921
  - Teleterebratus Compere & Zinna 1955
  - Tetarticlava Noyes 1980
  - Tetracyclos Kryger 1942
  - Thomsonisca Ghesquière 1946
  - Tineophoctonus Ashmead 1900
  - Tobiasia Trjapitzin 1962
  - Trechnites Thomson 1876
  - Tremblaya Trjapitzin 1985
  - Trichomasthus Thomson 1876
  - Trigonogaster Guérin-Méneville 1844
  - Trjapitzinellus Viggiani 1967
  - Tyndarichus Howard 1910
  - Tyndaricopsis Gordh & Trjapitzin 1981
  - Vietmachus Sugonjaev 1995
  - Viggianiola Trjapitzin 1982
  - Whittieria Girault 1938
  - Xenoencyrtus Riek 1962
  - Xenostryxis Girault 1920
  - Xerencyrtus Trjapitzin 1972
  - Xylencyrtus Annecke 1968
  - Zaomma Ashmead 1900
  - Zaommoencyrtus Girault 1916
  - Zarhopaloides Girault 1915
  - Zelaphycus Noyes 1988
  - Zelencyrtus Noyes 1988
  - Zooencyrtus Girault 1915
  - Zozoros Noyes & Hayat 1984
- subfamily Tetracneminae Howard 1892
  - Acerophagoides Blanchard 1940
  - Adektitopus Noyes & Hayat 1984
  - Aenasius Walker 1846
  - Aeptencyrtus De Santis 1964
  - Aglyptus Förster 1856
  - Alamella Agarwal 1966
  - Allocerellus Silvestri 1915
  - Amasyxia Noyes 2000
  - Ameniscocephalus Girault 1915
  - Anagyrietta Ferrière 1955
  - Anagyrus Howard 1896
  - Ananusia Girault 1917
  - Anomalencyrtus Hayat & Verma 1980
  - Anomalicornia Mercet 1921
  - Anusia Förster 1856
  - Anusioptera Brues 1910
  - Apoleptomastix Kerrich 1982
  - Aquaencyrtus Hoffer 1952
  - Asencyrtus Trjapitzin 1972
  - Asitus Erdös 1955
  - Avernes Noyes & Woolley 1994
  - Bactritopus Trjapitzin 1989
  - Blepyrus Howard 1898
  - Bureshiella Hoffer 1983
  - Callaincyrtus Prinsloo & Annecke 1979
  - Callipteroma Motschulsky 1863
  - Ceraptrocerella Girault 1918
  - Charitopus Förster 1856
  - Chrysoplatycerus Ashmead 1889
  - Cladiscodes Subba Rao 1977
  - Clausenia Ishii 1923
  - Coccidoxenoides Girault 1915
  - Cryptanusia Girault 1917
  - Cryptoplatycerus Trjapitzin 1982
  - Cyrtocoryphes Timberlake 1926
  - Dicarnosis Mercet 1921
  - Dinocarsiella Mercet 1921
  - Dinocarsis Förster 1856
  - Dusmetia Mercet 1921
  - Ectromatopsis Compere 1947
  - Eotopus Noyes & Hayat 1984
  - Epanusia Girault 1913
  - Eremophasma Sugonjaev & Trjapitzin 1979
  - Ericydnus Haliday 1832
  - Euzkadiella Mercet 1922
  - Extencyrtus Noyes & Woolley 1994
  - Gafsa Thuroczy & Trjapitzin 1990
  - Gavria Noyes 2000
  - Gyranusoidea Compere 1947
  - Hambletonia Compere 1936
  - Hipponactis Noyes 2000
  - Hofferencyrtus Boucek 1977
  - Holanusomyia Girault 1915
  - Holcencyrtus Ashmead 1900
  - Incisencyrtus Prinsloo 1988
  - Leptomastidea Mercet 1916
  - Leptomastix Förster 1856
  - Lutherisca Ghesquière 1946
  - Lyka Mercet 1921
  - Manicnemus Hayat 1981
  - Marxella Girault 1932
  - Mashhoodia Shafee 1972
  - Metaphaenodiscus Mercet 1921
  - Mira Schellenberg 1803
  - Mohelencyrtus Hoffer 1969
  - Mohelniella Hoffer 1964
  - Monodiscodes Hoffer 1953
  - Monstranusia Trjapitzin 1964
  - Moraviella Hoffer 1954
  - Neocharitopus Hayat, Alam & Agarwal 1975
  - Neodusmetia Kerrich 1964
  - Neoplatycerus Subba Rao 1965
  - Neorhopus Girault 1917
  - Nesebaria Hoffer 1970
  - Notodusmetia Noyes 1988
  - Odiaglyptus Noyes 1988
  - Paraclausenia Hayat 1980
  - Paracopidosoma Hoffer 1957
  - Paraenasioidea Hoffer 1953
  - Paramasia Hoffer 1953
  - Paranathrix Myartseva 1980
  - Parapyrus Noyes 1984
  - Parectromoidella Girault 1915
  - Pelmatencyrtus De Santis 1964
  - Peneax Noyes 2000
  - Phasmocephalon Trjapitzin 1977
  - Phasmocera Trjapitzin 1971
  - Phasmopoda Trjapitzin 1977
  - Praleurocerus Agarwal 1974
  - Pseudleptomastix Girault 1915
  - Rhopus Förster 1856
  - Ruanderoma Noyes & Hayat 1984
  - Sakencyrtus Hayat 1981
  - Savzdargia Trjapitzin 1979
  - Schilleriella Ghesquière 1946
  - Taftia Ashmead 1904
  - Tetracnemoidea Howard 1898
  - Tetracnemus Westwood 1837
  - Tricnemus Mercet 1921
  - Tropidophryne Compere 1931
  - Vosleria Timberlake 1926
  - Xanthoectroma Mercet 1925
  - Xenanusia Girault 1917
  - Yasumatsuiola Trjapitzin 1977
  - Zaplatycerus Timberlake 1925
  - Zarhopalus Ashmead 1900
