= Ooencyrtus marcelloi =

Scientific classification
- Domain: Eukaryota
- Kingdom: Animalia
- Phylum: Arthropoda
- Class: Insecta
- Order: Hymenoptera
- Family: Encyrtidae
- Genus: Ooencyrtus
- Species: O. marcelloi

Binomial name
- Ooencyrtus marcelloi Guerrieri & Noyes, 2010

Species of wasp

Ooencyrtus marcelloi is a parasitic wasp belonging to the family Encyrtidae. The species was first discovered in 2008 in a tropical lowland rainforest in the Soberanía National Park around Gamboa, Panama. The scientific name was first published in 2010.

Female length 0.9 mm; male length 0.7-0.8 mm. The hosts of this parasitic wasp are eggs of Heliconiini butterflies. Parasitized eggs were found on passion vines: Passiflora auriculata, Passiflora biflora, Passiflora coriacea and Passiflora vitifolia. From one butterfly egg, a single wasp emerges.
