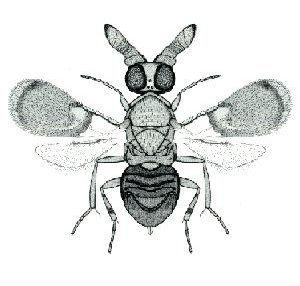
- Anicetus communis

Scientific classification
- Kingdom: Animalia
- Phylum: Arthropoda
- Class: Insecta
- Order: Hymenoptera
- Family: Encyrtidae
- Subfamily: Encyrtinae

Genera
- See text

= Encyrtinae =

Subfamily of wasps

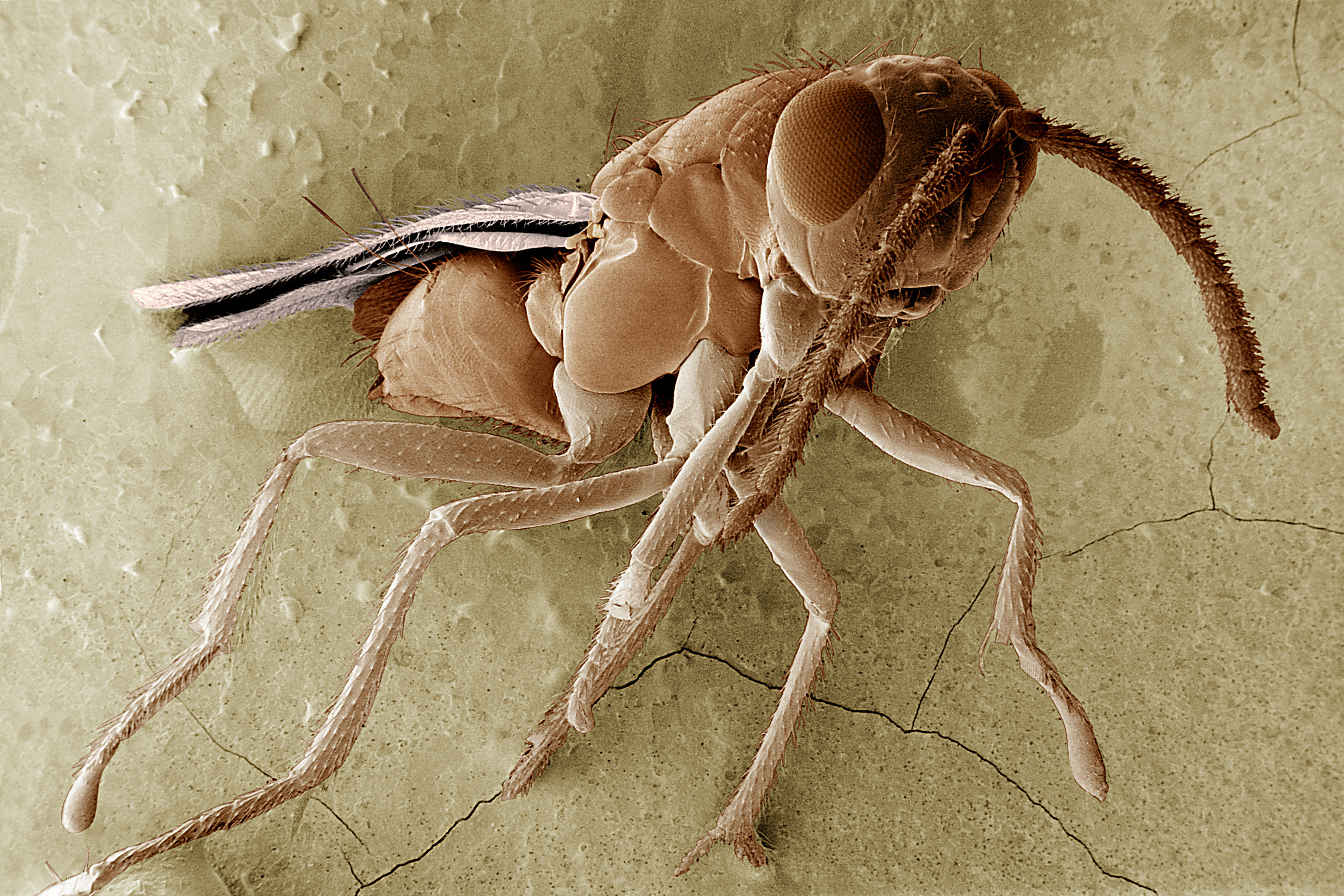
Tachinaephagus zealandicus

Encyrtinae is a subfamily of parasitic wasps in the family Encyrtidae.

== Genera ==
- Acerophagus - Achalcerinys - Adelencyrtoides - Adelencyrtus - Adencyrtus - Admirencyrtus - Aenasiella - Aenasomyiella - Aesaria - Aethognathus - Agarwalencyrtus - Agekianella - Ageniaspis - Agromyzaphagus - Allencyrtus - Allocerchysius - Aloencyrtus - Amauroencyrtus - Ameromyzobia - Amicencyrtus - Amicroterys - Amira - Ammonoencyrtus - Anagyrodes - Anasemion - Andinoencyrtus - Anicetus - Anisophleps - Anthemus - Aphidencyrtoides - Aphycinus - Aphycoides - Aphycomastix - Aphycomorpha - Aphycopsis - Aphyculus - Aphycus - Apsilophrys - Archinus - Argutencyrtus - Arhopoidiella - Arketypon - Arrhenophagoidea - Arrhenophagus - Arzonella - Aschitus - Aseirba - Asterolecanobius - Astymachus - Atelaphycus - Atropates - Australanusia - Australaphycus - Austrochoreia - Austroencyrtoidea - Austroencyrtus - Austromira - Avetianella - Aztecencyrtus - Baeoanusia - Baeocharis - Baeoencyrtus - Beethovena - Bennettisca - Blanchardiscus - Blastothrix - Blatticidella - Bolangera - Borrowella - Bothriocraera - Bothriophryne - Bothriothorax - Boucekiella - Brachyencyrtus - Brachyplatycerus - Brethesiella - Caenohomalopoda - Caldencyrtus - Carabunia - Casus - Ceballosia - Centencyrtus - Cerapteroceroides - Cerapterocerus - Ceraptroceroideus - Cerchysiella - Cerchysius - Cercobelus - Charitopsis - Cheiloneurella - Cheiloneuromyia - Cheiloneurus - Cheilopsis - Choreia - Chorotega - Chrysomelechthrus - Cibdeloencyrtus - Cicoencyrtus - Cirrhencyrtus - Clivia - Coagerus - Coccidaphycus - Coccidencyrtus - Coccidoctonus - Coccopilatus - Coelopencyrtus - Comones - Comperia - Comperiella - Conchynilla - Copidosoma - Copidosomopsis - Copidosomyia - Cowperia - Cranencyrtus - Cyderius - Deilio - Deloencyrtus - Diaphorencyrtus - Diasula - Dionencyrtus - Discodes - Diversinervus - Doddanusia - Ebito - Echthrobaccella - Echthroplexiella - Echthroplexis - Ectroma - Encyrtoalces - Encyrtoidea - Encyrtus - Eocencyrtus - Epiblatticida - Epicerchysius - Epiencyrtus - Epistenoterys - Epitetracnemus - Epitetralophidea - Eremencyrtus - Erencyrtus - Ethoris - Eucoccidophagus - Eugahania - Euogus - Euscapularia - Eusemion - Exoristobia - Forcipestricis - Formicencyrtus - Fulgoridicida - Gahaniella - Gentakola - Ginsiana - Globulencyrtus - Gonzalezia - Grissellia - Gwala - Habrolepis - Habrolepoidea - Habrolepopteryx - Hadrencyrtus - Hadzhibeylia - Haligra - Helegonatopus - Helygia - Hemencyrtus - Hemileucoceras - Hengata - Hesperencyrtus - Heterococcidoxenus - Hexacladia - Hexacnemus - Hexencyrtus - Homalopoda - Homalotyloidea - Homalotylus - Homosemion - Hoplopsis - Iceromyia - Ilicia - Inbiaphycus - Indaphycus - Ioessa - Islawes - Isodromoides - Isodromus - Ixodiphagus - Kataka - Koenigsmannia - Kurdjumovia - Laccacida - Lakshaphagus - Lamennaisia - Leefmansia - Leiocyrtus - Leurocerus - Lirencyrtus - Lochitoencyrtus - Lohiella - Lombitsikala - Mahencyrtus - Manmohanencyrtus - Mariola - Mashhoodiella - Mayrencyrtus - Mayridia - Melys - Meniscocephalus - Merlen - Meromyzobia - Mesanusia - Mesastymachus - Mesocalocerinus - Mesorhopella - Metablastothrix - Metanotalia - Metaphycus - Metapsyllaephagus - Microterys - Moorella - Mozartella - Mucrencyrtus - Muluencyrtus - Nassauia - Nathismusia - Neabrolepoideus - Neapsilophrys - Neastymachus - Neblatticida - Neocladella - Neocladia - Neococcidencyrtus - Neocyrtus - Neperpolia - Nerissa - Neruandella - Nezarhopalus - Oesol - Olypusa - Oobius - Ooencyrtus - Oophagus - Orianos - Oriencyrtus - Ovaloencyrtus - Ovidoencyrtus - Paksimmondsius - Papaka - Papuna - Parablastothrix - Parablatticida - Parachalcerinys - Paracladella - Paraenasomyia - Paramucrona - Paraphaenodiscus - Paraphycus - Parasauleia - Parastenoterys - Paratetracnemoidea - Paratetralophidea - Parechthrodryinus - Parectromoides - Parencyrtomyia - Parencyrtus - Pareupelmus - Pareusemion - Pasulinia - Pawenus - Pentacladocerus - Pentelicus - Perpolia - Phauloencyrtus - Philosindia - Pistulina - Plagiomerus - Platencyrtus - Prionomastix - Prionomitoides - Prionomitus - Prochiloneurus - Profundiscrobis - Proleuroceroides - Proleurocerus - Protaenasius - Protyndarichoides - Pseudectroma - Pseudencyrtoides - Pseudencyrtus - Pseudhomalopoda - Pseudococcobius - Pseudorhopus - Psilophryoidea - Psilophrys - Psyllaephagus - Psyllaphycus - Psyllechthrus - Pulexencyrtus - Quadrencyrtus - Raffaellia - Rhopalencyrtoidea - Rhytidothorax - Ruandella - Ruskiniana - Saera - Sanghalia - Saprencyrtus - Sarisencyrtus - Satureia - Saucrencyrtus - Sauleia - Scotteus - Sectiliclava - Semen - Sharqencyrtus - Shenahetia - Simmondsiella - Solenaphycus - Solenoencyrtus - Spaniopterus - Stemmatosteres - Stenoteropsis - Subprionomitus - Syrphophagus - Szelenyiola - Tachardiaephagus - Tachardiobius - Tachinaephagus - Tanyencyrtus - Teleterebratus - Tetarticlava - Tetracyclos - Thomsonisca - Tineophoctonus - Tobiasia - Tonkinencyrtus - Trechnites - Tremblaya - Trichomasthus - Trigonogaster - Trjapitzinellus - Tyndarichus - Tyndaricopsis - Vietmachus - Viggianiola - Vivamexico - Whittieria - Xenoencyrtus - Xenostryxis - Xerencyrtus - Xylencyrtus - Zaomma - Zaommoencyrtus - Zarhopaloides - Zelaphycus - Zelencyrtus - Zooencyrtus - Zozoros
