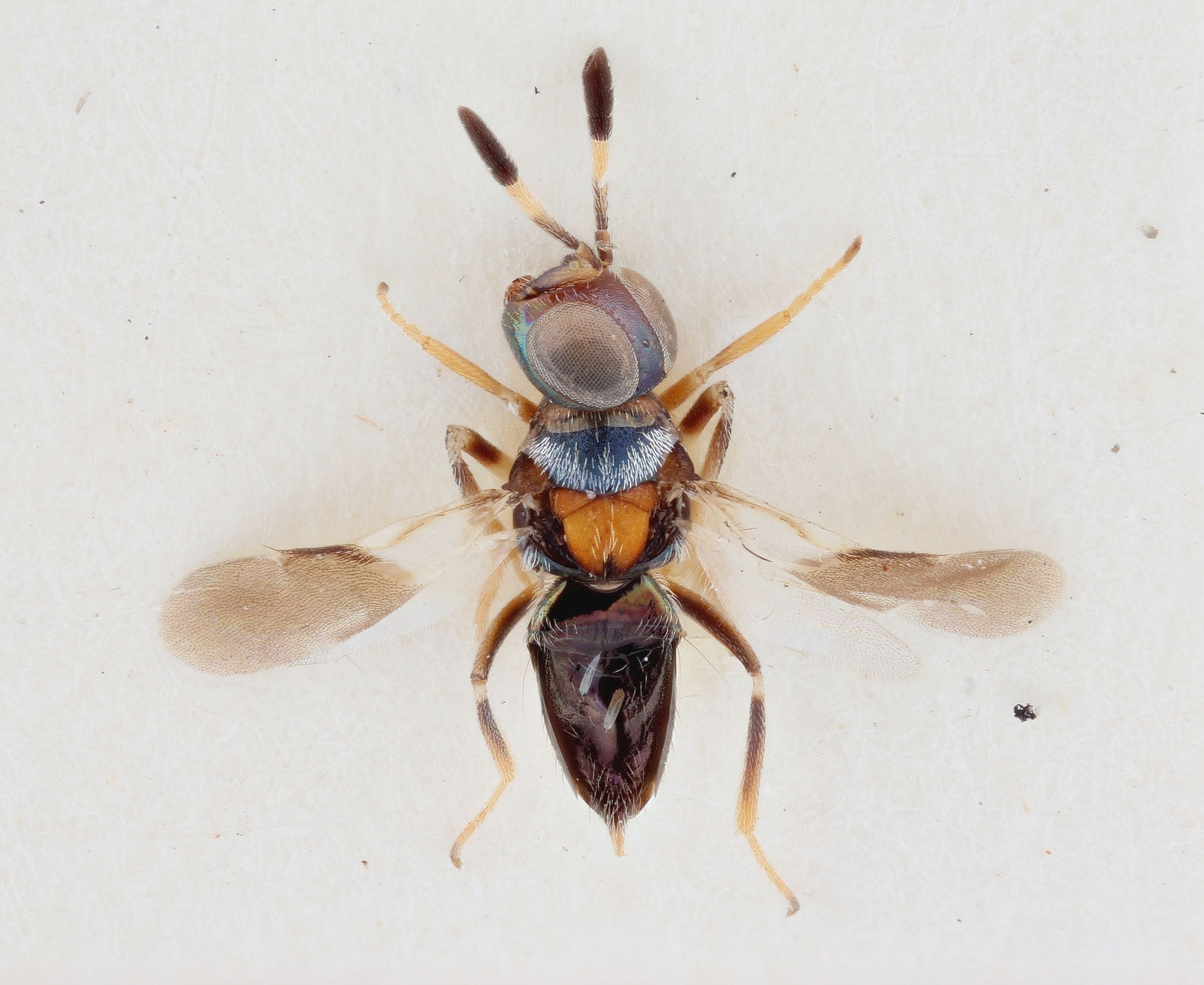
- female specimen held at the Natural History Museum, London

Scientific classification
- Kingdom: Animalia
- Phylum: Arthropoda
- Class: Insecta
- Order: Hymenoptera
- Family: Encyrtidae
- Genus: Cheiloneurus
- Species: C. paralia

Binomial name
- Cheiloneurus paralia (Walker, 1837)

Synonyms
- Encyrtus paralia Walker, 1837; Encyrtus formosus Boheman; Cheiloneurus eriococci Alam, 1957; Cheiloneurus formosus Boheman; Cheiloneurus formosus brachyptera Hoffer, 1957; Cheiloneurus formosus nigrithorax Hoffer, 1957; Cheiloneurus formosus submacroptera Hoffer, 1957; Cheiloneurus mongolicus Szelenyi,1971; Chiloneurus formosus (Boheman); Chiloneurus paralia (Walker)

= Cheiloneurus paralia =

Species of chalcid wasp

Cheiloneurus paralia is a species of chalcid wasp in the family Encyrtidae. It is found in Europe. It is a parasitoid of mealybugs.

== Taxonomy ==
This species was first described in 1837 by Francis Walker, within Monographia Chalciditum, and named Encyrtus paralia on the basis of a specimen collected in July from the "south of France".

== Distribution ==
This species has been (according to GBIF), observed in: Iran, Norway, UK, Mongolia, Sweden, Hungary, and Greece.
