= Neocladia =

Neocladia may refer to:

- Neocladia (sponge), a sponge genus in the order Poecilosclerida
- Neocladia (wasp), a wasp genus in the subfamily Encyrtinae
