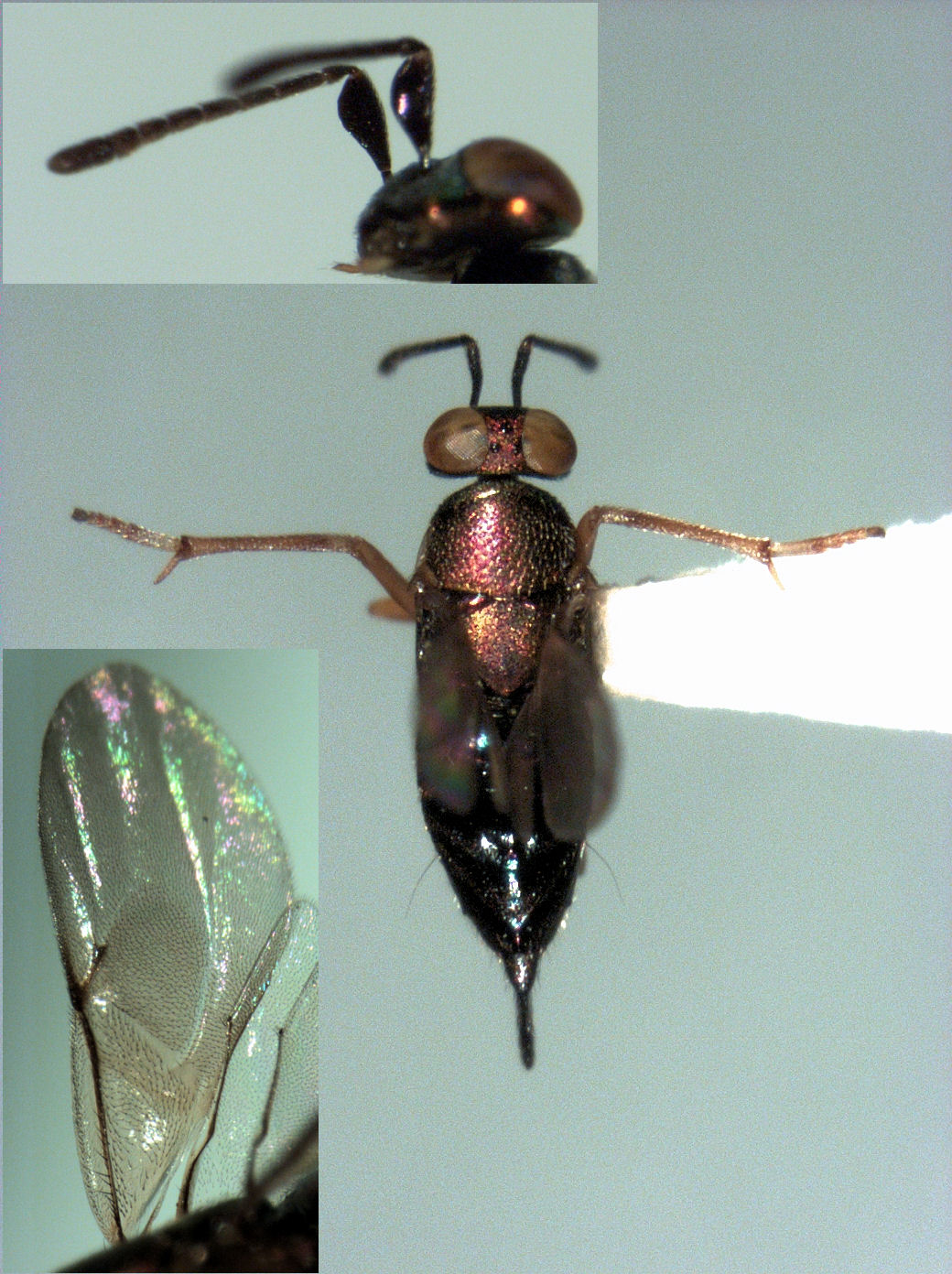
- Female P. cornwallensis

Scientific classification
- Kingdom: Animalia
- Phylum: Arthropoda
- Class: Insecta
- Order: Hymenoptera
- Family: Encyrtidae
- Subfamily: Encyrtinae
- Genus: Psyllaephagus; Ashmead, 1900

Type species
- Encyrtus pachypsllae Howard, 1885

Synonyms
- Anagyropsis Girault, 1917; Anisodromus Riek, 1962; Calluniphilus Erdős, 1961; Calocerineloides Girault, 1913; Epanagyrus Girault, 1915; Kaszabicyrtus Szelènyi, 1971; Mercetia Bakkendorf, 1965; Metaprionomitus Mercet, 1921; Mirocerus Ashmead, 1904; Neanagyrus Girault, 1915; Ooencyrtus (Ooencyrtoides) Hoffer, 1963; Propsyllaephagus Ev. Blanchard in De Santis, 1964; Psyllencyrtus Tachikawa, 1955; Shakespearia Girault, 1928

= Psyllaephagus =

Genus of wasps

Psyllaephagus is a genus of chalcid wasps. It was named and circumscribed by William Harris Ashmead in 1900. As of 2019, Psyllaephagus contains approximately 245 species. They are found worldwide: Australia has 100 described species; the Palaearctic region has about 57 species, India has about 20, and Africa about 30.

== Description ==
=== Female ===
Body length 0.8–3.0 mm, usually between 1.2 and 2.0 mm; usually metallic green or blue-green in colour; mandible usually with two teeth and a large straight dorsal truncation; Antenna 11-segmented; funicle 6-segmented; clava often 3-segmented; fore-wing fully developed, often hyaline, rarely with a smoky spot under marginal vein and stigmal vein; marginal vein usually punctiform (submarginal vein only meeting margin at the point where stigmal vein branches) or slightly longer than wide; marginal and postmarginal veins are both usually shorter than stigmal vein; mesopleuron in side view clearly separated from base of metasoma by propodeum; mid-tibia spur usually shorter than basitarsus; hypopygium very rarely reaching apex of metasoma; ovipositor usually hidden, but may be slightly to strongly exserted at gastral apex.

=== Male ===
Similar to female except for antennae and genitalia: the funicle varies from whiplike with long setae to flattened with short setae; clava entire.

== Biology and biological control ==
Most of the Psyllaephagus species are primary parasitoids of psylloids (Hemiptera: Psylloidea). Three species from Australia have been successfully utilized for biological control of psylloids: Psyllaephagus pilosus was introduced and released in California and European countries for the purpose of controlling Ctenarytaina eucalypti; Psyllaephagus bliteus was introduced and released in California to regulate Glycaspis brimblecombei; and Psyllaephagus yaseeni was introduced into Hawaii and south-east Asia in order to manage Heteropsylla cubana.
