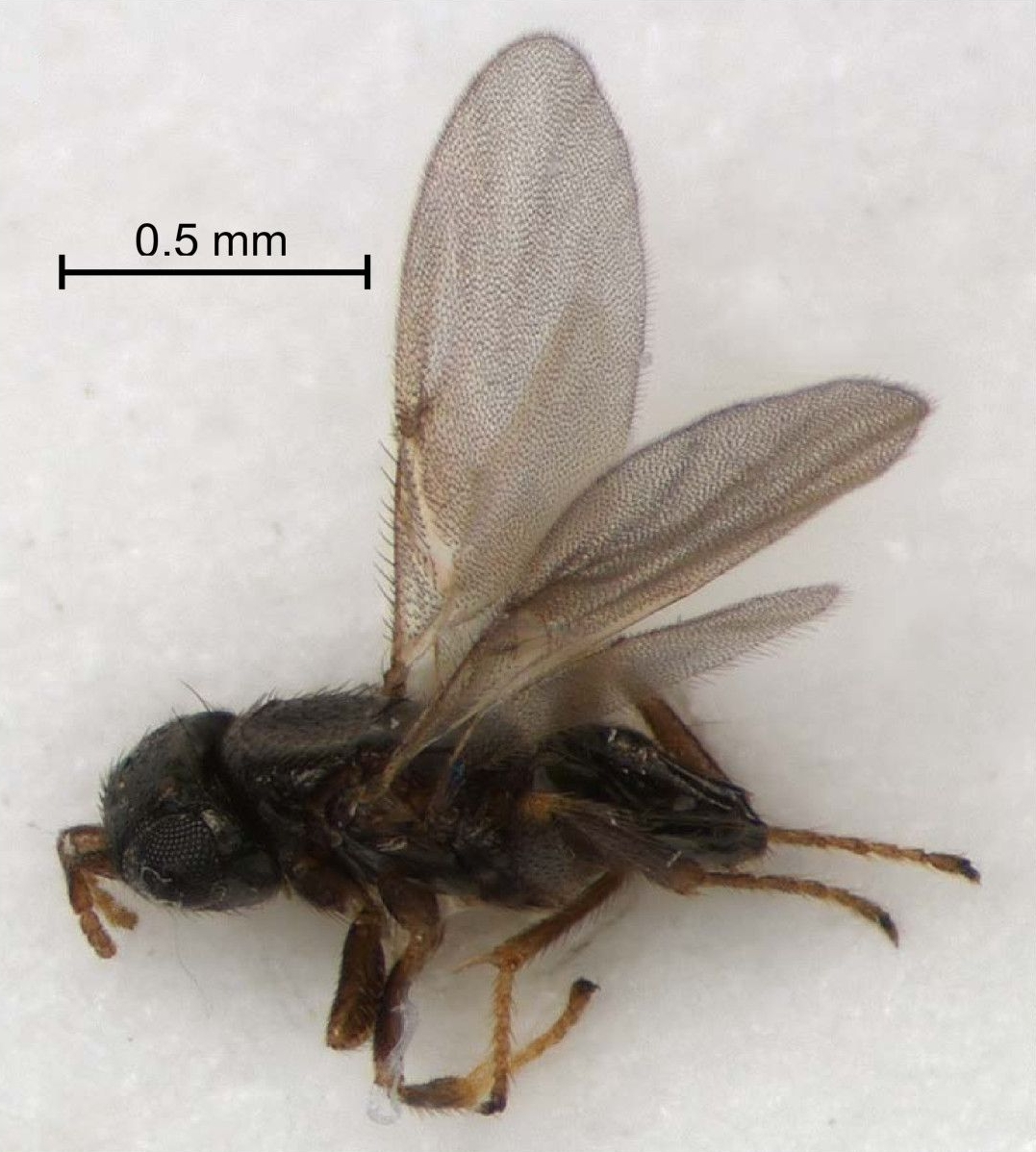
- Adult hatched from a nymph of Ixodes ricinus

Scientific classification
- Kingdom: Animalia
- Phylum: Arthropoda
- Clade: Pancrustacea
- Class: Insecta
- Order: Hymenoptera
- Family: Encyrtidae
- Genus: Ixodiphagus
- Species: I. hookeri

Binomial name
- Ixodiphagus hookeri (Howard, 1908)

Synonyms
- Habrolepis caniphila Risbec, 1951; Hunterellus hookeri Howard, 1908; Ixodiphagus caniphila Risbec, 1951; Ixodiphagus caucurtei Buysson, 1912

= Ixodiphagus hookeri =

Species of wasp

Ixodiphagus hookeri, the tick wasp, is an encyrtid wasp which lays its eggs into ticks. It seems to use a symbiotic bacteria, Wolbachia pipientis, to weaken the tick's immune system.

== Description ==
Ixodiphagus hookeri is a small wasp which has the typical morphology of an encyrtid wasp and is blackish in colour, it measures 0.8-0.9mm in length and has a wing length span of 1.5mm. Its head is dorsally flattened with very large compound eyes. In females, the antennae have eleven segments and the antennae are club shaped; while in males they have ten segments and are thread-like.

== Biology ==
Ixodiphagus hookeri has a short flight period in the summer in Europe. The female normally oviposits an egg into the body of an unfed nymph of Ixodes ricinus, but has been recorded ovipositing in the adults of Rhipicephalus sanguineus. The egg remains in diapause until the nymph engorges on vertebrate blood, at which point the egg becomes active. Some eggs are not successful, as the tick's immune system can encapsulate the egg, which results in the egg becoming melanised and dying. The bacteria Wolbachia is symbiotic with the wasp, and its presence in ticks is a possible indicator of infestation by tick wasps; Wolbachia may have a role in suppressing the host's immune system response to the wasp. The wasp larvae then exist as koinobiont parasitoids in the tick for 28 to 70 days before emerging.

Ticks from the genera Ornithodoros, Amblyomma, Dermacentor, Haemaphysalis, Hyalomma, Ixodes and Rhipicephalus are recorded as having been infected by I. hookeri. In Europe, Ixodes ricinus appears to be the preferred species and the marsh tick Dermacentor reticulatus is not used as a host. Because of the potential importance of I. hookeri as a natural enemy of ticks, it has been extensively researched. Different populations of I. hookeri around the world show different host preferences, complicating attempts to use this species as a biological control for ticks.

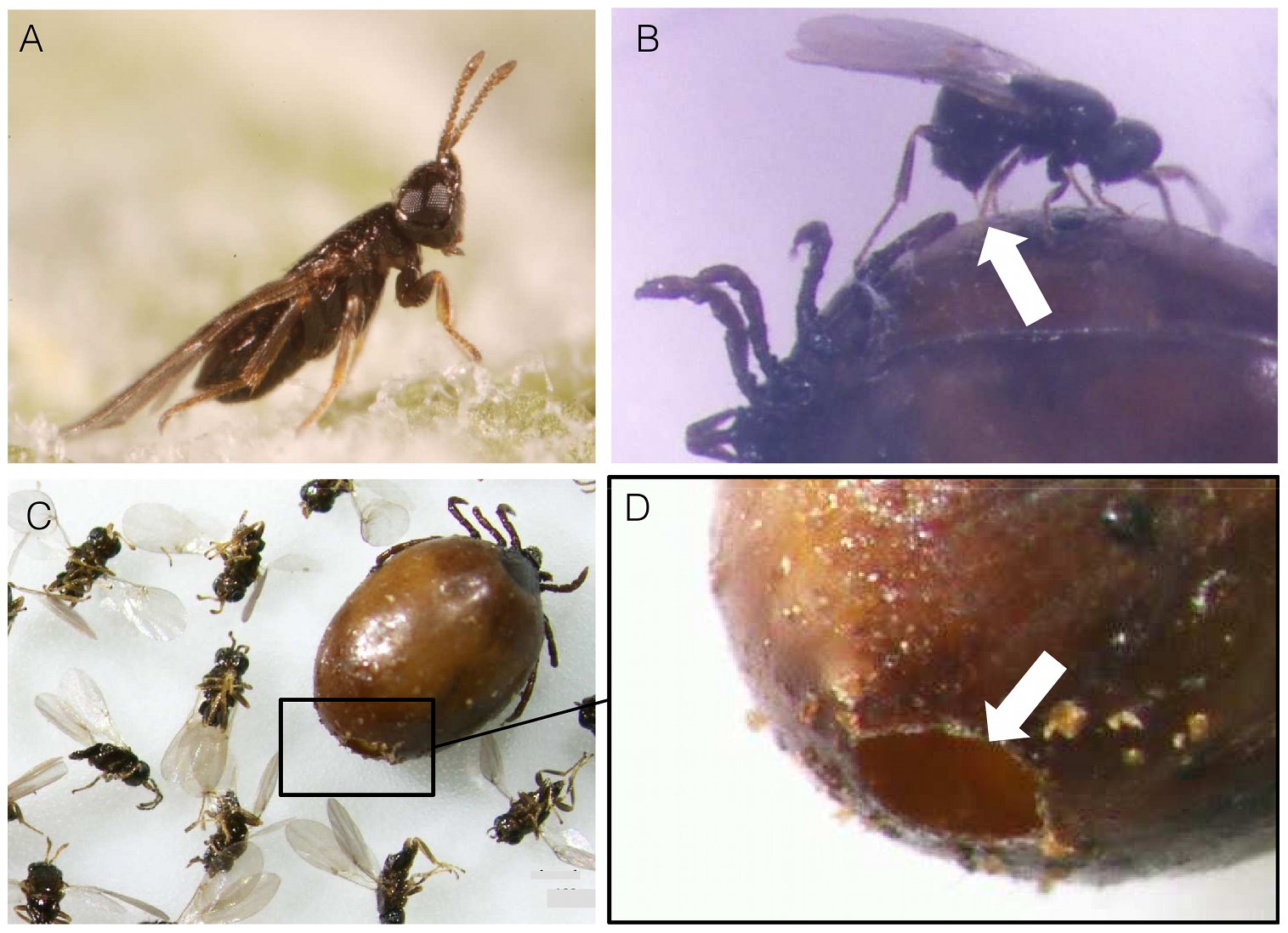
A Female habitus. B Female ovipositing in an engorged nymph of Ixodes ricinus (ovipositor indicated by the arrow). C Adults of I. hookeri around the dead body of an engorged nymph of I. ricinus. D Emergence hole from which parasitoids exit the dead body of the engorged nymph.

== Distribution ==
I. hookeri occurs worldwide, except in Antarctica.
