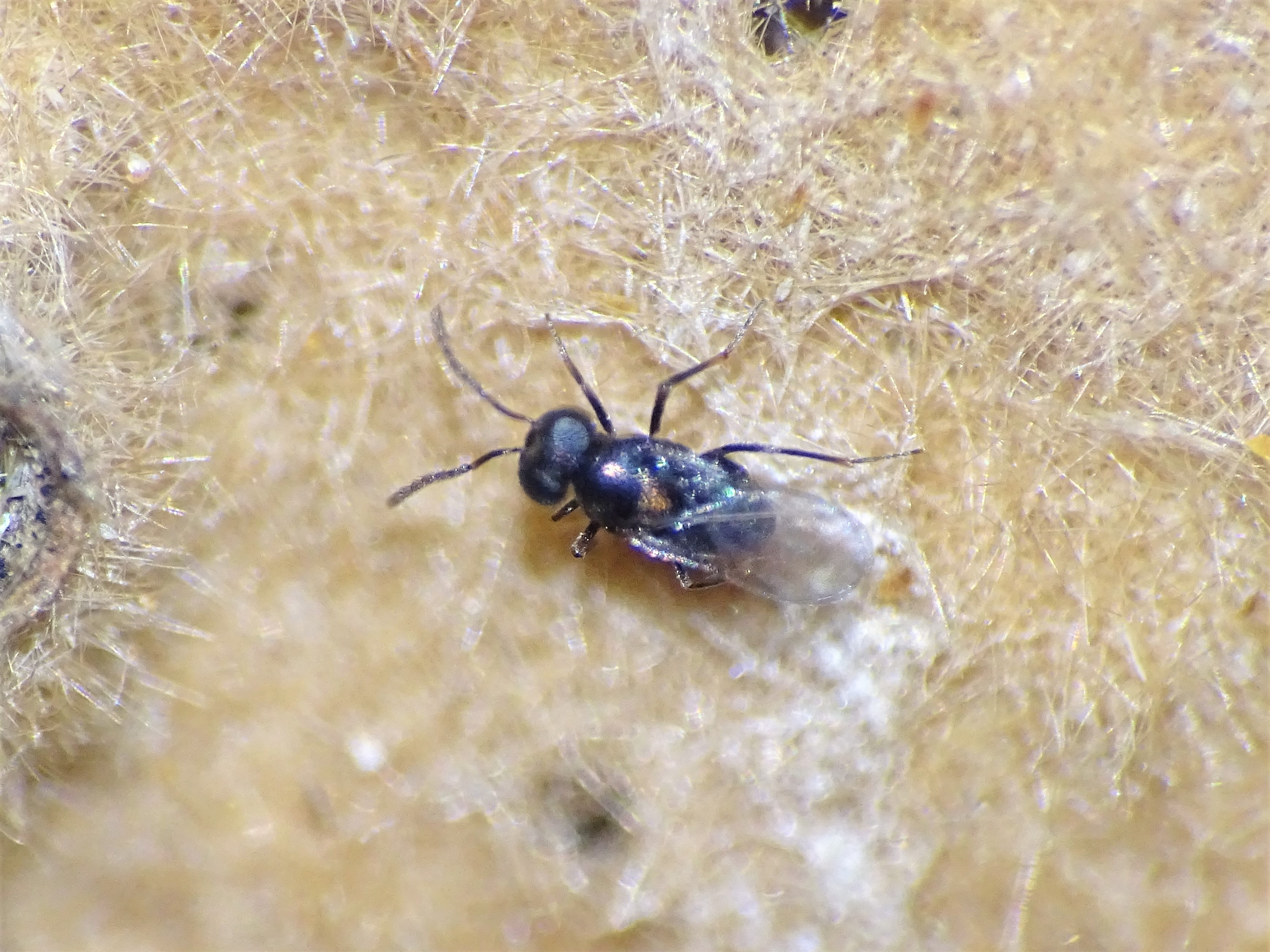
- Adult Ooencyrtus kuvanae on spongy moth egg mass.

Scientific classification
- Domain: Eukaryota
- Kingdom: Animalia
- Phylum: Arthropoda
- Class: Insecta
- Order: Hymenoptera
- Family: Encyrtidae
- Genus: Ooencyrtus
- Species: O. kuvanae

Binomial name
- Ooencyrtus kuvanae (Howard 1910)

= Ooencyrtus kuvanae =

Species of chalcid wasp

Ooencyrtus kuvanae is a species of chalcid wasp. It was introduced to North America in 1908 to control Lymantria moths. In North America, it has become an active parasitoid of the invasive spotted lanternfly.
