= Anagyrus lopezi =

Scientific classification
- Domain: Eukaryota
- Kingdom: Animalia
- Phylum: Arthropoda
- Class: Insecta
- Order: Hymenoptera
- Family: Encyrtidae
- Genus: Anagyrus
- Species: A. lopezi

Binomial name
- Anagyrus lopezi De Santis, 1964

Synonyms
- Epidinocarsis lopezi, Apoanagyrus lopezi (De Santis, 1964)

Species of wasp

Anagyrus lopezi is a species of parasitic wasp native to Central America. It is used as biological control agent against the cassava mealybug (Phenacoccus manihoti).

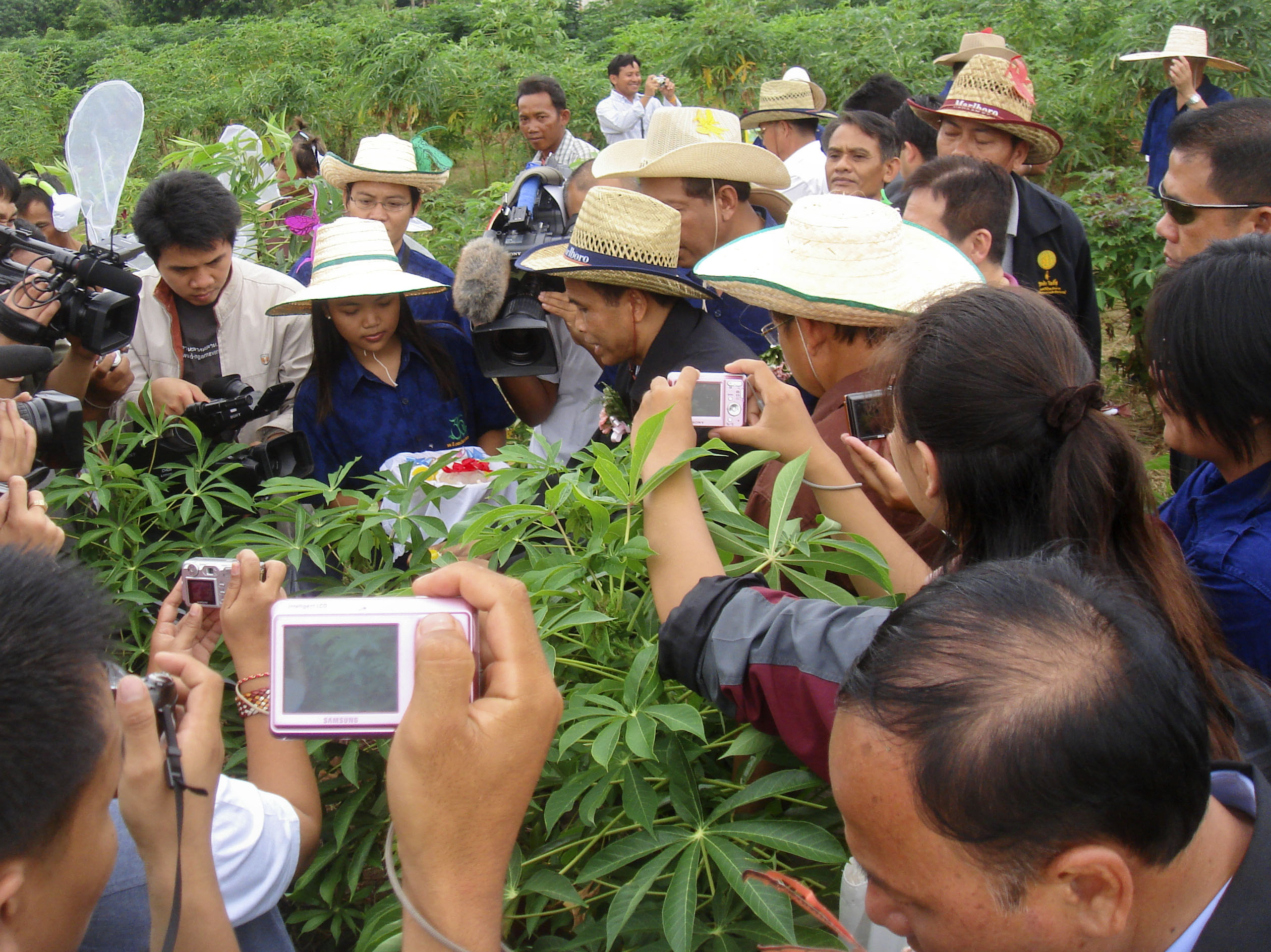
The release of the parasitic wasp Anagyrus Lopezi, at a ceremony organised and hosted by the Thai Department of Agriculture in the country's northeastern Khon Kaen province.

Large-scale deployment of this parasitoid was done in Africa and was successfully achieved in Thailand and several other Southeast Asian countries in 2010.

In 2010, a large number of wasps were airdropped into Thailand to control mealy bug.

In 1980, wasps were used to control mealy bug in cassava fields of west Africa and reduce the pest population by 80–90%.
