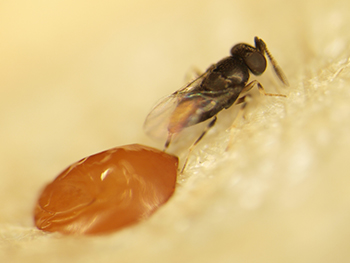
- Oobius agrili adult laying an egg within an emerald ash borer egg.

Scientific classification
- Domain: Eukaryota
- Kingdom: Animalia
- Phylum: Arthropoda
- Class: Insecta
- Order: Hymenoptera
- Family: Encyrtidae
- Subfamily: Encyrtinae
- Genus: Oobius; Trjapitzin 1963

Type species
- Tyndarichus rudnevi Nowicki by original designation

Species
- See text

= Oobius =

Genus of wasps

Oobius is a parasitic non-stinging wasp genus in the family Encyrtidae.

== Species ==
- Oobius agrili
- Oobius batocerae
- Oobius buprestidis
- Oobius dahlsteni
- Oobius depressus
- Oobius longoi
- Oobius minusculus
- Oobius nearcticus
- Oobius whiteorum

== See also ==
- List of encyrtid genera
