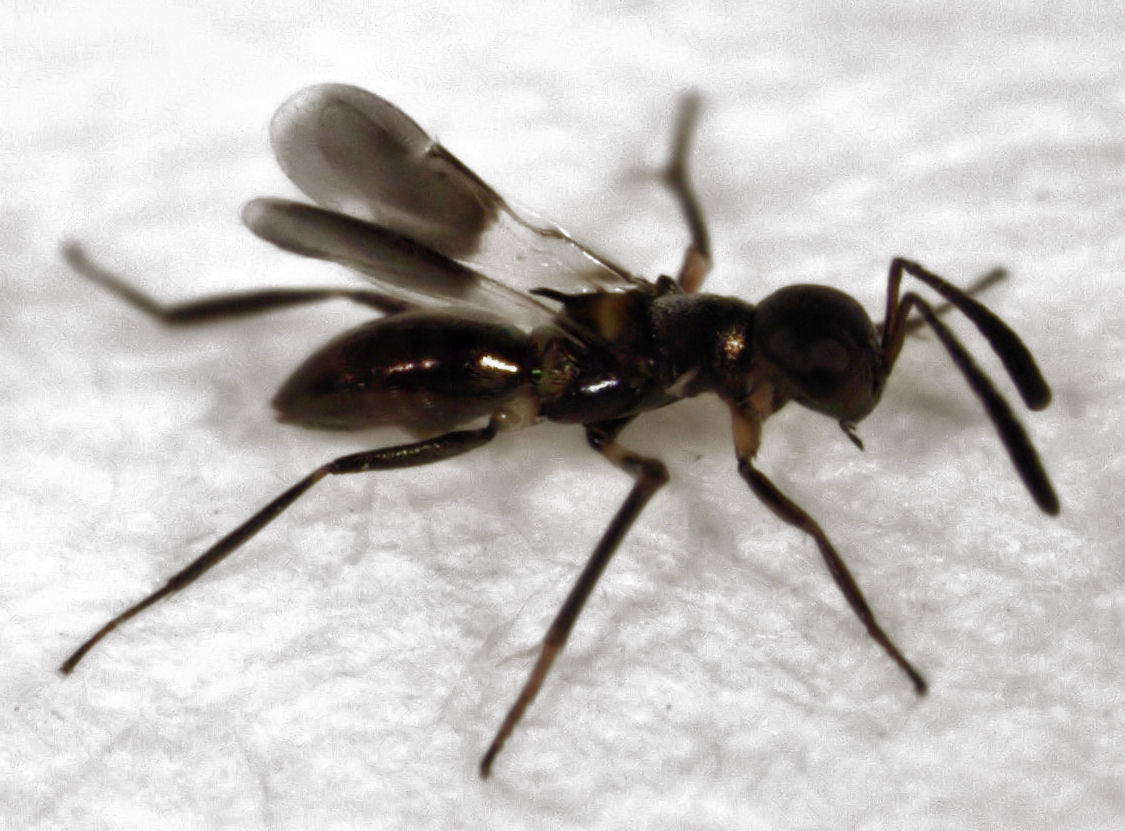
- Cheiloneurus flaccus

Scientific classification
- Domain: Eukaryota
- Kingdom: Animalia
- Phylum: Arthropoda
- Class: Insecta
- Order: Hymenoptera
- Family: Encyrtidae
- Subfamily: Encyrtinae
- Genus: Cheiloneurus; Westwood 1833; Lond. & Edinb. phil. Mag., (3) 3 (17), 343.

Type species
- Cheiloneurus elegans Dalman, 1820

Species
- See text

Synonyms
- Aulonops; Bekilyia; Blatticida; Chrysopophagoides; Chrysopophagus; Cristatithorax; Echthrogonatopus; Epicheiloneurus; Eusemionopsis; Saronotum; Tobiasia...

= Cheiloneurus =

Genus of wasps

Cheiloneurus is a parasitic wasp genus in the family Encyrtidae.

== Species ==
- Cheiloneurus afer
- Cheiloneurus alaskae
- Cheiloneurus albicornis
- Cheiloneurus albinotatus
- Cheiloneurus angulatus
- Cheiloneurus angustifrons
- Cheiloneurus annulicornis
- Cheiloneurus antipodis
- Cheiloneurus apeniculus
- Cheiloneurus argentifer
- Cheiloneurus assamensis
- Cheiloneurus axillaris
- Cheiloneurus bangalorensis
- Cheiloneurus banksi
- Cheiloneurus basiri
- Cheiloneurus beerwahi
- Cheiloneurus bifasciatus
- Cheiloneurus bimaculatus
- Cheiloneurus boldyrevi
- Cheiloneurus bonariensis
- Cheiloneurus bouceki
- Cheiloneurus brunneipes
- Cheiloneurus burnsi
- Cheiloneurus caesar
- Cheiloneurus callidus
- Cheiloneurus carinatus
- Cheiloneurus ceroplastis
- Cheiloneurus cheles
- Cheiloneurus chiaromontei
- Cheiloneurus chinensis
- Cheiloneurus chlorodryini
- Cheiloneurus chrysopae
- Cheiloneurus cinctiventris
- Cheiloneurus claviger
- Cheiloneurus coimbatorensis
- Cheiloneurus compressicornis
- Cheiloneurus cristatus
- Cheiloneurus cushmani
- Cheiloneurus cyanonotus
- Cheiloneurus daghestanicus
- Cheiloneurus diversicolor
- Cheiloneurus divinus
- Cheiloneurus dubius
- Cheiloneurus dumasi
- Cheiloneurus elcielo
- Cheiloneurus elegans
- Cheiloneurus exitiosus
- Cheiloneurus flaccus
- Cheiloneurus flavipes
- Cheiloneurus flaviscutellum
- Cheiloneurus flavoscutatus
- Cheiloneurus fulvescens
- Cheiloneurus gahani
- Cheiloneurus giraulti
- Cheiloneurus glaphyra
- Cheiloneurus gonatopodis
- Cheiloneurus hadrodorys
- Cheiloneurus hawaiicus
- Cheiloneurus hawaiiensis
- Cheiloneurus hemipterus
- Cheiloneurus hugoi
- Cheiloneurus inimicus
- Cheiloneurus izhevskyi
- Cheiloneurus japonicus
- Cheiloneurus javanus
- Cheiloneurus javensis
- Cheiloneurus kanagawaensis
- Cheiloneurus kansensis
- Cheiloneurus kerrichi
- Cheiloneurus kollari
- Cheiloneurus kuisebi
- Cheiloneurus lakhimpurensis
- Cheiloneurus lateocaudatus
- Cheiloneurus latifrons
- Cheiloneurus latiscapus
- Cheiloneurus leptulus
- Cheiloneurus lineascapus
- Cheiloneurus liorhipnusi
- Cheiloneurus longicornis
- Cheiloneurus longipennis
- Cheiloneurus longiventris
- Cheiloneurus loretanus
- Cheiloneurus malayensis
- Cheiloneurus manipurensis
- Cheiloneurus margiscutellum
- Cheiloneurus marilandia (Girault, 1917)
- Cheiloneurus matsuyamensis
- Cheiloneurus mazzinini
- Cheiloneurus metallicus
- Cheiloneurus molokaiensis
- Cheiloneurus morozkoi
- Cheiloneurus neparvus
- Cheiloneurus nigrescens
- Cheiloneurus nigricornis
- Cheiloneurus nitidulus
- Cheiloneurus novimandibularis
- Cheiloneurus noxius
- Cheiloneurus noyesi
- Cheiloneurus oahuensis
- Cheiloneurus obscurus
- Cheiloneurus olmii
- Cheiloneurus orbitalis
- Cheiloneurus pachycephalus
- Cheiloneurus paralia
- Cheiloneurus parvus
- Cheiloneurus pasteuri
- Cheiloneurus peniculoartus
- Cheiloneurus perbellus
- Cheiloneurus perpulcher
- Cheiloneurus phenacocci
- Cheiloneurus pistaciae
- Cheiloneurus praenitens
- Cheiloneurus pulcher
- Cheiloneurus pulvinariae
- Cheiloneurus purpureicinctus
- Cheiloneurus purpureiventris
- Cheiloneurus pyrillae
- Cheiloneurus quadricolor
- Cheiloneurus quercus
- Cheiloneurus rarus
- Cheiloneurus reate
- Cheiloneurus rediculus
- Cheiloneurus regis
- Cheiloneurus saissetiae
- Cheiloneurus seminigriclavus
- Cheiloneurus sinensis
- Cheiloneurus submuticus
- Cheiloneurus swezeyi
- Cheiloneurus tainus
- Cheiloneurus tenuicornis
- Cheiloneurus tenuistigma
- Cheiloneurus triguttatipennis
- Cheiloneurus udaghamundus
- Cheiloneurus unicolor
- Cheiloneurus vanpoetereni
- Cheiloneurus victor
- Cheiloneurus viridiscutum
- Cheiloneurus vulcanus
- Cheiloneurus westwoodi
- Cheiloneurus zeyai

== See also ==
- List of encyrtid genera
