= Archencyrtus =

Archencyrtus Temporal range: Middle Eocene

Scientific classification
- Kingdom: Animalia
- Phylum: Arthropoda
- Class: Insecta
- Order: Hymenoptera
- Family: Encyrtidae
- Subfamily: incertae sedis
- Genus: †Archencyrtus; Simutnik, 2014
- Species: †A. rasnitsyni

Binomial name
- †Archencyrtus rasnitsyni Simutnik, 2014

Extinct genus of wasps

Archencyrtus is an extinct genus of wasp in the Chalcidoidea family Encyrtidae. The genus contains a single described species, Archencyrtus rasnitsyni known from a Middle Eocene fossil that was found in Eastern Asia.

== History and classification ==
When first described, Archencyrtus was known from a single fossil insect included in a transparent chunk of Sakhalin amber. While being studied the fossil was part of the amber collections housed in the Paleontological Institute, Russian Academy of Sciences. Sakhalin amber is recovered from fossil bearing rocks in the Sakhalin region of Eastern Russia. At the time of description the amber, which originates from the Lower Due Formation, was estimated to be of Middle Eocene age. The amber fossil specimen was first studied by paleoentomologist S. A. Simutnik of the Russian Academy of Sciences, with his 2014 type description for the genus and species being published in the Paleontologicheskii Zhurnal. The genus name was coined as a combination of the Encyrtidae genus name Encyrtus, and the Greek word archaios that translates as "ancient". The species name is a patronym that was chosen to honor the Russian paleoentomologist Alexandr Rasnitsyn.

Among the features distinguishing Archencyrtus from other genera is the antennae with five funicular segments, the other described fossil Encyrtidae genera have four segments, while the major portion of the living genera have six segments.

== Description ==
In females of A. rasnitsyni the head has a rounded rear margin and the mouth is shifted under the lower edge. The antennae have a pedicel, five segments and a apical club formed from three to four additional segments. The first three segments after the pedicel are ring shaped and very small while the next two are larger. Unlike some other members of Encyrtidae, A. rasnitsyni has a body that is elongated rather than flattened. The metasoma is a little longer than the mesosoma, but details of the body are not discernible due to the preservation conditions of the amber. The transparent wings are long, with the tips reaching notably farther back than the abdomen tip. There is an elongate setae free section on the wing, the linea calva, which is bordered on the basal side by long setae. The wing setae also from a short fringe along the margin of the forewings. The legs show spurs present on the protibia and mesotibia, while the tarsi have five segments each.
