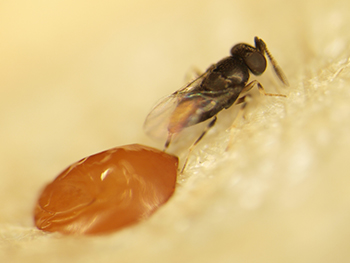
- Oobius agrili adult laying an egg within an emerald ash borer egg.

Scientific classification
- Domain: Eukaryota
- Kingdom: Animalia
- Phylum: Arthropoda
- Class: Insecta
- Order: Hymenoptera
- Family: Encyrtidae
- Genus: Oobius
- Species: O. agrili

Binomial name
- Oobius agrili Zhang and Huang 2005

= Oobius agrili =

Species of wasp

Oobius agrili is a parasitic non-stinging wasp of family Encyrtidae which is native to North Asia. It is a parasitoid of the emerald ash borer (Agrilus planipennis Fairmaire, family Buprestidae), an invasive species which has destroyed tens of millions of ash trees in its introduced range in North America. As part of the campaign against the emerald ash borer (EAB), American scientists in conjunction with the Chinese Academy of Forestry searched since 2003 for its natural enemies in the wild leading to the discovery of several parasitoid wasps, including Oobius agrili, which is a solitary egg parasitoid of EAB found on ash trees in Jilin province in 2004; it has been recorded to kill up to 60 percent of EAB eggs.

Field studies were carried out in 2005 which revealed that Oobius agrili completes at least two generations per year. The peak period for parasitism was during July and August where egg parasitism rates were 56.3 percent and 61.5 percent, respectively. O. agrili is parthenogenic and has a sex ratio of 14.5:1 (female:male). O. agrili achieves synchrony with its host life cycle—part of the O. agrili larvae population in eggs of EAB undergoes diapause within the eggs during winter and emerges the following summer.

The USDA carried out paired choice assays with eggs of six different native Agrilus species, two cerambycid beetles, and four lepidopterans. O. agrili ignored eggs of all other species except of three of the Agrilus species of egg size in the same range as that of EAB. O. agrili strongly preferred to oviposit in EAB eggs laid on ash than in eggs of other Agrilus species on their respective host plants. The selectivity shown by O. agrili has led to its being included in the biological control program for controlled releases in selected sites for further research.
