= Schilleriella =

Schilleriella may refer to:

- Schilleriella (wasp), a genus of wasps in the family Encyrtidae
- Schilleriella (alga), a genus of algae in the family Pleurochloridaceae
