= Helygia =

Helygia may refer to:

- a synonym for Parsonsia, a genus of woody vines of the family Apocynaceae
- Helygia (wasp), an insect genus in the subfamily Encyrtinae
