= Cheiloneurus elegans =

Scientific classification
- Kingdom: Animalia
- Phylum: Arthropoda
- Class: Insecta
- Order: Hymenoptera
- Family: Encyrtidae
- Genus: Cheiloneurus
- Species: C. elegans

Binomial name
- Cheiloneurus elegans (Dalman, 1820)

Synonyms
- Cheiloneurus elegantissimus; Cleonymus elegans (Dalman, 1820); Encyrtus elegans

Species of wasp

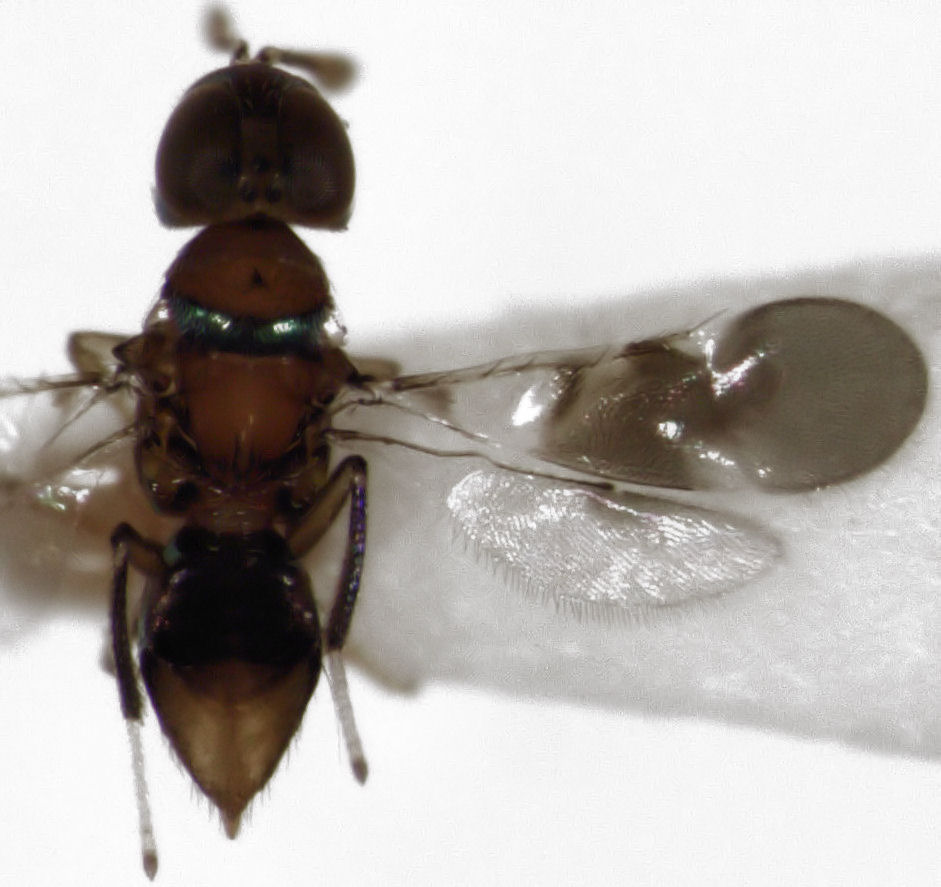

Cheiloneurus elegans is a parasitic wasp species in the genus Cheiloneurus.

Its EPPO code is CHEUEL.

The host for this wasp is Contarinia larvae found inside galls.
