= Satureia =

Satureia may refer to:

- Satureia (wasp), a wasp genus in the subfamily Encyrtinae
- an older spelling of Satureja, a plant genus, when it was in Labiatae rather than Lamiaceae
