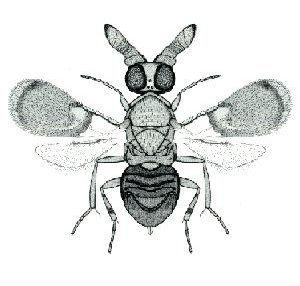
- Anicetus communis
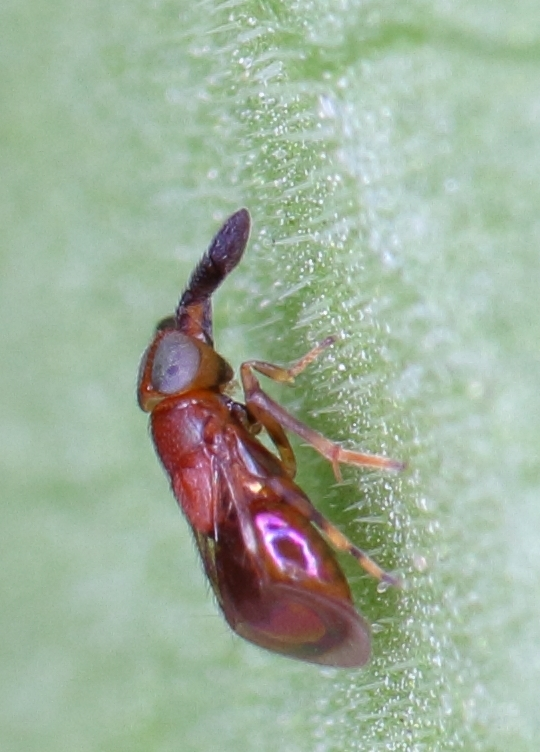
- Anicetus sp.

Scientific classification
- Kingdom: Animalia
- Phylum: Arthropoda
- Clade: Pancrustacea
- Class: Insecta
- Order: Hymenoptera
- Superfamily: Chalcidoidea
- Family: Encyrtidae
- Subfamily: Encyrtinae
- Genus: Anicetus; Howard, 1896

Type species
- Anicetus ceylonensis Howard, 1896

Species
- See text

= Anicetus (wasp) =

Genus of wasps

Anicetus is a genus of small, parasitic wasps with a cosmopolitan distribution. There are about 50 species, with the greatest diversity in the tropical parts of the Old World. They are primary endoparasitoids, primarily targeting wax scale and soft scale insects (Coccidae).

== Etymology ==
The genus was named after Anicetus, the bishop of Rome from c. 157 CE to his death in April 168 CE.

== Biology ==
They are highly specialized, with many species displaying strict host specificity to particular species of scale insects. Some of these scale insects are economically significant pests of important horticultural crops, including citrus, coffee, guava, papaya, mulberry, and mango trees. Because they are capable of controlling scale insect populations in citrus orchards, some Anicetus species were introduced to Australia.

== Species ==
- Anicetus abyssinicus Annecke, 1967
- Anicetus africanus (Girault, 1920)
- Anicetus aligarhensis Hayat, Alam & Agarwal, 1975
- Anicetus angustus Hayat, Alam & Agarwal, 1975
- Anicetus anneckei Prinsloo & Mynhardt, 1981
- Anicetus annulatus Timberlake, 1919
- Anicetus aquilus (Annecke, 1967)
- Anicetus argentinus (Fidalgo, 1979)
- Anicetus ashmeadi Hayat, Alam & Agarwal, 1975
- Anicetus austrinus (Annecke, 1967)
- Anicetus beneficus Ishii & Yasumatsu, 1954
- Anicetus calidus (Annecke, 1967)
- Anicetus ceroplastis Ishii, 1928
- Anicetus ceroplastodis (Mani, 1935)
- Anicetus ceylonensis Howard, 1896
- Anicetus chinensis Girault, 1916
- Anicetus clivus (Annecke, 1967)
- Anicetus communis Annecke, 1967
- Anicetus deltoideus Annecke, 1967
- Anicetus dodonia Ferrière, 1935
- Anicetus eous Trjapitzin, 1965
- Anicetus felix (Girault, 1915)
- Anicetus fotsyae Risbec, 1959
- Anicetus fuscus Annecke, 1967
- Anicetus graminosus Annecke, 1967
- Anicetus howardi Hayat, Alam & Agarwal, 1975
- Anicetus inglisiae Hayat, 2003
- Anicetus integrellus Trjapitzin, 1962
- Anicetus italicus (Masi, 1917)
- Anicetus korotyaevi Sugonjaev, 2005
- Anicetus mirabilis (Girault, 1921)
- Anicetus myartsevae Trjapitzin & Ruíz Cancino, 2009
- Anicetus mysterius Sugonjaev, 2005
- Anicetus nyasicus (Compere, 1938)
- Anicetus ohgushii Tachikawa, 1958
- Anicetus parilis (Annecke, 1967)
- Anicetus parvus Compere, 1937
- Anicetus pattersoni (Waterston, 1917)
- Anicetus primus (Howard, 1898)
- Anicetus quintanai De Santis, 1964
- Anicetus rarisetus Xu & He, 1997
- Anicetus rubensi Xu & He, 1997
- Anicetus russeus (Annecke, 1967)
- Anicetus sepis (Annecke, 1967)
- Anicetus stylatus Subba Rao, 1977
- Anicetus taylori (Annecke, 1967)
- Anicetus thanhi Sugonjaev, 2005
- Anicetus thymi Sharkov, 1988
- Anicetus toumeyellae Milliron, 1959
- Anicetus villarreali Trjapitzin & Ruíz Cancino, 2009
- Anicetus zhejiangensis Xu & Li, 1991

== See also ==
- List of encyrtid genera
