= Moorella (wasp) =

Scientific classification
- Kingdom: Animalia
- Phylum: Arthropoda
- Clade: Pancrustacea
- Class: Insecta
- Order: Hymenoptera
- Family: Encyrtidae
- Subfamily: Encyrtinae
- Genus: Moorella; Cameron, 1913

Type species
- Moorella fulviceps Cameron, 1913

Genus of wasps

Moorella is a genus of parasitoid wasps belonging to the family Encyrtidae within the superfamilia Chalcidoidea, in the order Hymenoptera.

The following species of neotropical insects are included in this genus:

- Moorella alini Trjapitzin and Triapitsyn, 2015
- Moorella compressiventris Timberlake, 1925
- Moorella fulviceps Cameron, 1913 (type species of this genus)
- Moorella irwini Triapitsyn and Trjapitzin, 2015
- Moorella latipes Girault, 1913
- Moorella zuparkoi Triapitsyn and Trjapitzin, 2015
