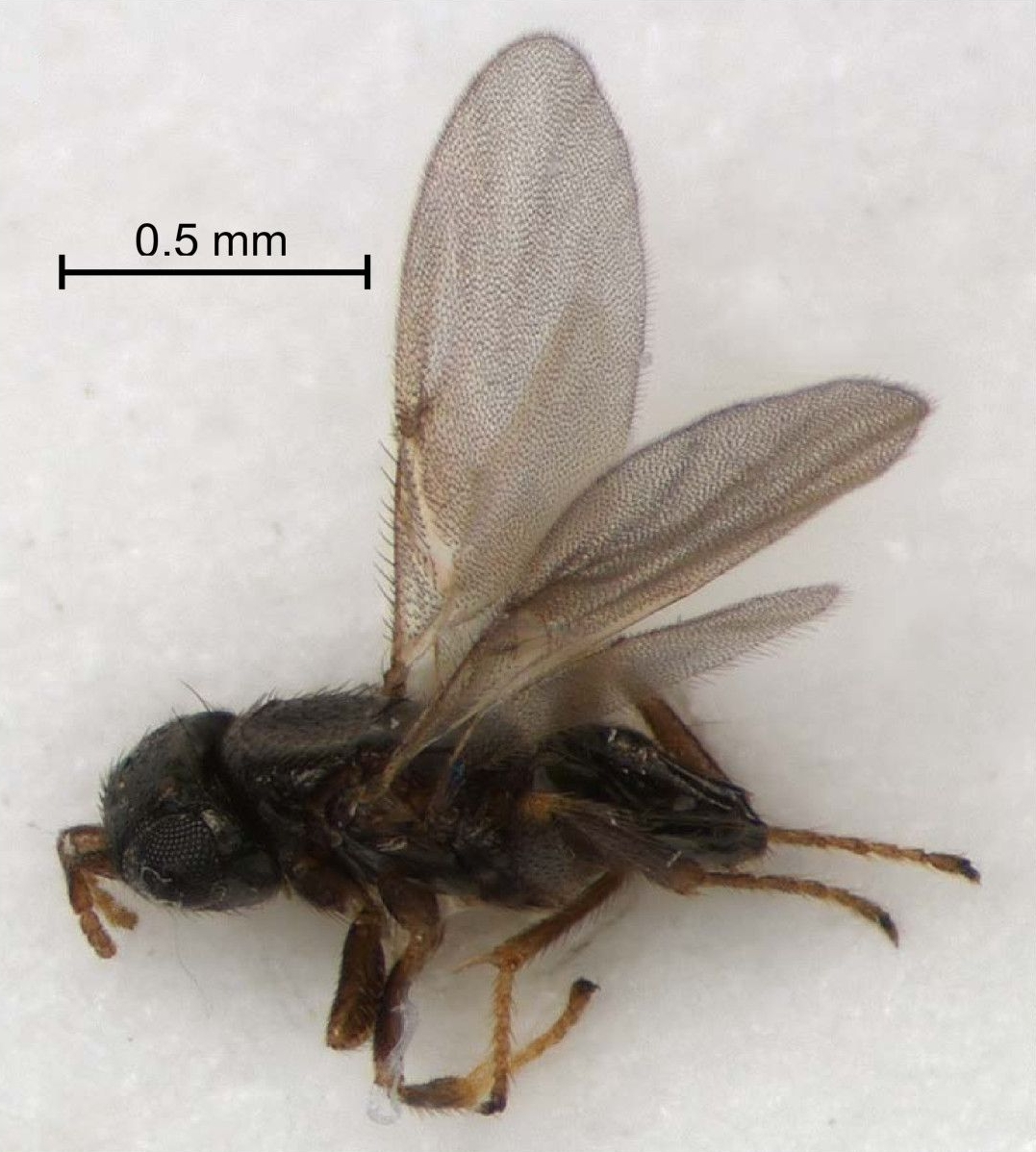
- Adult Ixodiphagus hookeri wasp emerged from Ixodes ricinus nymph. Photo by Oscar Vorst, CC BY 2.0, via Wikimedia Commons.

Scientific classification
- Kingdom: Animalia
- Phylum: Arthropoda
- Clade: Pancrustacea
- Class: Insecta
- Order: Hymenoptera
- Family: Encyrtidae
- Subfamily: Encyrtinae
- Genus: Ixodiphagus; Howard, 1907

Type species
- Ixodiphagus texanus Howard, 1907

Synonyms
- Australzaomma Girault, 1925 * Hunterellus Howard, 1908

= Ixodiphagus =

Genus of parasitoid wasps that attack ticks

Ixodiphagus is a genus of encyrtid wasps (order Hymenoptera, superfamily Chalcidoidea) that are obligate parasitoids of ticks (order Ixodida). Females oviposit into larval or nymphal ticks; development resumes inside the nymph and the emerging adult wasps kill the host. Because of this unique biology, Ixodiphagus has been repeatedly investigated as a biological control agent for medically and veterinary important ticks.

== History and taxonomy ==
The genus was erected by Leland Ossian Howard in 1907 for I. texanus collected from rabbit ticks in Texas, USA. Howard (1908) described Hunterellus hookeri, later transferred to Ixodiphagus. Additional names proposed for tick‑parasitoid encyrtids (e.g. Australzaomma Girault, 1925) are now treated as junior synonyms of Ixodiphagus. The genus is placed in subfamily Encyrtinae within Encyrtidae.

== Species ==
Comprehensive modern reviews recognise ~10–11 valid species worldwide. The following have been described (authorities and years shown):

- Ixodiphagus aethes Hayat & Veenakumari, 2015
- Ixodiphagus biroi Erdős, 1956
- Ixodiphagus brunneus (Girault, 1925)
- Ixodiphagus hirtus Nikol'skaya, 1950
- Ixodiphagus hookeri (Howard, 1908)
- Ixodiphagus mysorensis Mani, 1941
- Ixodiphagus sagarensis (Geevarghese, 1977)
- Ixodiphagus sureshani Hayat & Islam, 2011
- Ixodiphagus taiaroaensis Heath & Cane, 2010
- Ixodiphagus texanus Howard, 1907 – type species
- Ixodiphagus theilerae (Fiedler, 1953)

== Morphology ==
Adults are minute (≈1–2 mm) chalcidoid wasps with the typical encyrtid body plan. Diagnostic characters include a 5‑segmented maxillary palp and genae without malar sulcus, but species‑level identification relies on male genitalia, antennal segmentation and sculpture of the mesosoma and gaster.

== Biology and life cycle ==
Females usually oviposit into engorged larvae or unfed/engorged nymphs of ticks. Eggs deposited in larvae remain quiescent until the host molts to the nymphal stage, after which embryogenesis and larval development proceed. Multiple eggs may be laid per tick. Emergence of adults commonly occurs 30–60 days after the parasitized nymph feeds and detaches.

== Host range and ecology ==
Ixodiphagus spp. have been recorded from at least seven tick genera across both hard ticks (Ixodidae) and soft ticks (Argasidae), including Ixodes, Rhipicephalus, Amblyomma, Dermacentor, Haemaphysalis, Hyalomma and Ornithodoros.

== Distribution ==
The genus is near‑global in distribution, mirroring the ranges of its tick hosts. Records exist from North America, Central and South America, Europe, Africa, Asia and Oceania, including island systems such as New Zealand where I. taiaroaensis was described from seabird tick colonies.

== Use in biological control ==
Interest in deploying Ixodiphagus for biocontrol of ticks dates to the early 20th century. Controlled releases and lab–field programs have produced mixed outcomes: in a Kenyan trial targeting Amblyomma variegatum, releases of ~150,000 I. hookeri substantially reduced the target tick but did not affect co‑occurring Rhipicephalus appendiculatus, highlighting host specificity.

== See also ==
- Encyrtidae
- Chalcidoidea
