= Parachalcerinys =

Scientific classification
- Kingdom: Animalia
- Phylum: Arthropoda
- Clade: Pancrustacea
- Class: Insecta
- Order: Hymenoptera
- Family: Encyrtidae
- Subfamily: Encyrtinae
- Genus: Parachalcerinys; Girault, 1925

Type species
- Parachalcerinys nonaericornis Girault, 1925

Species
- P. coccidoxenoides Girault, 1926; P. minuta (Girault, 1928); P. nonaericornis Girault, 1925

Synonyms
- Australia Girault, 1928

Genus of wasps

Parachalcerinys is a genus of wasp. As of 2018, three species are recognized, which are all found in Australia.
