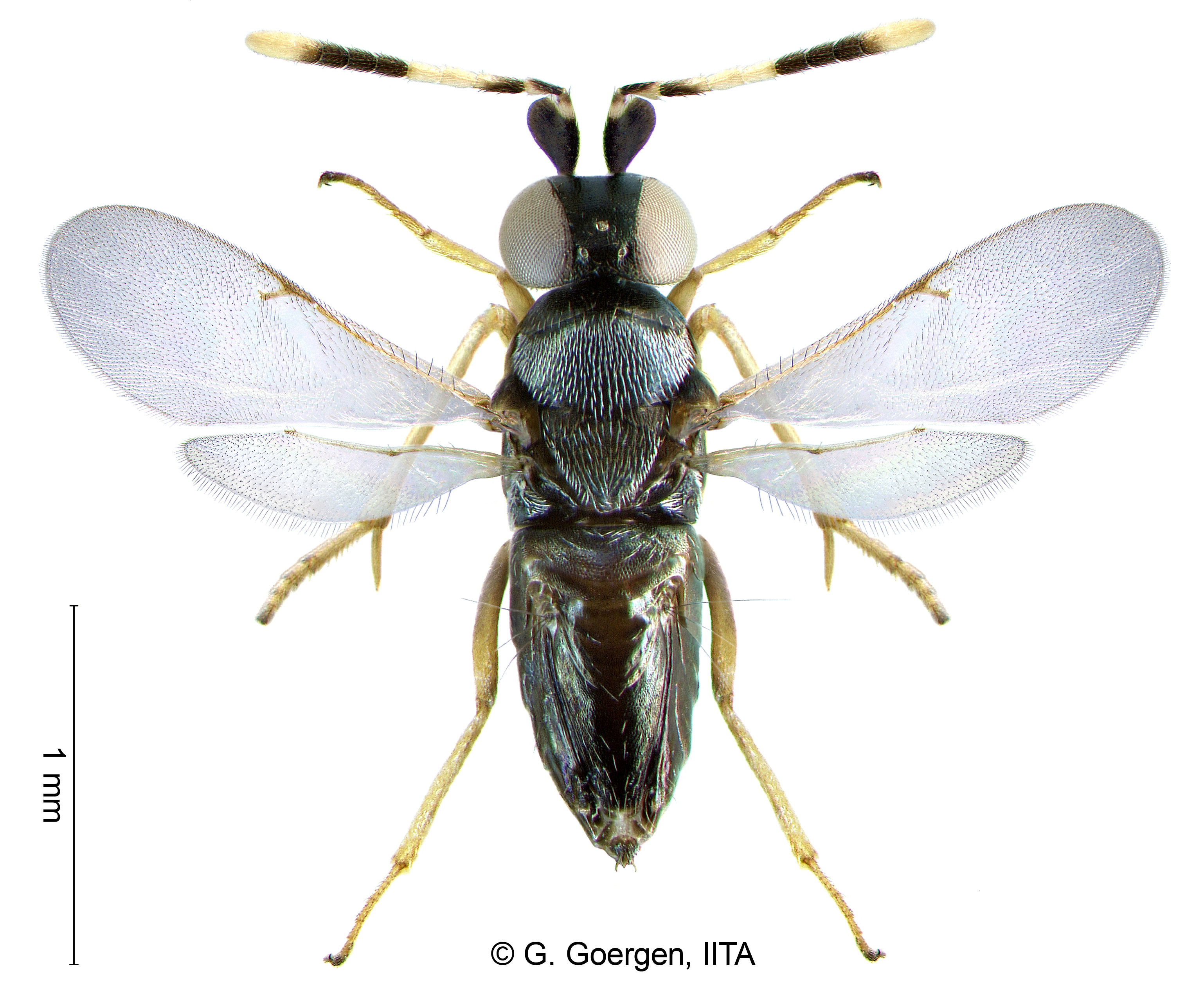

Scientific classification
- Kingdom: Animalia
- Phylum: Arthropoda
- Clade: Pancrustacea
- Class: Insecta
- Order: Hymenoptera
- Family: Encyrtidae
- Subfamily: Tetracneminae
- Genus: Anagyrus; Howard, 1896

Species
- See text

Synonyms
- Aagyrus; Aglyptoideus De Santis, 1964; Anathrix Burks, 1952; Apoanagyrus Compere, 1947; Cremesina Noyes & Hayat, 1984; Doliphoceras Mercet, 1921; Epidinocarsis Girault, 1913; Gyranusa Mercet, 1921; Gyranusia Brethes, 1921; Heterarthrellus Howard, 1898; Nesoanagyrus Beardsley, 1969; Paranusia Brethes, 1913; Philoponectroma Brethes, 1913; Protanagyrus Blanchard, 1940; Rhopomorphus Ghesquiere, 195; Tongyus Noyes & Hayat, 1984; Xiphomastix De Santis, 1972

= Anagyrus =

Genus of wasps

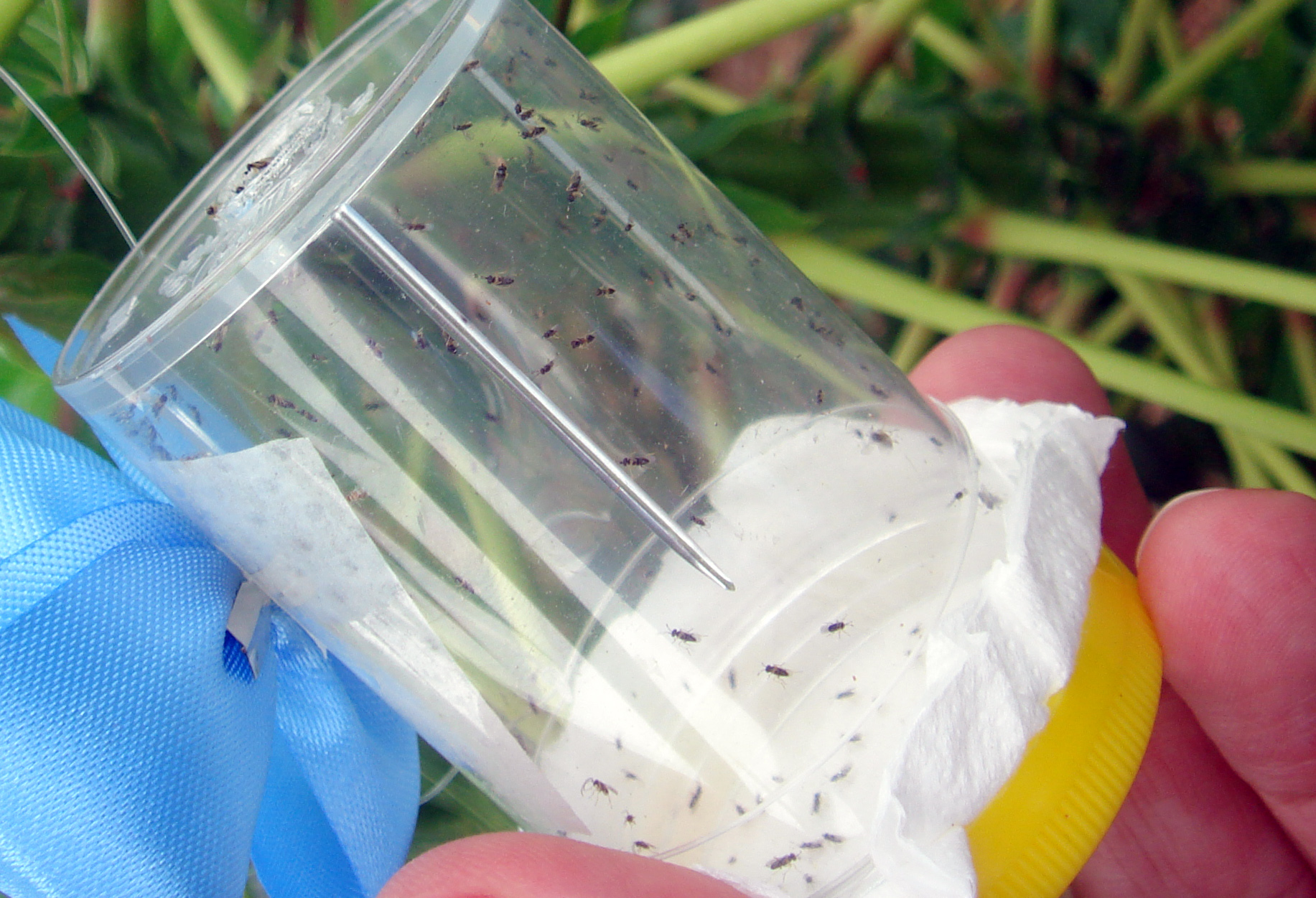
A vial containing A. lopezi, at a release ceremony organised and hosted by the Thai Department of Agriculture in the country's northeastern Khon Kaen province. The wasp is being used to help control cassava mealybug outbreaks in the country.

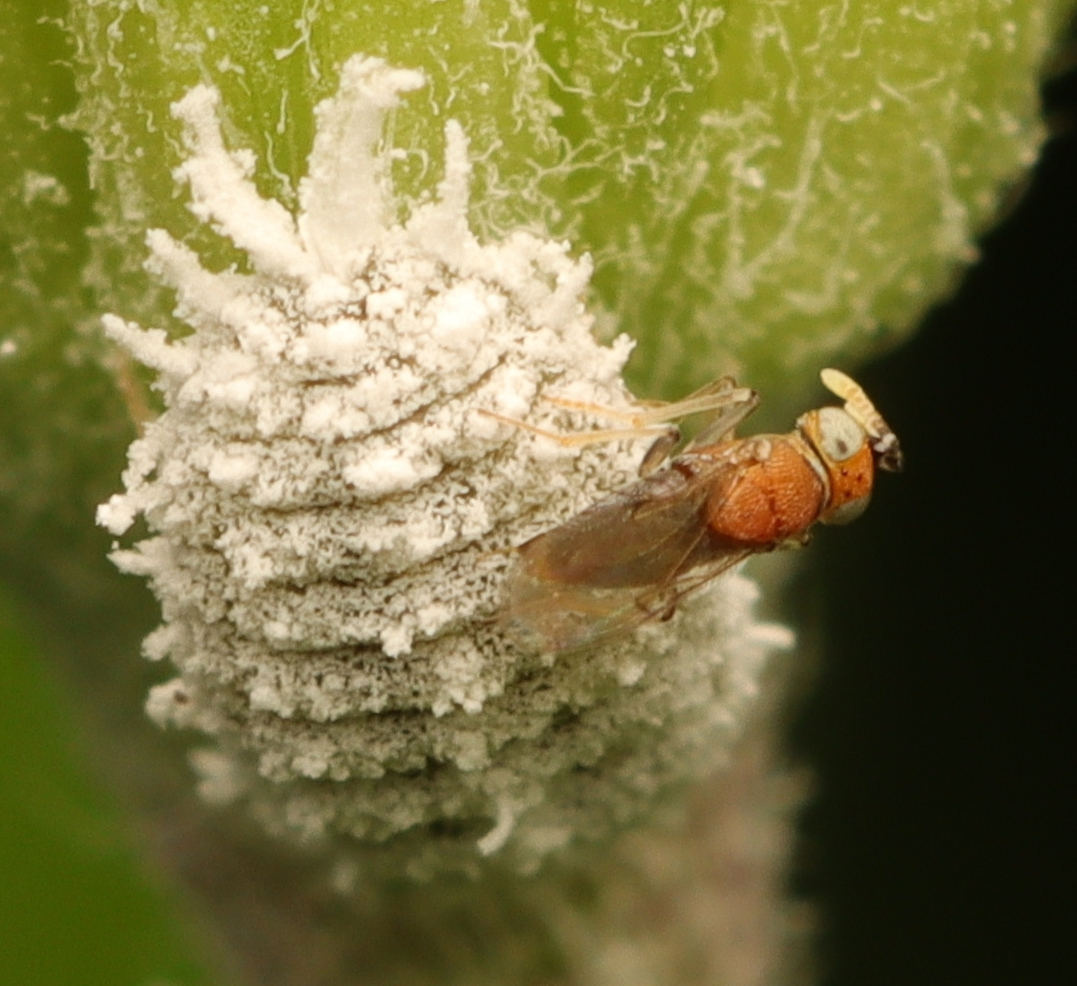
Anagyrus sp. attacking a mealybug.

Anagyrus is a large genus of parasitic wasps from the family Encyrtidae. Anagyrus is distributed throughout the world. A subgenus of Anagyrus is known as Nesoanagyrus (Beardsley 1969)

== Species ==
There are at least 247 species in this genus which consists of:

- Anagyrus abatos (Noyes & Menezes, 2000)
- Anagyrus abdulrassouli (Myartseva, Sugonjaev & Trjapitzin, 1982)
- Anagyrus abyssinicus Compere, 1939
- Anagyrus aceris Noyes & Hayat, 1994
- Anagyrus aciculatus (Blanchard, 1940)
- Anagyrus adamsoni Timberlake, 1941
- Anagyrus aega Noyes, 2000
- Anagyrus aegyptiacus Moursi, 1948
- Anagyrus agraensis Saraswat 1975
- Anagyrus alami Hayat 1970
- Anagyrus albatus Myartseva, 1982
- Anagyrus aligarhensis Agarwal & Alam 1959
- Anagyrus almoriensis Shafee, Alam & Agarwal, 1975
- Anagyrus amnicus Prinsloo, 1985
- Anagyrus amoenus Compere, 1939
- Anagyrus amudaryensis (Myartseva, 1982)
- Anagyrus ananatis Gahan, 1949
- Anagyrus antoninae Timberlake, 1920
- Anagyrus aper Noyes & Menezes 2000
- Anagyrus aquilonaris (Noyes & Hayat 1984)
- Anagyrus arambourgi Risbec, 1955
- Anagyrus aranzadii (Mercet 1921)
- Anagyrus archangelskayae Trjapitzin, 1972
- Anagyrus arenaria Prinsloo, 1985
- Anagyrus argyrus (Burks 1952)
- Anagyrus ashkhabadensis Myartseva, 1981
- Anagyrus aurantifrons Compere, 1926
- Anagyrus australiensis (Howard, 1898)
- Anagyrus bambeyi Risbec 1951
- Anagyrus belibus (Walker, 1837)
- Anagyrus bellator (De Santis, 1972)
- Anagyrus bellus (Girault 1921)
- Anagyrus beneficians Compere, 1943
- Anagyrus bermudensis (Kerrich, 1982)
- Anagyrus bicolor Noyes & Hayat, 1994
- Anagyrus bohemanni (Westwood, 1837)
- Anagyrus bouceki Hoffer, 1953
- Anagyrus brachyclavae (Wu & Xu, 2001)
- Anagyrus brevicornis (Shamim & Shafee, 1985)
- Anagyrus brevistigma De Santis, 1964
- Anagyrus bugandaensis Compere, 1939
- Anagyrus californicus (Compere 1947)
- Anagyrus calyxtoi Noyes, 2000
- Anagyrus cepio Noyes, 2000
- Anagyrus cercides Noyes & Menezes 2000
- Anagyrus chilensis (Brèthes, 1916)
- Anagyrus chrysos (Noyes & Hayat, 1994)
  - jr synonym Aagyrus chrysos (Noyes & Hayat, 1994)
- Anagyrus cilla Noyes & Menezes 2000
- Anagyrus clauseni Timberlake, 1924
- Anagyrus clavatus Sushil & Khan, 1996
- Anagyrus coccidivorus Dozier, 1932
- Anagyrus coccurae Sugonjaev, 1962
- Anagyrus comptoni Noyes & Hayat, 1994
- Anagyrus cooki (Girault 1919)
- Anagyrus coxalis Noyes & Hayat, 1994
- Anagyrus cristinae Noyes & Menezes 2000
- Anagyrus dactylopii (Howard 1898)
- Anagyrus darevskii (Trjapitzin 1965)
- Anagyrus diffinis Noyes & Hayat, 1994
- Anagyrus discolor Noyes & Hayat, 1994
- Anagyrus diversicornis (Howard 1894)
- Anagyrus dozieri Tachikawa, 1956
- Anagyrus echion Noyes & Hayat, 1994
- Anagyrus elgeri (Kerrich, 1982)
- Anagyrus elizabethae Noyes & Hayat, 1994
- Anagyrus elpis Noyes, 2000
- Anagyrus emeljanovi Trjapitzin, 1972
- Anagyrus ephyra Noyes & Hayat, 1994
- Anagyrus eudora Noyes, 2000
- Anagyrus euroto Noyes, 2000
- Anagyrus fasciiscapus (Girault 1932)
- Anagyrus fatimae Fatima & Agarwal, 1993
- Anagyrus ferus Noyes & Hayat, 1984
- Anagyrus flaviceps Timberlake, 1941
- Anagyrus flavimesopleurum (Girault 1917)
- Anagyrus floris Noyes & Hayat, 1994
- Anagyrus foersteri (Girault 1915)
- Anagyrus fraternus Perkins 1910
- Anagyrus frontolatus Sushil & Khan, 1996
- Anagyrus fujianensis Gu, 2004
- Anagyrus fujikona Tachikawa, 1963
- Anagyrus fusciventris (Girault, 1915)
- Anagyrus fuscus Shi, Si & Wang, 1994
- Anagyrus galinae (Myartseva, 1982)
- Anagyrus gaudens (Kerrich 1982)
- Anagyrus gemma Noyes, 2000
- Anagyrus gracilis (Hayat, 1970)
- Anagyrus gravis Noyes & Hayat, 1994
- Anagyrus greeni Howard 1896
- Anagyrus grenfelli Noyes & Hayat, 1994
- Anagyrus hainanensis Noyes & Hayat, 1994
- Anagyrus haloxyli Sugonjaev, 1968
- Anagyrus hammadae Trjapitzin & Rozanov, 1972
- Anagyrus hansoni Noyes & Menezes 2000
- Anagyrus haroldi Noyes & Hayat, 1994
- Anagyrus hayati Sushil & Khan, 1996
- Anagyrus hebes Noyes, 2000
- Anagyrus henanensis Shi, Si & Wang, 1994
- Anagyrus hippocoon Trjapitzin, 1965
- Anagyrus impar Noyes & Hayat, 1994
- Anagyrus indicus (Subba Rao, 1967)
- Anagyrus inermis Noyes & Hayat, 1994
- Anagyrus insolitus (Howard 1897)
- Anagyrus ishaqi Fatima, 1999
- Anagyrus jacksoni Noyes & Hayat, 1994
- Anagyrus jenniferae Noyes & Hayat, 1994
- Anagyrus juani Noyes, 2000
- Anagyrus jucundus De Santis, 1964
- Anagyrus juno Noyes & Hayat, 1994
- Anagyrus kamali Moursi 1948
- Anagyrus kivuensis Compere, 1939
- Anagyrus laeviceps Perkins, 1910
- Anagyrus lampe Noyes & Menezes 2000
- Anagyrus lebadeia Noyes, 2000
- Anagyrus levis Noyes & Hayat, 1994
- Anagyrus lineatipes (Girault 1919)
- Anagyrus livens Noyes, 2000
- Anagyrus lizanorum Noyes & Menezes 2000
- Anagyrus loecki Noyes & Menezes 2000
- Anagyrus longicornis Mercet 1923
- Anagyrus longipennis Shafee, Alam & Agarwal, 1975
- Anagyrus lopezi (De Santis, 1964)
- Anagyrus luci Noyes & Hayat, 1994
- Anagyrus lutescens Noyes & Hayat, 1994
- Anagyrus major Perkins, 1910
- Anagyrus malayensis Noyes & Hayat, 1994
- Anagyrus malenotus (De Santis, 1972)
- Anagyrus mandibularis Sushil & Khan, 1996
- Anagyrus mangicola Noyes, 1990
- Anagyrus maritzae Noyes, 2000
- Anagyrus marquesanus Timberlake, 1941
- Anagyrus matho Noyes, 2000
- Anagyrus matritensis (Mercet, 1921)
- Anagyrus mazaces Noyes & Hayat, 1994
- Anagyrus minium (Mercet, 1921)
- Anagyrus mirtesae Noyes & Menezes, 2000
- Anagyrus mirus (Girault, 1915)
- Anagyrus mirzai Agarwal & Alam 1959
- Anagyrus mohani Sushil & Khan, 1996
- Anagyrus montivagus (De Santis, 1964)
- Anagyrus mumfordi Timberlake, 1941
- Anagyrus mycale Noyes, 2000
- Anagyrus narcicius Salazar, 1981
- Anagyrus nesticoccus Dang & Wang, 2002
- Anagyrus niger (Ishii, 1928)
- Anagyrus nigrescens Compere, 1939
- Anagyrus nigricans Perkins, 1910
- Anagyrus nigriceps (De Santis, 1972)
- Anagyrus nigricorpus Shafee, Alam & Agarwal, 1975
- Anagyrus nigriflagellum (Girault 1915)
- Anagyrus nigritus (Howard, 1898)
- Anagyrus nishidai Noyes & Hayat, 1994
- Anagyrus nitidus Trjapitzin & Rzaeva, 1967
- Anagyrus novickyi Hoffer, 1953
- Anagyrus obodas Noyes & Hayat, 1994
- Anagyrus ocellatus Noyes & Menezes 2000
- Anagyrus odacon Noyes & Menezes 2000
- Anagyrus orbitalis Timberlake, 1941
- Anagyrus paralia Noyes & Menezes, 2000
- Anagyrus pergandei Dang & Wang, 2002
- Anagyrus petronae Noyes, 2000
- Anagyrus phaena Noyes & Menezes 2000
- Anagyrus phasis Noyes, 2000
- Anagyrus phya Noyes & Menezes 2000
- Anagyrus pilosus Ishii, 1928
- Anagyrus procles Noyes, 2000
- Anagyrus pseudococci (Girault 1915)
- Anagyrus pulcher (Ashmead, 1888)
- Anagyrus pulchricornis (Howard 1894)
- Anagyrus pullus Compere, 1939
- Anagyrus punctifrons Timberlake 1941
- Anagyrus putonophilus Compere 1947
- Anagyrus qadrii (Hayat, Alam & Agarwal, 1975)
- Anagyrus quadrimaculatus Xu & He 1996
- Anagyrus ranchiensis Shamim & Shafee, 1984
- Anagyrus rapo Noyes & Menezes, 2000
- Anagyrus remotor Noyes, 2000
- Anagyrus rhopaloides Noyes, 2000
- Anagyrus rifens Noyes & Menezes 2000
- Anagyrus rosichoni Noyes & Menezes 2000
- Anagyrus rotundiceps (Girault, 1932)
- Anagyrus rubellus (Annecke, 1974)
- Anagyrus rubinae Noyes & Hayat, 1994
- Anagyrus rugas Noyes & Hayat, 1994
- Anagyrus rusticus (De Santis, 1964)
- Anagyrus sabas Noyes & Hayat, 1994
- Anagyrus saccharicola Timberlake, 1932
- Anagyrus saintpierrei Girault, 1913
- Anagyrus saipanensis Doutt, 1952
- Anagyrus salazari Noyes & Menezes 2000
- Anagyrus sameenae Noyes & Hayat, 1994
- Anagyrus sawadai Ishii, 1928
- Anagyrus scaea Noyes, 2000
- Anagyrus scapularis Myartseva, 1982
- Anagyrus schoenherri (Westwood, 1837)
- Anagyrus scimitar Noyes & Hayat, 1994
- Anagyrus securicornis Domenichini, 1953
- Anagyrus semifulvus Girault, 1915
- Anagyrus shahidi Hayat, 1979
- Anagyrus siccus (Prinsloo & Annecke, 1976)
- Anagyrus similis (Girault 1915)
- Anagyrus sinensis Noyes & Hayat, 1994
- Anagyrus sinope Noyes & Menezes 2000
- Anagyrus smithi Doutt, 1952
- Anagyrus sogdianus Sugonjaev, 1968
- Anagyrus sophax Noyes & Menezes 2000
- Anagyrus spaici (Hoffer, 1970)
- Anagyrus spica (Girault 1921)
- Anagyrus subalbipes Ishii, 1928
- Anagyrus subflaviceps (Girault 1915)
- Anagyrus subnigricornis Ishii, 1928
- Anagyrus subproximus (Silvestri, 1915)
- Anagyrus subtilis Noyes & Hayat, 1994
- Anagyrus sucro Noyes, 2000
- Anagyrus suia Noyes, 2000
- Anagyrus surekhae Noyes & Menezes 2000
- Anagyrus swezeyi Timberlake, 1919
- Anagyrus tamaricicola Trjapitzin, 1968
- Anagyrus tanystis De Santis, 1964
- Anagyrus telon Noyes & Menezes 2000
- Anagyrus tenuis Noyes & Hayat, 1994
- Anagyrus terebratus (Howard 1894)
- Anagyrus thailandicus (Myartseva, 1979)
- Anagyrus theana Noyes, 2000
- Anagyrus theon Noyes & Hayat, 1994
- Anagyrus thoe Noyes, 2000
- Anagyrus thyridopterygis (Ashmead, 1886)
- Anagyrus tibimaculatus Agarwal, 1965
- Anagyrus townsendi (Howard, 1898)
- Anagyrus tricolor (Girault 1913)
- Anagyrus trinidadensis (Kerrich 1953)
- Anagyrus tristis Noyes & Hayat, 1994
- Anagyrus trjapitzini Sharipov, 1983
- Anagyrus tyana Noyes, 2000
- Anagyrus tymber Noyes, 2000
- Anagyrus umairi Noyes & Hayat, 1994
- Anagyrus ussuriensis Sharkov, 1984
- Anagyrus varithorax (Girault 1923)
- Anagyrus villalobosi Noyes & Menezes 2000
- Anagyrus vladimiri - mealybug biocontrol
- Anagyrus vochos Noyes & Hayat, 1994
- Anagyrus vulso Noyes & Menezes 2000
- Anagyrus wayfoongi Noyes & Hayat, 1994
- Anagyrus xanthogaster Perkins, 1910
- Anagyrus yuccae (Coquillet, 1890)
- Anagyrus zaitzevi Trjapitzin, 1972
- Anagyrus zama Noyes & Menezes 2000
- Anagyrus zubairi Noyes & Hayat, 1994
- Anagyrus zygia (Trjapitzin, 1966)
