= Austroencyrtus =

Scientific classification
- Kingdom: Animalia
- Phylum: Arthropoda
- Clade: Pancrustacea
- Class: Insecta
- Order: Hymenoptera
- Family: Encyrtidae
- Subfamily: Encyrtinae
- Genus: Austroencyrtus; Girault, 1923

Type species
- Austroencyrtus annulicornis Girault, 1923

Synonyms
- Paracerchysius Liao and Tachikawa, 1984; Zamenhofella Girault, 1941

Genus of wasps

Austroencyrtus is a genus of parasitic wasps.

== Taxonomic history and synonyms ==
In 1923, Alexandre Arsène Girault described the species A. annulicornis and circumscribed the new genus Austroencyrtus for it. In 1941, Girault created a new genus, Zamenhofella for another new species, Z. voltai. The genus Zamenhofella was classified as a junior synonym of Austroencyrtus in 1997 by Edward Dahms and Gordon Gordh. Liao Dingxi and Tetsusaburo Tachikawa circumscribed the genus Paracerchysius for their new species P. ceresii in 1984; Tachikawa synonymized this genus with Austroencyrtus the following year following the suggestion of Vladimir A. Trjapitzin.

== Species ==
As of 2017, the following species are recognized:

- Austroencyrtus annulicornis Girault, 1923
- Austroencyrtus ceresii (Liao & Tachikawa, 1984)
- Austroencyrtus voltai (Girault, 1941)

=== Former and undescribed species ===
In 1984, John Noyes (entomologist) and Mohammad Hayat included A. guamensis (Fullaway, 1946), which they had transferred from Cerchysius. Noyes and Hayat also claimed there were at least three additional undescribed species in Austroencyrtus from Papua New Guinea and New Hebrides.

== Distribution ==
Species in this genus are found in Australia and China.
