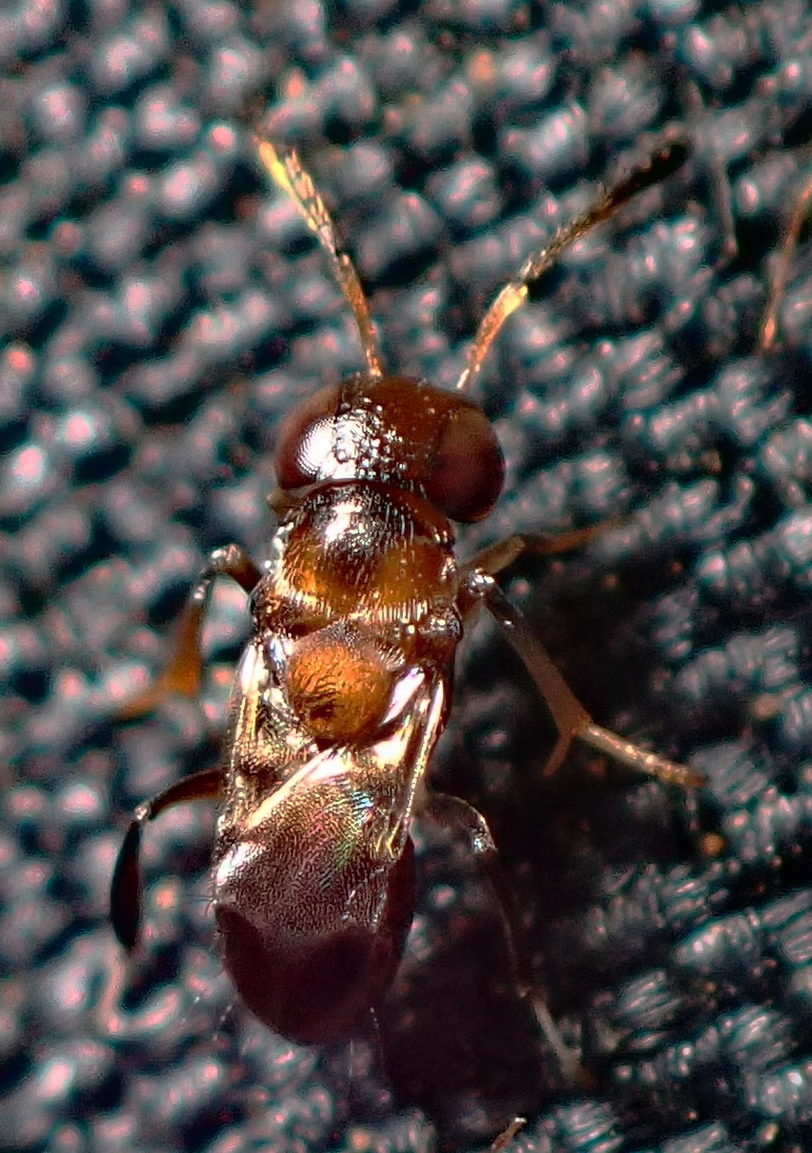
- Encyrtus infelix, New Zealand.

Scientific classification
- Kingdom: Animalia
- Phylum: Arthropoda
- Clade: Pancrustacea
- Class: Insecta
- Order: Hymenoptera
- Family: Encyrtidae
- Subfamily: Encyrtinae
- Genus: Encyrtus; Latreille, 1809

Type species
- Chrysis infidus Rossi, 1790

Species
- See text

= Encyrtus =

Genus of wasps

Encyrtus is a parasitic wasp genus in the family Encyrtidae, first described in 1809. Like most within the subfamily Encyrtinae, this genus comprises parasitoids of scale insects.

== Selected species ==
There are 96 species in this genus, including:

- Encyrtus aurantii
- Encyrtus infelix
- Encyrtus swederi

== See also ==
- List of encyrtid genera
