= Arzonella =

Scientific classification
- Kingdom: Animalia
- Phylum: Arthropoda
- Class: Insecta
- Order: Hymenoptera
- Family: Encyrtidae
- Genus: Arzonella; Pagliano & Scaramozzino, 1989
- Species: A. curiosa

Binomial name
- Arzonella curiosa (Girault, 1940)

Genus of wasps

Arzonella is a monotypic genus of wasps belonging to the family Encyrtidae. The only species is Arzonella curiosa.
