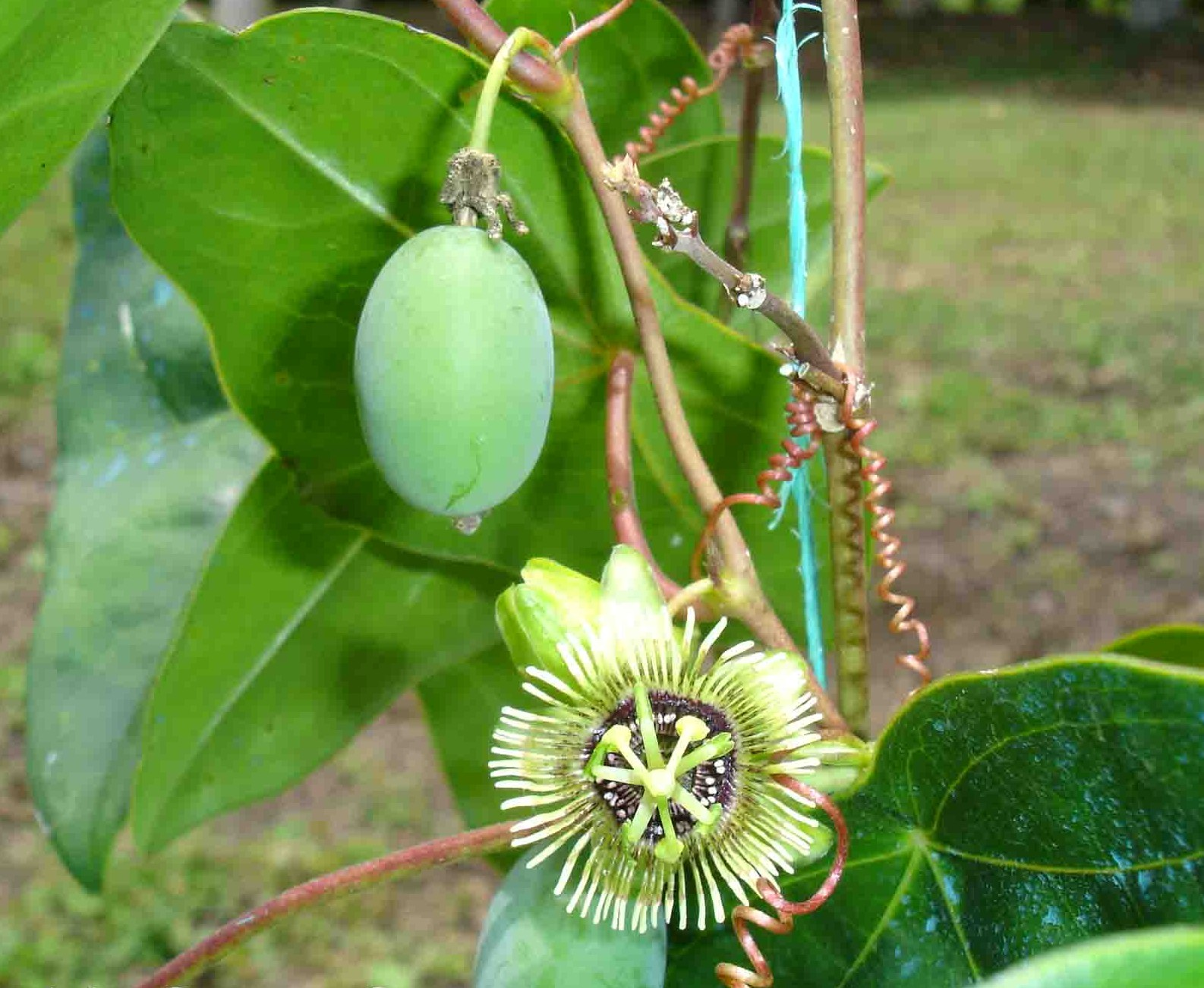

Scientific classification
- Kingdom: Plantae
- Clade: Tracheophytes
- Clade: Angiosperms
- Clade: Eudicots
- Clade: Rosids
- Order: Malpighiales
- Family: Passifloraceae
- Genus: Passiflora
- Species: P. coriacea

Binomial name
- Passiflora coriacea Juss.

Synonyms
- Passiflora maximaca Tang

= Passiflora coriacea =

Species of vine

Passiflora coriacea, commonly known as the wild sweet calabash or bat leaved passion flower, is a tropical vine in the family Passifloraceae.

It is fast-growing, with distinct bi-lobed leaves resembling bat wings and purple ornamental fruit that are oval in shape. The leaves are coriaceous (leathery), hence the name. The yellowish-green flowers are typically 2.5 - 3.5 cm wide and form a terminal raceme.
