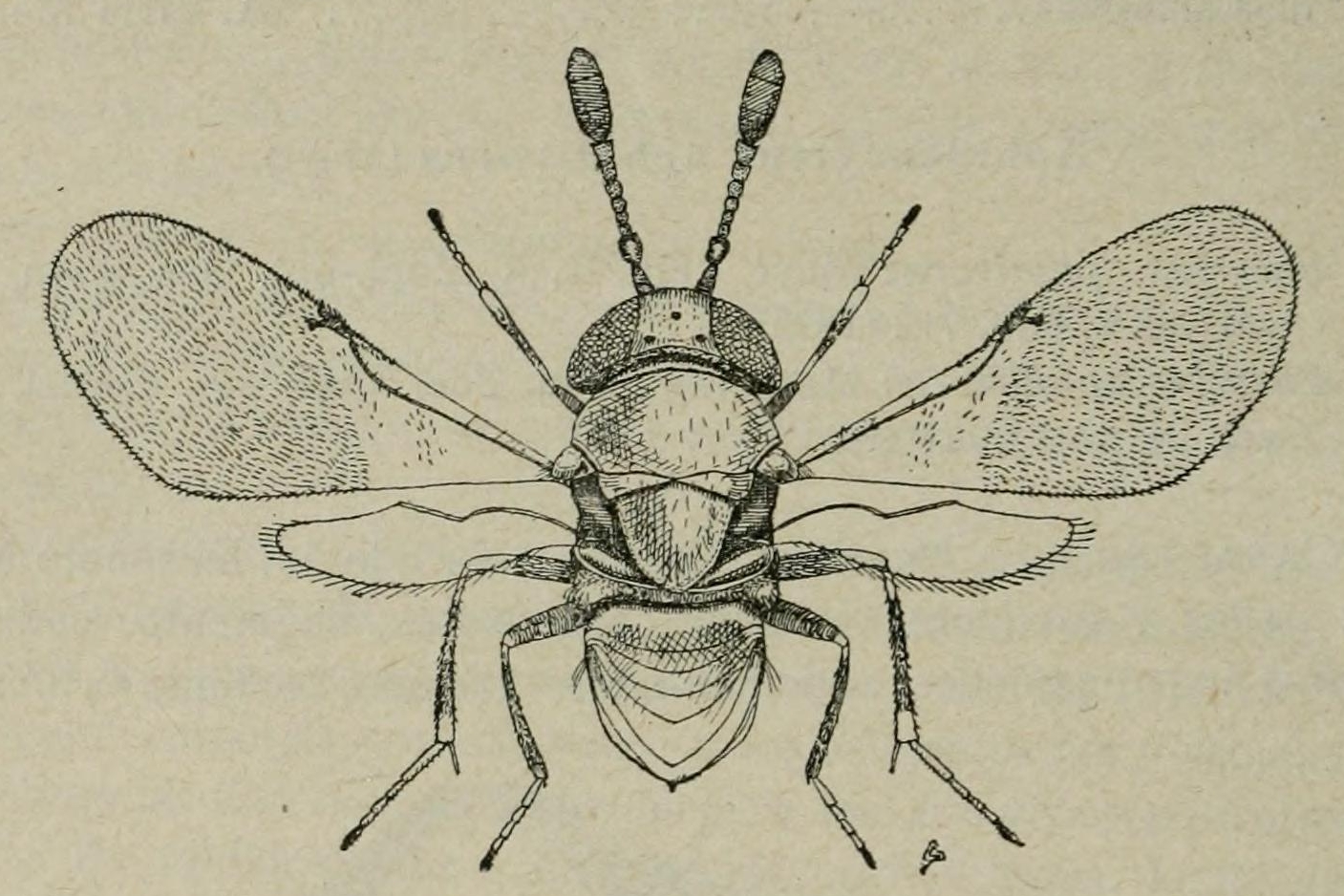
- Female Syrphophagus aphidivorus in Spain

Scientific classification
- Domain: Eukaryota
- Kingdom: Animalia
- Phylum: Arthropoda
- Class: Insecta
- Order: Hymenoptera
- Family: Encyrtidae
- Genus: Syrphophagus; Ashmead, 1900

Synonyms
- Aphidencyrtus Ashmead, 1900; Echthrobaccha Perkins, 1906

= Syrphophagus =

Genus of wasps

Syrphophagus is a genus of wasps belonging to the family Encyrtidae.

The genus has a cosmopolitan distribution.

Species:

- Syrphophagus acamas (Trjapitzin, 1967)
- Syrphophagus aeruginosus (Dalman, 1820)
- Syrphophagus africanus (Gahan, 1932)
- Syrphophagus amabilis Sharkov, 1995
- Syrphophagus annellicornis (Hoffer, 1965)
- Syrphophagus annulipes (Thomson, 1876)
- Syrphophagus aphidivorus (Mayr, 1876)
- Syrphophagus aquacyaneus (Girault, 1923)
- Syrphophagus ariantes (Walker, 1837)
- Syrphophagus arundinicola Hoffer, 1965
- Syrphophagus bacchae (Blanchard, 1940)
- Syrphophagus brevipes (Erdos, 1961)
- Syrphophagus cassatus (Annecke, 1969)
- Syrphophagus cecidium De Santis & Fernandes, 1989
- Syrphophagus celia (Girault, 1917)
- Syrphophagus chinensis Liao, 1987
- Syrphophagus cinctipes (Girault, 1915)
- Syrphophagus danuvicus (Erdos, 1957)
- Syrphophagus dlabolianus Hoffer, 1970
- Syrphophagus elaeagni (Trjapitzin, 1969)
- Syrphophagus fabulosus Hoffer, 1965
- Syrphophagus feralis (Girault, 1929)
- Syrphophagus flavicornis (Mercet, 1921)
- Syrphophagus flavithorax (Girault, 1915)
- Syrphophagus flavitibiae (De Santis, 1964)
- Syrphophagus fuscipes (Dalman, 1820)
- Syrphophagus gracilis Hoffer, 1965
- Syrphophagus hakki Agarwal, 1963
- Syrphophagus herbidus (Dalman, 1820)
- Syrphophagus hofferi (Hayat, 1973)
- Syrphophagus hyalipennis (Mayr, 1876)
- Syrphophagus injuriosus (Perkins, 1906)
- Syrphophagus jucundus (Mercet, 1923)
- Syrphophagus kasparyani Sharkov, 1995
- Syrphophagus kostjukovi Trjapitzin, 1988
- Syrphophagus kovalevi (Trjapitzin, 1967)
- Syrphophagus kumaoensis (Bhatnagar, 1952)
- Syrphophagus lachni (Ashmead, 1885)
- Syrphophagus lineola (Mayr, 1876)
- Syrphophagus luciani (Girault, 1922)
- Syrphophagus mamitus (Walker, 1837)
- Syrphophagus marilandicus (Girault, 1917)
- Syrphophagus mercetii (Masi, 1926)
- Syrphophagus metallicus (Girault, 1914)
- Syrphophagus nigricornis (De Santis, 1964)
- Syrphophagus nigricornis (Girault, 1922)
- Syrphophagus nigrocyaneus Ashmead, 1904
- Syrphophagus nubeculus De Santis, 1964
- Syrphophagus obscurus (Girault, 1923)
- Syrphophagus occidentalis (Girault, 1917)
- Syrphophagus orientalis (Myartseva, 1981)
- Syrphophagus pacificus Sharkov, 1995
- Syrphophagus parvus (Girault, 1923)
- Syrphophagus parvus (Mercet, 1921)
- Syrphophagus perdubius (Girault, 1926)
- Syrphophagus pertiades (Walker, 1837)
- Syrphophagus philotis (Walker, 1848)
- Syrphophagus puparia (Girault, 1929)
- Syrphophagus qadrii (Alam, 1961)
- Syrphophagus quadrimaculatae (Ashmead, 1881)
- Syrphophagus quercicola (Hoffer, 1970)
- Syrphophagus raffaellini (Girault, 1922)
- Syrphophagus rossittenicus Trjapitzin & Manukyan, 1993
- Syrphophagus rotundatus (Kaul & Agarwal, 1986)
- Syrphophagus rugulosus Hoffer, 1963
- Syrphophagus semipurpureus (Hoffer, 1965)
- Syrphophagus similis (Prinsloo, 1981)
- Syrphophagus smithi Kamal, 1926
- Syrphophagus sosius (Walker, 1837)
- Syrphophagus splaeophoriae Tachikawa, 1963
- Syrphophagus staryi (Hoffer, 1970)
- Syrphophagus subviridis (Hoffer, 1970)
- Syrphophagus tachikawai (Hoffer, 1970)
- Syrphophagus taeniatus (Förster, 1861)
- Syrphophagus taiwanus Hayat & Lin, 1988
- Syrphophagus terebratus (Trjapitzin, 1967)
- Syrphophagus transsylvanicus (Erdos, 1957)
- Syrphophagus varicornis (Girault, 1923)
- Syrphophagus vicinus (Trjapitzin, 1978)
- Syrphophagus wayanadensis Hayat
