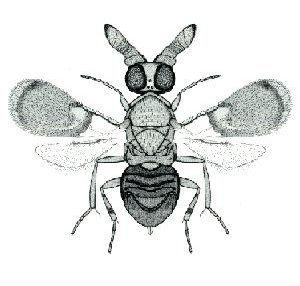

Scientific classification
- Domain: Eukaryota
- Kingdom: Animalia
- Phylum: Arthropoda
- Class: Insecta
- Order: Hymenoptera
- Family: Encyrtidae
- Genus: Anicetus
- Species: A. communis

Binomial name
- Anicetus communis Annecke, 1967

= Anicetus communis =

Species of wasp

Anicetus communis is a parasitic wasp species in the genus Anicetus.
