= Schilleriella (wasp) =

Scientific classification
- Domain: Eukaryota
- Kingdom: Animalia
- Phylum: Arthropoda
- Class: Insecta
- Order: Hymenoptera
- Family: Encyrtidae
- Genus: Schilleriella; Ghesquière, 1946

Synonyms
- Schilleria Girault, 1932

Genus of wasps

Schilleriella is a genus of wasps belonging to the family Encyrtidae.

The species of this genus are found in Australia.

Species:

- Schilleriella brevipterus Xu, 2005
- Schilleriella pulchra (Girault, 1932)
