= Merlen =

Merlen is a surname. Notable people with the surname include:

- Jean Baptiste Merlen (1769–1850), French engraver and medalist
- Jean Baptiste van Merlen (1772–1815), Dutch-Belgian army officer
- Jocelyn Merlen (born 1972), French footballer
- Ryan Merlen (born 2002), French footballer

== See also ==
- Merle (surname)
