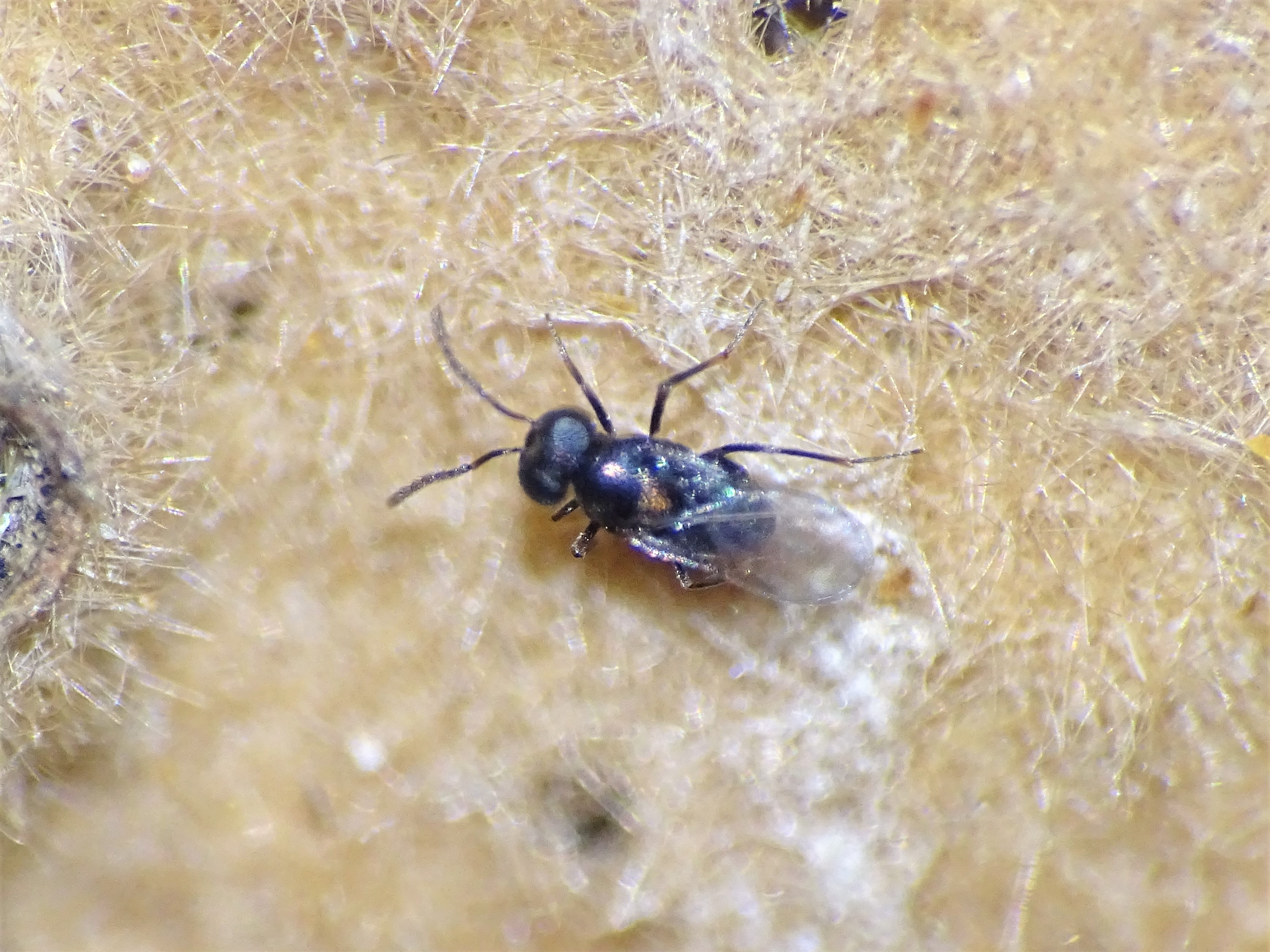
- Ooencyrtus kuvanae in Ottawa, Canada

Scientific classification
- Domain: Eukaryota
- Kingdom: Animalia
- Phylum: Arthropoda
- Class: Insecta
- Order: Hymenoptera
- Family: Encyrtidae
- Genus: Ooencyrtus; Ashmead, 1990

Type species
- Encyrtus clisiocampae Ashmead, 1893

Synonyms
- Echthrodryinus Perkins, 1906; Ectopiognatha Perkins, 1906; Fulgoridicida Perkins, 1906; Ooencyrtus Ashmead, 1900; O. (Encyrtus) Latreille, 1809; O. (Ooencyrtellus) Hoffer, 1963; O. (Schedius) Howard, 1910; Pseudolitomastix Risbec, 1954; Schedius Howard, 1910; Simmondsiella Noyes, 1980; Tetracnemella Girault, 1915; Xesmatia Timberlake, 1920

= Ooencyrtus =

Genus of wasps

Ooencyrtus is a genus of chalcid wasp. William Harris Ashmead named and circumscribed the genus in 1900.

== Species ==
As of 2017, approximately 320 species are recognized, including:

- Ooencyrtus anabrivorus Gahan, 1942
- Ooencyrtus clisiocampae (Ashmead, 1893)
- Ooencyrtus johnsoni (Howard, 1898)
- Ooencyrtus kuvanae (Howard, 1910)
- Ooencyrtus marcelloi Guerrieri and Noyes, 2010
- Ooencyrtus papilionis Ashmead, 1905
