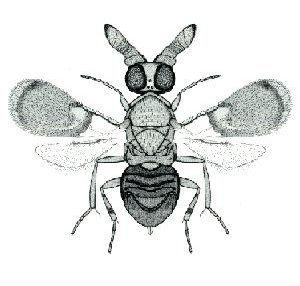
- Anicetus communis

Scientific classification
- Kingdom: Animalia
- Phylum: Arthropoda
- Clade: Pancrustacea
- Class: Insecta
- Order: Hymenoptera
- Superfamily: Chalcidoidea
- Family: Encyrtidae; Walker, 1837

Subfamilies
- Encyrtinae; Tetracneminae

Diversity
- Two subfamilies of around 3710 species in 455 genera

= Encyrtidae =

Encyrtidae Temporal range: Middle Eocene - Recent

Family of wasps

Encyrtidae is a large family of parasitoid wasps, with some 3710 described species in about 455 genera. The larvae of the majority are primary parasitoids on Hemiptera, though other hosts are attacked, and details of the life history can be variable (e.g., some attack eggs, some attack larvae, others are hyperparasites, and some Encyrtidae develop as parasitoids of ticks). They are found throughout the world in virtually all habitats, and are extremely important as biological control agents. They may also present as an ecological threat to the population of some species. For example, the endangered Papilio homerus butterfly is parasitized at a rate of 77%, making them the main contributor to egg mortality in this (and other) butterfly species.

Some species exhibit a remarkable developmental phenomenon called "polyembryony", in which a single egg multiplies clonally in the host and produces large numbers of identical adult wasps. Even more remarkably, some of the larvae are larger than the others and act in a similar way to the "soldiers" of eusocial insects, attacking any other wasp larvae already in the body of the host, and dying without reproducing ("altruism").

Wasps in this family are relatively easy to separate from other Chalcidoidea by features of the wing venation, the migration of the cerci forwards on the metasoma (and accompanying distortion of the tergites), and a greatly enlarged mesopleuron with anteriorly positioned mesocoxae.

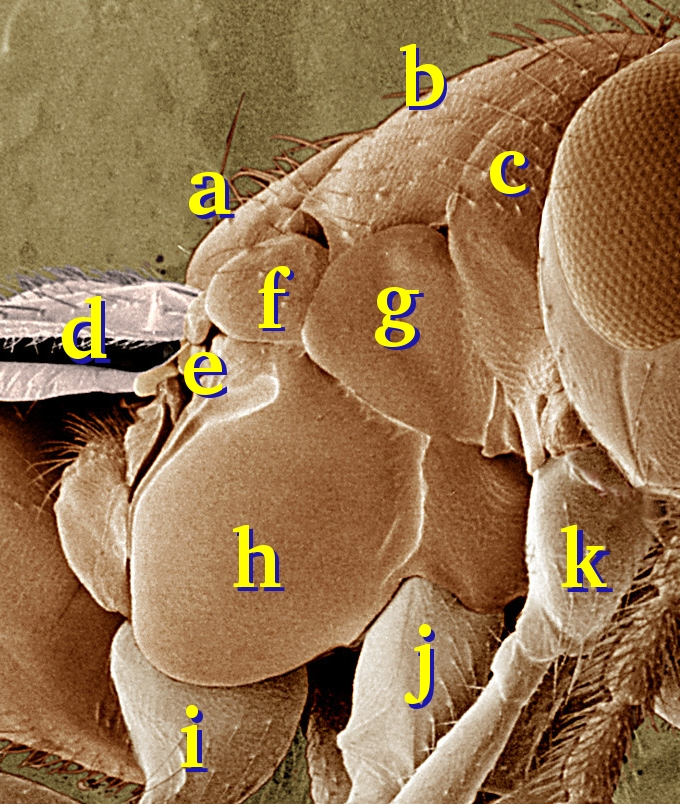
Encyrtid thorax; "h" is the mesopleuron, and "j" is the mesocoxa

An extinct genus Archencyrtus has been described from the Middle Eocene age Sakhalin amber in Eastern Russia.
