= Microchilo elgrecoi =

Scientific classification
- Domain: Eukaryota
- Kingdom: Animalia
- Phylum: Arthropoda
- Class: Insecta
- Order: Lepidoptera
- Family: Crambidae
- Subfamily: Crambinae
- Tribe: incertae sedis
- Genus: Microchilo
- Species: M. elgrecoi

Binomial name
- Microchilo elgrecoi Błeszyński, 1966

Species of moth

Microchilo elgrecoi is a moth in the family Crambidae. It was described by Stanisław Błeszyński in 1966. It is found on Sumatra.
