= Microchilo syndyas =

Scientific classification
- Kingdom: Animalia
- Phylum: Arthropoda
- Class: Insecta
- Order: Lepidoptera
- Family: Crambidae
- Subfamily: Crambinae
- Tribe: incertae sedis
- Genus: Microchilo
- Species: M. syndyas

Binomial name
- Microchilo syndyas (Meyrick, 1938)

Synonyms
- Scoparia syndyas Meyrick, 1938

Species of moth

Microchilo syndyas is a moth in the family Crambidae. It was described by Edward Meyrick in 1938. It is found on Java in Indonesia.
