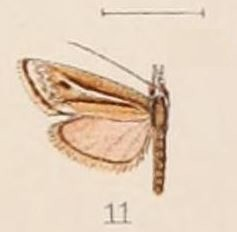

Scientific classification
- Kingdom: Animalia
- Phylum: Arthropoda
- Class: Insecta
- Order: Lepidoptera
- Family: Crambidae
- Subfamily: Crambinae
- Tribe: incertae sedis
- Genus: Microchilo
- Species: M. acroperalis

Binomial name
- Microchilo acroperalis (Hampson, 1908)

Synonyms
- Platytes acroperalis Hampson, 1908

= Microchilo acroperalis =

Species of moth

Microchilo acroperalis is a moth of the family Crambidae. It is found in Sri Lanka.
