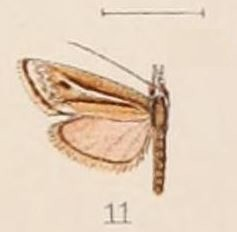
- Microchilo acroperalis

Scientific classification
- Domain: Eukaryota
- Kingdom: Animalia
- Phylum: Arthropoda
- Class: Insecta
- Order: Lepidoptera
- Family: Crambidae
- Subfamily: Crambinae
- Tribe: incertae sedis
- Genus: Microchilo; Okano, 1962

= Microchilo =

Genus of moths

Microchilo is a genus of moths of the family Crambidae.

== Species ==
- Microchilo acroperalis (Hampson, 1908)
- Microchilo elgrecoi Bleszynski, 1966
- Microchilo eromenalis (Hampson, 1919)
- Microchilo fulvizonella (Hampson, 1896)
- Microchilo fulvosignalis (Snellen, 1880)
- Microchilo gelastis (Meyrick, 1887)
- Microchilo griseofuscalis (Rothschild, 1915)
- Microchilo inexpectellus Bleszynski, 1965
- Microchilo inouei Okano, 1962
- Microchilo javaiensis Bleszynski, 1966
- Microchilo kawabei Inoue, 1989
- Microchilo murilloi Bleszynski, 1966
- Microchilo nugalis (Snellen, 1880)
- Microchilo snelleni Bleszynski, 1966
- Microchilo syndyas Meyrick, 1938
