= Microchilo griseofuscalis =

Scientific classification
- Domain: Eukaryota
- Kingdom: Animalia
- Phylum: Arthropoda
- Class: Insecta
- Order: Lepidoptera
- Family: Crambidae
- Subfamily: Crambinae
- Tribe: incertae sedis
- Genus: Microchilo
- Species: M. griseofuscalis

Binomial name
- Microchilo griseofuscalis (Rothschild, 1915)

Synonyms
- Pionea griseofuscalis Rothschild, 1915

Species of moth

Microchilo griseofuscalis is a moth in the family Crambidae. It was described by Rothschild in 1915. It is found in New Guinea.
