= Microchilo nugalis =

Scientific classification
- Kingdom: Animalia
- Phylum: Arthropoda
- Class: Insecta
- Order: Lepidoptera
- Family: Crambidae
- Subfamily: Crambinae
- Tribe: incertae sedis
- Genus: Microchilo
- Species: M. nugalis

Binomial name
- Microchilo nugalis (Snellen, 1880)

Synonyms
- Scoparia nugalis Snellen, 1880

Species of moth

Microchilo nugalis is a moth in the family Crambidae. It was described by Snellen in 1880. It is found on Sulawesi.
