= Microchilo inouei =

Scientific classification
- Domain: Eukaryota
- Kingdom: Animalia
- Phylum: Arthropoda
- Class: Insecta
- Order: Lepidoptera
- Family: Crambidae
- Subfamily: Crambinae
- Tribe: incertae sedis
- Genus: Microchilo
- Species: M. inouei

Binomial name
- Microchilo inouei Okano, 1962

Species of moth

Microchilo inouei is a moth in the family Crambidae. It was described by Okano in 1962. It is found in Japan (Honshu).
