= Microchilo eromenalis =

Scientific classification
- Kingdom: Animalia
- Phylum: Arthropoda
- Class: Insecta
- Order: Lepidoptera
- Family: Crambidae
- Subfamily: Crambinae
- Tribe: incertae sedis
- Genus: Microchilo
- Species: M. eromenalis

Binomial name
- Microchilo eromenalis (Hampson, 1919)

Synonyms
- Argyria eromenalis Hampson, 1919

Species of moth

Microchilo eromenalis is a moth in the family Crambidae. It was described by George Hampson in 1919. It is found on Sumbawa in Indonesia.
