= Microchilo inexpectellus =

Scientific classification
- Domain: Eukaryota
- Kingdom: Animalia
- Phylum: Arthropoda
- Class: Insecta
- Order: Lepidoptera
- Family: Crambidae
- Subfamily: Crambinae
- Tribe: incertae sedis
- Genus: Microchilo
- Species: M. inexpectellus

Binomial name
- Microchilo inexpectellus Błeszyński, 1965

Species of moth

Microchilo inexpectellus is a moth in the family Crambidae. It was described by Stanisław Błeszyński in 1965. It is found in Honshu, Japan.
