= Microchilo fulvizonella =

Scientific classification
- Kingdom: Animalia
- Phylum: Arthropoda
- Class: Insecta
- Order: Lepidoptera
- Family: Crambidae
- Subfamily: Crambinae
- Tribe: incertae sedis
- Genus: Microchilo
- Species: M. fulvizonella

Binomial name
- Microchilo fulvizonella (Hampson, 1896)

Synonyms
- Platytes fulvizonella Hampson, 1896; Argyria trizona Meyrick, 1931

Species of moth

Microchilo fulvizonella is a moth in the family Crambidae. It was described by George Hampson in 1896. It is found in Assam, India.
