= Microchilo gelastis =

Scientific classification
- Kingdom: Animalia
- Phylum: Arthropoda
- Class: Insecta
- Order: Lepidoptera
- Family: Crambidae
- Subfamily: Crambinae
- Tribe: incertae sedis
- Genus: Microchilo
- Species: M. gelastis

Binomial name
- Microchilo gelastis (Meyrick, 1887)

Synonyms
- Hednota gelastis Meyrick, 1887; Talis isodeta Turner, 1904

Species of moth

Microchilo gelastis is a moth in the family Crambidae. It was described by Edward Meyrick in 1887. It is found in Australia, where it has been recorded from Victoria and Tasmania.
