= Microchilo kawabei =

Scientific classification
- Kingdom: Animalia
- Phylum: Arthropoda
- Clade: Pancrustacea
- Class: Insecta
- Order: Lepidoptera
- Family: Crambidae
- Subfamily: Crambinae
- Tribe: incertae sedis
- Genus: Microchilo
- Species: M. kawabei

Binomial name
- Microchilo kawabei Inoue, 1989

Species of moth

Microchilo kawabei is a moth in the family Crambidae. It was described by Hiroshi Inoue in 1989. It is found in Taiwan.
