= Desisopsis maculata =

Scientific classification
- Domain: Eukaryota
- Kingdom: Animalia
- Phylum: Arthropoda
- Class: Insecta
- Order: Coleoptera
- Suborder: Polyphaga
- Infraorder: Cucujiformia
- Family: Cerambycidae
- Tribe: Pteropliini
- Genus: Desisopsis
- Species: D. maculata

Binomial name
- Desisopsis maculata Hüdepohl, 1995

Species of beetle

Desisopsis maculata is a species of beetle in the family Cerambycidae. It was described by Karl-Ernst Hüdepohl in 1995.
