= Desisopsis =

Scientific classification
- Domain: Eukaryota
- Kingdom: Animalia
- Phylum: Arthropoda
- Class: Insecta
- Order: Coleoptera
- Suborder: Polyphaga
- Infraorder: Cucujiformia
- Family: Cerambycidae
- Tribe: Pteropliini
- Genus: Desisopsis; Hüdepohl, 1995

Genus of beetles

Desisopsis is a genus of longhorn beetles of the subfamily Lamiinae, containing the following species:

- Desisopsis maculata Hüdepohl, 1995
- Desisopsis magallanesorum Vives, 2013
- Desisopsis lanlayroni Barševskis, 2016
