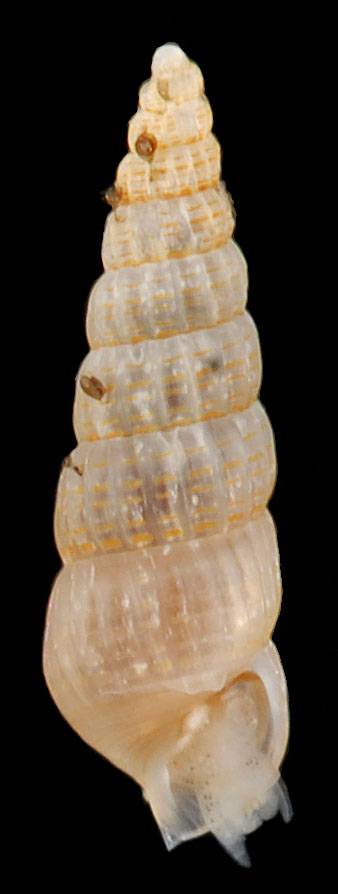

Scientific classification
- Kingdom: Animalia
- Phylum: Mollusca
- Class: Gastropoda
- Family: Pyramidellidae
- Genus: Turbonilla
- Species: T. powhatani

Binomial name
- Turbonilla powhatani Henderson & Bartsch, 1914

= Turbonilla powhatani =

Species of gastropod

Turbonilla powhatani is a species of sea snail, a marine gastropod mollusk in the family Pyramidellidae, the pyrams and their allies.

== Distribution ==
This species occurs in the following locations:

- North West Atlantic

== Notes ==
Additional information regarding this species:

- Distribution: Range: 37.9°N; 75.5°W. Distribution: USA: Virginia
