= Dactylothrips =

Scientific classification
- Kingdom: Animalia
- Phylum: Arthropoda
- Class: Insecta
- Order: Thysanoptera
- Family: Phlaeothripidae
- Genus: Dactylothrips; Bagnall, 1923

Synonyms
- Hannibalia Girault, 1928

Genus of thrips

Dactylothrips is a genus of thrips in the family Phlaeothripidae.

== Species ==
- Dactylothrips aenictus
- Dactylothrips ascius
- Dactylothrips atherodes
- Dactylothrips augusta
- Dactylothrips australis
- Dactylothrips boidion
- Dactylothrips bos
- Dactylothrips chaitis
- Dactylothrips dactylis
- Dactylothrips dens
- Dactylothrips digitulus
- Dactylothrips distichus
- Dactylothrips duplicatus
- Dactylothrips fragosus
- Dactylothrips giraulti
- Dactylothrips junix
- Dactylothrips kosmos
- Dactylothrips marsupium
- Dactylothrips papyricola
- Dactylothrips phascolus
- Dactylothrips phoxus
- Dactylothrips precarius
- Dactylothrips priscus
- Dactylothrips racemus
- Dactylothrips rectus
- Dactylothrips skolops
- Dactylothrips taediosus
- Dactylothrips tasmani
- Dactylothrips turba
- Dactylothrips vescus
- Dactylothrips yalgoo
