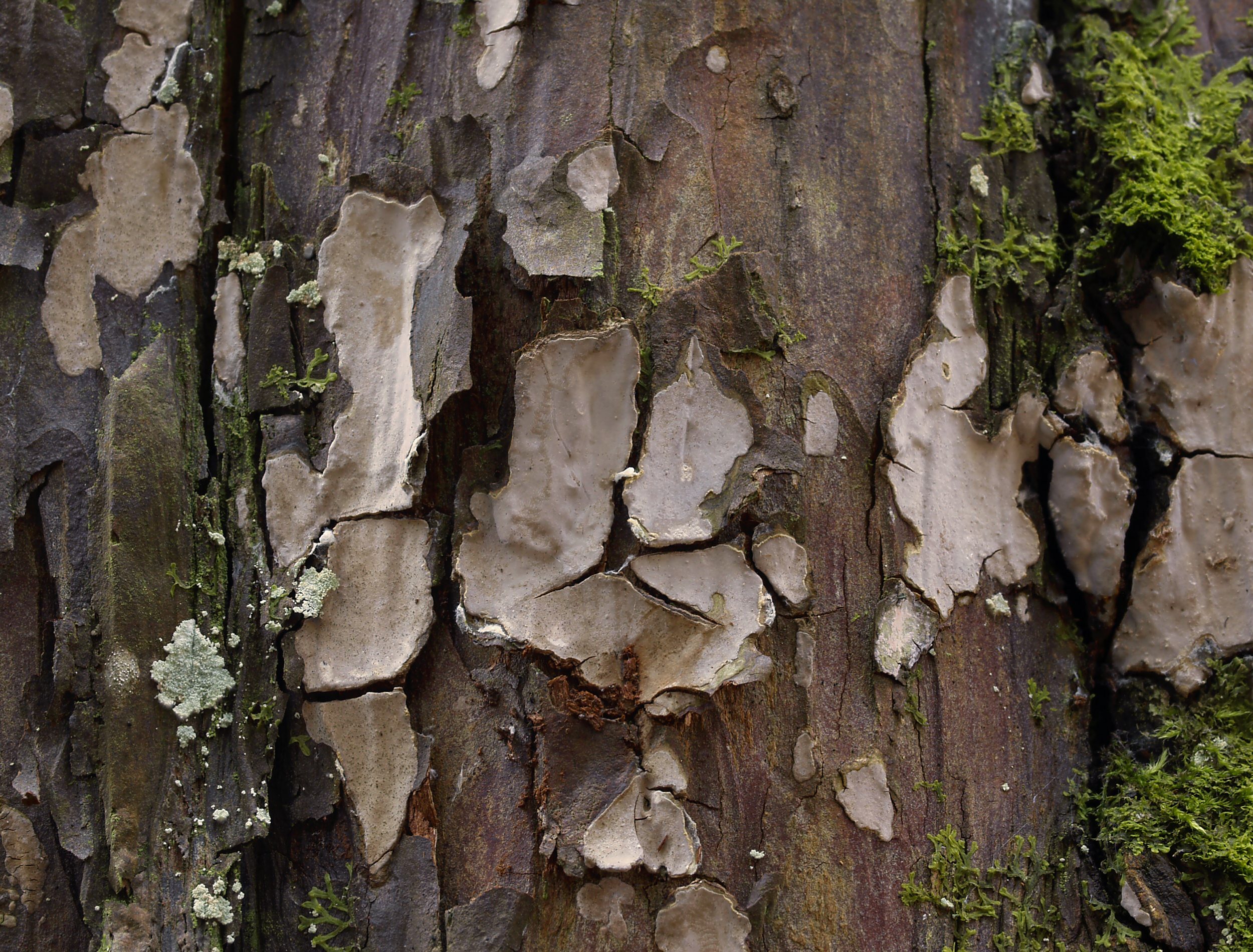
- Amylostereum laevigatum
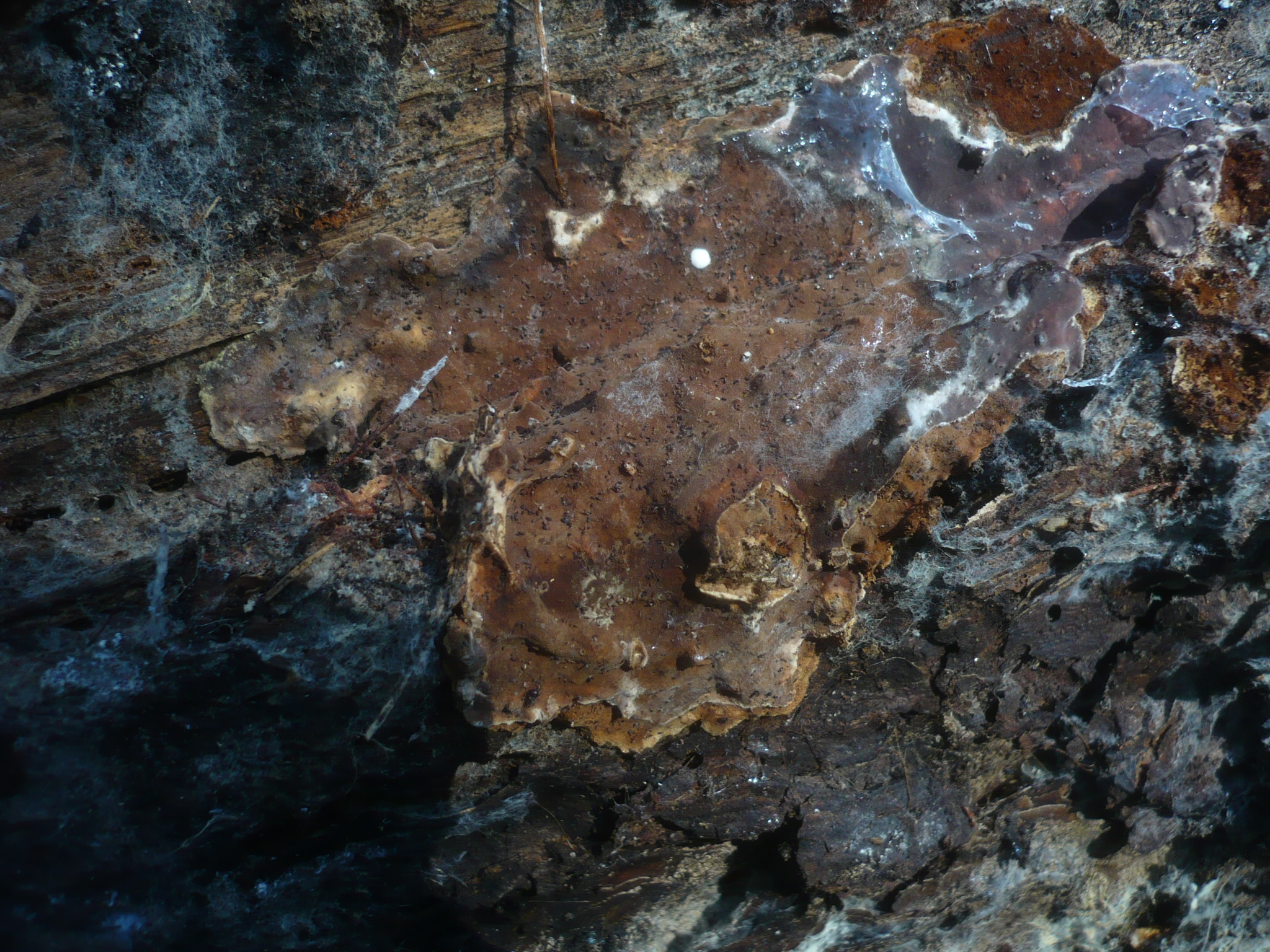
- Amylostereum areolatum

Scientific classification
- Kingdom: Fungi
- Division: Basidiomycota
- Class: Agaricomycetes
- Order: Russulales
- Family: Amylostereaceae; Boidin, Mugnier & Canales (1998)
- Genus: Amylostereum; Boidin (1958)

Type species
- Amylostereum chailletii (Pers.) Boidin (1958)

Species
- Amylostereum areolatum Amylostereum chailletii Amylostereum ferreum Amylostereum laevigatum

Synonyms
- Trichocarpus P.Karst. (1889); Lloydellopsis Pouzar (1959)

= Amylostereum =

Genus of fungi

Amylostereum is the single genus in the fungal family Amylostereaceae. The genus currently comprises four saprotrophic and parasitic species, which live off living or dead wood. The Amylostereaceae cause white rot in the wood by disintegrating the tissue component lignin. They produce crust-like, partially wavy fruit bodies on the surface of infested trees, which are similar to those produced by Stereum species.

There are four described species in the Amylostereaceae: A. chailletii (the type), A. areolatum, A. ferreum and A. laevigatum. The species were initially considered part of Stereum until mycologist Jacques Boidin found atypical microscopic differences between them. Forty years after his extensive researches from 1958, Boidin reclassified Amylostereum into its own family.

Three Amylostereum species are symbionts of wood wasps in the genera Sirex, Urocerus, and Xoanon, which infest conifers. The female wood wasps deposit their eggs together with fungal spores and mucus in trees, and the fungus is eaten by the wasp's larva as food. The fungus propagates vegetatively through the formation of asexual spores in newly emerged females that are stored in special structures adapted for the transport of symbiotic fungi. The A. areolatum–Sirex noctilio symbiont complex has been studied extensively because of its potential to cause substantial economic losses in the forestry industry, particularly in non-native regions.

== Taxonomy and history of research ==
Amylostereaceae species were for a long time classified in the genus Stereum, based primary on the layered structure of the fruit body and the similar physiological activity. Mycologist Jacques Boidin separated Amylosterum from Stereum in 1958, justifying this decision by explaining that microscopic differences such as amyloid spores and encrusted cystidia were sufficiently distinct to warrant recognition as a new genus. Although the type species of the genus (today called A. chailletii) was initially named Trichocarpus ambiguus, the name Trichocarpus had already been used for a genus in the flowering plant family Malvaceae. Boidin thus chose the genus name Amylostereum, referring to the amyloid spores.

Based on DNA analysis, Boidin in 1998 moved Amylostereum into a new, monotypic family, the Amylostereaceae, which he attributed to the Hericiales order. Later studies, however, supported the initial classification in the Russulales.

=== Classification ===
The classification of the Amylostereaceae is not completely resolved. The next closest relatives might be – depending on the research – either Echinodontium tinctorium and most other species of the genus Echinodontium, or Artomyces pyxidatus. Most of the previous DNA analysis results suggest a narrow relation to Echinodontium, but several results of studies partially contradict this conclusion. Only the classification to the Russulales is regarded as correct. Some authors have suggested that Amylostereum should be placed in the family Echinodontiaceae.

- - A. areolatum
  - - A. chailletii
    - - A. ferreum
      - Amylostereum sp.
      - A. laevigatum

Internal classification of Amylostereum according to Slippers et al. 2000

The similarities between A. chailletii and A. areolatum have caused some confusion regarding their placement in the genus. As only the size of their fruit bodies differ from each other in appearance, researcher German Josef Krieglsteiner assumed that both are the same species in different age stages. Experiments with pure cultures of the fungi, however, showed that the mycelia of A. chailletii, A. laevigatum and A. ferreum were partially compatible to each other, but the mycelium of A. areolatum was incompatible to other species. Boidin believes that the common ancestor of all Amylostereum fungi used yellowwoods as a host. This genus of conifers was native in Europe until the Paleogene and Neogene Periods (66 million to 2.6 million years ago), but became extinct there, so the Amylostereum fungi specialized on other conifers and differentiated into several species. Only A. ferreum specialized on yellowwoods in South America.

Compatibility tests as well as molecular analysis indicated that A. areolatum separated very early from other Amylostereum fungi. The other three species separated later from each other and are thus partially compatible to each other. A. ferreum and A. laevigatum produced in 59% of all cases a common mycelium, A. ferreum and A. chailletii only in 44%. There is an undescribed species in Amylostereum; according to DNA analysis, it stands between A. laevigatum and A. ferreum. This is remarkable, as these fungi originated from Mycetangae (storing organs of Platypodinae) of a North American wood wasp, while A. laevigatum has never been seen as symbiont of wood wasps, neither in North American nor in Europe. The fungus possibly represents a separated species or a subtaxon of A. laevigatum. As A. areolatum and A. chailletii mainly reproduce asexually through the symbiosis of wood wasps, the genetic variability within these species is relatively low.

== Description ==
=== Macroscopic ===
The Amylostereaceae produce crust-like, dry and leathery-corky fruit bodies on the bark of infested trees. The fruit bodies are 0.5–1.5 mm (0.02–0.06 in) thick, irregularly shaped and are able to cover a large surface on the bark or otherwise can appear as small spots. They lie directly on the bark. The ochrous, grey or brownish fruit body (hymenium) has a smooth to warty surface texture and is turned outwards. It is bordered by a highly bent and wavy (effuso-reflex) edge on all species except A. laevigatum, which has a churlish surface (a tomentum) and is usually dirty-brown coloured. In some species, the tomentum stands clearly above and forms a kind of roof above the fruit body; if it completely surrounds this roof, there might appear cuplike shapes.

=== Microscopic ===
The Amylostereaceae possess a dimitic trama, meaning that there are in its mycelia two kinds of hyphae. The first type is brownish skeletal hyphae, which provide stability to the fruit body. These hyphae run parallel to the bark and often have hairpin-like turns, so that the loops form thick-walled, cystidium-like structures, the so-called pseudocystidia. The second type is generative hyphae. They are translucent (hyaline) and serve to promote the growth of the fungus. Genuine cystidia arise in the hymenium and the layer directly below, the subhymenium. Both pseudocystidia and cystidia are encrusted, meaning that they feature crystal-like structures on the top.

With the exception of A. laevigatum, all species have a thin separating layer, the cortex, between the hymenium and the tomentum. A cortex is also present on many Stereum fungi (on a broader front) and serves to bend up the fruit body. As this cortex is missing on A. laevigatum, its fruit body lies flat on the bark.

The basidia are 15–25 × 3.5–5.5 μm and have a slim, club-like shape. Each basidium features four sterigmata, each of which bear one spore. The spores' shape is slimly ellipsoidal or cylindrical. Their surface is smooth and their walls are thin. Although they are colourless and hyaline, the spores are amyloid, meaning they will turn bluish or purple when stained with Melzer's reagent. This characteristic differs from other very similar species, and this gave the genus its name.

== Distribution ==
The range of the Amylostereaceae originally comprised only Holarctic regions, including North America and Eurasia, and the Neotropics, with Central and South America. The introduction of A. areolatum and its symbionts, the Sirex woodwasps, saw the spread of the genus to all continents except Antarctica.

Amylostereum chailletiiz is common in the temperate regions of North America and Eurasia. A. laevigatum can be also found in temperate Eurasia, but it is unclear how broadly this species is distributed in North America. A. areolatum is originally native in North Africa and Eurasia; it was however distributed through the 20th century in Australia, New Zealand, Southern Africa as well as in South and North America. Only A. ferreum is originally native in the tropics and is common in Brazil and the Caribbean.

== Ecology ==
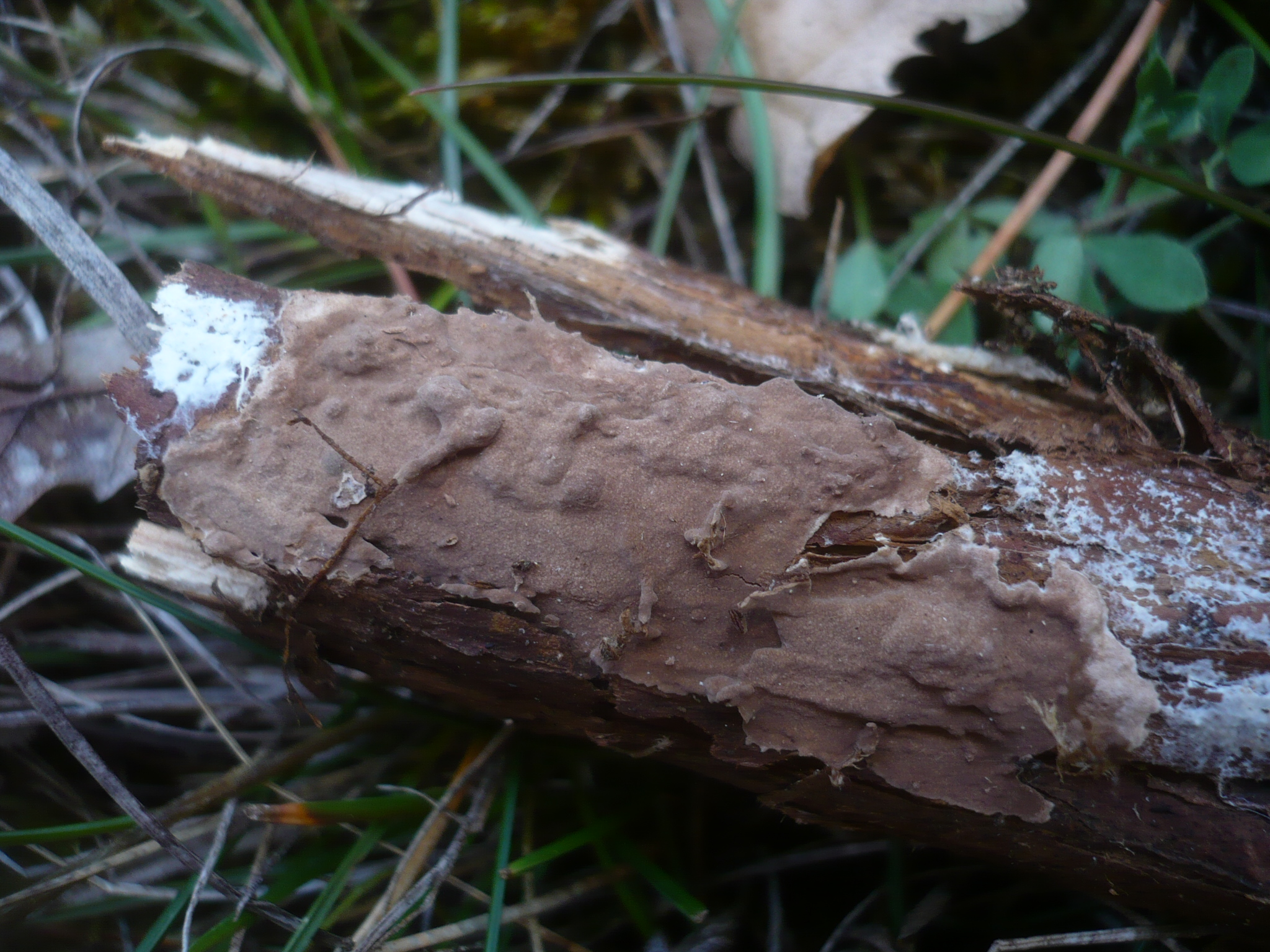
Amylostereum laevigatum on fallen juniper

Amylostereaceae usually infest only dead or cut down conifer wood. Three species – A. areolatum, A. laevigatum and A. chailletii – may also establish a symbiosis with wood wasps (Siricidae), which beside freshly logged trees also infest living trees and infect them with fungi. Symbioses have been recorded with several species: Sirex noctilio, S. juvencus, S. nitobei, S. cyaneus, S. edwarsii, S. nitidus, and, in Japan, Urocerus antennatus and Xoanon matsumurae. Wasps of the genera Sirex and Urocerus store oidia (the hypha of fungi split up to spores) in special abdominal organs. The wood wasps infect trees by splashing a phytotoxic secretion below the bark and at the same time injecting fungal spores into the hole. The secretion weakens the tree and temporarily diminishes its immune system, whereby the fungus can spread along the xylem. The infection with Amylostereaceae fulfill two functions for the wasps: it provides the larvae food, because the white rot softens the wood; at the same time, the mycelia of the fungi serves as food for the larvae. After the larvae pupate, it absorbs the mycelia of the Amylostereaceae into its body to oviposit together with its eggs. The fungus benefits from the symbiosis as it spreads faster and more effectively than through airborne spores and furthermore does not need to develop fruit bodies. A. ferreum is the only Amylosterum species that has not been associated with any woodwasps.

=== Host spectrum ===
The host spectrum of the Amylostereaceae comprises several, partially very different genera of Coniferae. A. chailletii usually infests Pinaceae such as firs (Abies) and spruces (Picea), but also cedars (Cedrus) and Douglas firs (Pseudotsuga). A. areolatum has a similar host spectrum, which uses mainly firs, Japanese cedars (Cryptomeria), larches (Larix), spruces, pines (Pinus) and Douglas firs as hosts. While spruces dominate as hosts in the native habitat, this species is more common in pines on other locations. The host spectrum of A. laevigatum comprises Cupressaceae such as junipers (Juniperus) or cypresses (Cupressus) and the English yew (Taxus baccata). A. ferreum is, however, only common on neotropic yellowwoods (Podocarpus).

=== Symptoms of infestation ===
The Amylostereaceae are white rot pathogens. They disintegrate the lignin of the host wood, whereby the infested wood parts become less stable and take a fibrous structure. The wood bleaches as fungal enzymes break down and remove the brown-pigmented lignin. The distribution in wood takes place mainly along the transport channels in the xylem. If the wood is crosscut, the red rot is vertically positioned, on which bleached, infested areas contrast with intact wood. Symptoms of infestion by the symbiotic partner—wood wasps—include circular exit holes in the crust and acute stress through dryness, common in hanging, falling or tanning needles.

== Ecological and economical importance ==
In their native habitat, all Amylostereum species have a minor importance as forest pests. The infestation through wood wasps does not assume greater dimensions and is, compared with other pests, almost insignificant. The infection rates are even lower during sexual reproduction via fruit bodies, as the wasps do not play a part in the process. Furthermore, the Amylostereum fungi are alone often incapable of infesting healthy trees. They thus mostly act as saprobiontics. Pine monocultures in Australia, New Zealand, Africa and South America were shown to be susceptible to the Sirex woodwasp (Sirex noctilio), which was introduced there and which is associated with A. areolatum. The wasp's phytotoxic secretion, its larvae and the fungus combine very effectively with each other and contribute to forest decline rates of up to 80%. This is mainly owing to the poor water and nutrient supply of the trees, which can poorly reconcile the drought stress caused by infestation. S. noctilio was detected in North America in the 2000s (decade); in Canada alone, the total economic loss to the forestry industry caused by the Sirex–Amylostereum symbiosis could be as high as $254 million per year for the next 20 years.

As a countermeasure, cultures of the nematode Deladenus siricidicola have been used as biological control to protect trees since the 1980s. This parasite feeds on the mycelia of A. areolatum and is therefore a food competitor of wood wasp larvae. Where S. noctilio larvae are present, the parasite infects and sterilizes the eggs of female wasps, causing them to be infertile. These infertile females lay infected eggs into new trees and thus spread the nematode. This control method has proven to be relatively successful to combat the Sirex–Amylostereum complex. In the Southern Hemisphere, where the technique has been widely employed, reductions of parasitism levels of 70%–100% have been achieved.
