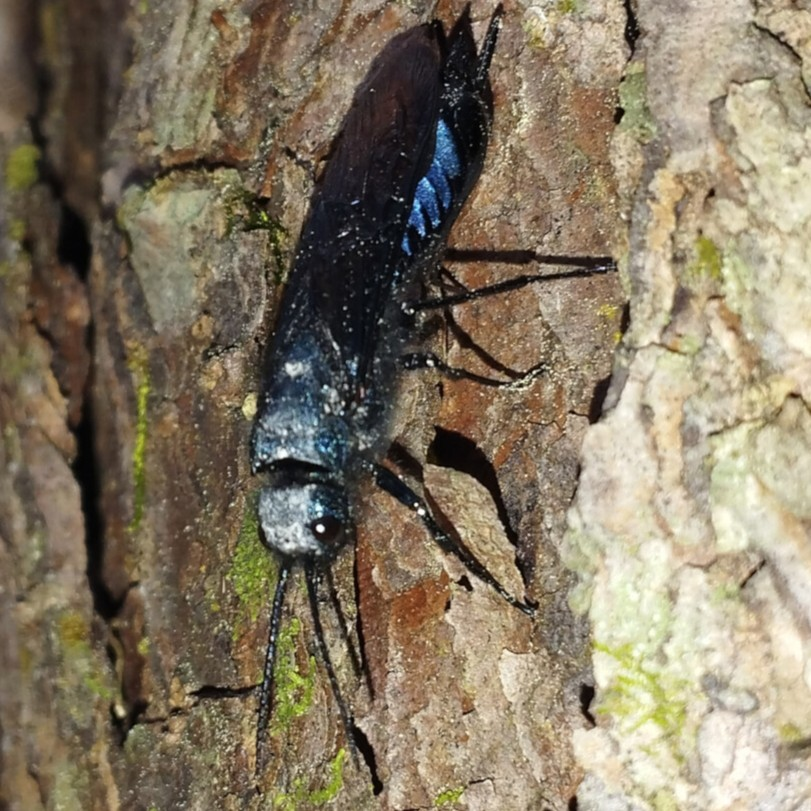

Scientific classification
- Kingdom: Animalia
- Phylum: Arthropoda
- Clade: Pancrustacea
- Class: Insecta
- Order: Hymenoptera
- Family: Siricidae
- Genus: Sirex
- Species: S. obesus

Binomial name
- Sirex obesus Bradley, 1913

= Sirex obesus =

Species of wood wasp

Sirex obesus is a species of woodwasp that is a pest of pine trees. Its native range includes the Southwestern United States, Northern Mexico, and Central Mexico. It was reported as an invasive species after being found in Brazil on pine plantations in São Paulo and Minas Gerais.

== Description ==
Females range in size from 1.3 to 2.8 cm (0.51 to 1.10 in). Their body, legs, and antennae are black with dark blue metallic reflections. The forewings are also dark in color and lack the 3A vein. The ovipositor is relatively short only extending 2–3 mm past the cornus (a triangular structure on the last abdominal segment) and is covered by two sheaths which open laterally during oviposition. S. obesus and S. californicus are very similar in appearance but can be distinguished by pit density dorsally in the head.

The male's head, thorax, and antennae are black with dark blue metallic reflections similar to the female, however their final abdominal segments and all but the first of their leg segments are a reddish brown. Their forewings have a yellow tint.

== Biology ==
Many species of the genus Pinus have been reported as hosts including P. caribea, P. teocote, and many hybrid species. In its native range the wasp targets trees that are already weakened or diseased, however outside of its native range it will also target healthy trees.

S. obesus has a obligatory symbiotic relationship with the fungus Amylostereum chailletii and rarely Amylostereum areolatum. The females store arthrospores of the fungus in a specialized structure on their abdomens called mycangia. Females oviposit into the wood by drilling holes where they will then deposit eggs along with phytotoxic mucus and the fungal spores. The fungus will then feed on the wood of the tree and the S. obesus larvae will then feed on the fungus. Adults emerge from October to December. The phytotoxin and fungi will typically kill the tree in as little as 3 to 4 months after oviposition.

Ibalia leucospoides has been documented as a parasitoid of the species.

== Economic impact ==
While it is considered of little economic impact in its native range, this species could cause issues in South America as an invasive species similarly to S. noctillo. S. obesus has been reported to cause up to 73% tree mortality in some stands. It is speculated that the species could spread to all major pine plantations in Brazil within the next two decades.
