= Spruce–fir forests =

Spruce forest

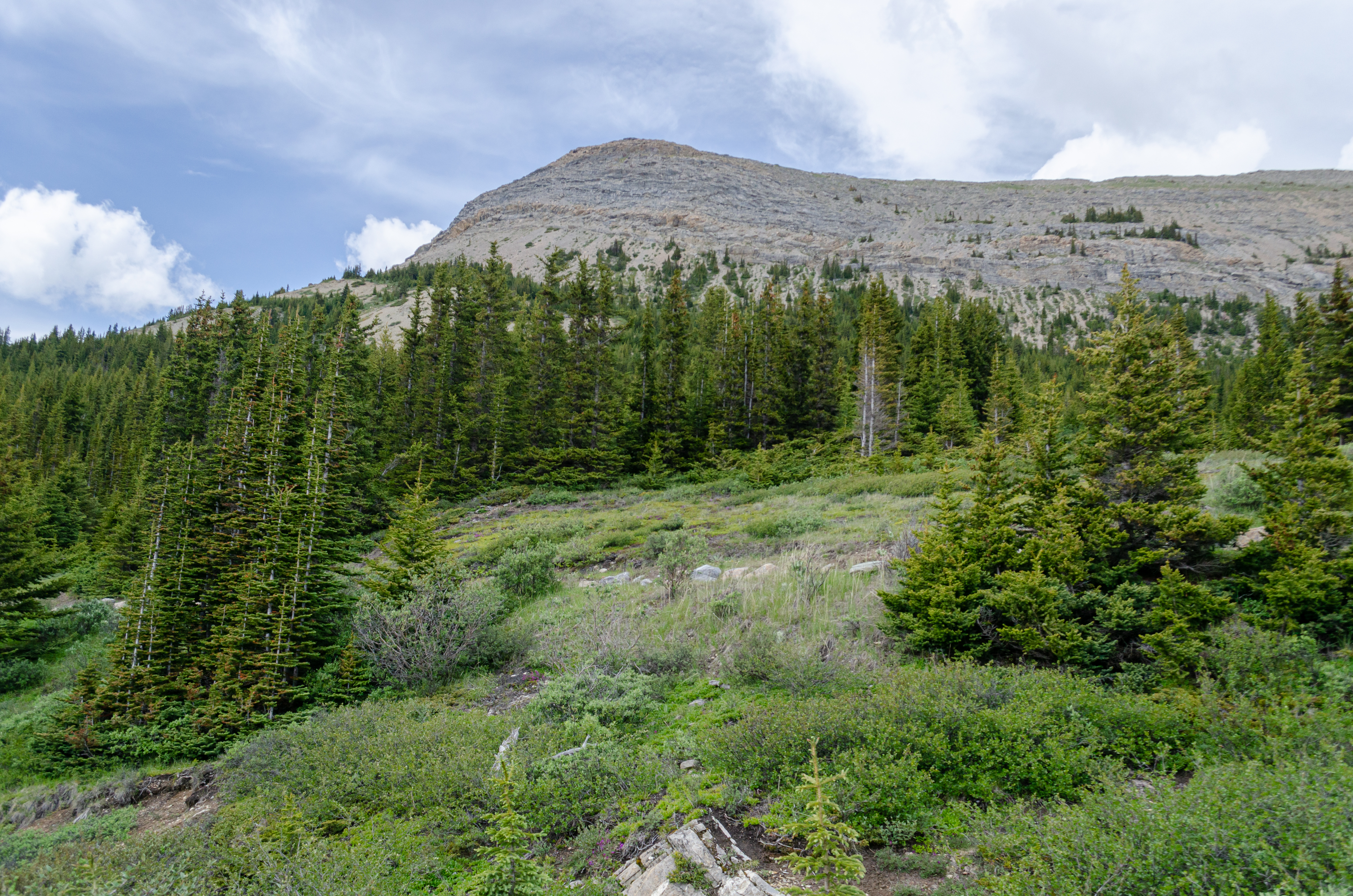
Spruce-fir forest in the Canadian Rockies

Spruce–fir forests are type of forest found in the Northern Hemisphere dominated by spruce and fir trees. These forests are often considered to be climax forests, with the two main tree genera able to reproduce in their own shade.

== Distribution ==
Spruce–fir forests can be found in cold regions at high latitudes or high altitudes throughout the Northern Hemisphere. This includes both areas throughout the high latitude boreal forest of Canada and Russia, as well as mountain ranges at lower latitudes, such as the Rocky Mountains in North America, the Tian Shan in Asia, and the Carpathian Mountains in Europe.

Spruce-fir forests are found in generally cold climates, with cold winters and cool summers. For example, in the southern Appalachian Mountains, spruce-fir forests were found in a range of mean July temperatures from 13 °C at treeline, to 17 °C at the spruce-fir/deciduous forest ecotone.

== Examples and characteristics ==
Forests of the Southern Appalachian Mountains had covered approximately 140 square kilometres (54 sq mi) on peaks and ranges. Today this forest type occupies less than 70 square kilometres (27 sq mi). Much of this forest loss is due to logging, followed by slash fires. The Waterrock Knob fire was composed of different group of plant species than are normally found in burned spruce and fir forests. The tree layer of this stand consists of fewer than expected stems and has low basal area. The shrub layer is very dense, which may reduce successful tree reproduction. The herbaceous layer growth is not typical of young, disturbed spruce and fir stands. These vegetation characteristics suggest that possibly a hot fire in conjunction with a steep rocky slope and shallow soils have been some of the reasons for the reduced development of a typical spruce and fir stand. Burned soil has been an important factor in determining earlier and present vegetation patterns and species composition.

== Yellowstone fire effects study ==
Post fire effects of the western United States forests include an important study of the fire of Yellowstone National Park in 1988. Historically, controlled burns had been utilized to thin forests. By the 1970s, Yellowstone started a natural fire management plan to allow the process of lightning caused fires to continue influencing wild land succession. In 1988, 248 fires were started in Yellowstone National Park. As for the animals that were killed by the fires, the U.S National Park Service tallied 345 elk, 36 deer, 12 moose, 6 black bears, 9 bison and 1 grizzly bear. Fish were also killed due to heated water. Surveys indicated that less than 1% of the soils were heated enough to burn below ground plant seeds and roots. The U.S Congress launched a massive study of the long term ecological effects caused by the Yellowstone fires. The short term effects proved most wildlife populations showed no effects or rebounded quickly. In the years following the fire, precipitation combined with short term ash and nutrient influx led to a stunning display of wild flowers on the burned areas.

== Effects of fire ==
Because plants are immobile, they must develop resistances to disturbances through natural selection. Individual plant species vary their resistance to fire injury in predictable ways. These resistances make it possible for the biodiversity to greatly increase during recolonization after a fire. Studies show that in a spruce and fir forest, eleven years after a fire, there is a greater diversity of herbs than in a community where there was no fire. The shrubs took longer to regenerate but soon there was greater diversity in the shrub population as well. Spruce and fir forests have a greater biodiversity than most other forests because of their multiple layers of canopy and dense understories. This creates a heterogeneous, diverse stand structure which leads to an assortment of fire types which usually leave patches of unburned trees. Because the soil is oxidized by the fire, seed germination is encouraged. Also, many herb species were present in burned areas but not areas that were unaffected by fire. Fir and spruce trees are wind-dispersed, so the number of regenerated trees depends on the distance from the unburned stands to the sample location.

== Spruce and fir regeneration ==
The time it takes for fir and spruce to regenerate varies greatly, but it takes a number of years if no roots or snags remain. Regeneration time depends on a number of environmental factors, such as species type, wind strength, and aspect. It may be much more difficult for fir and spruce to be established on a slope, not only because of the dispersion technique, but also because erosion is greatly increased by fire, making it harder for the seeds to take root. Also, fir and spruce differ in survival techniques. Fir uses rapid growth, short lifespan, and easy establishment to come back more quickly after a fire, while spruce relies on longer lifespan and larger basal area to survive. Spruce has a much lower establishment rate, but the larger basal area increases its chances of survival and allows it to regenerate by both wind dispersion and growth from the roots remaining after a fire. The result is that fir and spruce repopulate the site contemporaneously, although most of the initial biomass is dominated by fir and later on the dominance shifts to spruce. Recurrent high-intensity crown fire also helps spruce and fir forests by preventing fir from overtaking spruce through competitive exclusion. Because spruce is shade-intolerant, it requires an open canopy to be established. This means that without fire to wipe out fir trees, thus creating holes in the canopy, spruce would be outcompeted by fir.

== Fire, insect, fungus and worm threats ==
Fire has an interesting relationship with micro fauna in forests. Damage done to trees by fire damages the vascular cambium, thus leaving trees more susceptible to insectivorous and fungal attacks. Fungal infections are not as common as insect attacks, but can be just as deadly. The fungus Amylostereum areolatum weakens trees and allows insects such as the Sirex noctilio (European wood wasp) to take over massive numbers of forests. The most common problems in spruce and fir forests are bark beetles, budworms, and gall-forming insects, to which spruce is extremely susceptible. Several gall-forming insects are present in spruce forests, including the Eastern Spruce gall adelgid and the Cooley's Spruce gall adelgid, which normally would not harm forests, unless the trees are unusually vulnerable to them, as they are after a fire. Budworm larvae feed on the leaves of spruce and fir trees, and can become present in large amounts, which is when they become detrimental to a forest. Bark beetles are the most common insect killer of spruce and fir forests because they can spread quickly, breed rapidly, and can easily devour thousands of acres before actions can be taken against them. During the 1990s, the bark beetles affected almost three million acres (12,000 km^{2}) of spruce forests. The attacks of these insects, in turn, raise the mortality rate of trees in the burn area, which provides even more fuel for the next fire.

== Fauna ==
A number of larger animals are supported by fir and spruce forests, such as moose, deer, elk, birds, snowshoe hares, and other small mammals. Effects on bird populations after fire in fir and spruce forests varied. Of the 41 avian species observed in 3 or more studies comparing post fire and adjacent unburned forests, 22% are consistently more abundant in burned forests and 34% are more abundant in unburned forests. In general, woodpeckers and aerial foragers are more abundant in burned forests and foliage grazing species are more abundant in unburned forests. Within the spruce and fir community type, trees often lose their lower branches, becoming unavailable to hare and other small mammals for food or cover during the seven to nine months of winter. This makes larger mammals more densely populated in fir and spruce forests. Fire does not displace fauna that are dependent on fir and spruce forests. When fir and spruce begin sprouting, they are utilized for food and the patches of trees remaining provides shelter. Because of the heterogeneity in fir and spruce forests, patches of trees are always left in nature. Fire suppression, on the other hand, alters the natural patch dynamics, thus greatly reducing the number of mammals present. The trees all grow older, close the canopy, the understory is repressed, branches fall off during the winter, and for the majority of the year there is no available food. Also, if fire is suppressed for a number of years and then a crown fire breaks out in the area, it will quickly spread throughout the dense canopy. No patches will be left for shelter and the fir and spruce will take much longer to regenerate because of the distance from the remaining stands to the center of the burned site.

== See also ==
- Southern Appalachian spruce-fir forest
