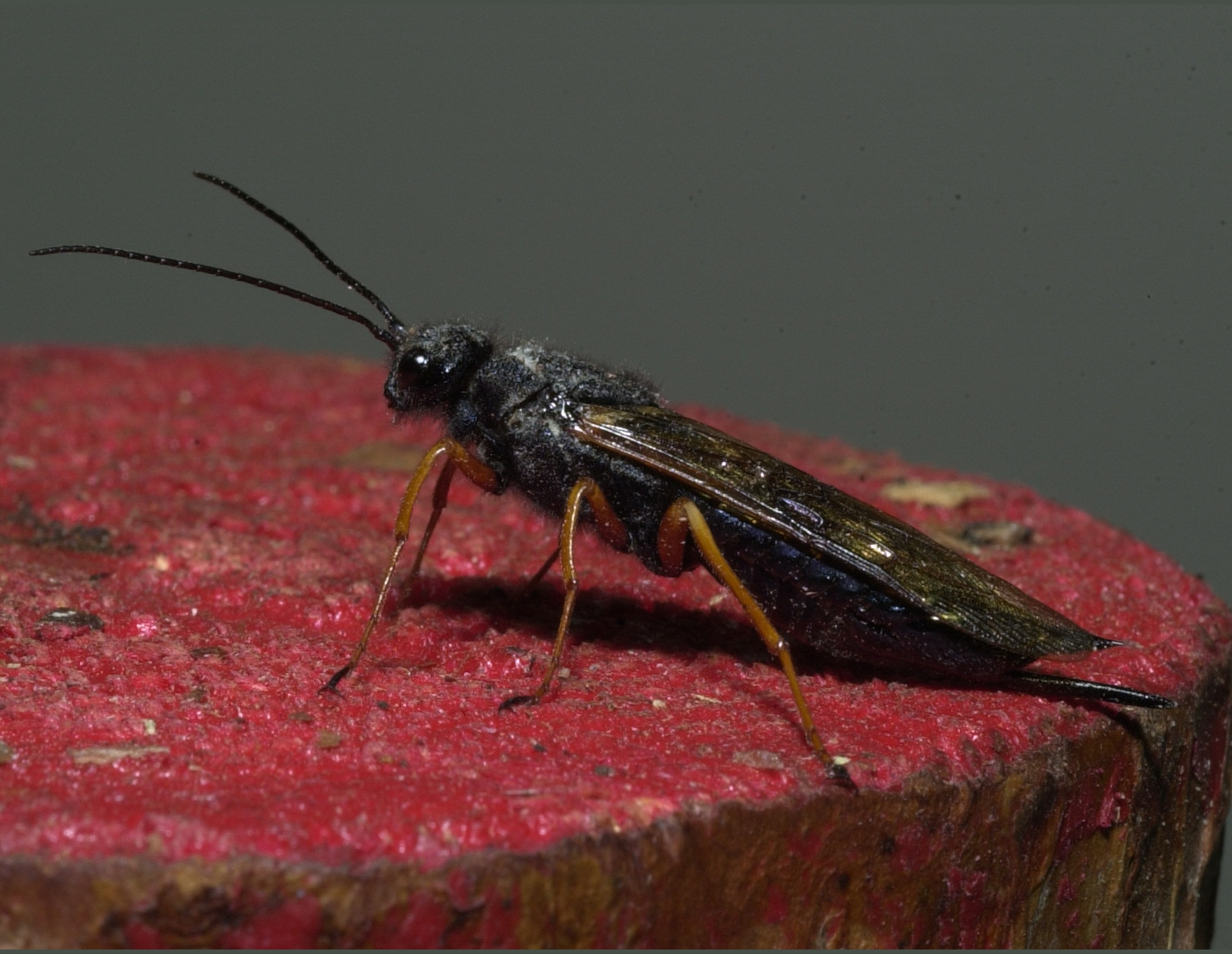
- Female

Scientific classification
- Kingdom: Animalia
- Phylum: Arthropoda
- Clade: Pancrustacea
- Class: Insecta
- Order: Hymenoptera
- Family: Siricidae
- Genus: Sirex
- Species: S. noctilio

Binomial name
- Sirex noctilio Fabricius, 1793

= Sirex noctilio =

Species of sawfly

Sirex noctilio, known as the Midnight woodwasp, European woodwasp, European horntail woodwasp, or sirex woodwasp, (Note: A name also applied to other species in the genus.) is a species of woodwasp, native to Europe, Asia, and northern Africa. Adults vary in length from 9 to 36 mm (3/8 to 1 3/8 in).

This woodwasp is an invasive species in many parts of the world, including Australia, New Zealand, North America, South America, and South Africa, where it has become a significant economic pest of pine trees. The wasp can attack a wide variety of pine species, although some species seem to be more susceptible than others, and stressed trees often are attacked.

During oviposition, the female wasp lays two eggs with or without a mucoid substance and a symbiotic fungus for the larvae to feed on once they hatch. The mucoid substance is toxic to trees and aids in tree decline. The arthrospores from the symbiotic fungus, Amylostereum areolatum, are also pathogenic.

== Characteristics ==
=== Adult ===
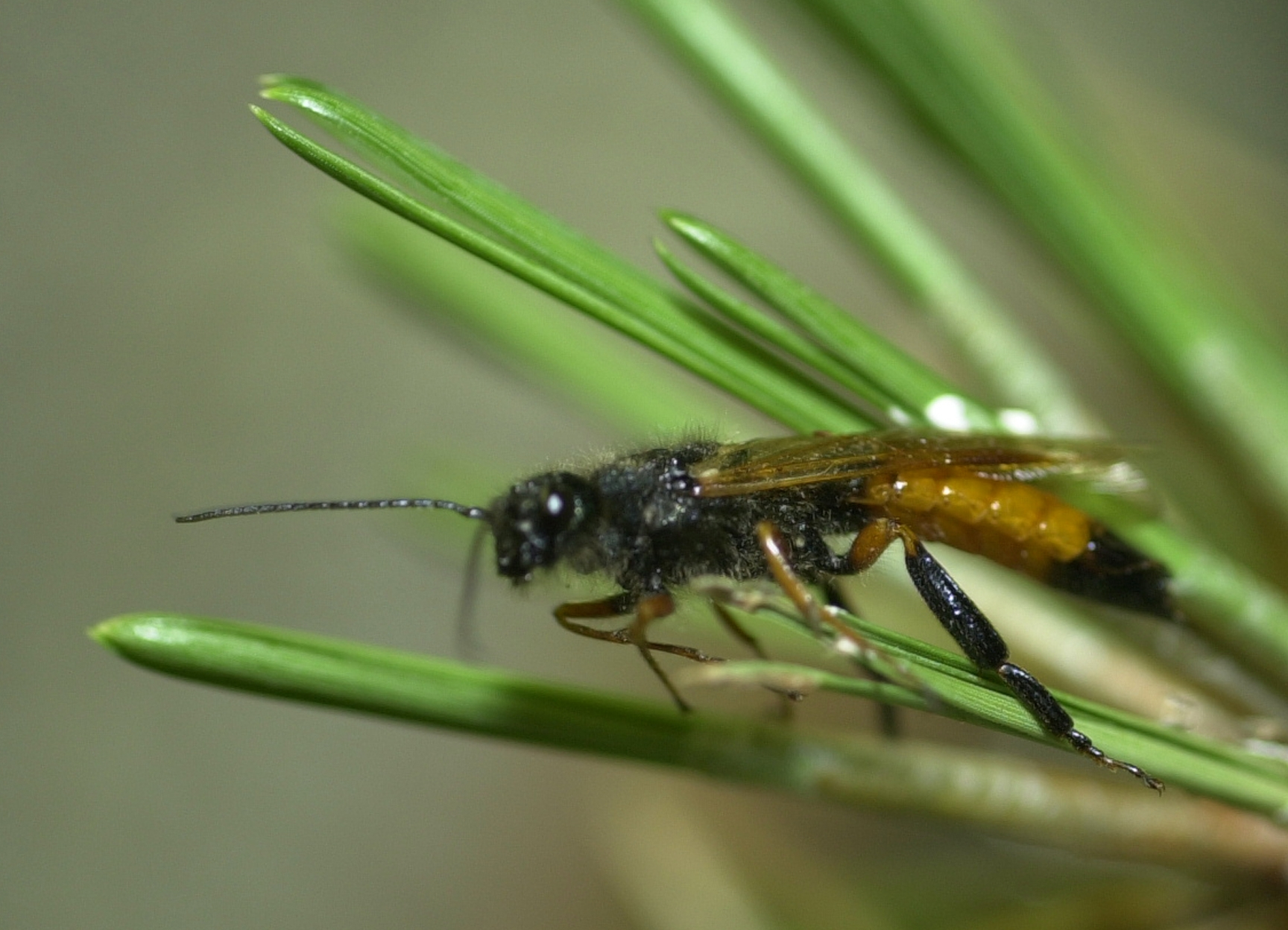
Male with orange middle segments of the abdomen and black back legs

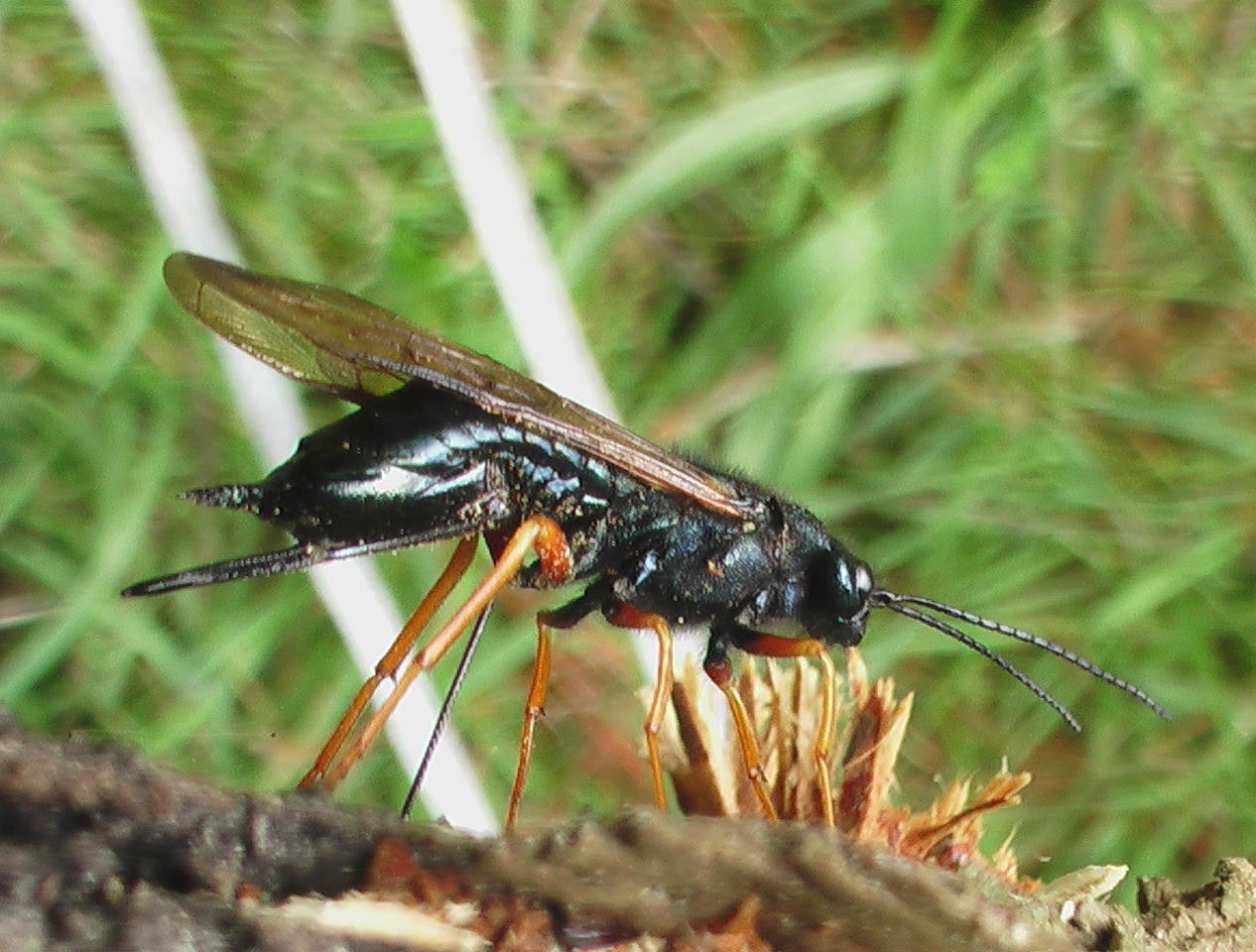
Steel-blue female with the hidden ovipositor

The European woodwasp has a sturdy, cylindrical body without a waist, but with a pointed abdomen. The female body is 15–36 mm (5/8–1 3/8 in), and the male is 9–32 mm (3/8–1 1/4 in) long. Both sexes have long, black, bristle-shaped antennae, which are rather close together.

The body of the male is black, except for the orange middle part of the abdomen. The wings are yellowish-translucent and the antennae are black. The front pair of legs have a yellowish-orange colour, the back pair is heavily thickened and is coloured black on the posterior splint and tarsus, while the femur is orange.

The females are iron blue, and have orange legs and black antennae. This is a notable distinction from S. juvencus, which has red antennae. The females also have yellowish wings, though browner than the male's wings. The ovipositor is below the tapering tip of the abdomen, and is strengthened with zinc to aid drilling into wood. The sting is connected with the mycetangia, which are special organs on the abdomen, where the female stores the oidiae (asexual fungus spores), from broken segments of hyphae. These spores are deposited, together with the eggs, in the host tree wood to germinate. Both larvae and adults have strong mandibles and can drill through lead plates.

=== Larva ===
The larvae of the European woodwasp are almost colourless and only have three stub-shaped pairs of sterna. They cut through host wood with their powerful mandibles. They have a pointed, dark tip at their rear end, which presses the drilling dust on the walls of the borehole. They closely resemble other larvae in the genus Sirex. A detailed description of the larva of this species was first given in 2021.

== Native and introduced range ==
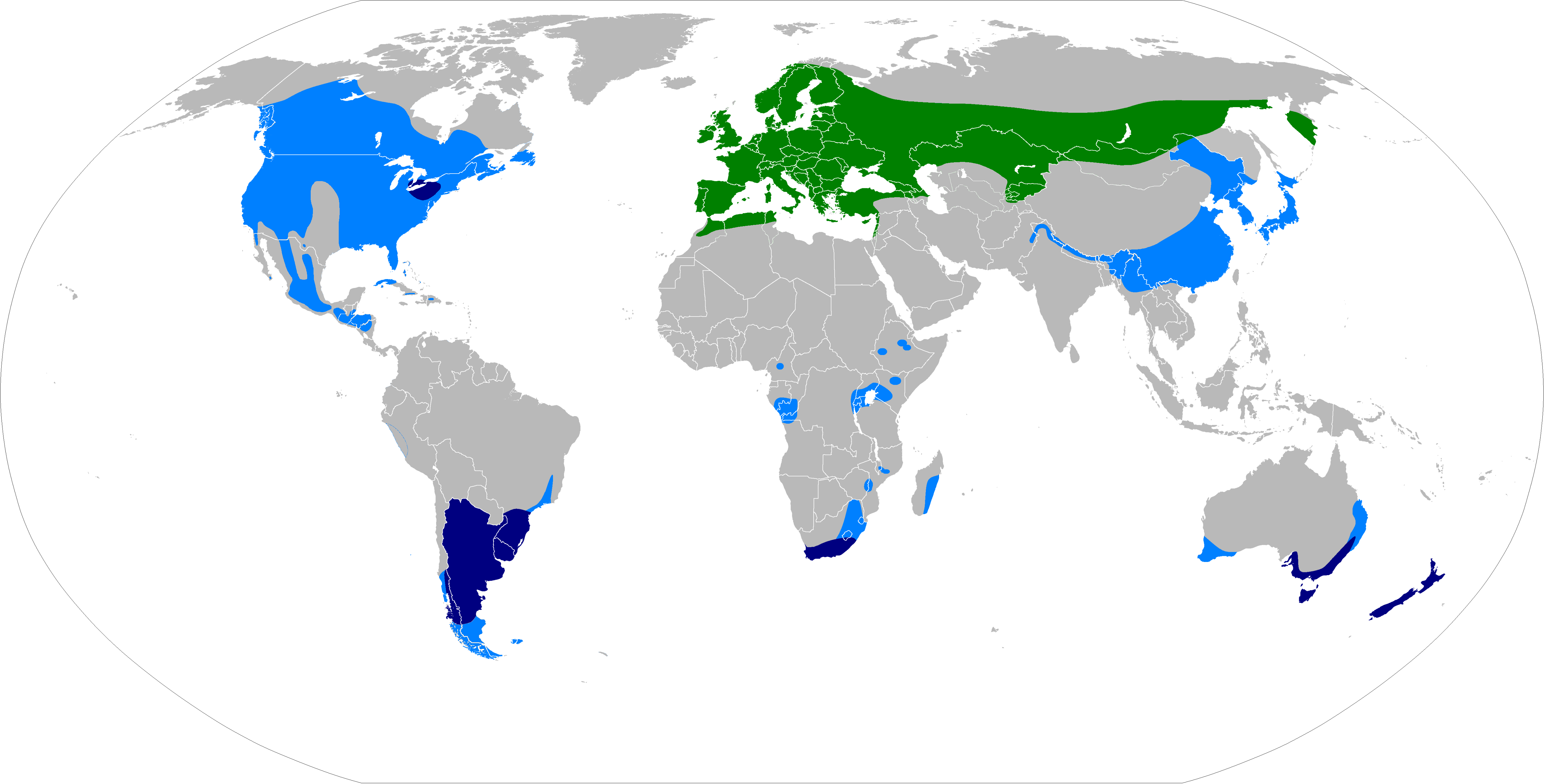
Habitat of Sirex noctilio Native habitat Introduced Predicted future habitat

The native habitat of the European woodwasp is the temperate Palearctic realm, ranging from Maghreb in northwest Africa, throughout Europe, and across Asia in Siberia and Mongolia to the Kamchatka Peninsula. They live in deep pine-rich forests.

The species has reached other continents, such as Australia, South Africa and North America, through the export of timber and firewood. While invasion was prevented in North America for a long time, the European woodwasp established itself in New Zealand around 1900. There, it contributed to massive pine declines in the first half of the 20th century, spreading to Tasmania in the 1950s and then to the Australian mainland. Since 1980, it has reached pine plantations in Uruguay, and later also Argentina, Brazil and Chile; it was found in South Africa in 1994. The population increased in the Great Lakes area from 2004 on; the species had reached Vermont, New York, Pennsylvania, Ohio, and Michigan by 2009. The woodwasps can swarm between 20–50 km (12–31 mi); it has been estimated it will take until about 2050 to spread to the far southeast of the USA at the current rate of spread.

Subsequently, forestry authorities intensified their pest control methods and additionally started education campaigns, such as warning not to transport firewood over large distances or to store it too long. Through wood export, the wasp was able to spread to East Asia, West Australia and parts of Africa. Remote locations, such as the Horn of Africa, may be spared from the European woodwasp, providing the area is controlled. The Invasive Species Specialist Group (ISSG) of the IUCN has graded the wasp as heavily invasive.

== Ecology ==
=== Phenology ===
The flight time of the adults or imagines begins in the late summer to early autumn, but the date depends on the region and climate. The males hatch out earlier than females and create swarms which gather around the treetops. The females seek out leks and couple with the males on the uppermost shoots. Then the females search for suitable host trees, if possible choosing weak and dry wood. They orient on monoterpene hydrocarbon compounds, which weakened trees produce. When a tree is stressed through dryness or exterior injuries, the compounds pervade osmotic barriers and escape from the bark.

The female alights on the bark to drill several holes through the wood to the xylem, placing one egg in each. At the same time, she inserts spores of Amylostereum areolatum and a phytotoxic secretion. The holes branch out into several tubes, which lead away radially. The eggs are white, sausage-shaped, and 1.0–1.5 mm (5/128–1/16 in) by 0.2–0.3 mm (1/128–1/64 in) in size. Small females may lay 20 eggs, while the largest can lay up to 500. Sometimes, eggs are not placed in every tube. In the last tube, the female injects only the secretion and the fungal spores. The females often die after just three or four days, sometimes even during oviposition (egg-laying), through overexertion.

=== Development of larvae ===
Larvae of European woodwasp develop through arrhenotoky, in which male larvae develop only from unfertilised eggs, the females only from fertilised ones. Usually, 10 males are produced per female, but the ratio varies between 20:1 and 1:1. The larvae hatch after eight days at the earliest, but in some exterior conditions, they may remain in the egg for several months. At the optimal temperature of around 25 °C (77 °F), they hatch out after 10 to 12 days. Although the larvae hatch at 30 °C (86 °F) two to three days earlier, they are 20% more likely to die. Such extreme temperatures result in slower development, and below 6.2 °C (43.2 °F), the larvae die. A sufficient interspersion of the wood with the mycelium of the woodwasp is crucial for its hatching, as the fungus prevents the wood from drying out. Without these prerequisites, hatching is not possible. The tree can only ward off the infestation if it floods the boreholes with resin or halts the fungus by producing a wall of polyphenols.

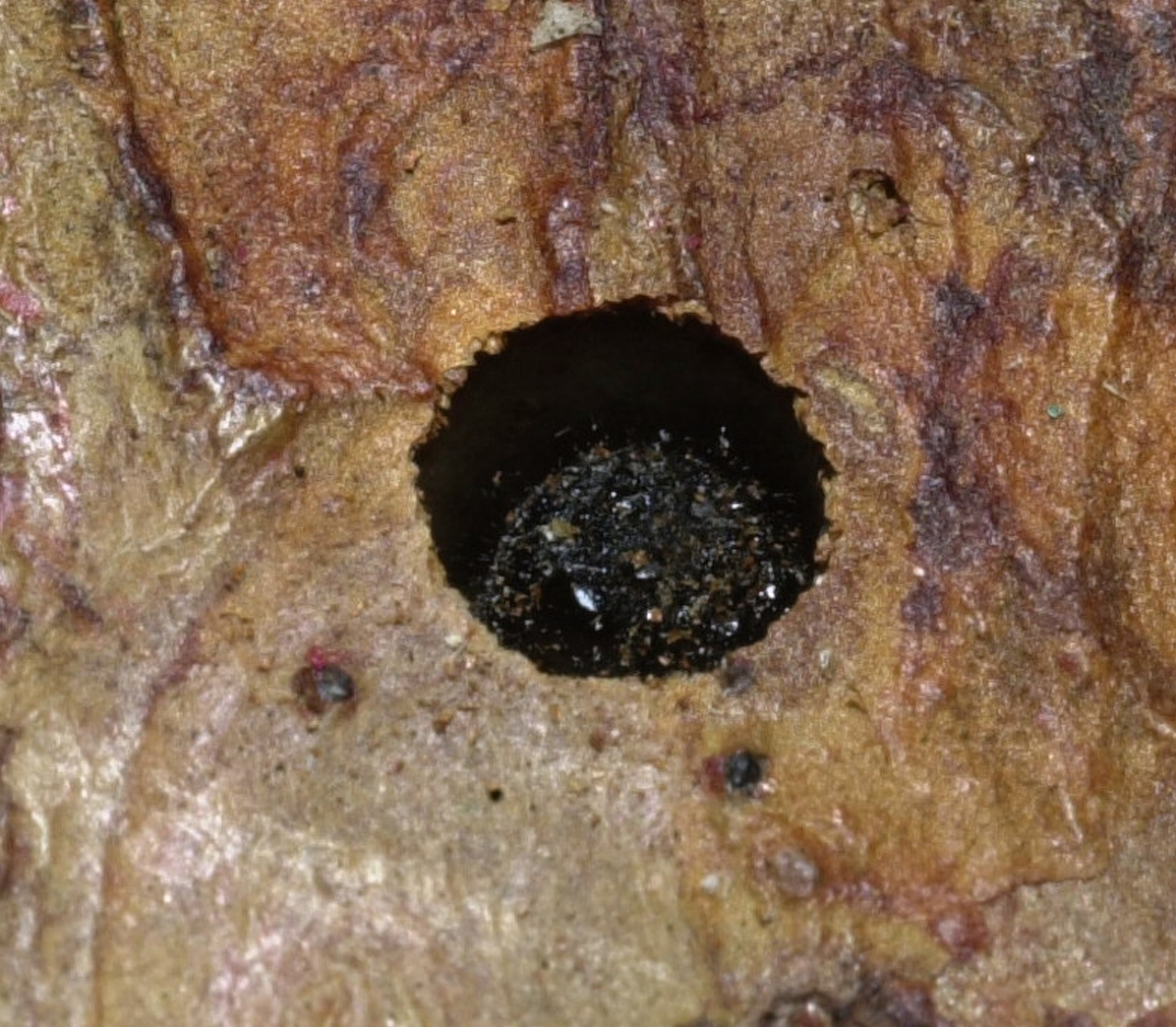
Sirex noctilio in the hatch hole

Six to twelve larval stages occur. During the first two stages, the larvae live off surrounding fungal tissue, until they reach the inner wood. Up to the fourth stage, they eat through the final summer wood along the tracheids, and finally towards the heartwood. After the seventh stage, they usually reach their maximum size. While penetrating further, they normally turn either up or down, but they turn back if they meet a foreign borehole, encounter bubbles of resin, or dry out. The larvae only live off the fungal mycelium, which they digest through a secretion. They pupate several centimetres under the bark. Before this, female larvae sequester a secretion containing fungal oidia, which adult females incorporate in their mycetangia above their ovipositors. The adults eat through the bark, but, depending on the weather, they remain in the hatch hole for up to three weeks before they leave the wood in warm and sunny weather.

The period from hatching to pupation lasts 10 days to two years, exceptionally up to six years. Climate is a major factor, because development is slower in colder regions.

=== Symbiosis ===
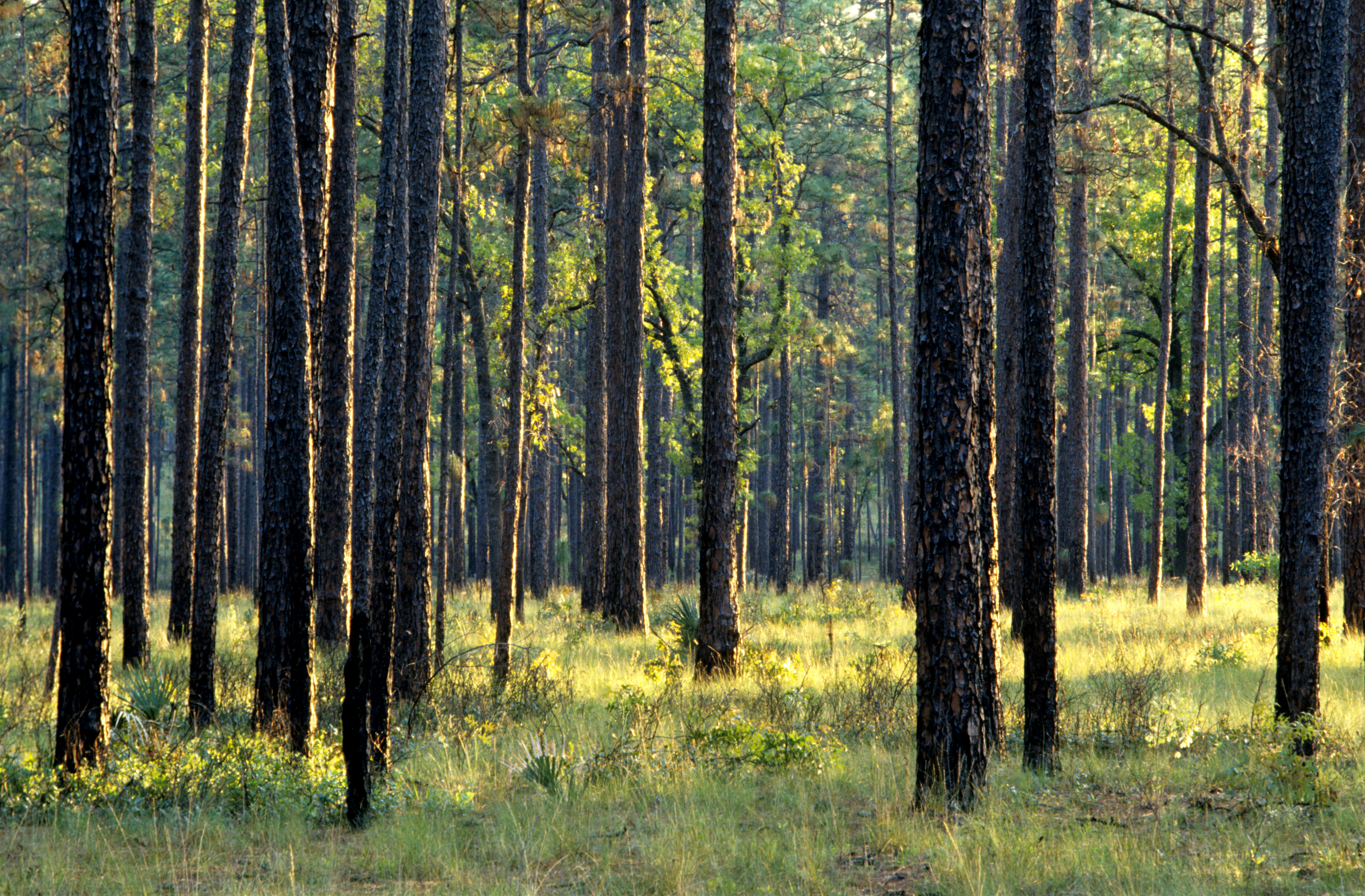
The wasp's host spectrum in North America includes the endangered Pinus palustris

The European woodwasp and Amylostereum areolatum have a mutualistic symbiotic relationship. The European woodwasp is, together with S. juvencus and S. nitobei from eastern Asia, one of three symbionts of the fungus that in the first instance benefits from its vector function. Additionally, the wasp creates the optimal conditions for the infestation through the fungus by drilling into the underlying wood layers and weakening the host tree. The fungus has adapted to this process in the course of evolution and only rarely creates fruit bodies.

Conversely, the woodwasp is fully dependent on the symbionts. Decomposition enables the larvae to unlock the wood by producing white rot. The mycetangia of this and other wasps from the family Siricidae support a close relationship with saprobiontic fungi. Without the process of decomposition of the host tree and weakening of the infested tree, the development of larvae is arrested. If the tree can recover from the consequences of the wasp secretion, it blocks the boreholes with resin, thus killing the larvae.

=== Host spectrum ===
The European woodwasp only attacks conifers, especially pines. In its usual habitat, these are mainly Pinus sylvestris, P. pinaster and P. nigra. In the Southern Hemisphere and in North America, the wasp attacks exotic and domestic pine species, generally in plantations. Examples include P. radiata and P. taeda in the United States.

Unlike any other species of Siricidae, the European woodwasp can damage relatively healthy trees so heavily, they die back. However, the wasp mainly infests weakened trees; only when the population is high does the insect also attack intact and healthy trees. Because the wasp larvae and the fungus need living wood, the European woodwasp does not infest dry or dead timber. However, wasps may hatch from processed wood which was already infested.

Pines in North America that have been attacked or confirmed as hosts are: Scots (Pinus sylvestris), Monterey (P. radiata), loblolly (P. taeda), slash (P. elliottii), shortleaf (P. echinata), ponderosa (P. ponderosa), lodgepole (P. contorta), and jack (P. banksiana) (Haugen 1999). By the spring of 2011, S. noctilio had been found in Michigan, Pennsylvania, New York, and Vermont.

Though pines are preferred, it has also been recorded attacking other genera in the Pinaceae, including Picea (spruces), Abies (firs), Pseudotsuga (douglas-firs), and Larix (larches).

=== Symptoms of infestation ===
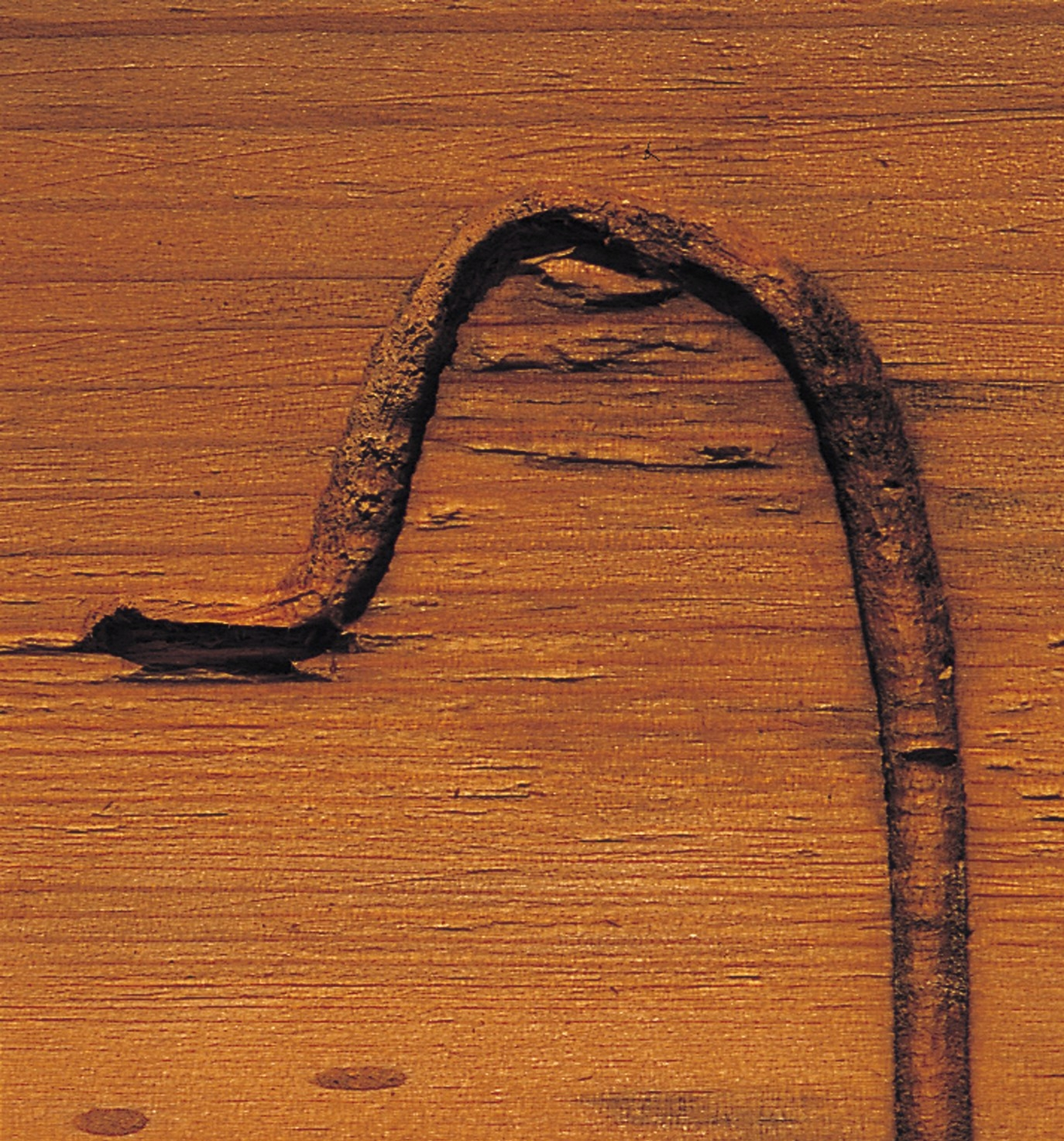
Borehole of a larva

Infestation damage can be divided into four categories or phases, depending on whether it is caused by the imago, fungus, larvae or secondary parasites.

The first reaction of the host tree is due to the adult wasp and occurs after 10 to 14 days. A phytotoxic secretion of the wasp impairs metabolism in the shoots and needles, causing loss of water balance. The result is browning of the needles and leaf drop. As with many other wood pests, fine resin drops in wasp boreholes are found in the central trunk. Attacked pines tend to develop flagging. Tip dieback begins with the needles becoming chlorotic and changing from green to yellowish-red, finally turning completely brown over a three- to six-month period. The wasp bores 1/8 to 3/8 inch (3.2 to 9.5 mm)-diameter holes in the tree. Unstressed trees may be attacked uniformly along the main stem, while trees with low osmotic phloem pressure are preferentially attacked, with denser clusters of boreholes.

During this process, fungal spores germinate in the boreholes, a reaction caused by the dryness of the tree, creating an appropriate environment and an entry for air. The fungus breaks down the lignin, causing white rot. It moves towards the vertically aligned xylem. The vertical profile shows reddish and white streaks which run in the direction of growth.

In the third stage, the larva begins to bore into the wood. By doing this, it eats a path, which at first proceeds towards the trunk centre, before turning and running back to the bark. The paths are not visible in cross-section, because they are heavily blocked with sawdust; they may also be unobserved during wood processing. The lengths of the paths vary, depending on the wood, between 5 and 20 cm (2 and 8 in) diameter, which depends on the size of the larvae. The exit holes are circular and of very small diameter.

Stressing of the host tree and visible larval boreholes appear in the fourth stage. The infestation is reinforced by further insects or fungi, which in turn may cause more symptoms. Imago, fungus, and larvae together can cause tree death in a period ranging from two weeks to eight months.

=== Natural predators and parasites ===
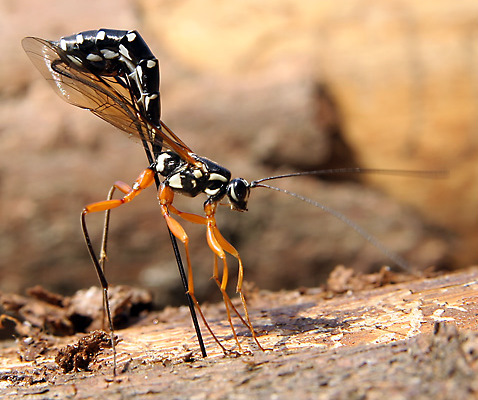
Rhyssa persuasoria specialises on Sirex noctilio and its relatives. They lay their eggs on the wasp larvae.

Birds are the primary natural predators of the European woodwasp. The black woodpecker (Dryocopius martius) and great spotted woodpecker (Dendrocopus major) consume some larvae, but do not specialise on the European woodwasp. In Australia, the flying adults are hunted by woodswallows (Artamidae) and swifts (Apodidae), both of which prefer males.

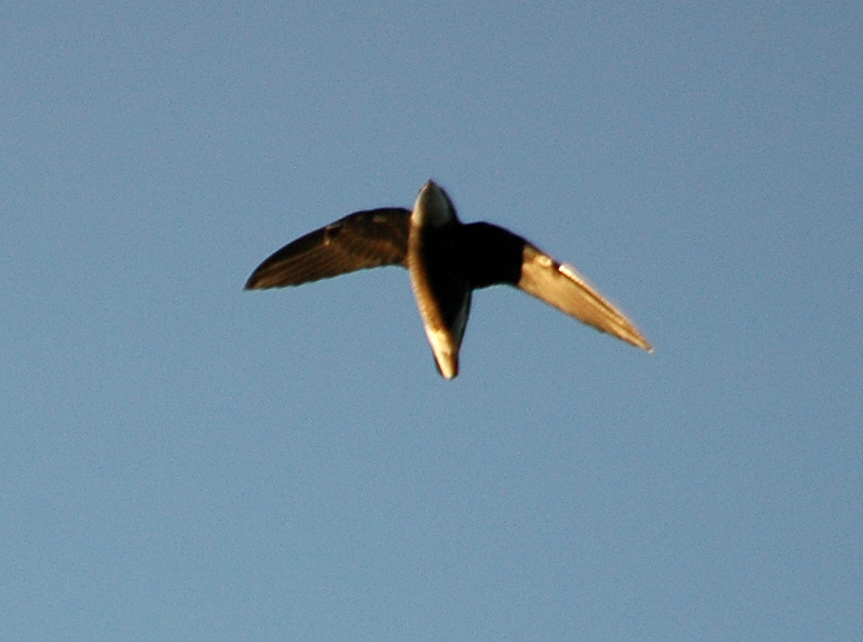
The white-throated needletail (Hirundapus caudacutus), an Asian and Australian bird species, will take the wasps in flight.

Several parasites have a larger impact on woodwasp populations. These include Ibalia leucospoides (Ibaliidae); Schletterius cinctipes, Megarhyssa nortoni (Ichneumonidae); and Rhyssa persuasoria. While I. leucospoides lay its eggs into the woodwasp's egg and the hatching period is therefore similar to its host's, the ichneumons mentioned lay their eggs on larvae or adult woodwasps; they hatch out later in the springtime. The parasites locate host larvae hidden in the wood using their antennae to detect cues, including the smell of leaking drill dust or fungus mycelium, weak vibrations, or differences in temperature. The majority of these insect hyperparasites feed on honeydew and nectar, both of which affect the woodwasps' sensitivity.

Another parasite is the nematode Beddingia (Deladenus) siricidicola, which was suggested in the New World in the 1970s as a possible biological control. B. siricidicola causes infertility in female wasps, but does not impair the fertility of males. Inside the host tree, the nematodes primarily feed on fungal mycelium. If they get near the wasp larvae, they infect females, which then couple with males and finally infest the wasp larvae. These eventually exit the tree carrying the nematodes with them. Competition for food between B. siricidicola and the wasp larvae also occurs, resulting in slower growth and possible starvation of the woodwasp larvae. The population of the European woodwasp is very prone to infestation by B. siricidicola; infestation rates of up to 90% have been recorded. The nematodes are often used to combat the wasps by combining them with the symbiosis partner Amylostereum. The related species B. wilsoni has a similar effect, but as it also lives parasitically with the genus Rhyssa, it is not used for pest control.

== Management options ==
Several biological control agents have been employed to try to limit populations of the European woodwasp. B. siricidicola has been shown to infect up to 70% of the wasps, but delivery and inoculation have been a problem when delivering the organism to the tree. The introduction of hyperparasitic wasps Megarhyssa nortoni nortoni, Rhyssa persuasoria persuasoria and Ibalia leucospoides leucospoides have been successful but, although a lessening in the numbers of the wasp has been observed, those measures are not stopping its spread, because the predators do not reduce wasp populations below 40% of the local population.

As a consequence of forest damage in Australia and New Zealand, wood imports to those countries have been required to be certified free from living sirex larvae.

Treatment has also been attempted with bromomethane (CH_{3}Br), through heat, or by removing the bark.
