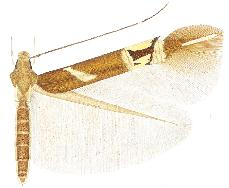

Scientific classification
- Kingdom: Animalia
- Phylum: Arthropoda
- Class: Insecta
- Order: Lepidoptera
- Family: Cosmopterigidae
- Genus: Cosmopterix
- Species: C. nitens

Binomial name
- Cosmopterix nitens Walsingham, 1889

= Cosmopterix nitens =

Species of moth

Cosmopterix nitens is a moth of the family Cosmopterigidae. It is known from the United States, where it is found from coastal South Carolina to south-western Texas. It is also established in Michigan.

== Description ==
=== Adult ===
Male, female. Forewing length 3.8-4.5 mm. Head: frons shining ochreous-white, vertex, neck tufts and collar shining pale bronze brown with greenish gloss; labial palpus, first segment very short, white, second segment three-quarters of the length of third, grey with white longitudinal lines laterally and ventrally, third segment white, lined dark greyish brown laterally; scape dark bronze brown with a white anterior line, ventrally white, antenna dark bronze brown, beyond two-thirds a white ring of two segments, followed towards apex by fourteen dark bronze brown and five white, mixed greyish brown, segments at apex. Thorax and tegulae shining pale bronze brown with greenish gloss. Legs: dark grey, foreleg with a white line on tibia and tarsal segments one, two and five, segment three white in basal half, tibia of midleg with an oblique white dorsal line in basal half and a white apical ring, tarsal segments one and two with white apical rings, tibia of hindleg with oblique white basal and medial lines and a white apical ring, tarsal segments one, two and four with white apical rings, segment five dorsally white, spurs white dorsally, dark grey ventrally. Forewing shining bronze brown with a strong golden gloss, darker bronze brown in female, an inwardly oblique broad silver to pale golden metallic fascia at one-quarter, widening towards dorsum, but not reaching it, a pale yellow transverse fascia beyond the middle, narrowing towards dorsum, bordered at the inner edge by a tubercular silver to pale golden metallic fascia, perpendicular at dorsum and not reaching costa, bordered at the outer edge by a broad, slightly outward oblique similarly coloured fascia, widest on dorsum, both fasciae with some pale reddish reflection, in the middle of the transverse fascia a broad blackish-brown streak with strong reddish gloss, the inner fascia with some irregular blackish brown lining on the outside, the outer fascia lined blackish brown on the inside, outer fascia costally edged by a white costal streak, apical line as a broad silver to pale golden metallic streak from the middle of the apical area and ending just before apex, cilia bronze brown around apex, paler towards base, hindwing pale brownish grey, cilia greyish brown. Underside: forewing shining greyish brown, the apical line indistinctly visible, hindwing greyish brown. Abdomen shining brown, segments banded paler posteriorly, laterally shining grey with greenish reflection, ventrally yellowish white, anal tuft dorsally brown, ventrally yellowish white.

=== Larva ===
Head black, body yellowish orange to brownish with a red dorsal and single lateral broken lines.

== Biology ==
The larvae feed on Phragmites australis. They mine the leaves of their host plant. The mine has the form of a gallery ranging in length from 3 to 7 cm. The frass is piled at basal end of the mine and expelled from an opening at that end. The larva moves along the mine when disturbed. It hibernates in its cocoon inside the mine. Adults fly from March and April until October. It is multivoltine at least in the south, but probably univoltine in Michigan.
