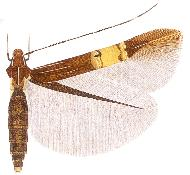

Scientific classification
- Kingdom: Animalia
- Phylum: Arthropoda
- Clade: Pancrustacea
- Class: Insecta
- Order: Lepidoptera
- Family: Cosmopterigidae
- Genus: Cosmopterix
- Species: C. etmylaurae

Binomial name
- Cosmopterix etmylaurae Koster, 2010

= Cosmopterix etmylaurae =

Species of moth

Cosmopterix etmylaurae is a moth of the family Cosmopterigidae. It is known from Costa Rica.

== Description ==
=== Adult ===
Male, female. Forewing length 2.9-3.5 mm. Head: frons shining pale golden, vertex and neck tufts shining bronze brown with reddish gloss, lined white laterally, collar shining bronze brown; labial palpus first segment very short, white, second segment four-fifths of the length of third, dark brown with white longitudinal lines laterally and ventrally, third segment white, lined brown laterally, apex white; scape dorsally dark brown with a white anterior line, ventrally yellowish white, antenna shining dark brown with a very short white line at base changing into an interrupted line to three-quarters, followed towards apex by five white or partly white segments, approximately sixteen dark brown and one white segment at apex. Thorax and tegulae shining bronze brown with reddish gloss, thorax with a white median line. Legs: shining dark brown with reddish gloss, femora shining ochreous, foreleg with a white line on tibia and tarsal segments one to three and five, tibia of midleg with narrow white oblique basal and medial streaks and a white apical ring, tarsal segments one and two with white dorsal spots at apex, segment five dorsally white, tibia of hindleg with a basal silver spot, and broad silvery white medial and apical rings, tarsal segment four dorsally and segment five entirely white, spurs shining white dorsally, dark brown ventrally. Forewing shining bronze brown with reddish gloss, three narrow white lines in the basal area, a subcostal from base to one-quarter, a medial just above fold, starting beyond base and ending just beyond the subcostal, a short subdorsal from one-quarter to beyond the medial, some traces of white scales on dorsum at one-sixth, a dirty yellow transverse fascia beyond the middle, bordered on each side by broad pale golden metallic fasciae with pinkish gloss and with a narrow blackish patch subcostally on the outside of the inner fascia, the outer fascia narrowed in the middle or interrupted, both fasciae lined brown at the sides of the transverse fascia, a narrow white apical line from beyond the outer fascia, the narrow white apical line changing in the cilia into a broader yellow line to the tip of the wing, cilia bronze brown around apex, paler towards dorsum. Hindwing shining dark brownish grey with greenish and reddish reflections, cilia brown. Underside: forewing shining greyish brown, the yellow streak in the costal cilia at apex distinctly visible, hindwing shining greyish brown. Abdomen dorsally shining dark brownish grey with greenish and reddish reflections, ventrally shining dark brownish grey with greenish and reddish reflections and with a yellowish white medial streak, segments two to five banded shining yellowish white posteriorly, anal tuft ochreous-grey. In the female abdomen segment seven is entirely dark brown, ventrally banded pale yellow banded posteriorly.

=== Larva ===
Head pale brown, mouth parts dark brown, body transparent yellowish green with broad red dorsal and lateral lines.

== Biology ==
The larvae feed on Ipomoea neei. They mine the leaves of their host plant. The mine starts as an irregular gallery, later widening and branching. The larva constructs a silken gallery at the beginning of the mine from where most of the frass is rejected. Later some frass is heaped in the branches of the mine. The larva change mines and the second mines are irregular blotch mines, occupying a considerable part of the leaf. Pupation takes place inside the mine. Although Ipomoea santillanii also occurred next to the food plant the mines were not found on this plant. Adults have been collected in May.

== Etymology ==
The species is dedicated to the wife of the species author, Etmy Laura Koster-Keuter.
