= Oidium =

Oidium may refer to:

- Oidium (genus), a former genus of fungi in the family Erysiphaceae
- Oidium (spore), a type of fungal spore
- Oidium, a disease of grapes caused by the fungus species Erysiphe necator (syn. Oidium tuckeri)
