= Urocerus japonicus =

Scientific classification
- Domain: Eukaryota
- Kingdom: Animalia
- Phylum: Arthropoda
- Class: Insecta
- Order: Hymenoptera
- Family: Siricidae
- Genus: Urocerus
- Species: U. japonicus

Binomial name
- Urocerus japonicus (Smith, 1874)

Synonyms
- Sirex japonicus Smith, 1874

Species of sawfly

Urocerus japonicus, commonly known as the Japanese horntail, is a species of sawfly, native to southeastern Asia. Studies show that the dispersal distance of the female is higher than the male. The fungal species Amylostereum laevigatum had its first appearance in Japan via this sawfly.

== Ecology ==
This horntail lays its eggs in the trunk or branches of the Japanese cedar (Cryptomeria japonica) or the Japanese cypress (Chamaecyparis obtusa) and the larvae feed on the sapwood. When ovipositing, the horntail introduces a symbiont fungus which either provides essential nutrients for the larvae, or which produces enzymes which help decompose the lignin or cellulose in the wood. The staining produced by the fungus reduces the commercial value of the timber.

The horntail carries arthrospores of the fungus in a pair of small sacs on the abdomen known as "mycangia". A newly emerged adult female makes a short dispersal flight before drilling several holes in the bark of a suitable tree, depositing eggs and arthrospores from the mycangia in each hole.
