= Amylostereum ferreum =

Scientific classification
- Domain: Eukaryota
- Kingdom: Fungi
- Division: Basidiomycota
- Class: Agaricomycetes
- Order: Russulales
- Family: Amylostereaceae
- Genus: Amylostereum
- Species: A. ferreum

Binomial name
- Amylostereum ferreum (Berk. & M.A.Curtis) Boidin & Lanq. (1984)

Synonyms
- Stereum ferreum Berk. & M.A.Curtis (1869); Coniophora ferrea (Berk. & M.A.Curtis) Speg. (1898); Lloydella ferrea (Berk. & M.A.Curtis) Bres. (1901)

Species of fungus

Amylostereum ferreum is a species of crust fungus in the family Amylostereaceae.
