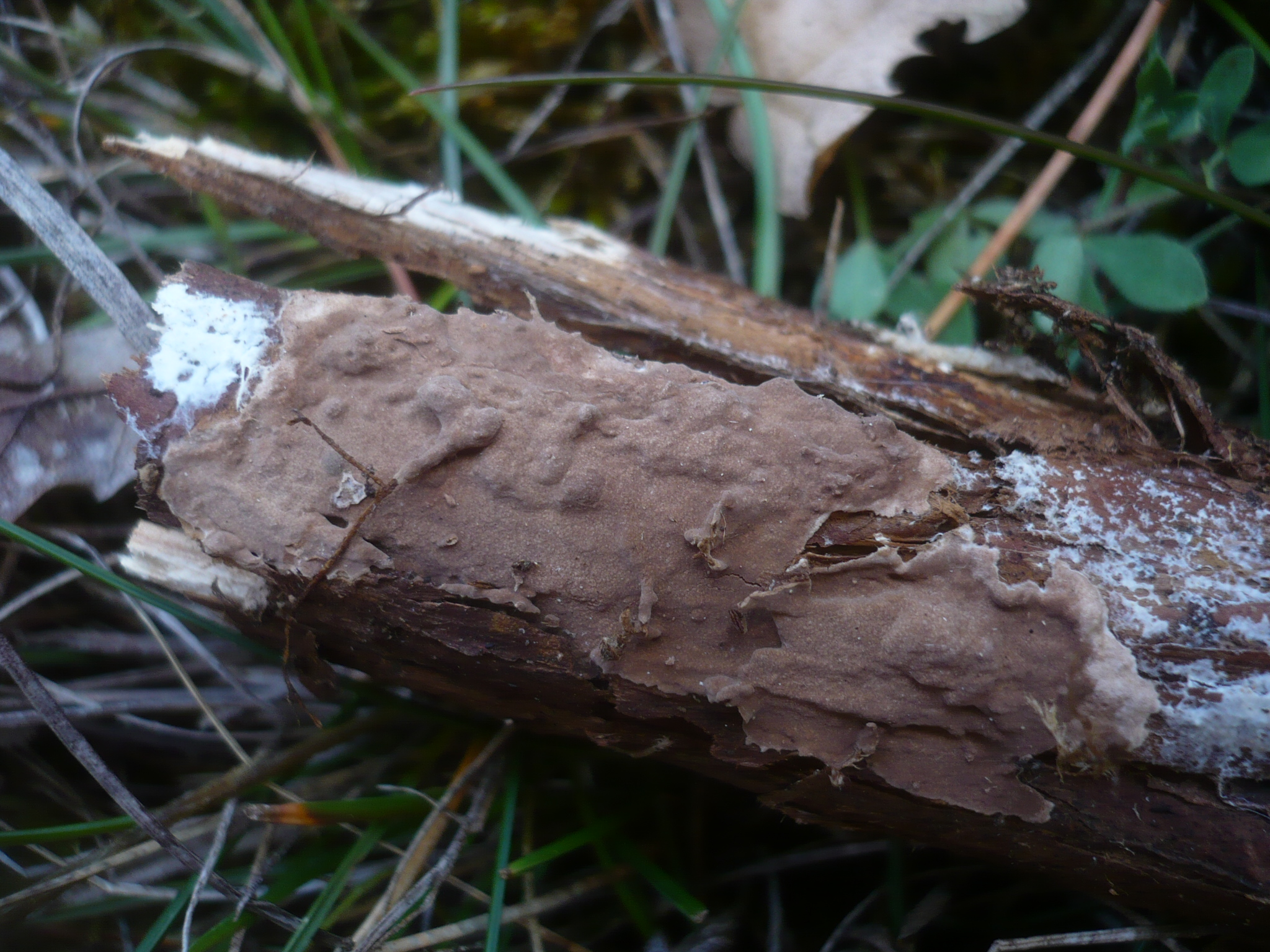

Scientific classification
- Domain: Eukaryota
- Kingdom: Fungi
- Division: Basidiomycota
- Class: Agaricomycetes
- Order: Russulales
- Family: Amylostereaceae
- Genus: Amylostereum
- Species: A. laevigatum

Binomial name
- Amylostereum laevigatum (Fr.) Boidin (1958)

Synonyms
- Thelephora laevigata Fr. (1828); Corticium laevigatum (Fr.) Fr. (1838); Peniophora laevigata (Fr.) P.Karst. (1881); Xerocarpus laevigatus (Fr.) P.Karst. (1881); Hymenochaete laevigata (Fr.) Massee (1890); Terana laevigata (Fr.) Kuntze (1891); Kneiffia laevigata (Fr.) Bres. (1903); Gloeocystidiellum laevigatum (Fr.) Y.Hayashi (1974)

= Amylostereum laevigatum =

Species of fungus

Amylostereum laevigatum (yew duster) is a species of crust fungus in the family Amylostereaceae. Originally named Thelephora laevigata by Elias Fries in 1828, it was given its current name when transferred to the genus Amylostereum by French mycologist Jacques Boidin in 1958.

== Ecology ==
Amylostereum laevigatum is known from Norway, Sweden, France, Switzerland, Canada and the United States, where it occurs on Abies, Juniperus, Taxus and Thuja. The fungus first appeared in Japan as a symbiont of the Japanese horntail (Urocerus japonicus), being injected into the sapwood of the Japanese cedar (Cryptomeria japonica) and the Japanese cypress (Chamaecyparis obtusa) trees when the female horntail oviposited beneath the bark.
