= Frass =

Waste from insects

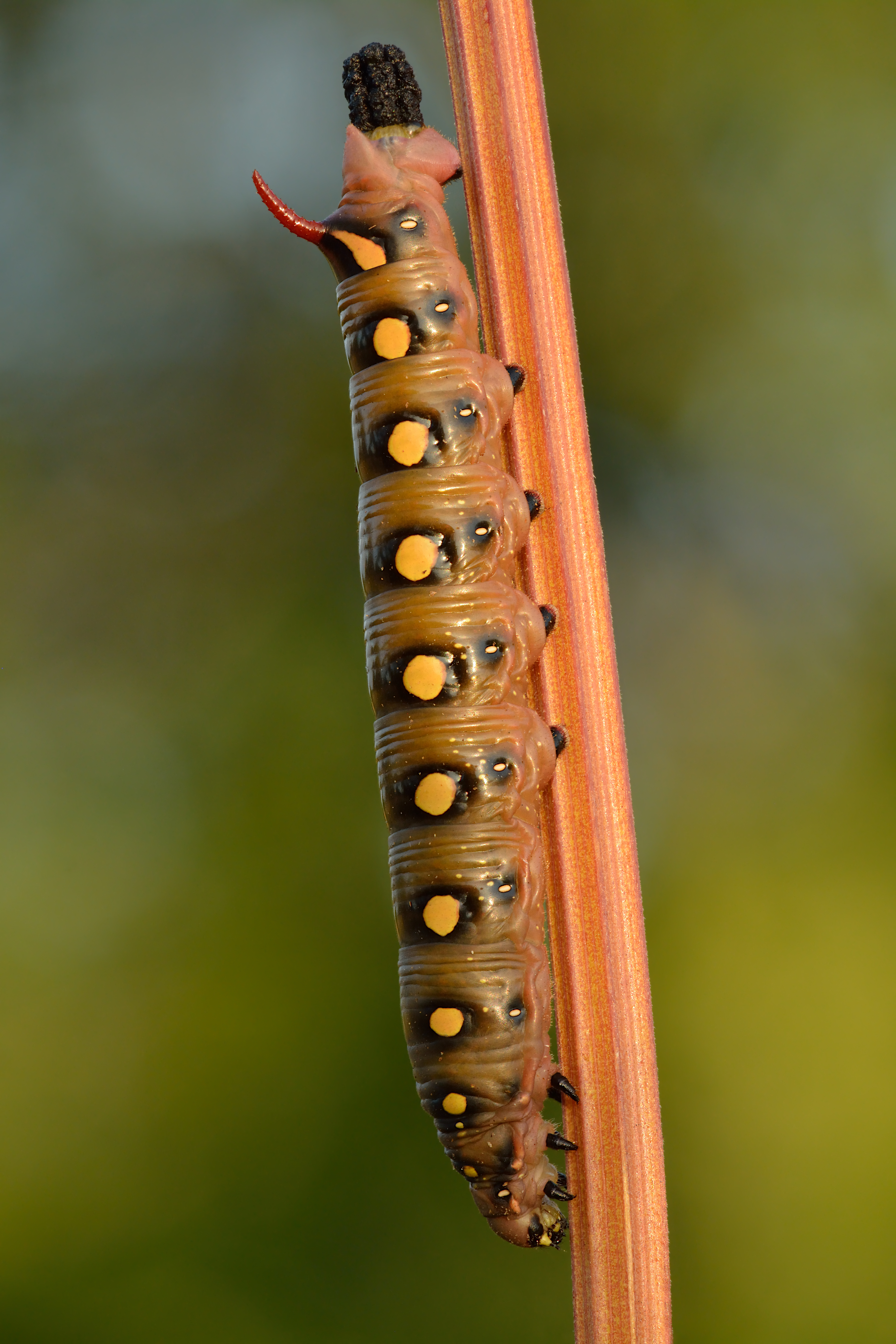
Bedstraw hawk-moth caterpillar leaving the frass behind

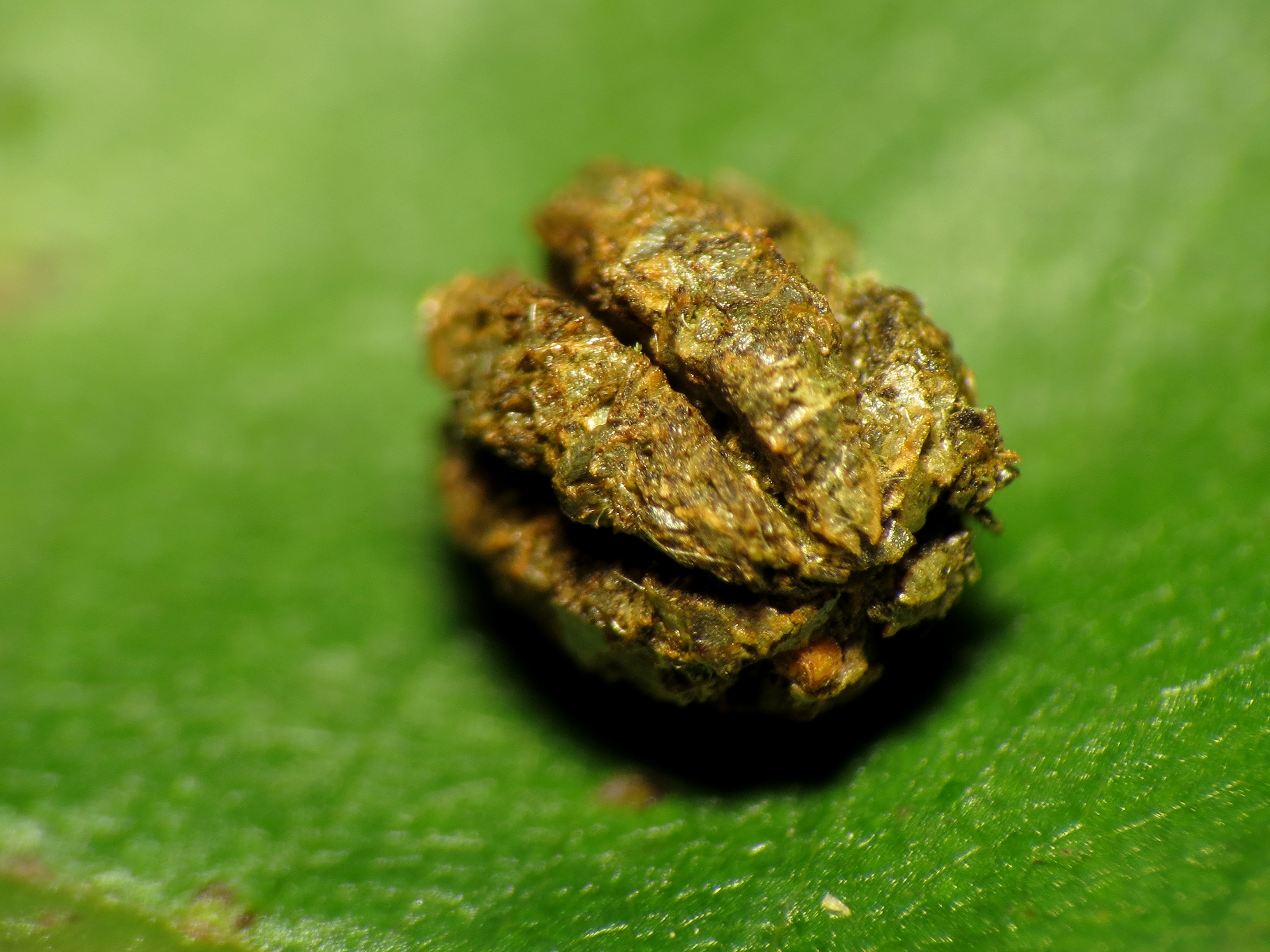
Typical sculpting of a frass pellet of a large caterpillar

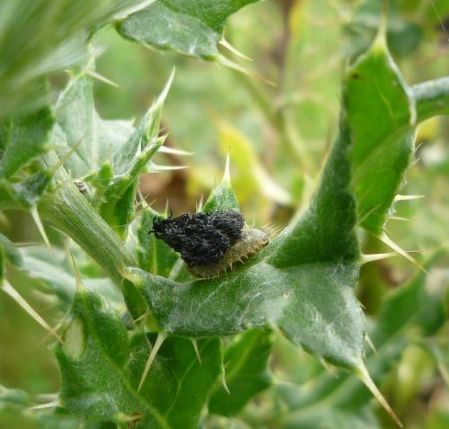
A thistle tortoise beetle larva carrying a mass of its own frass as a repugnatorial defence.

This Lepidoptera larva disposes of its frass that might attract predators or parasites.

Frass refers loosely to the more or less solid excreta of insects, and to certain other related matter.

== Definition and etymology ==
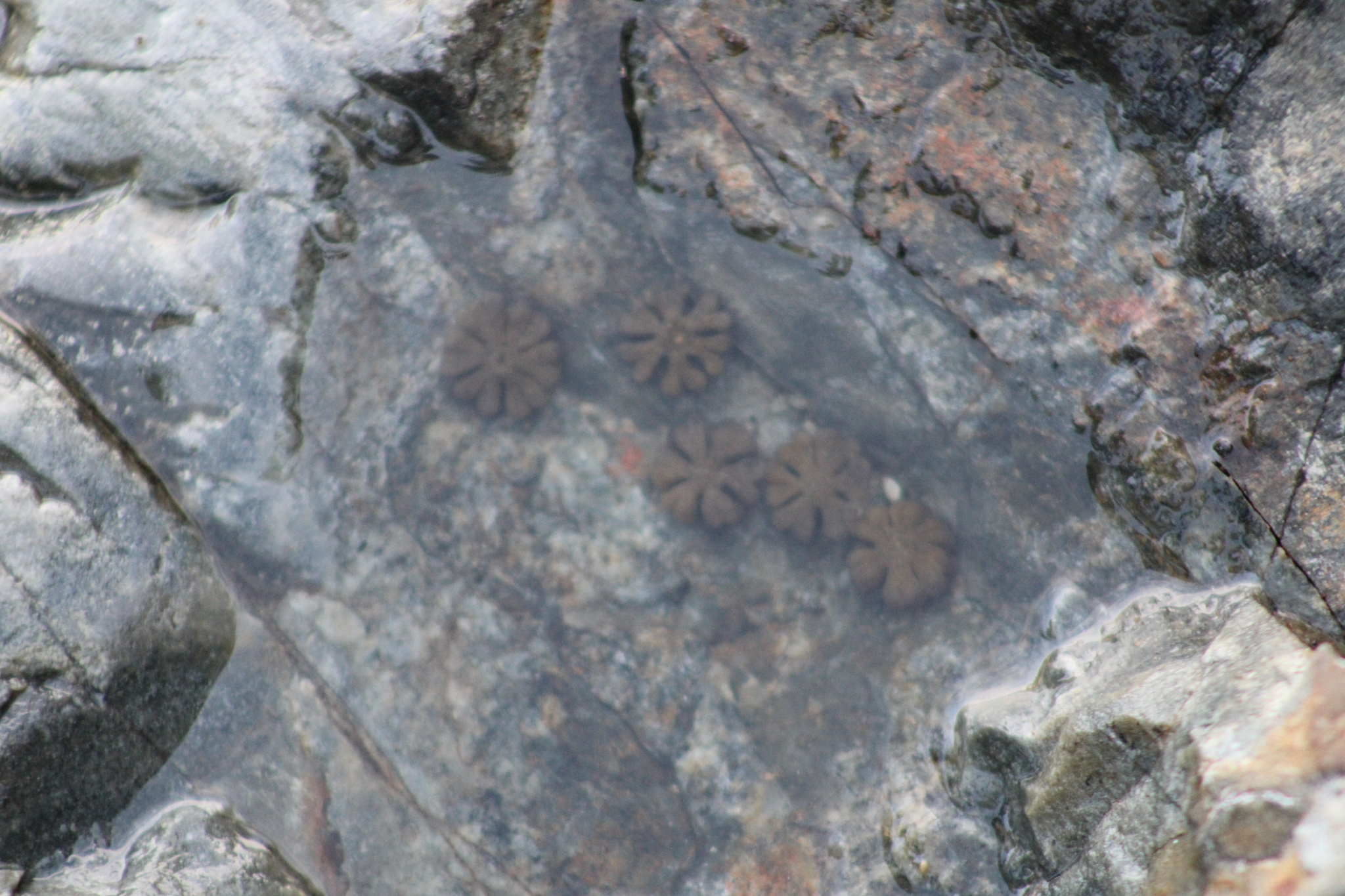
Lepidopteran larva frass after soaking in water

Frass is an informal term and accordingly it is variously used and variously defined. It is derived from the German word Fraß, which means the food takeup of an animal. The English usage applies to excreted residues of anything that insects had eaten, and similarly, to other chewed or mined refuse that insects leave behind. It does not generally refer to fluids such as honeydew, but the point does not generally arise, and is largely ignored in this article.

Such usage in English originated in the mid-nineteenth century at the latest. Modern technical English sources differ on the precise definition, though there is little direct contradiction on the practical realities. One glossary from the early twentieth century speaks of "...excrement; usually the excreted pellets of caterpillars." In some contexts frass refers primarily to fine, masticated material, often powdery, that phytophagous insects pass as indigestible waste after they have processed plant tissues as completely as their physiology would permit. Other common examples of frass types include the fecal material that larvae of codling moths leave as they feed inside fruit or seed, or that Terastia meticulosalis larvae leave as they bore in the pith of Erythrina twigs.

Various forms of frass may result from the nature of the food and the digestive systems of the species of insect that excreted the material. For example, many caterpillars, especially large, leaf-eating caterpillars in families such as Saturniidae, produce quite elaborately moulded pellets that may be conspicuous on the ground beneath plants in which they feed. In the tunnels they eat in the leaves, leaf miners commonly leave visible amorphous frass residues of the pulp of the mesophyll. Their frass commonly does not fill the tunnel.

In contrast, larvae of most powder post beetles (Lyctus) partly eject their finely granular frass from their tunnels when boring in the wood on which they feed, while the larvae of most dry-wood Cerambycidae leave their frass packed tightly into the tunnels behind them. Many other species of wood borers also leave the tunnels behind them tightly packed with dry frass, which may be either finely powdery or coarsely sawdusty. Possibly this is a defence against other borer larvae, many species of which are cannibalistic, or it might reduce attacks from some kinds of predatory mites or soak up fluids that a live tree might secrete into the tunnel.

Loose, fibrous frass of some moths in the family Cossidae, such as Coryphodema tristis, may be seen protruding from the mouths of their tunnels in tree trunks, especially shortly before they emerge as adult moths. In this respect, their frass differs from the powdery frass of powder post beetles such as Lyctus.

Borer tunnels may occur either in dry or rotting wood or under bark, in the comparatively soft, nutritious bast tissue, either dead or living.

Some boring insects do not digest the wood or other medium itself, but bore tunnels in which yeasts or other fungi grow, possibly stimulated by excretions and secretions of the insects. Such tunnels obviously cannot be permitted to become clogged, or the insects could not access their own pastures, so they must either eject at least part of their frass, or otherwise leave room for the edible growth. Examples of such boring-insect/fungal associations include ambrosia beetles with ambrosia fungi, the Sirex noctilio with its fungal partner Amylostereum areolatum, and more.

In a significantly different sense the term "frass" also may refer to excavated wood shavings that carpenter ants, carpenter bees and other insects with similar wood-boring habits eject from their galleries during the tunneling process. Such material differs from the frass residues of foods, because insects that tunnel to construct such nests do not eat the wood, so the material that they discard as they tunnel has not passed through their gut. Even professional entomologists might need suitable instruments and detailed examination to distinguish this from food-derived frass.

== Ecological considerations ==
Contact with frass causes plants to secrete chitinase in response to its high chitin levels. Some frass, such as that of the fall armyworm, can also reduce plants' herbivory defenses. Frass is a microbial inoculant, in particular a soil inoculant, a source of desirable microbes, that promotes the formation of compost.

Many insect species, usually in their larval stages, accumulate their frass and cover themselves with it either to disguise their presence, or as a repugnatorial covering.

== Gallery ==
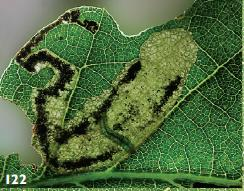
Frass in the oak leaf mine of a final instar larva of the moth Ectoedemia heckfordi

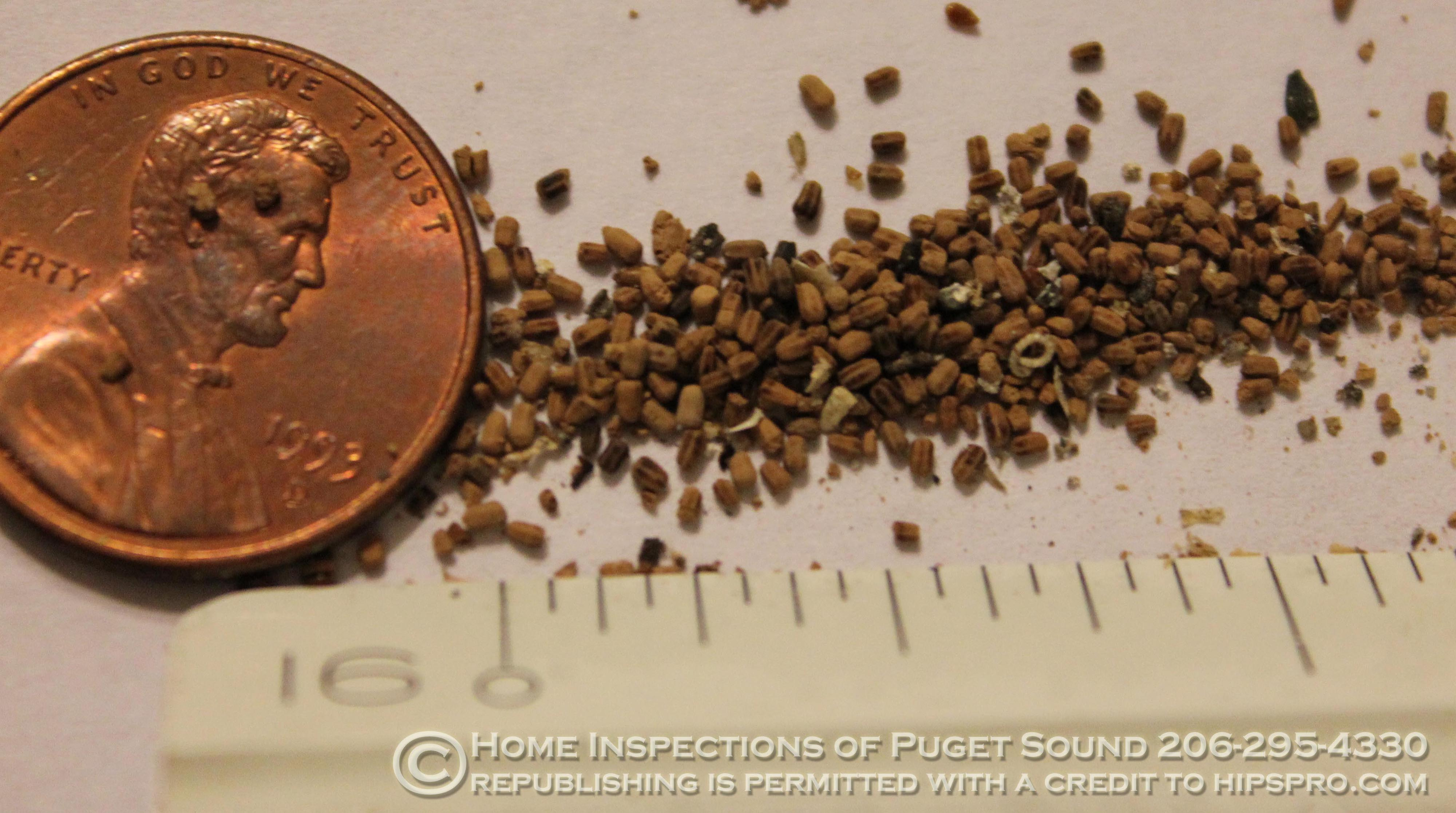
The frass of dampwood termites may be a useful sign of an infestation

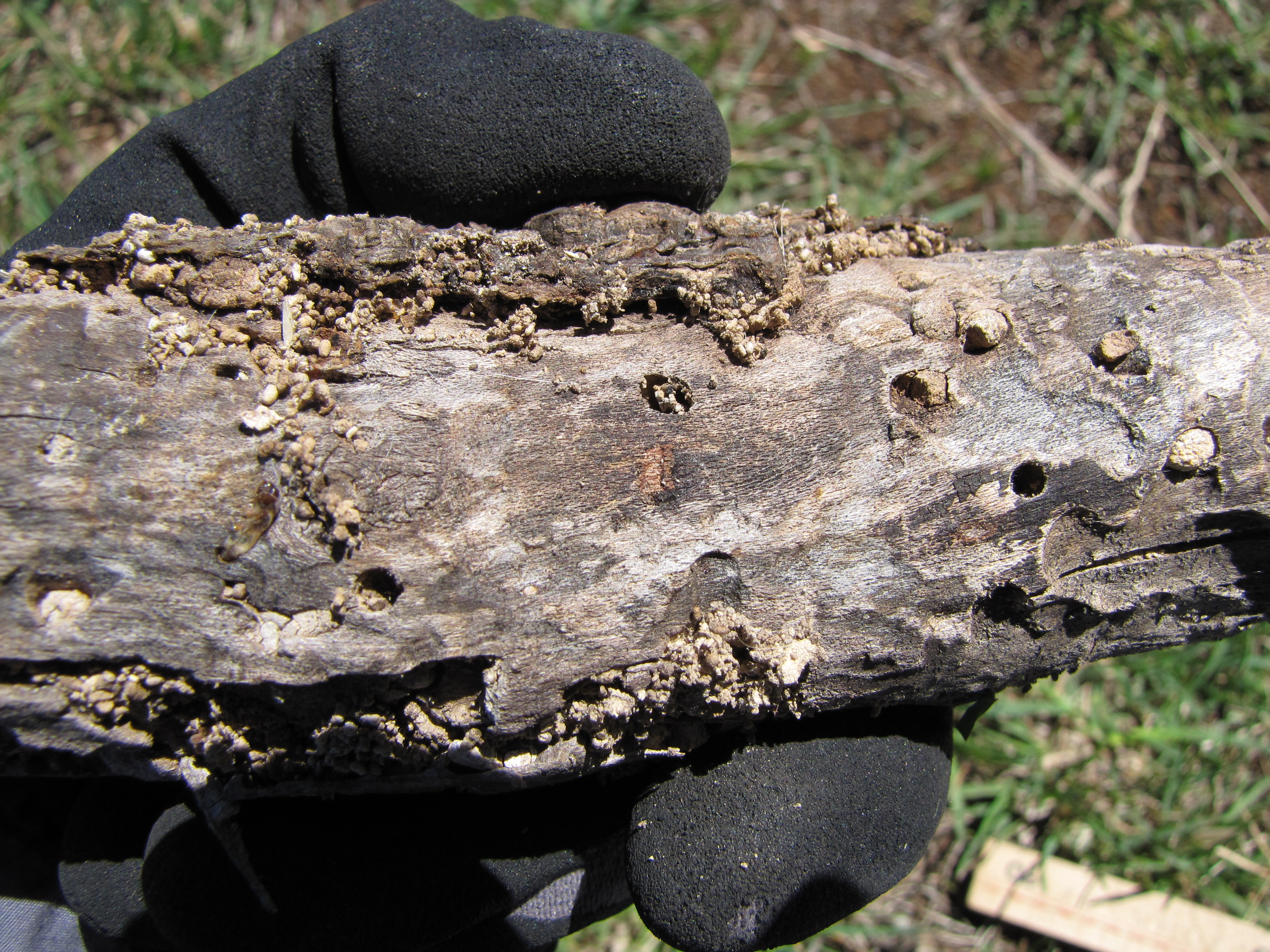
Galleries of various species of wood-boring beetles typically are stuffed with frass

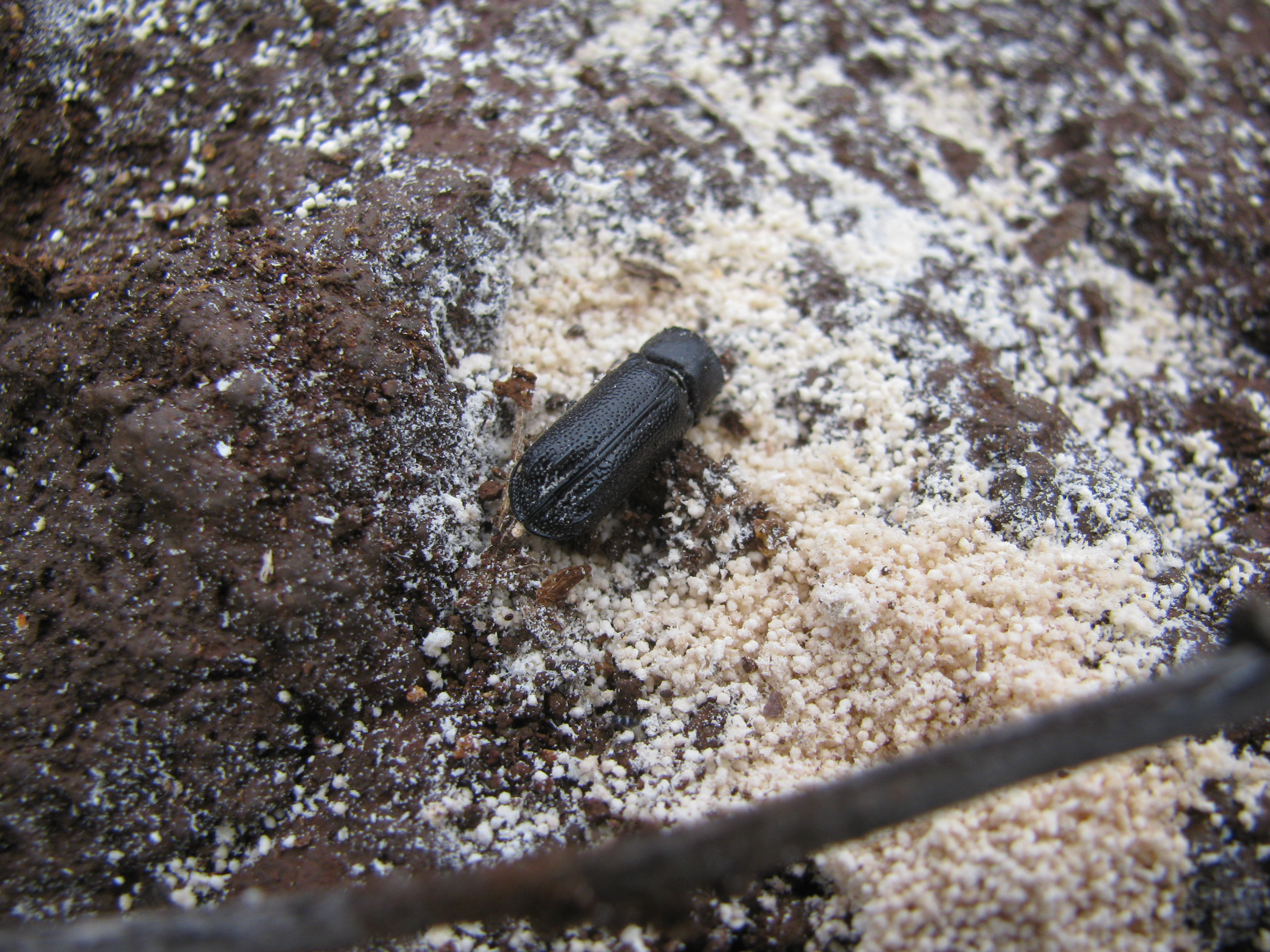
Typical frass dust from bostrichid shot hole borer beetles

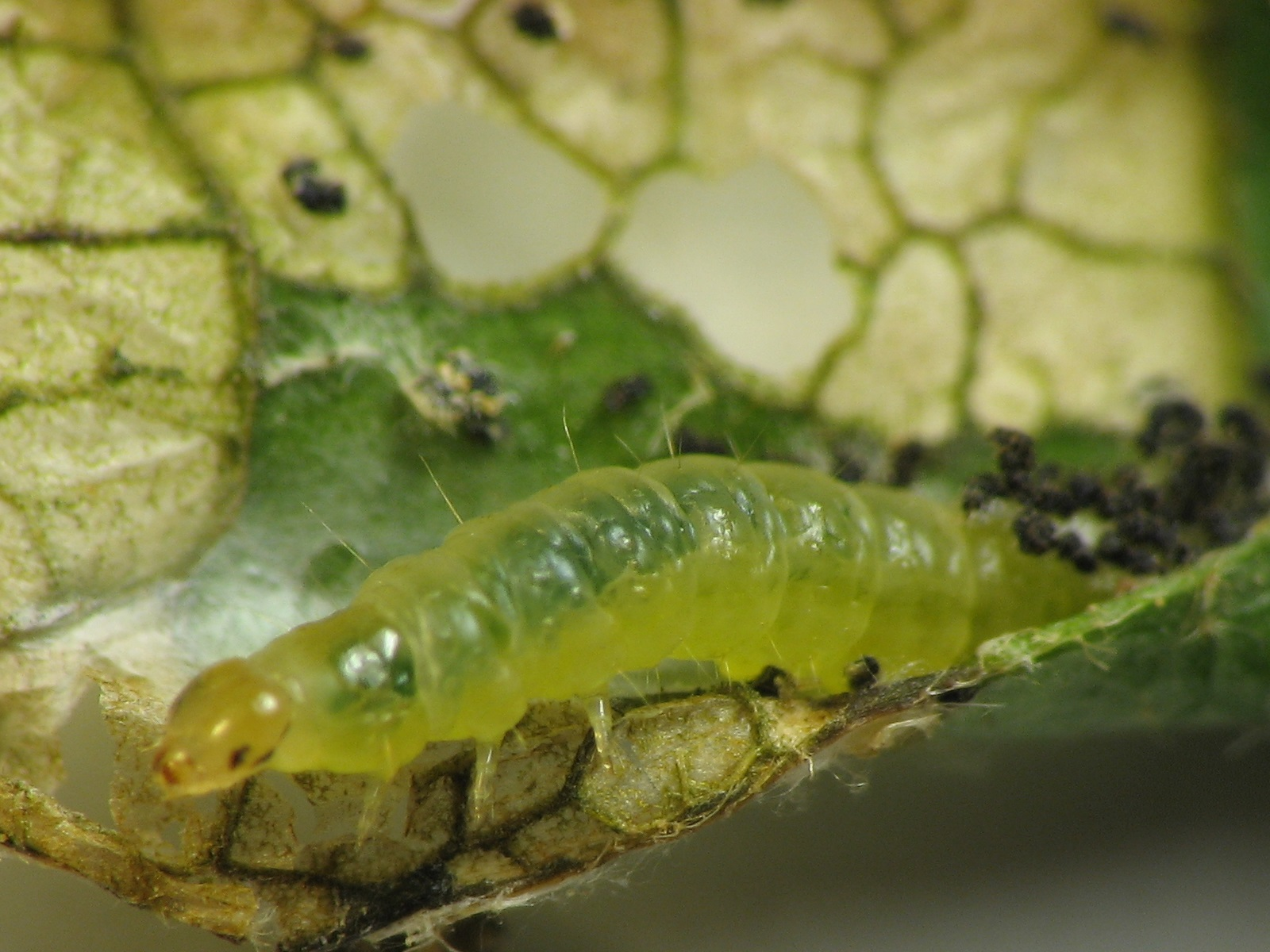
Pandemis limitata caterpillar

== See also ==
- Feces
- Guano
- Chitosan
- European spruce bark beetle
