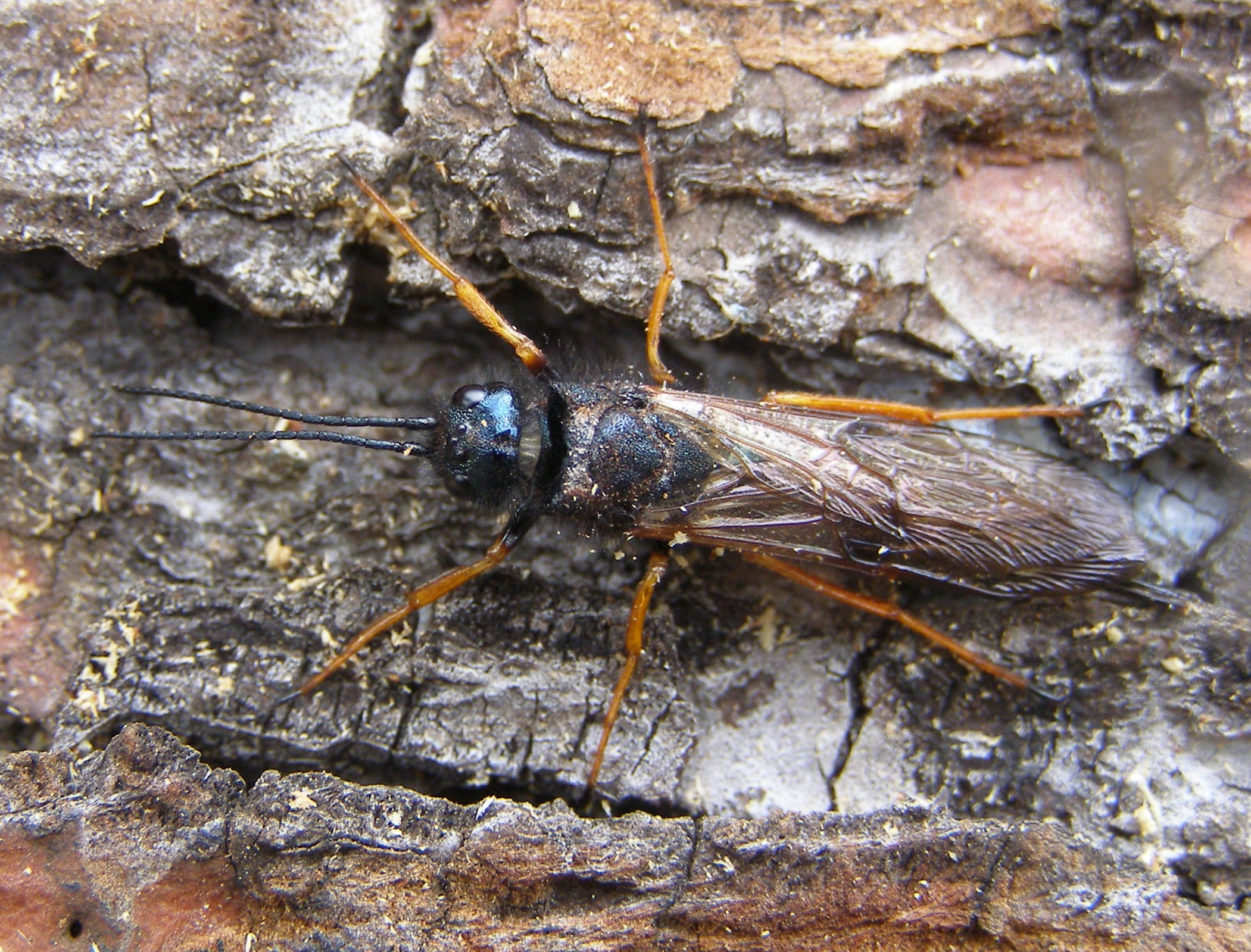
- Sirex noctilio

Scientific classification
- Kingdom: Animalia
- Phylum: Arthropoda
- Clade: Pancrustacea
- Class: Insecta
- Order: Hymenoptera
- Family: Siricidae
- Genus: Sirex; Linnaeus, 1760

Species
- see text

= Sirex =

Genus of sawflies

Sirex is a genus of sawfly in the family Siricidae, the horntails or wood wasps. Their bodies are black with a dark blue or green metallic reflection with some species having reddish-brown portions.

They inject eggs with fungal endosymbionts into wood. The larvae of Sirex are unable to digest the wood on their own and rely on the fungus for nutrition, either eating the fungus or wood partially digested by the fungus. Female Sirex have a mycangium which is used to carry arthrospores of the fungus.

The genus includes economically important pests; S. noctilio, known simply as the 'Sirex woodwasp' is an invasive species, having spread widely across the world from its original range.

== Species ==
- Sirex abietinus Goulet, 2012
- Sirex areolatus (Cresson, 1868)
- Sirex atricornis Kjellander, 1945
- Sirex behrensii (Cresson, 1880)
- Sirex californicus (Ashmead, 1904)
- Sirex carinthiacus Konow, 1892
- Sirex cinctus Drury, 1773
- Sirex cyaneus Fabricius, 1781
- Sirex ermak (Semenov, 1921)
- Sirex hispaniola Goulet, 2012
- Sirex imperialis W.F.Kirby, 1882
- Sirex juvencus (Linnaeus, 1758)
- Sirex longicauda Middlekauff, 1948
- Sirex melanopoda Benson, 1965
- Sirex mexicanus Smith, 2012
- Sirex mongolorum (Semenov)
- Sirex nigricornis Fabricius, 1781
- Sirex nitidus (Harris, 1841)
- Sirex nitobei Matsumura
- Sirex noctilio Fabricius, 1793
- Sirex obesus Bradley, 1913
- Sirex piceus G.Xiao & Wu, 1983
- Sirex pygmaeus Linnaeus, 1767
- Sirex sinicus Maa
- Sirex tianshanicus (Semenov)
- Sirex torvus Harris, 1779
- Sirex varipes Walker, 1866
- Sirex vates Mocsáry
- Sirex xerophilus Schiff, 2012
