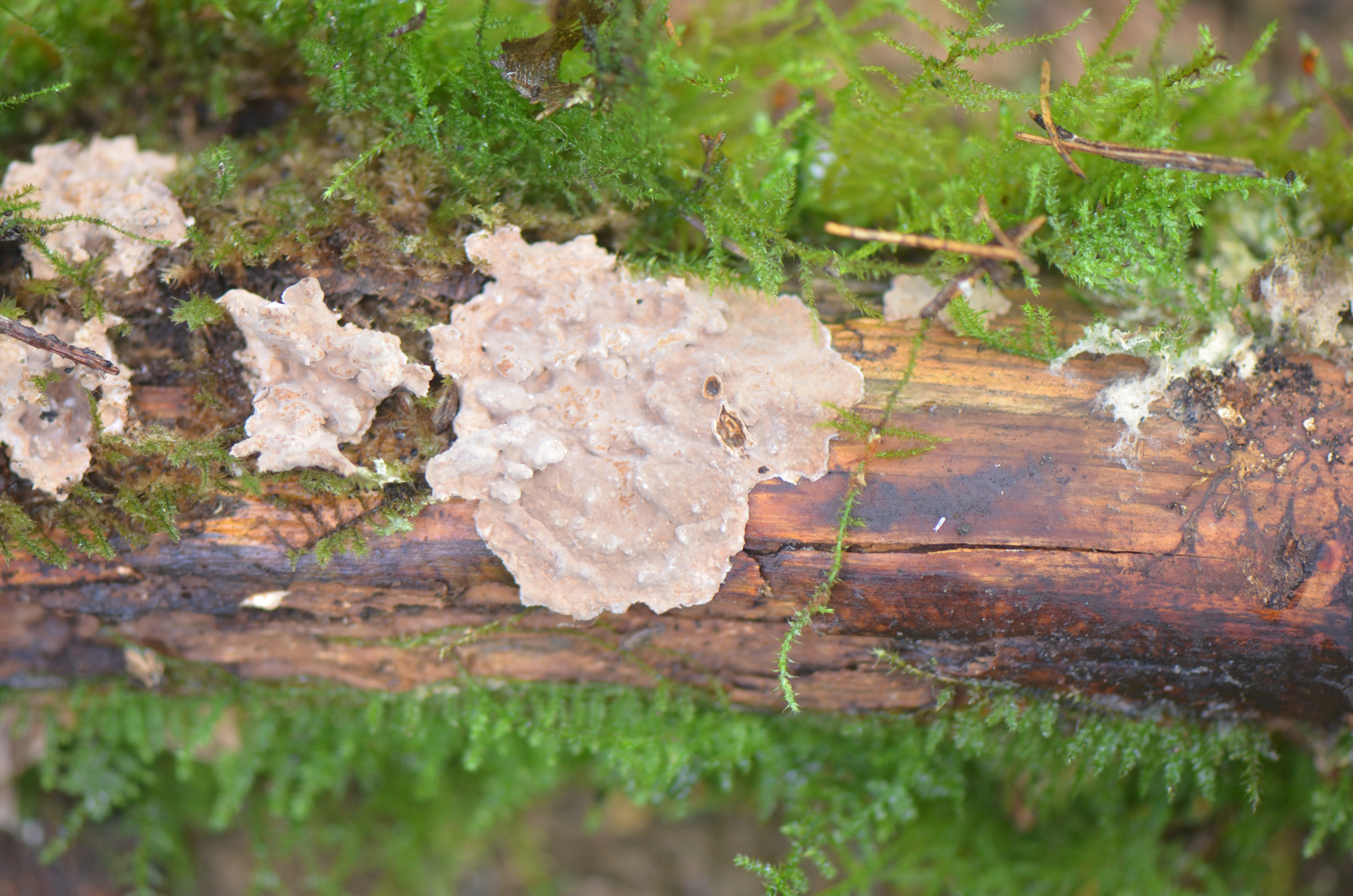

Scientific classification
- Domain: Eukaryota
- Kingdom: Fungi
- Division: Basidiomycota
- Class: Agaricomycetes
- Order: Russulales
- Family: Amylostereaceae
- Genus: Amylostereum
- Species: A. chailletii

Binomial name
- Amylostereum chailletii (Pers.) Boidin (1958)

Synonyms
- Thelephora chailletii Pers. (1822); Stereum chailletii (Pers.) Fr. (1838); Lloydella chailletii (Pers.) Bres. (1901); Lloydellopsis chailletii (Pers.) Pouzar (1959)

= Amylostereum chailletii =

Species of fungus

Amylostereum chailletii (powdered duster) is a species of crust fungus. It was originally described in 1822 as Thelephora chailletii by Christian Hendrik Persoon in 1822, and given its current name when it was moved into Amylostereum by Jacques Boidin in 1958. It causes a white rot, especially in spruce and fir species.
