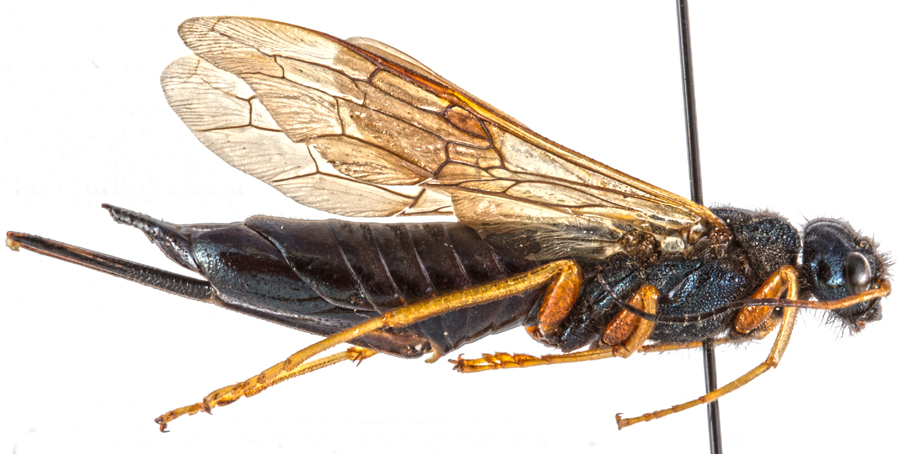

Scientific classification
- Domain: Eukaryota
- Kingdom: Animalia
- Phylum: Arthropoda
- Class: Insecta
- Order: Hymenoptera
- Family: Siricidae
- Genus: Sirex
- Species: S. cyaneus

Binomial name
- Sirex cyaneus Fabricius, 1781

Synonyms
- Sirex abbotii Kirby, 1882

= Sirex cyaneus =

Blue horntail

Species of sawfly

Sirex cyaneus (blue horntail) is a species of horntail in the genus Sirex. Native to forests in Alberta, they grow to 2 cm in length.
