= Saprobiont =

Organism that digests food externally

Saprobionts are organisms that digest their food externally and then absorb the products. This process is called saprotrophic nutrition. Fungi are examples of saprobiontic organisms, which are a type of decomposer.

Saprobiontic organisms feed off dead and/or decaying biological materials. Digestion is accomplished by excretion of digestive enzymes which break down cell tissues, allowing saprobionts to extract the nutrients they need while leaving the indigestible waste. This is called extracellular digestion. This is very important in ecosystems, for the nutrient cycle.

Saprobionts should not be confused with detritivores, another class of decomposers which digest internally.

These organisms can be good sources of extracellular enzymes for industrial processes such as the production of fruit juice. For instance, the fungus Aspergillus niger is used to produce pectinase, an enzyme which is used to break down pectin in juice concentrates, making the juice appear more translucent.
