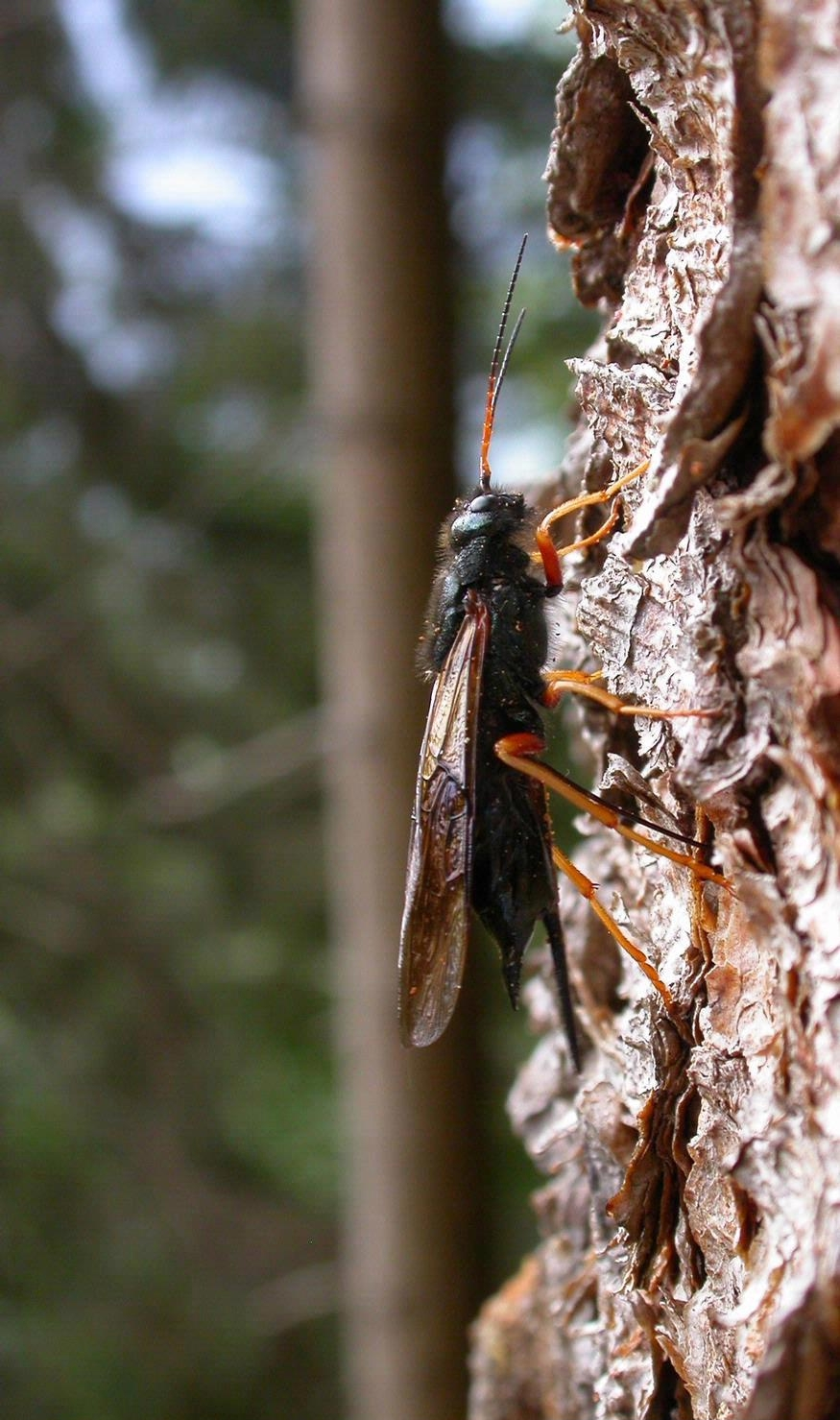

Scientific classification
- Kingdom: Animalia
- Phylum: Arthropoda
- Class: Insecta
- Order: Hymenoptera
- Family: Siricidae
- Genus: Sirex
- Species: S. juvencus

Binomial name
- Sirex juvencus (Linnaeus, 1758)

Synonyms
- Ichneumon juvencus Linnaeus, 1758

= Sirex juvencus =

Species of sawfly

Sirex juvencus is a species of horntail found in Europe, Siberia, Sakhalin Island, Japan, the Philippines, Algeria and several other countries. Its common name is steely-blue wood wasp because of its color.

== Description ==
Male adults are about 8–28 millimetres (0.3–1.1 in) long, and female adults are about 15–32 mm (0.6–1.3 in)long. The antennae are red and brown or red and black. They exhibit sexual dimorphism, which means the male and female are morphologically different. The female body has a metallic bluish-black colour with yellowish or reddish legs, and the last part of the abdomen is triangular and wide at the base. The ovipositor, which deposits the eggs, is as long as the abdomen or a little longer. The eggs are white and elongated, and the larvae are cylindrical, white, and can measure up to 40 mm (1.6 in). The male body has a metallic black body, with the first two sets of legs being reddish and the back legs being black. The abdomen is black with bluish-black dots on some parts of the abdomen and brownish dots on other parts.

== Reproduction ==
Adults fly from July to August to mate, and once they have mated, the female will drill several holes in wood and drop one to five eggs into that hole. The female can lay up to 100 eggs. Once the larvae hatch, they feed on the wood, but in the middle of summer they dig deeper into the wood until they are 15–17 mm (0.6–0.7 in) into it. The larvae stay there all winter, and in April, they feed off of sap from the tree. The larvae then make tunnels horizontally that are covered with shredded wood. Before they pupate, they would have made tunnels 80–230 mm (3.1–9.1 in) long where they will stay for the winter. They would finally turn into pupae in the summer. Once they are adults, they chew through the surface and leave a hole that is 4–6 mm (0.16–0.24 in) in diameter. Most of the time, this species only has one generation every two years.

== Impact ==
Sirex juvencus is considered a pest because it creates tunnels and holes, devaluing the wood. Mostly, it infests wounded, weakened, or dying wood. This wasp also spreads a symbiotic fungus that attacks wood.
