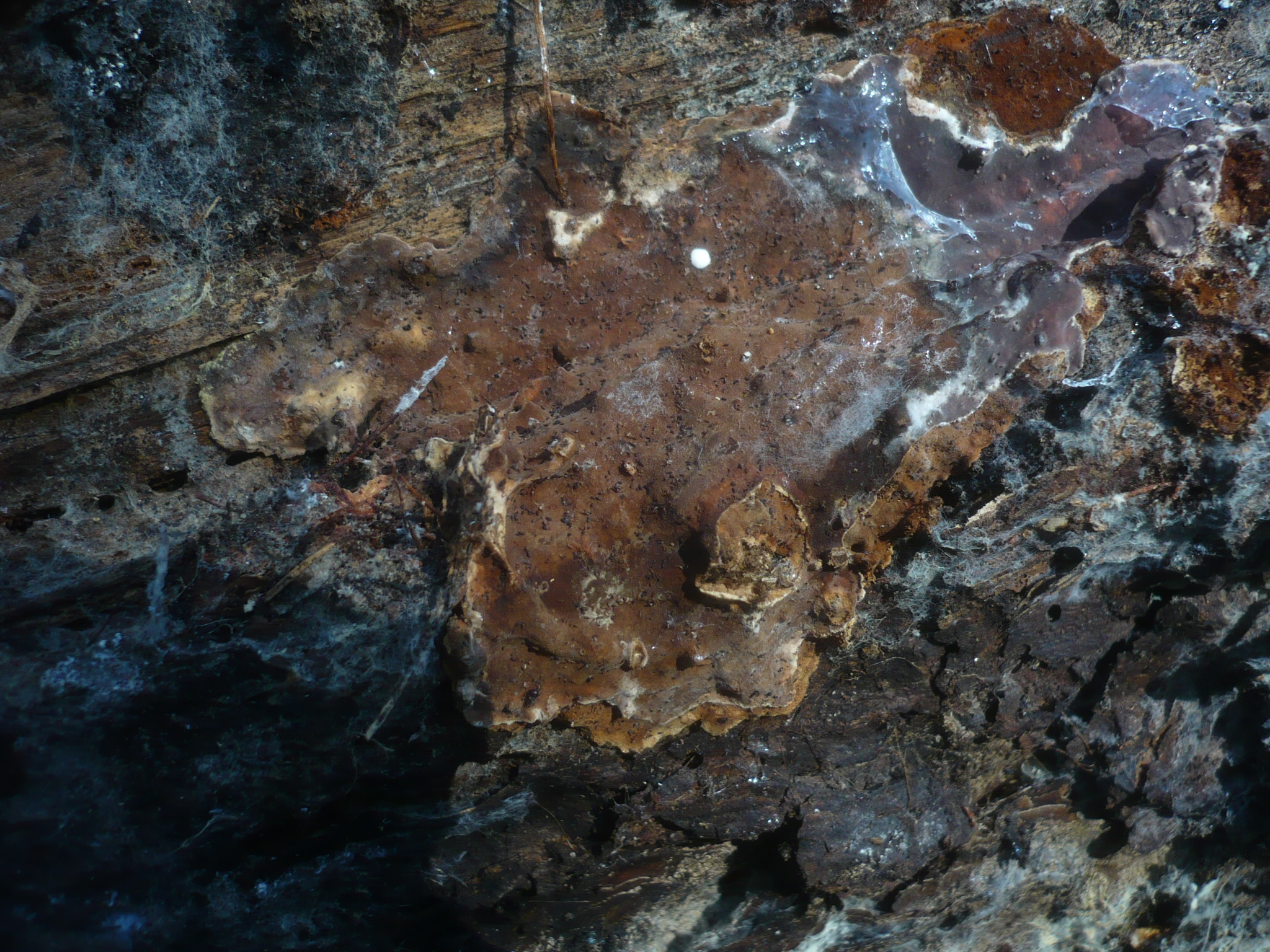

Scientific classification
- Domain: Eukaryota
- Kingdom: Fungi
- Division: Basidiomycota
- Class: Agaricomycetes
- Order: Russulales
- Family: Amylostereaceae
- Genus: Amylostereum
- Species: A. areolatum

Binomial name
- Amylostereum areolatum (Chaillet ex Fr.) Boidin (1958)

Synonyms
- Thelephora areolata Chaillet ex Fr. (1828); Stereum areolatum (Chaillet ex Fr.) Fr. (1838); Xylobolus areolatus (Chaillet ex Fr.) P.Karst. (1881); Lloydellopsis areolata (Chaillet ex Fr.) Pouzar (1959)

= Amylostereum areolatum =

Species of fungus

Amylostereum areolatum (patchy duster) is a species of crust fungus. Originally called Thelephora areolata in 1828, it was given its current name by French mycologist Jacques Boidin in 1958.
