= Oidium (spore) =

Type of fungal spore

An oidium (pl.: oidia) is an asexually produced fungal spore that (in contrast to conidia) is presumed not to constitute the main reproductive preoccupation of the fungus at that time. The hypha breaks up into component cells/ small pieces and develop into spores. Oidia cannot survive in unfavourable conditions.
