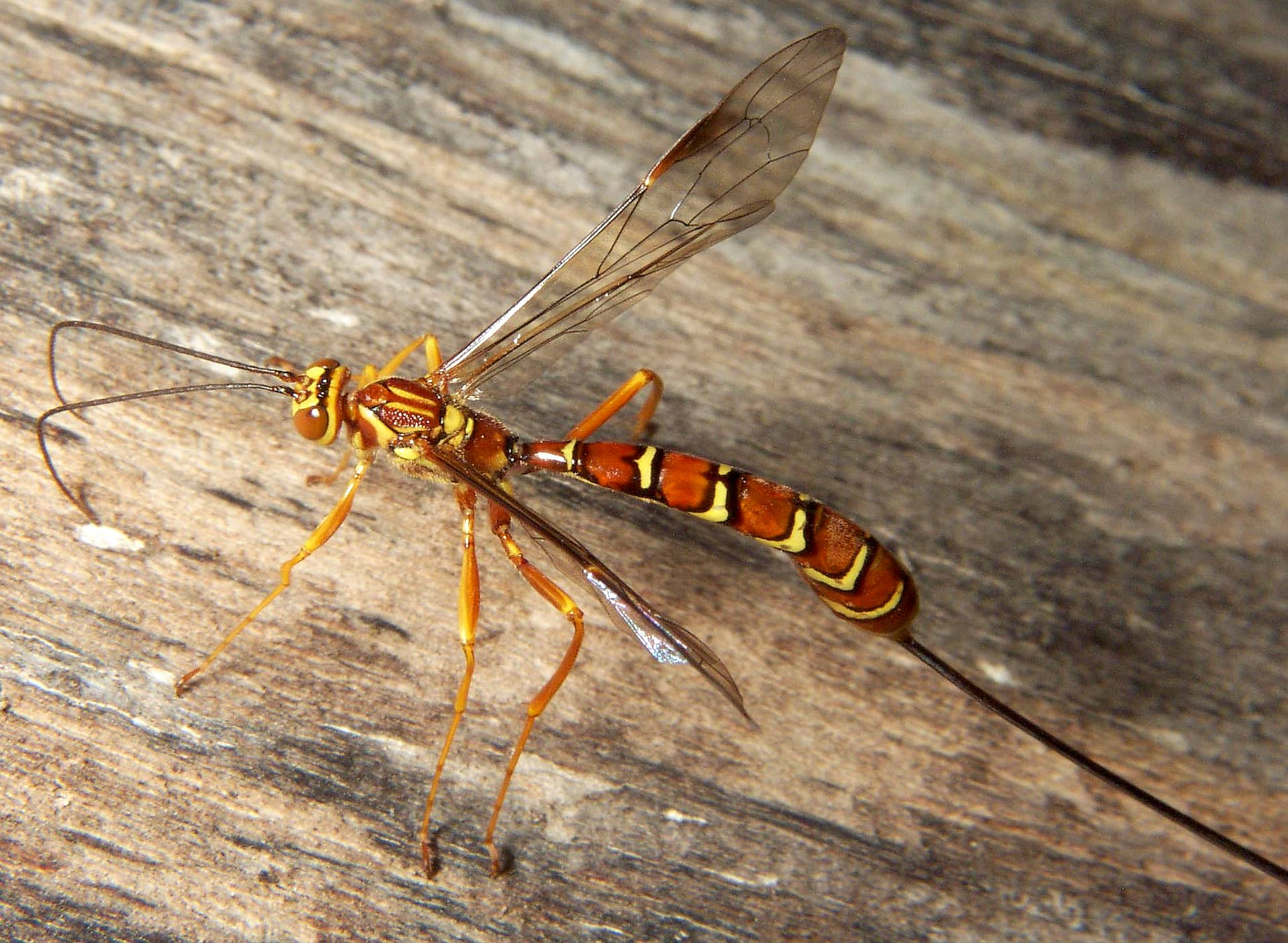
- Megarhyssa greenei female

Scientific classification
- Kingdom: Animalia
- Phylum: Arthropoda
- Clade: Pancrustacea
- Class: Insecta
- Order: Hymenoptera
- Suborder: Apocrita
- Superfamily: Ichneumonoidea; Latreille, 1802

Families
- Braconidae; Ichneumonidae; †Praeichneumonidae

= Ichneumonoidea =

Ichneumonoidea Temporal range: Cretaceous-Present

Superfamily of wasps

The superfamily Ichneumonoidea contains one extinct and two extant families, including the two largest families within Hymenoptera: Ichneumonidae and Braconidae. The group is thought to contain as many as 100,000 species, many of which have not yet been described. Like other parasitoid wasps, they were long placed in the "Parasitica", variously considered as an infraorder or an unranked clade, now known to be paraphyletic.

== Etymology ==
The name is derived from Latin 'ichneumon', from Ancient Greek ἰχνεύμων (ikhneúmōn, "tracker"), from ἴχνος (íkhnos, "track, footstep"). The name is shared with the Egyptian mongoose, Herpestes ichneumon.

== Description ==
The superfamily is defined by fusion of the costal and radial veins of the fore wing, and almost all species have more than 11 antennal segments. Both included families have a cosmopolitan distribution. Ichneumonoids have morphological similarities with relatives within the order Hymenoptera, including ants and bees. Ichneumonoidea contains a great deal of morphological diversity, with species ranging in size from 1 to 130 mm (0.039 to 5.118 in) long. Most are slender, and the females of many species (particularly in the genus Megarhyssa) have extremely long ovipositors for laying eggs.

The ichneumonid wasps may be more familiar to non-entomologists than braconids, as they are generally larger. The two families are distinguished from each other primarily by details of wing venation.

=== Braconidae ===
Most are brownish or black, not brightly colored. Forewings lack vein 2m-cu.

=== Ichneumonidae ===
Ichneumonids vary greatly in size and their color varies from brightly colored to uniform black. Forewings with vein 2m-cu present and tubular.

== Evolution ==
Parasitoidism evolved only once in the Hymenoptera during the Permian, leading to a single clade which contains the Apocrita and the Orussoidea, but has been secondarily lost multiple times. The Apocrita emerged from that clade during the Jurassic.

- Hymenoptera
  - Sawflies
  - parasitoidism
    - Orussoidea
    - Apocrita wasp waist
      - Ichneumonoidea
        - Ichneumonidae
        - - Braconidae
      - - Chalcidoidea and allies
        - Aculeata

== Parasitic life cycle ==
Ichneumonoids are solitary insects, and the vast majority are parasitoids; the larvae feed on or in another insect until it finally dies. Most hosts are holometabolous insect larvae, but there are many exceptions. In general, ichneumonoids are host specific, and only attack one or a few closely related host species. Many species use polydnaviruses to suppress the immune systems of their host insects. Due to the wide variety in hosts and lifestyles, see subfamily pages for more detail.

The female ichneumonoid finds a host and lays an egg on, near, or inside the host's body. The ovipositor of ichneumonoids generally cannot deliver a sting as many wasps or bees do. It can be used to bore wood and lay eggs on hosts deep inside, or reach hosts hidden inside leaf shelters. Upon hatching, the larva feeds either externally or internally, killing the host when it is ready to pupate.

Various ichneumonoids are used as biological control agents in controlling horticultural or forest pests. An example is the relationship between the species Ichneumon eumerus and its host butterfly Phengaris rebeli. The butterfly larva is itself a parasite within Myrmica ant nests. The adult I. eumerus searches for ant nests and only enters when they contain P. rebeli caterpillars. Once inside, it oviposits within the caterpillars and escapes the nest by releasing a chemical which causes the worker ants to fight each other rather than the intruding wasp. The wasp eggs then hatch inside the caterpillar and eventually consume and kill the host.

Life cycle of Hercus fontinalis

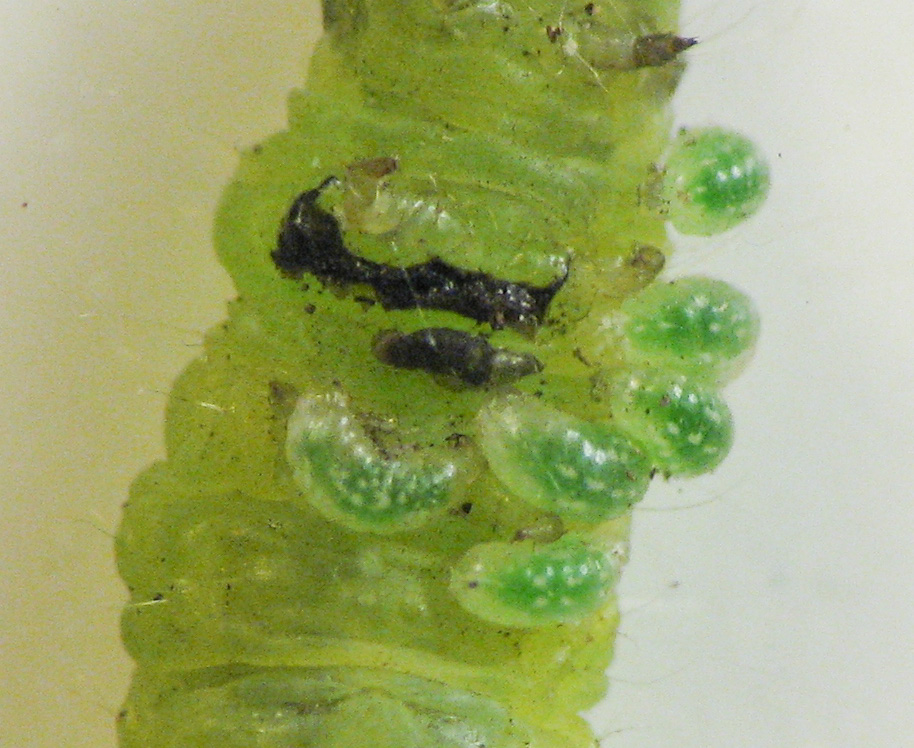
Early instar larvae on caterpillar

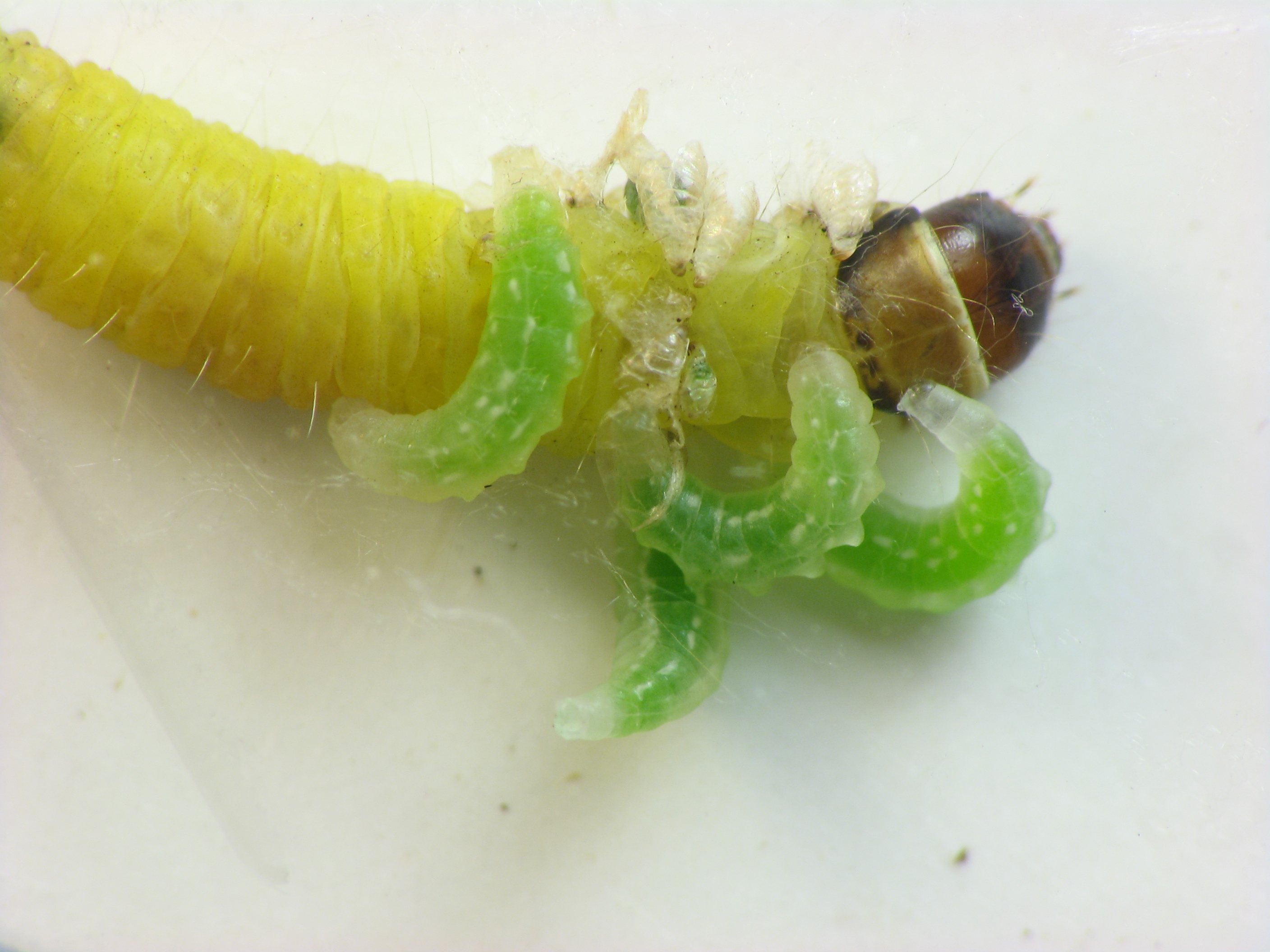
Later instar larvae

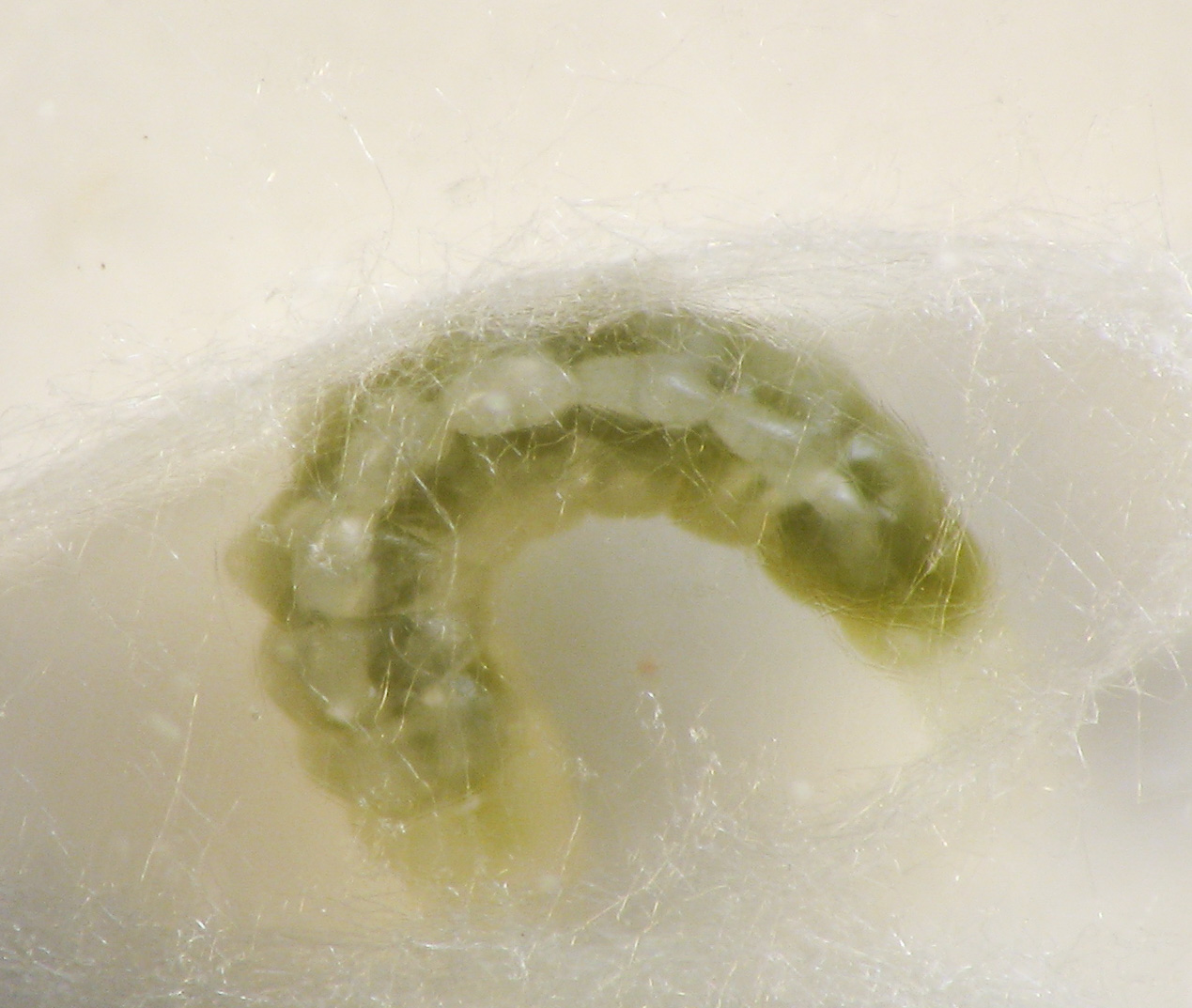
Final instar larvae building cocoon

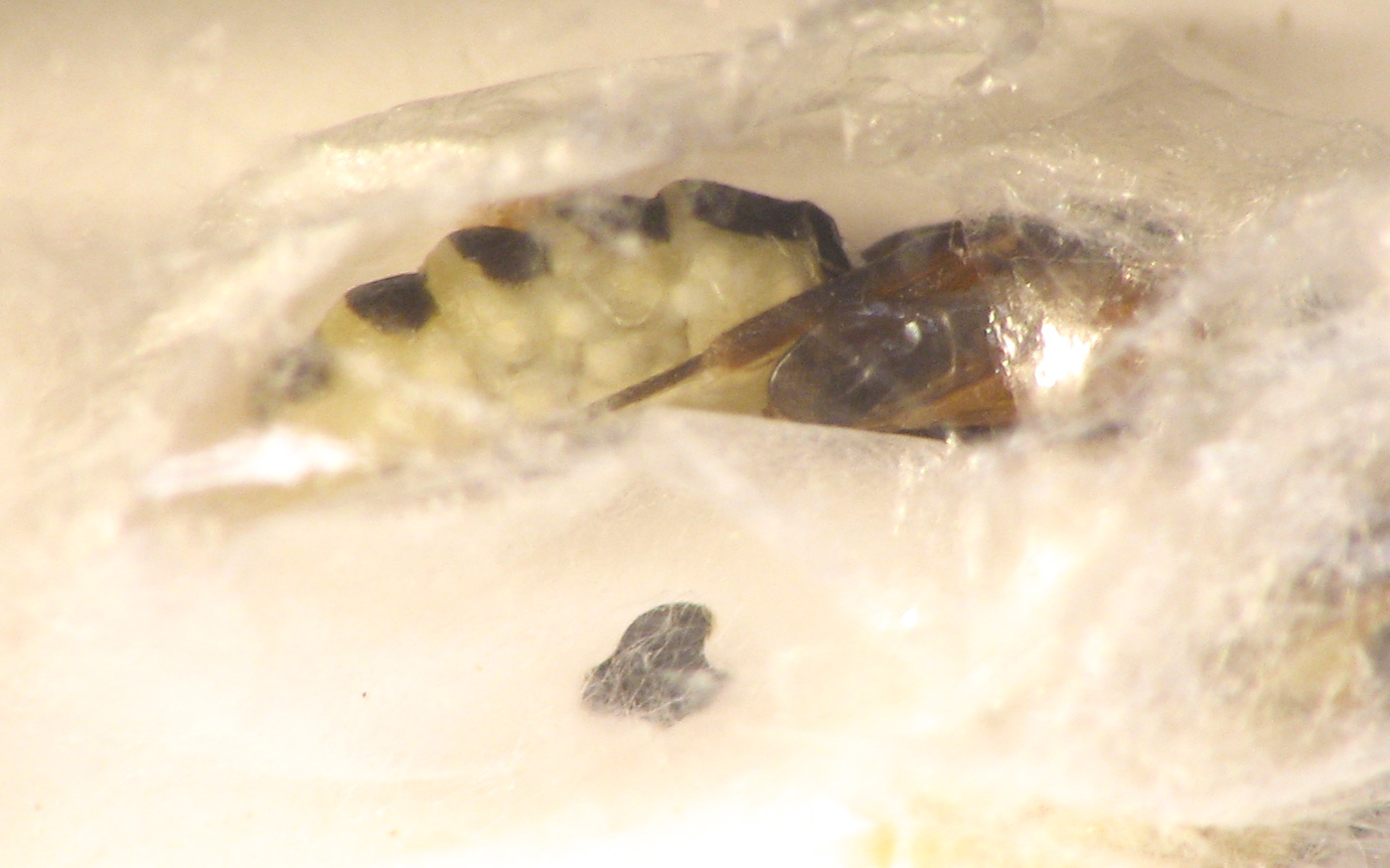
Pupa inside cocoon

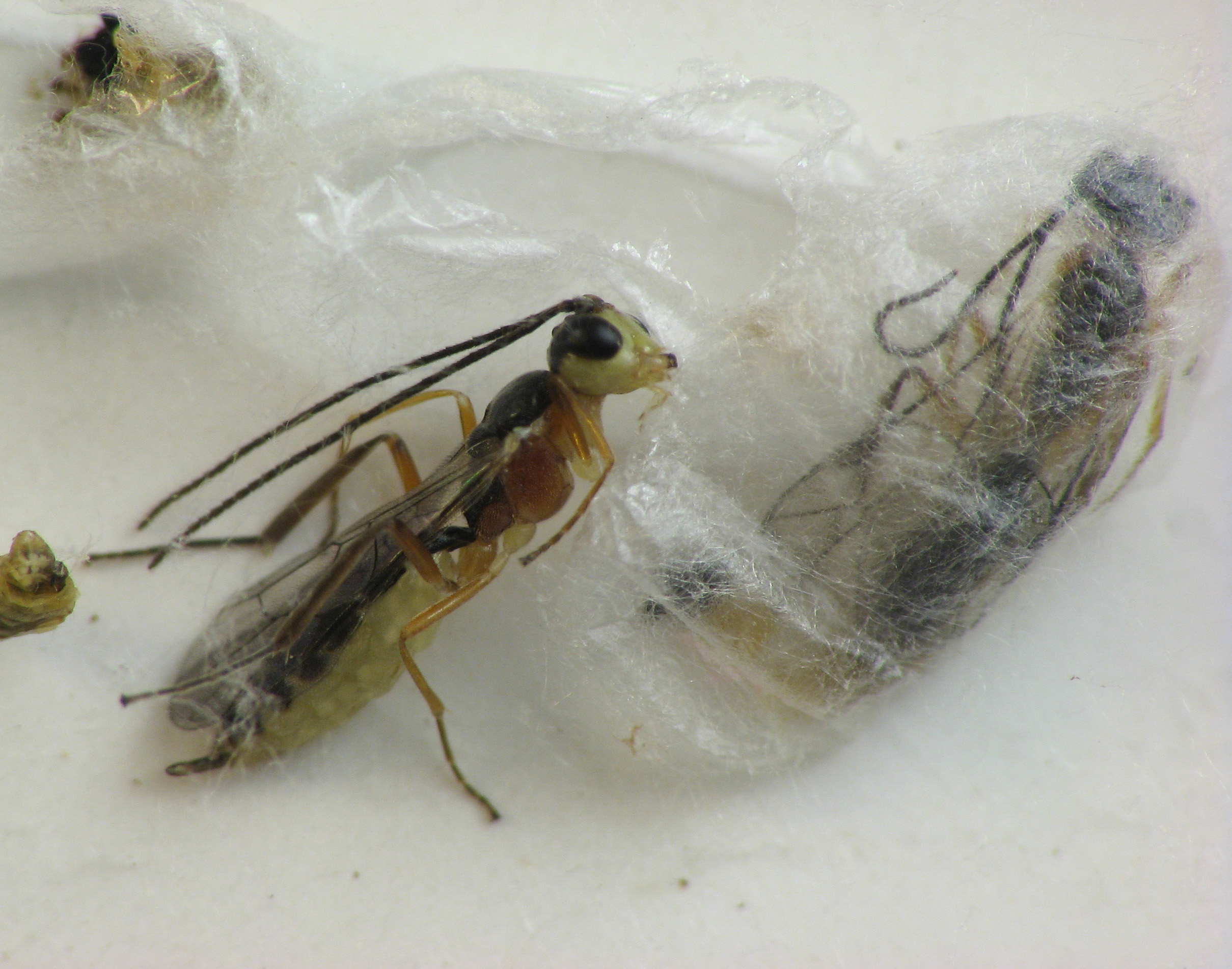
Adults emerging from cocoons

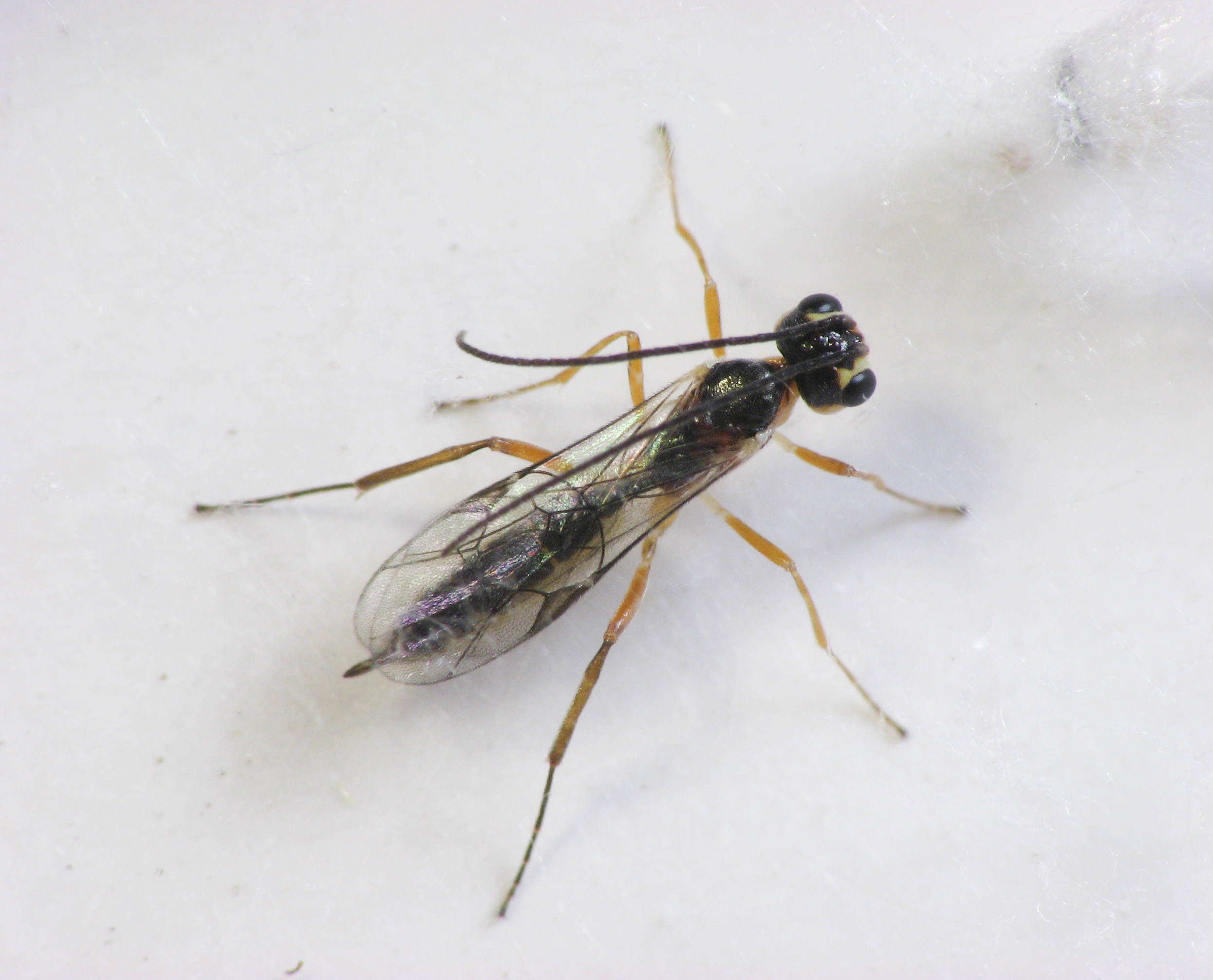
Adult female
