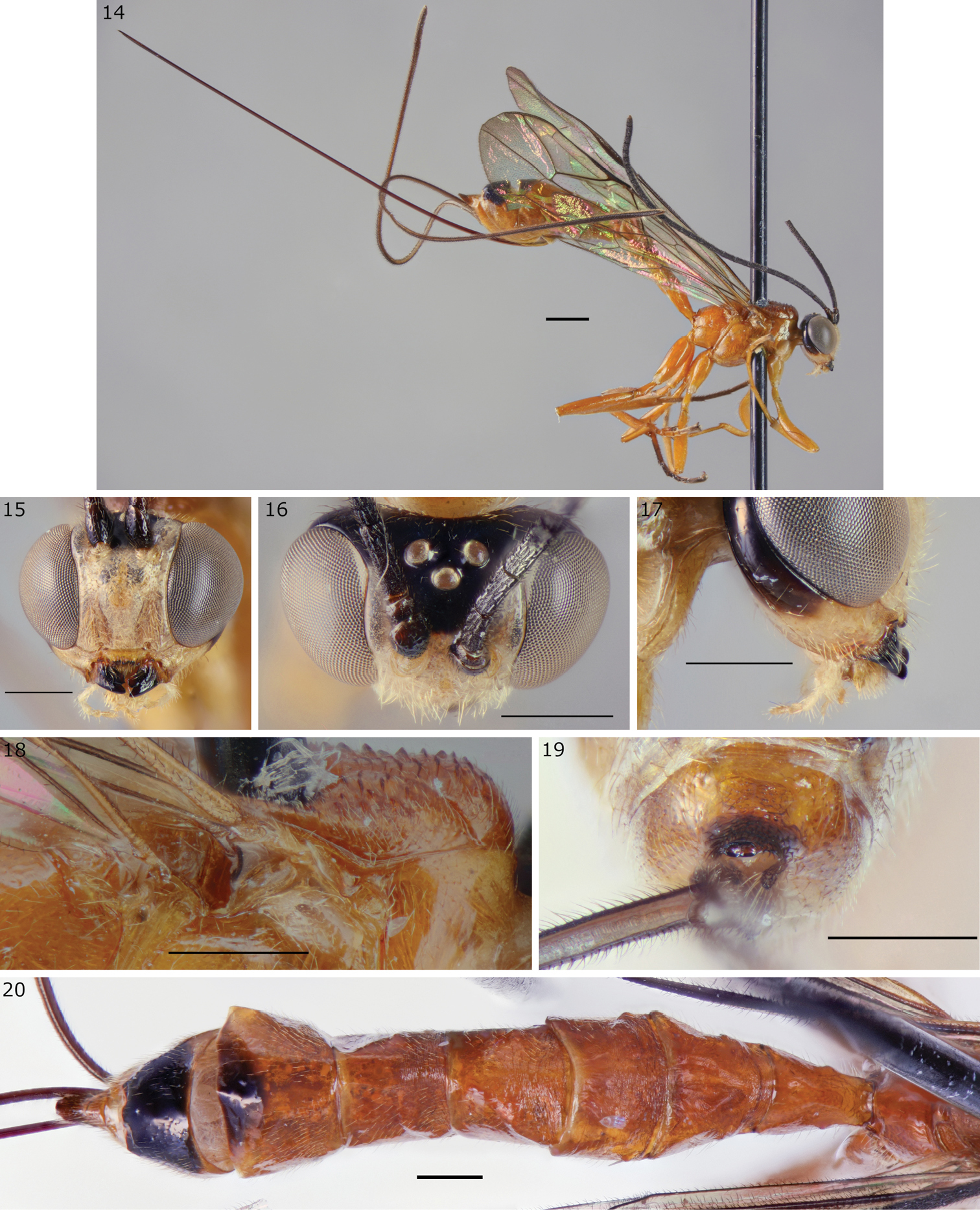
- Rhyssinae (10.3897-zookeys.878.37845) Figures

Scientific classification
- Kingdom: Animalia
- Phylum: Arthropoda
- Clade: Pancrustacea
- Class: Insecta
- Order: Hymenoptera
- Family: Ichneumonidae
- Genus: Epirhyssa
- Species: E. johanna

Binomial name
- Epirhyssa johanna Hopkins, 2019

= Epirhyssa johanna =

Species of wasp

Epirhyssa johanna is a parasitoid wasp native to Uganda. The species was described in 2019 from 382 months of malaise trap samples in a successional forest habitat that generally yielded only a few Rhyssines.

== Description ==
Adults are 8.4 millimetres (0.33 in) in length and are of an overall orange color, with a white face, lower ¼ of the genae, lateral frons, and black antenna, mandibles, median frons, occiput, upper genae and on apical half of tergite 6 and an entirely black 7th tergite. The hind tarsi are dark brown. The ovipositor has a dark sheath. Wings are hyaline and faintly infuscate near the apex.

The front of the head appears to not have a median carinae nor a lateral carinae because the head is very smooth or very faintly punctuate. The occipital carina is interrupted dorsally and interrupted or extremely faint near hypostomal carina. The hypostomal carina is raised into a low flange and is slightly less or equivalent to the maximum width of the second maxillary palp segment. The clypeus is sparsely punctuate with a median apical tubercle. The antenna has 28 flagellomeres.

The mesosoma has a subalar prominence without a lateral flange. The mesopleuron doesn't have a flange when it's along the dorsal margin. The forewing has 2 m-cu veins that are distal to the rs-m. The metasoma has an flat elliptical tip on the apical horn in posterior view. The tergites are mostly smooth with the anterior sides of the tergites 2-6 medially striate. The 1st tergite is 1.2x as long as how apically wide it is. Male anatomy is unknown.

== Etymology ==
Its name, Johanna is named to dedicate Johanna Hopkins, the first author of the academic publishing's wife. The species is only known for its only holotype that the author describes as "quite exceptional".
