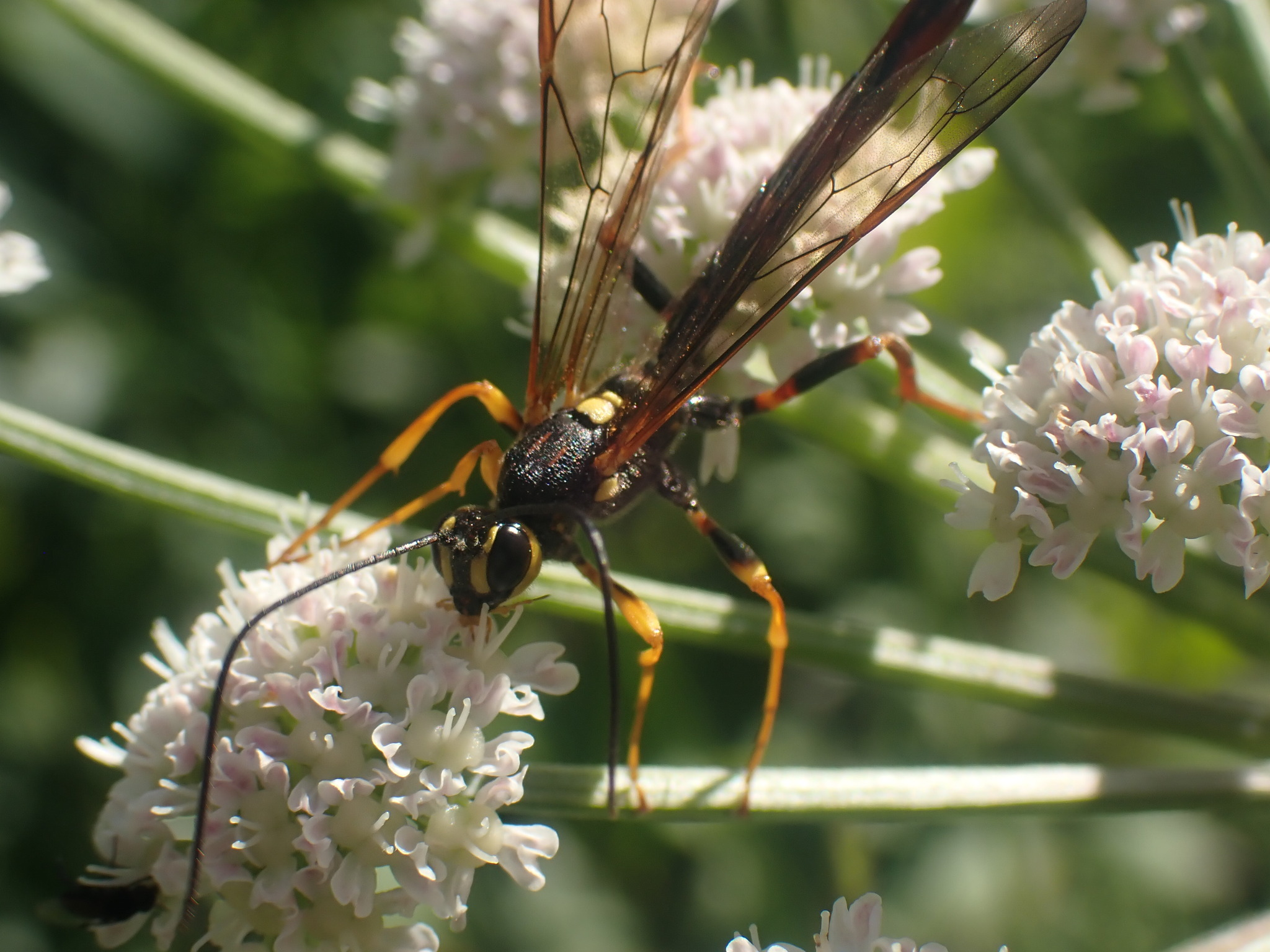
- Akamina-Kishinena Provincial Park, British Columbia

Scientific classification
- Domain: Eukaryota
- Kingdom: Animalia
- Phylum: Arthropoda
- Class: Insecta
- Order: Hymenoptera
- Family: Ichneumonidae
- Subfamily: Rhyssinae
- Genus: Megarhyssa
- Species: M. nortoni

Binomial name
- Megarhyssa nortoni (Cresson, 1864)

= Megarhyssa nortoni =

Species of wasp

Megarhyssa nortoni, also known as Norton's giant ichneumonid wasp or the western giant ichneumonid wasp, is a species of large ichneumon wasp.

== Subspecies ==
There are two described subspecies of Megarhyssa nortoni:

- M. nortoni nortoni (Cresson, 1864) (western US and southwestern Canada)
- M. nortoni quebecensis (Provancher, 1873) (northeastern US and southeastern Canada)

== Description and identification ==
Megarhyssa nortoni is black, reddish brown, and yellow and has distinguishing round yellow spots down the side of the abdomen. Its legs are mostly yellow. Its wings are transparent, and the body is elongated with a length of 1.4 inches (36 mm). The female is notable for an ovipositor of 2 inches (51 mm) to 3 inches (76 mm) in length. The male is less colorful with no ovipositor.

== Distribution and habitat ==
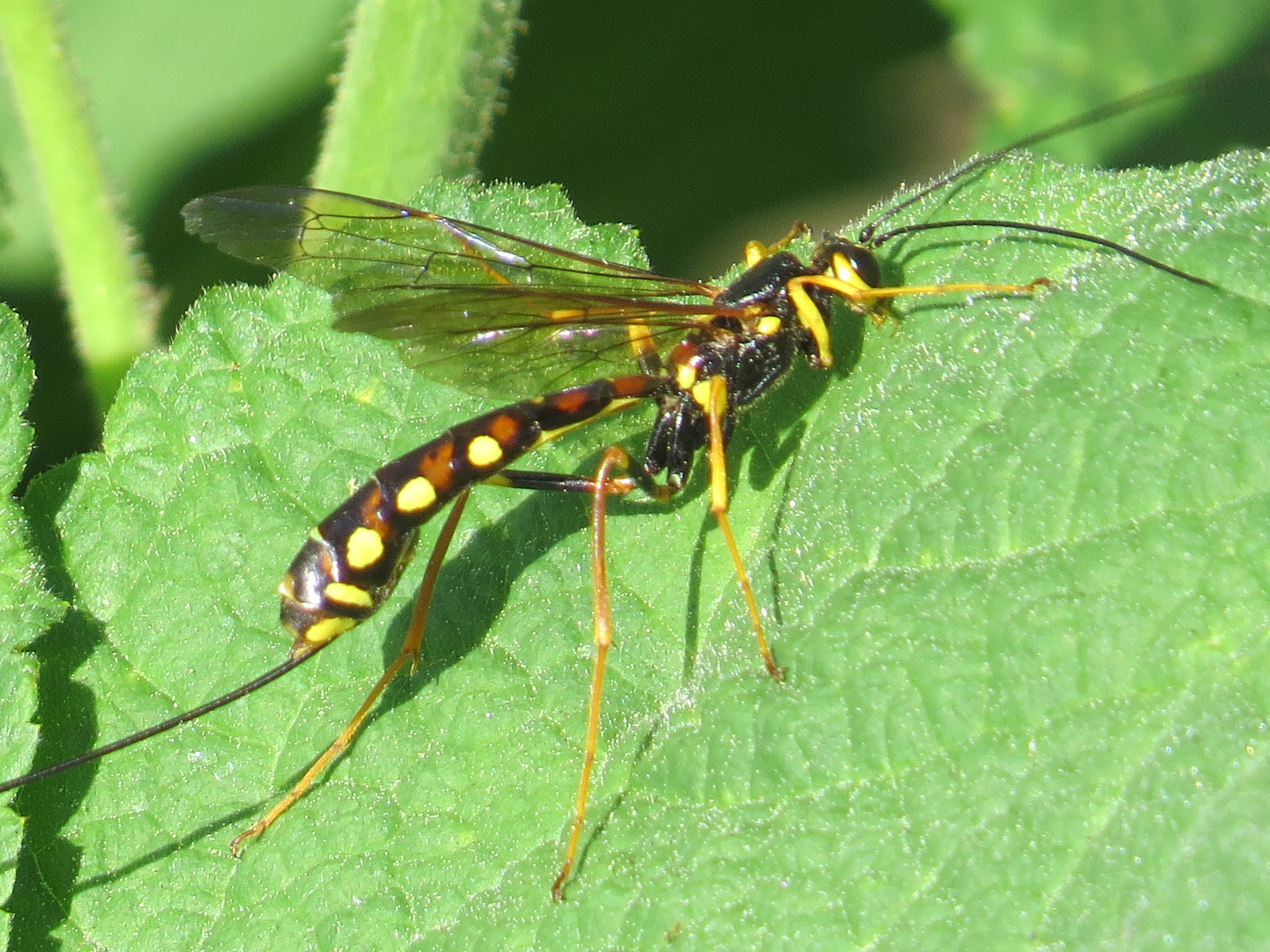
Female in El Dorado County, 2023

This species is native to North America including parts of the United States and Canada. The subspecies M. nortoni nortoni has a western distribution from the Pacific Coast to Colorado while the subspecies M. nortoni quebecensis has an eastern distribution from the northeastern US and southeastern Canada. It is found in coniferous forests where horntail larvae are present.

It has also been introduced to Australia, New Zealand, Tasmania, Brazil, and South Africa to help control horntail forest pests.

== Behavior ==
Megarhyssa nortoni is a predatory insect. Its larvae are parasitoids of horntail wasp larvae in coniferous trees. The adult female hunts horntail larvae for egg placement. It smells wood-eating fungus, utilized by the horntail larvae to predigest wood pulp, and uses its antennae to detect vibrations made by the horntail larvae. The female M. nortoni curls its ovipositor over its abdomen to insert the tip of the ovipositor at a right angle into the bark and cuts into the tree until it reaches the horntail larval tunnel. The female then deposits a very slender egg through its ovipositor into the tunnel on or near the horntail larva. The M. nortoni larva then hatches to eat the live horntail larval host from the inside causing the horntail larva's eventual death. The M. nortoni larva pupates inside its host and emerges the following summer as an adult.

Although imposing, the female M. nortoni does not sting and is harmless to humans. Adult M. nortoni feed on nectar and water.
