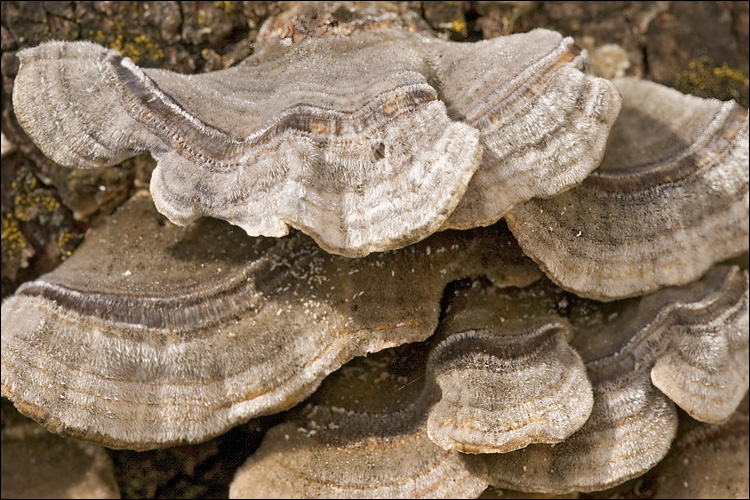

Scientific classification
- Kingdom: Fungi
- Division: Basidiomycota
- Class: Agaricomycetes
- Order: Polyporales
- Family: Polyporaceae
- Genus: Cerrena
- Species: C. unicolor

Binomial name
- Cerrena unicolor (Bull.) Murrill (1903)

Synonyms
- Boletus unicolor Bull. (1785); Daedalea cinerea Fr. (1815); Polyporus latissimus Fr. (1815); Daedalea unicolor (Bull.) Fr. (1821); Phyllodontia magnusii P. Karst. (1883); Daedaleopsis incana P. Karst. (1904); Bulliardia grisea Lázaro Ibiza (1916); Bulliardia nigrozonata Lázaro Ibiza (1916); Daedalea lobata Velen. (1922); Trametes unicolor (Bull.) Pilát (1939)

= Cerrena unicolor =

Species of fungus

Cerrena unicolor
- Mycological characteristics
- Pores on hymenium
- Cap is offset
- Hymenium attachment is not applicable
- Lacks a stipe
- Spore print is white
- Ecology is saprotrophic or parasitic
- Edibility is inedible

Cerrena unicolor, commonly known as the mossy maze polypore, is a species of poroid fungus in the genus Cerrena. The saprobic fungus causes white rot.

== Taxonomy ==
The fungus was originally described by French botanist Jean Bulliard in 1785 as Boletus unicolor, when all pored fungi were typically assigned to genus Boletus. William Alphonso Murrill transferred it to Cerrena in 1903. The fungus has acquired a long and extensive synonymy as it has been re-described under many different names, and been transferred to many polypore genera.

== Description ==
Cerrena unicolor has fruit bodies that are semicircular, wavy brackets up to 10 centimeters (4 in) wide, in groups of 2–20. Attached to the growing surface without a stalk (sessile), the upper surface is finely hairy, white to grayish brown in color, and in zonate—marked with zones or concentric bands of color. The surface is often green from algal growth. The pore surface is whitish in young specimens, later turning gray in maturity. The arrangement of the pores resembles a maze of slots; the tubes may extend to 4 mm deep. With age, the pores descend into tooth like structures. The spore print is white.

Spores are elliptical in shape, smooth, hyaline, inamyloid, and have dimensions of 5–7 by 2.5–4 μm. The basidia are 4-spored, 20–25 x 5–6 μm in size and have basal clamps. The cystidia are 40–60 x 4-5 μm and thin-walled.

The hyphal system is trimitic (containing generative, skeletal and binding hyphae). The generative context hyphae are 2–4 μm, thin-walled and nodose-septate, while the skeletal context hyphae are wider, thicker and have no septa. The binding and tramal hyphae are 2–4 μm wide, have thick walls but no septa, and are quite branched.

=== Similar species ===
Cerrena unicolor can be easily distinguished from most other polypores by its hairy upper surface and maze-like pores that slowly descend into tooth-like structures. Confusion can arise with other smaller polypores such as the genera Trichaptum or Trametes.

Trichaptum species that are young can easily be distinguished by their purple tinge. Older specimens however need careful examination of their pore shapes, which will either be gill-like or angular, versus those of C. unicolor, which are maze-like. Trichaptum perrottetii can also have maze-like pores in old age and can instead be distinguished by its flattened forked hairs on the upper surface. In North America T. perrottetii is only known from Florida and Georgia.

Some Trametes species can be similar with hairy caps and labyrinth like pores, but they will never have pores descending into teeth like structures. Trametes species are also more flexible in old age, while C. unicolor will become brittle and break easily. Two Trametes species with maze-like pores, Trametes gibbosa and T. aesculi, have lumpy/warted caps.

Trametopsis cervina will have a cinnamon colored pore surface and a less conspicuously zonate cap.

Daedalea quercina has thick walled pores and the upper surface is velvety at most, rather than hairy. Daedaleopsis confragosa has pores that bruise brown and also does not have as hairy of a cap. Both of these species are overall more brown in color, but can fade in age.

== Ecology ==
Cerrena unicolor causes canker rot and decay in paper birch (Betula papyrifera) and sugar maple (Acer saccharum) . It causes white rot on deciduous hardwoods, and rarely on conifers. It is found year-round.

When a female wasp of the genus Tremex bores into wood near these fungi, spores will become trapped in the wasp's ovipositor. The spores are carried with the wasp's eggs and will eventually germinate where the eggs are placed. As the spores germinate and form a mycelium, the wasp's eggs will hatch, and the newly-born larvae eat the mycelium. The wasp species Tremex columba requires C. unicolor to grow, as without the interaction, the larvae will die. However, the parasitic wasp genus Megarhyssa will lay its own eggs within the larvae of the Tremex wasp. The larvae of Megarhyssa, when hatched, proceed to eat the larvae of Tremex, helping control the population of Tremex.

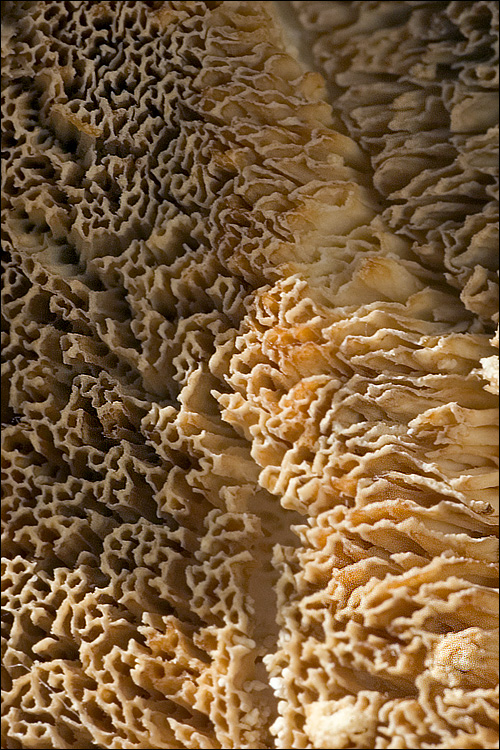
Pore surface magnified

== Distribution ==
The fungus has a wide distribution, and is found in Asia, Europe, South America, and North America.

== Potential uses ==
Cerrena unicolor has been identified as a source of the enzyme laccase. This enzyme has potential applications in a wide variety of bioprocesses. C. unicolor is known to produce laccase in culture at more favorable conditions and in higher yield than other wood rotting fungi, and research is focussing on ways to produce laccase cost-effectively on a large scale.

It is inedible to humans.
