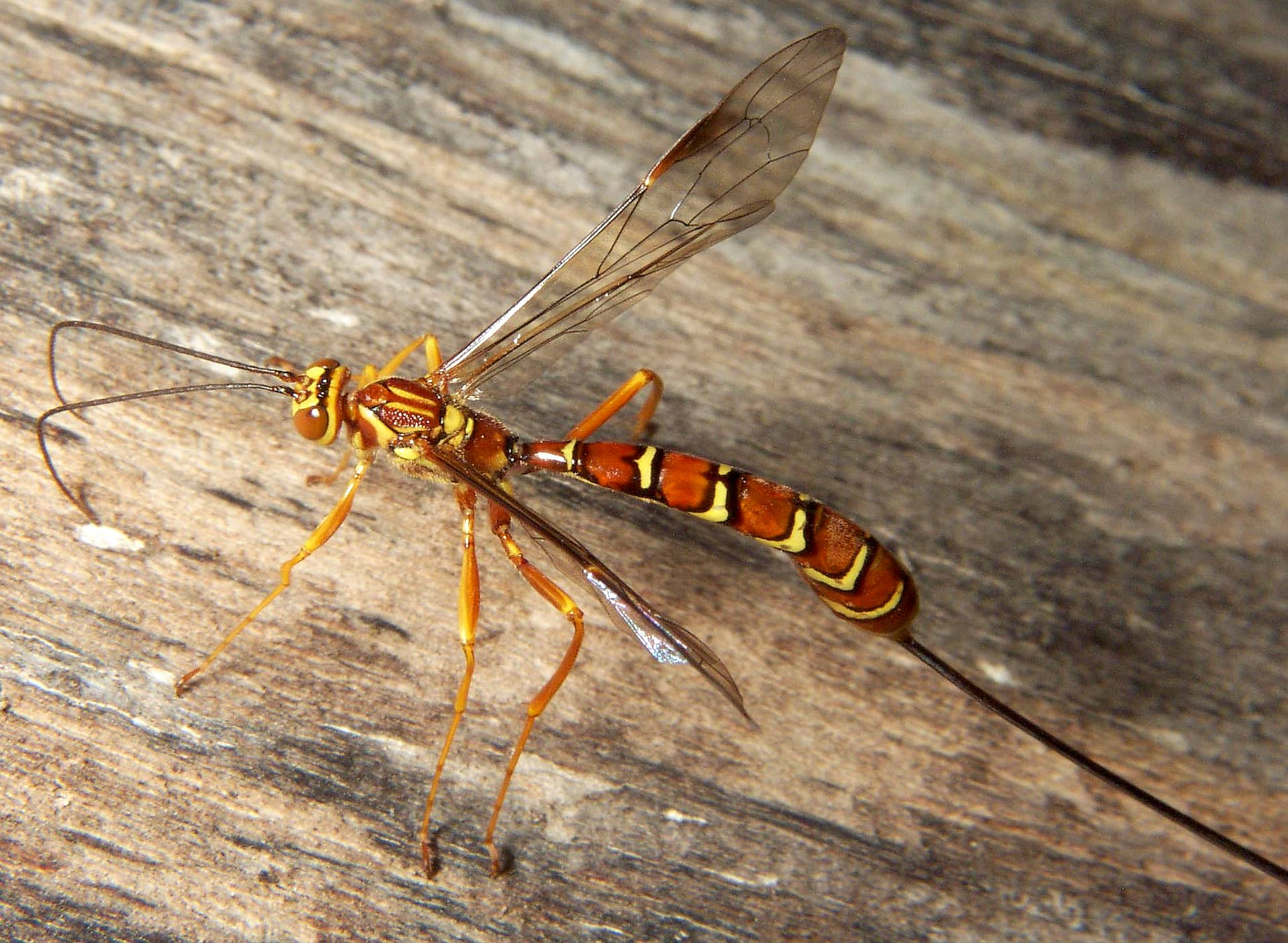

Scientific classification
- Domain: Eukaryota
- Kingdom: Animalia
- Phylum: Arthropoda
- Class: Insecta
- Order: Hymenoptera
- Family: Ichneumonidae
- Subfamily: Rhyssinae
- Genus: Megarhyssa
- Species: M. greenei

Binomial name
- Megarhyssa greenei Viereck, 1911

= Megarhyssa greenei =

Species of wasp

Megarhyssa greenei, also known as Greene's giant ichneumonid wasp, is a species of large ichneumon wasp. It is known from the United States and Canada.

== Description and identification ==
It is very similar in appearance to Megarhyssa macrurus, but the latter species has a relatively longer ovipositor (about 2x the total body length, where greenei is only slightly greater than 1x), and usually has more extensive dark wing markings. M. greenei also lacks the dark striping on the face present on M. macrurus.

== Ecology ==
M. greenei is a parasitoid wasp, and its host is Tremex columba, a sawfly. Females must find a larva of this species, and lay an egg close by or on it. The larva of Megarhyssa devours it, it pupates under the bark of trees, and it emerges as an adult one year later.
