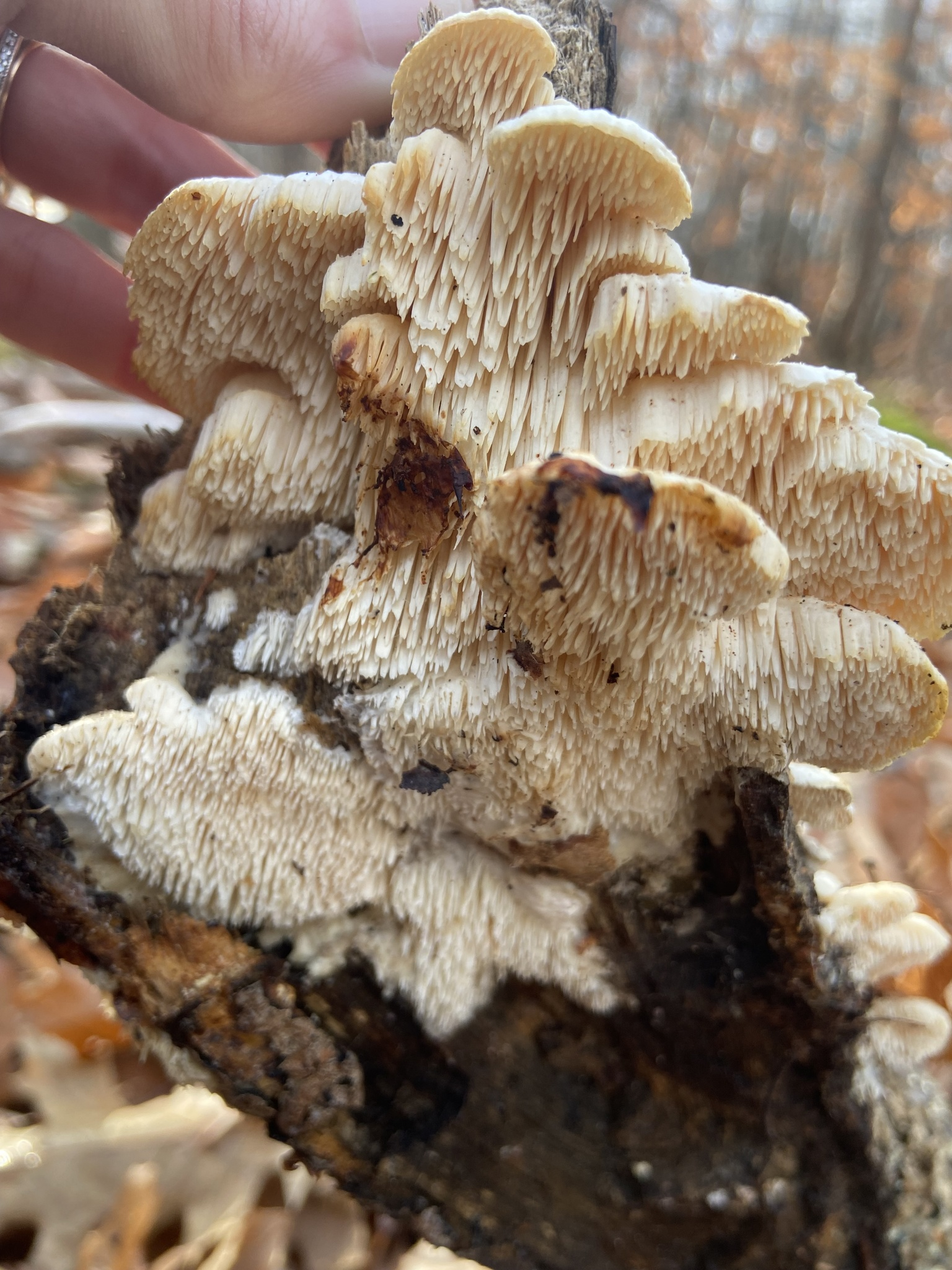
- Irpiciporus pachyodon

Scientific classification
- Domain: Eukaryota
- Kingdom: Fungi
- Division: Basidiomycota
- Class: Agaricomycetes
- Order: Polyporales
- Family: Polyporaceae
- Genus: Irpiciporus; Murrill, 1905

= Irpiciporus =

Genus of fungi

Irpiciporus is a genus of fungi belonging to the family Polyporaceae.

The species of this genus are found in Europe, Central Asia and Northern America.

Species:

- Irpiciporus japonicus Nohara
- Irpiciporus litschaueri (Lohwag) Zmitr.
- Irpiciporus tanakae Nohara
