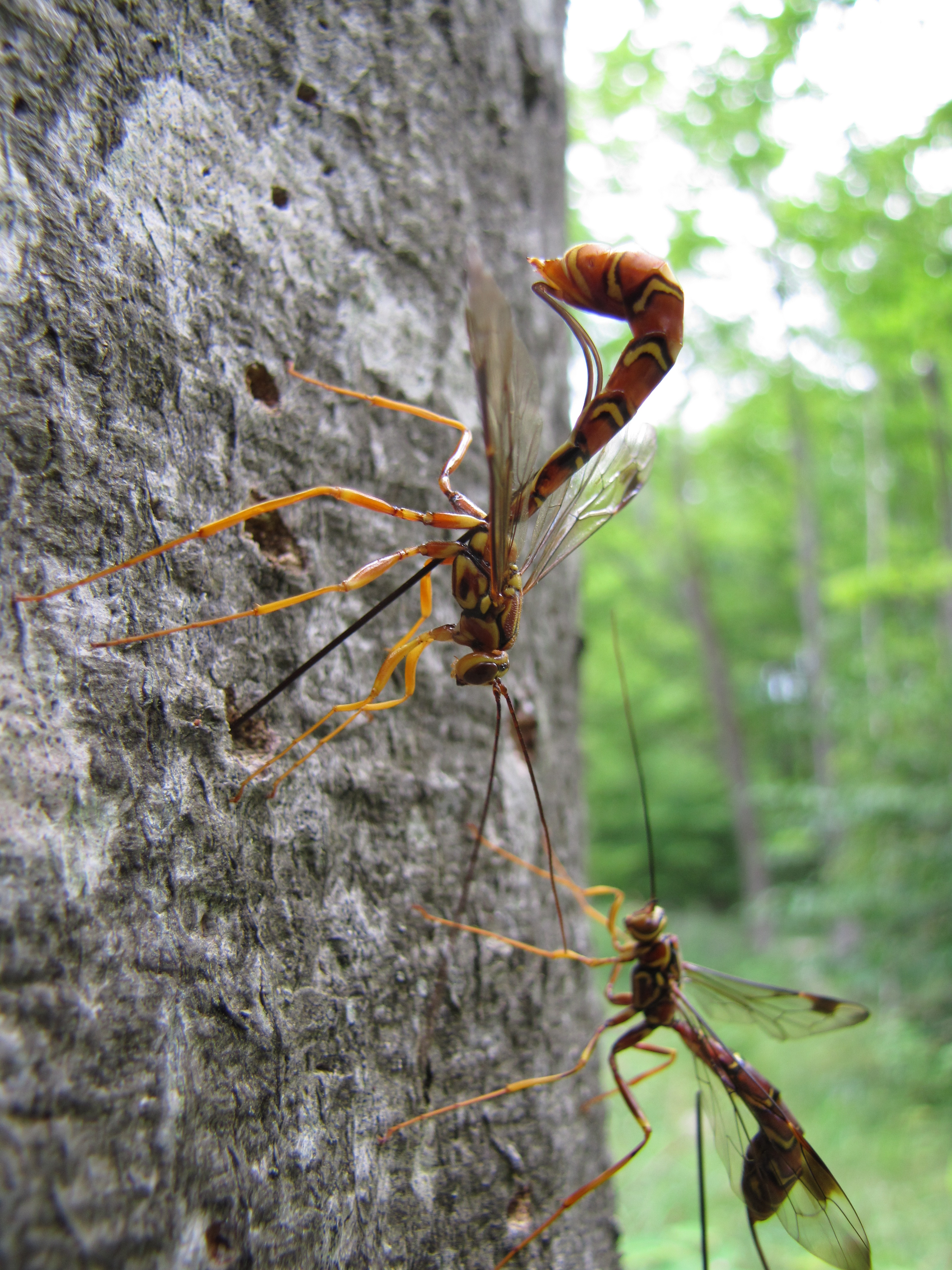
- Pair of females, with individual at left ovipositing

Scientific classification
- Kingdom: Animalia
- Phylum: Arthropoda
- Class: Insecta
- Order: Hymenoptera
- Family: Ichneumonidae
- Subfamily: Rhyssinae
- Genus: Megarhyssa
- Species: M. macrurus

Binomial name
- Megarhyssa macrurus (Linnaeus, 1771)

= Megarhyssa macrurus =

Species of wasp

Megarhyssa macrurus, also known as the long-tailed giant ichneumonid wasp or long-tailed giant ichneumon wasp, is a species of large ichneumon wasp. It is a parasitoid, notable for its extremely long ovipositor which it uses to deposit an egg into a tunnel in dead wood bored by its host, the larva of a similarly large species of horntail.

== Etymology ==
The specific epithet of macrurus is from the Greek words makrós (μακρός) meaning "long", and oùrá (οὐρά) meaning tail.

== Description ==
Megarhyssa macrurus has a reddish-brown body of up to 2 inches (51 mm) long. It has black and yellow-orange stripes. Its wings are transparent and the body elongated. The body and ovipositor together can be more than 5 inches (130 mm) long in the female. Males are smaller and have no ovipositor.

=== The ovipositor ===
The ovipositor looks like a single filament, but it comprises three filaments, the middle one of which is the actual ovipositor, which is capable of drilling into wood. This central filament also appears to be a single filament, but is made of two parts, with a cutting edge at the tip. The two parts interlock and slide against each other.

Although very thin, the ovipositor is a tube and the egg being laid moves down a minute channel in its center. The outer two filaments are sheaths which protect the ovipositor; they arc out to the sides during egg-laying.

== Distribution ==
M. macrurus is found across the eastern half of the United States, reaching into the extreme south of Canada near the Great Lakes.

== Behaviour ==
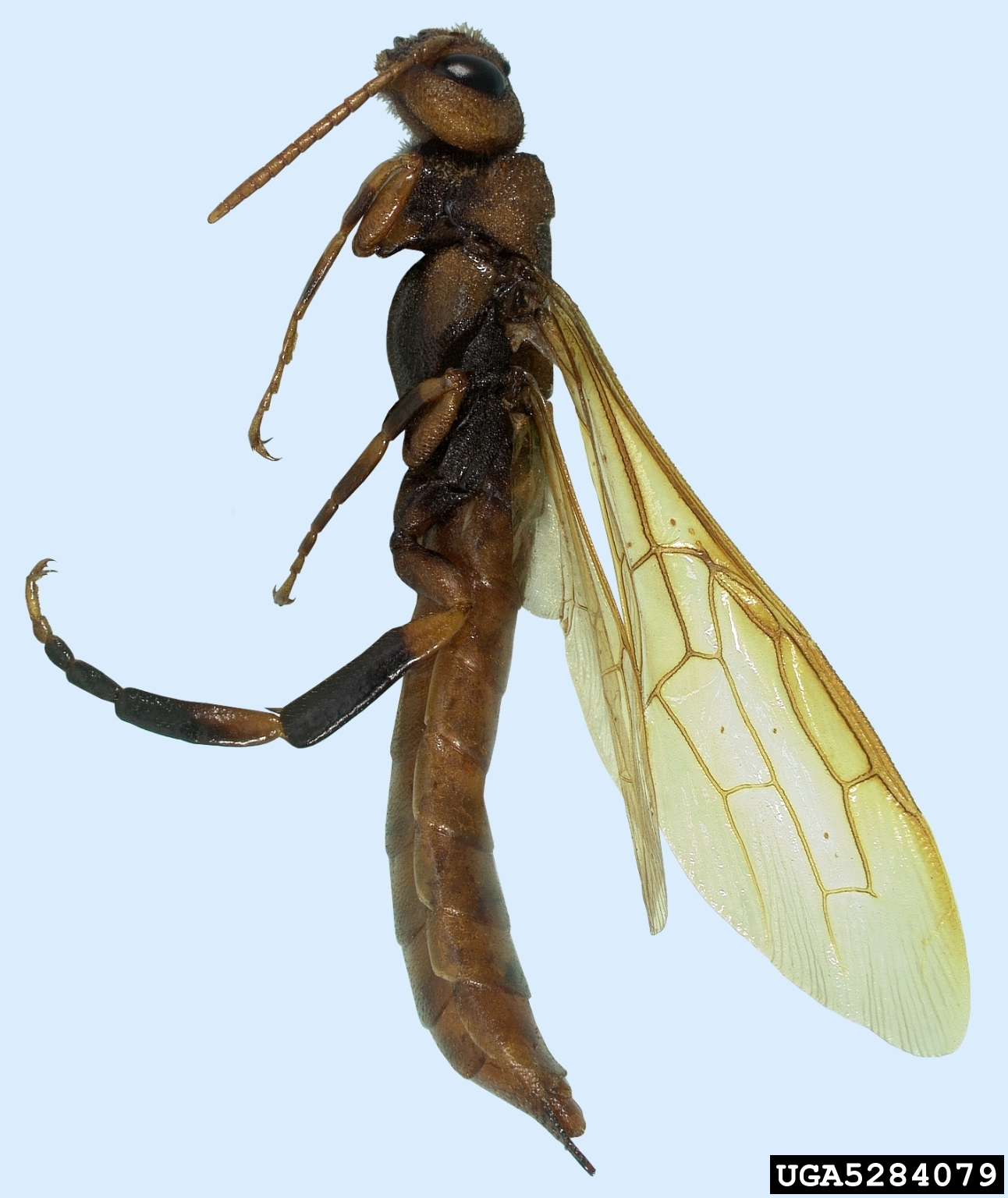
Pigeon tremex horntail (Tremex columba)

M. macrurus is harmless to humans; they are parasitoids on the larvae of the pigeon horntail (Tremex columba, Symphyta), which bore tunnels in decaying wood. Female Megarhyssa macrurus are able to detect these larvae through the bark; they paralyse them and lay their eggs on the living but paralysed larva; within a couple of weeks the Megarhyssa larvae will have consumed their host and pupate, emerging as an adult the following summer.

== Subspecies ==
Subspecies include:

- M. m. icterosticta Michener, 1939
- M. m. lunator (Fabricius, 1781) - considered a synonym of M. m. macrurus by Carlson (1979)
- M. m. macrurus (Linnaeus, 1771)
