= Cerrena cystidiata =

Scientific classification
- Domain: Eukaryota
- Kingdom: Fungi
- Division: Basidiomycota
- Class: Agaricomycetes
- Order: Polyporales
- Family: Polyporaceae
- Genus: Cerrena
- Species: C. cystidiata

Binomial name
- Cerrena cystidiata Rajchenberg & Meijer

Species of fungus

Cerrena cystidiata is a species of polypore in the genus Cerrena.
