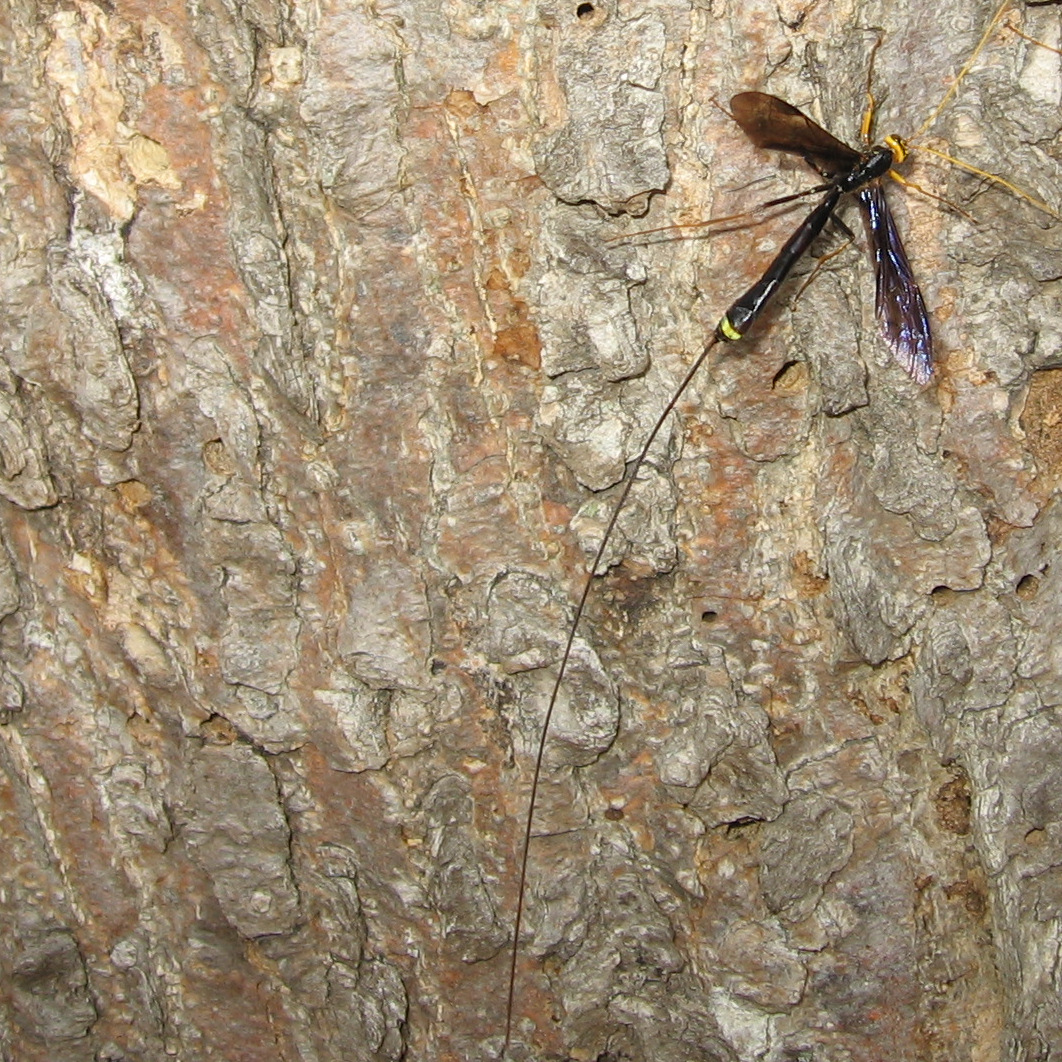
- Megarhyssa atrata female

Scientific classification
- Domain: Eukaryota
- Kingdom: Animalia
- Phylum: Arthropoda
- Class: Insecta
- Order: Hymenoptera
- Family: Ichneumonidae
- Subfamily: Rhyssinae
- Genus: Megarhyssa
- Species: M. atrata

Binomial name
- Megarhyssa atrata (Fabricius, 1781)

Synonyms
- Ichneumon atratus Fabricius, 1781

= Megarhyssa atrata =

Species of wasp

Megarhyssa atrata, also known as the black giant ichneumonid wasp, is a species of large ichneumon wasp. It is known from North America, where it is found from Quebec, Michigan, Ohio, Connecticut, and North and South Carolina to Florida.

Adults are on wing from May to July.

== Behavior ==
The larvae are parasitoids of the larvae of the woodwasp Tremex columba in dead deciduous trees.

Female M. atrata burrow into wood with their ovipositor while secreting a substance that breaks down the wood.
