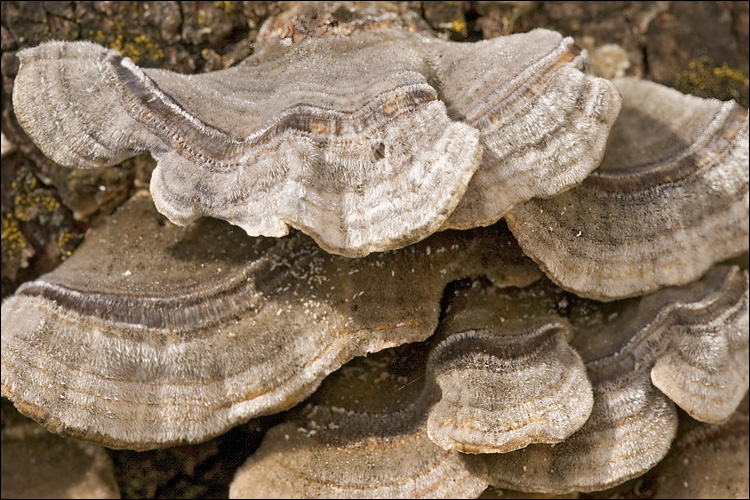
- Cerrena unicolor

Scientific classification
- Domain: Eukaryota
- Kingdom: Fungi
- Division: Basidiomycota
- Class: Agaricomycetes
- Order: Polyporales
- Family: Polyporaceae
- Genus: Cerrena; Gray, 1821

Type species
- Cerrena cinerea (Pers.) Gray, 1821

Species
- C. albocinnamomea C. aurantiopora C. cystidiata C. drummondii C. sclerodepsis C. unicolor C. zonata

Synonyms
- Sistotrema Pers. (1794); Phyllodontia P.Karst. (1883); Bulliardia Lázaro Ibiza (1916)

= Cerrena =

Genus of fungi

Cerrena is a genus of poroid fungi in the family Polyporaceae. The genus was circumscribed by Samuel Frederick Gray in 1821. Gray's type species, Cerrena cinerea, is now known as C. unicolor.

== Species ==
As of April 2014, Index Fungorum accepts seven species of Cerrena:

- Cerrena albocinnamomea (Y.C.Dai & Niemelä) H.S.Yuan (2013) – China
- Cerrena aurantiopora J.S.Lee & Y.W.Lim (2010) – Korea
- Cerrena cystidiata Rajchenb. & De Meijer (1990) – Brazil
- Cerrena drummondii (Klotzsch) Zmitr. (2001)
- Cerrena sclerodepsis (Berk.) Ryvarden (1976)
- Cerrena unicolor (Bull.) Murrill (1903) – widespread
- Cerrena zonata (Berk.) H.S.Yuan (2013)
