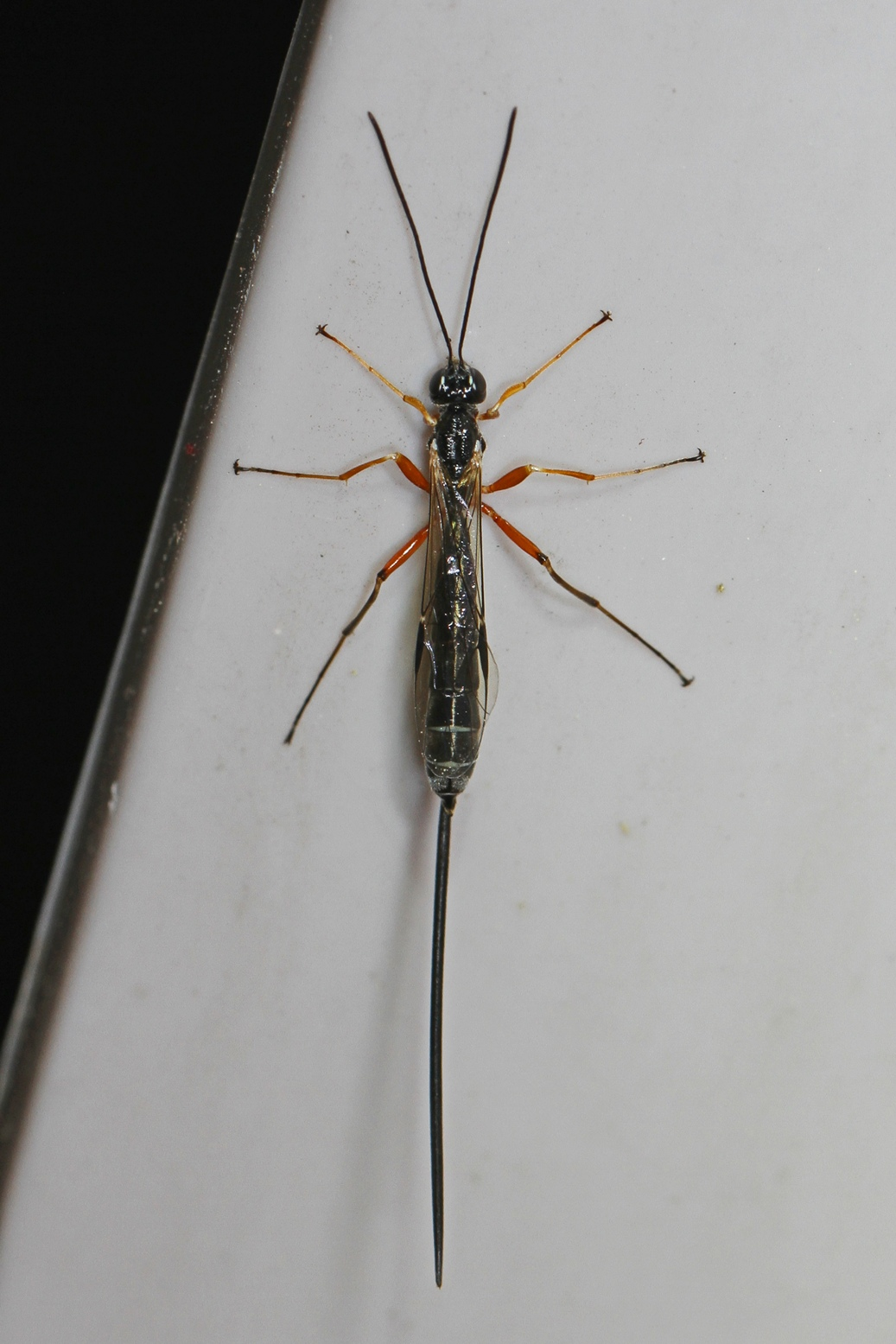
- Rhyssella nitida

Scientific classification
- Domain: Eukaryota
- Kingdom: Animalia
- Phylum: Arthropoda
- Class: Insecta
- Order: Hymenoptera
- Family: Ichneumonidae
- Subfamily: Rhyssinae
- Genus: Rhyssella; Rohwer, 1920

= Rhyssella =

Genus of wasps

Rhyssella is a genus of ichneumon wasps in the family Ichneumonidae. There are about 10 described species in Rhyssella.

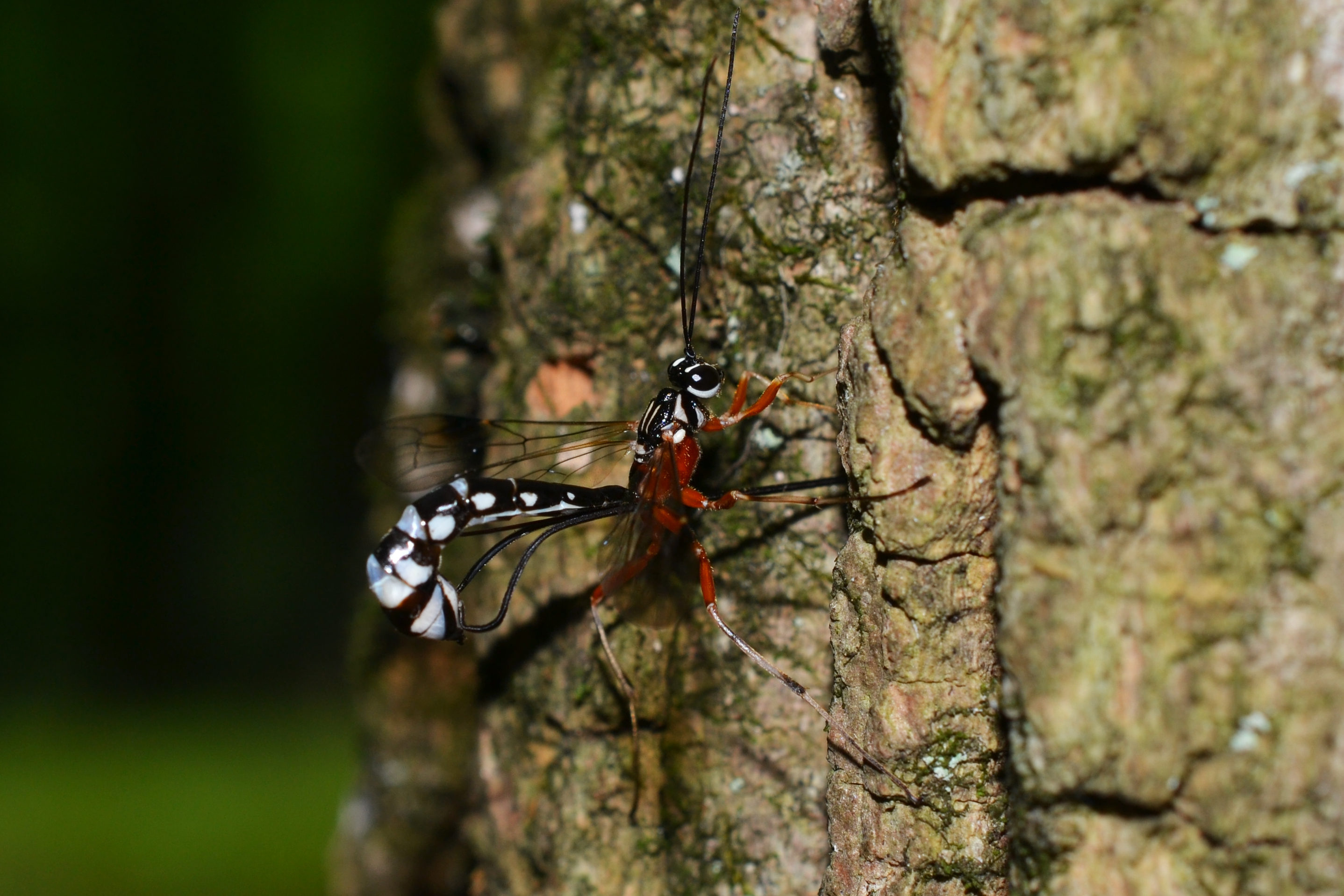
Rhyssella humida

== Species ==
These 10 species belong to the genus Rhyssella:

- Rhyssella approximator (Fabricius, 1793)^{c g}
- Rhyssella brevivaginata Wang & Hu, 1992^{c g}
- Rhyssella furanna (Matsumura, 1912)^{c g}
- Rhyssella humida (Say, 1835)^{c g b}
- Rhyssella jilinensis Wang & Hu, 1992^{c g}
- Rhyssella nitida (Cresson, 1864)^{c g b}
- Rhyssella obliterata (Gravenhorst, 1829)^{c g}
- Rhyssella perfulva Porter, 2002^{c g}
- Rhyssella speciosa Wang & Hu, 1992^{c g}
- Rhyssella wenxianensis Hu & Yao, 1998^{c g}

Data sources: i = ITIS, c = Catalogue of Life, g = GBIF, b = Bugguide.net
