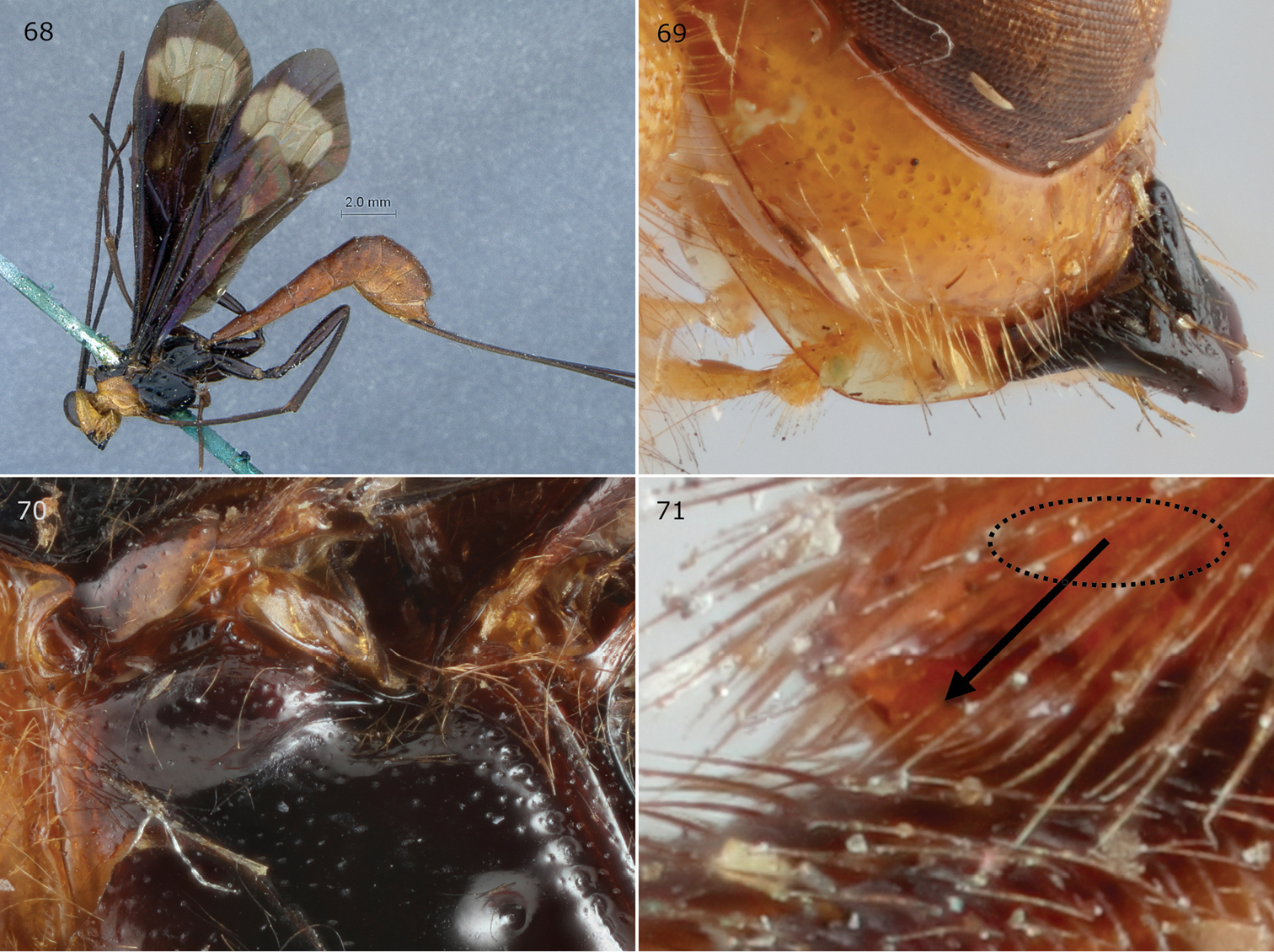
- 4 images of Epirhyssa villemantae

Scientific classification
- Kingdom: Animalia
- Phylum: Arthropoda
- Clade: Pancrustacea
- Class: Insecta
- Order: Hymenoptera
- Family: Ichneumonidae
- Subfamily: Rhyssinae
- Genus: Epirhyssa; Cresson, 1865

= Epirhyssa =

Genus of wasps

Epirhyssa is a genus of wasps belonging to the family Ichneumonidae. The highest concentration of the Epirhyssa species is found within the Oriental region.

The species is fairly small compared to other species, and usually takes on a tan color that can range to a sienna color. The small bug is long and skinny, and possesses wings that can range from 6.0 to 8.0 millimeters. Although typically spotted within the Tan or Sienna color range, certain members of the genus have an orange like color tone, that colors their wings as well. Similar in appearance to other members of the Ichneumonidae family, these insects are unique in appearance, boasting a curved abdomen, with several long tail-like protrusions coming out through a hole in the back of the abdomen.

Although current research on the Rhyssinae is very minimal, Since 2011, Robert Copeland and coordinators in the International Centre of Insect Physiology and Ecology in Nairobi have been running a trap collecting programme. With the hopes of being able to learn about the species in the future, the species still remains rather unknown as of late 2025.

The species of this genus are found across areas of Africa, including:

- Central African Republic, Cameroon, Democratic Republic of Congo, Madagascar, Nigeria, South Africa, Uganda.

Some other notable locations include:

- The Oriental region
- Western coast of South America
- North America
- Eastern Russia

Epirhyssa species have also been observed in:

- Oriental regions (50 Species)
- Neotropical regions (45 Species)
- Afrotropical regions (12 Species)

== Species ==
Species:

- Epirhyssa alternata Cresson, 1865
- Epirhyssa amaura Porter, 1978
- Epirhyssa amazonica Mocsary, 1905
- Epirhyssa anamikae Jonathan, 1974
- Epirhyssa annulicornis Cameron, 1899
- Epirhyssa araucaridae Porter, 1978
- Epirhyssa aspera Kamath & Gupta, 1972
- Epirhyssa atra Kamath & Gupta, 1972
- Epirhyssa atrata Kasparyan, 2007
- Epirhyssa braconoides Porter, 1978
- Epirhyssa brianfisheri Rousse & van Noort, 2014
- Epirhyssa baltazarae Kamath & Gupta, 1972
- Epirhyssa bifurcata Baltazar, 1972
- Epirhyssa bimaculata Cameron, 1903
- Epirhyssa binaria Kamath & Gupta, 1972
- Epirhyssa binghami Kamath & Gupta, 1972
- Epirhyssa biroi Moscary, 1905
- Epirhyssa braconoides Porter, 1978
- Epirhyssa carinifrons Cameron, 1899
- Epirhyssa celaena Porter, 1975
- Epirhyssa chlora Porter, 1978
- Epirhyssa chrysitis Porter, 1975
- Epirhyssa cincta Baltazar, 1961
- Epirhyssa cochabambae Porter, 1978
- Epirhyssa clavuta Provancher, 1886
- Epirhyssa confracta Kamath & Gupta, 1972
- Epirhyssa copelandi Varga, 2020
- Epirhyssa corralesi Gauld 1991
- Epirhyssa corpucella Wang, 1955
- Epirhyssa crevieri Provancher, 1881
- Epirhyssa cruciata Cameron, 1907
- Epirhyssa curtisi Gauld, 1991
- Epirhyssa curvimaculata Cameron, 1907
- Epirhyssa daedala Porter, 1978
- Epirhyssa diatropis Porter, 1978
- Epirhyssa elegana Wang, 1997
- Epirhyssa eucnemis Porter, 1978
- Epirhyssa facitorosa Baltizar, 1961
- Epirhyssa ferruginea Baltzar, 1961
- Epirhyssa flavipes Sonan, 1933
- Epirhyssa flavobalteata Cameron, 1899
- Epirhussa flavopicta Smith, 1858
- Epirhyssa frohbergi Gauld, 1991
- Epirhyssa fulva Porter, 1978
- Epirhyssa gavinbroadi Rousse & van Noort, 2014
- Epirhyssa ghesquierei Seyrig, 1937
- Epirhyssa hyblaena Sonan, 1933
- Epirhyssa iiapensis Porter, 1978
- Epirhyssa insolita Baltazar, 1962
- Epirhyssa isthmia Porter, 1978
- Epirhyssa japonica Cameron, 1886
- Epirhyssa johanna Hopkins, 2019
- Epirhyssa kurilensis Kasparyan, 2007
- Epirhyssa latimandibularis Hu & Wang, 1994
- Epirhyssa leonoreae Zuñiga & Hanson, 2024
- Epirhyssa lepta Kamath & Gupta, 1972
- Epirhyssa leroyi Benoit, 1951
- Epirhyssa leuceres Porter 1978
- Epirhyssa lewisi Zuñiga & Hanson, 2024
- Epirhyssa lineatiscutis Unknown person, 1907
- Epirhyssa lutea Porter, 1978
- Epirhyssa lygra Porter, 1978
- Epirhyssa maculiceps Cameron 1905
- Epirhyssa maculicornis Cameron, 1894
- Epirhyssa malayana Kamath & Gupta, 1972
- Epirhyssa masoni Kamath & Gupta, 1972
- Epirhyssa maynei Benoit, 1952
- Epirhyssa melampyge Porter, 1978
- Epirhyssa melitos Porter, 1978
- Epirhyssa mexicana Cresson, 1894
- Epirhyssa migratoria Seyrig, 1932
- Epirhyssa missionis Porter, 1975
- Epirhyssa moiwana Matsumura, 1912
- Epirhyssa mülleriVoll, unknown date
- Epirhyssa nigerrinaMorley, 1913
- Epirhyssa nigri Uchida, 1928
- Epirhyssa nigristigma Uchida, 1928
- Epirhyssa nigrithorax Graf & Kumagai, 2004
- Epirhyssa nigrobalteata Cameron, 1903
- Epirhyssa nitobei Uchida, 1928
- Epirhyssa oaxaca Porter, 1978
- Epirhyssa oceanica Unknown
- Epirhyssa ornatipes Cameron, 1905
- Epirhyssa osaensis Gauld & Ward, 1997
- Epirhyssa overlaeti Seyrig, 1937
- Epirhyssa pacheia Porter, 1978
- Epirhyssa pertenuis Porter, 1978
- Epirhyssa perspicua Kamath & Gupta, 1972
- Epirhyssa petiolaris Kamath & Gupta, 1972
- Epirhyssa peruana Enderlein, 1919
- Epirhyssa phoenix Porter, 1975
- Epirhyssa porteri Gauld, 1991
- Epirhyssa praecinta Porter, 1978
- Epirhyssa prolasia Porter, 1978
- Epirhyssa pyrrha Porter, 1978
- Epirhyssa quagga Hopkins, 2019
- Epirhyssa quirosi Gauld, 1991
- Epirhyssa raptor Tosquinet, 1903
- Epirhyssa rotunda Baltazar 1961
- Epirhyssa sapporensis Uchida, 1928
- Epirhyssa sarawakensis Kamath & Gupta, 1972
- Epirhyssa sauteri Kamath & Gupta, 1972
- Epirhyssa shaka Rousse & van Noort, 2014
- Epirhyssa silvatica Kamath & Gupta, 1972
- Epirhyssa similis Baltazar, 1961
- Epirhyssa sinuata Baltazar, 1961
- Epirhyssa speciosa Cresson, 1865
- Epirhyssa spiloptera Cameron, 1905
- Epirhyssa striata Khairiza & Idris, 2006
- Epirhyssa tandoni Jonathan, 1974
- Epirhyssa theloides Porter, 1978
- Epirhyssa tombeaodiba Rousse & van Noort, 2014
- Epirhyssa tonkinensis Moscary, 1905
- Epirhyssa tristis Kriechbaumer, 1890
- Epirhyssa tuberculata Cameron, unknown date
- Epirhyssa tylota Porter, 1975
- Epirhyssa uelensis Benoit, 1951
- Epirhyssa villemantae Rousse & van Noort, 2014
- Epirhyssa valida Kamath & Gupta, 1972
- Epirhyssa vulgaris Baltazar, 1961
- Epirhyssa wisei Porter, 1978
- Epirhyssa walkleyae Baltazar, 1961
- Epirhyssa xanthostigma Porter, 1978
- Epirhyssa xoutha Porter, 1978
- Epirhyssa zaphyma Porter, 1978
- Epirhyssa zurquiae Gauld & Ward, 1997
