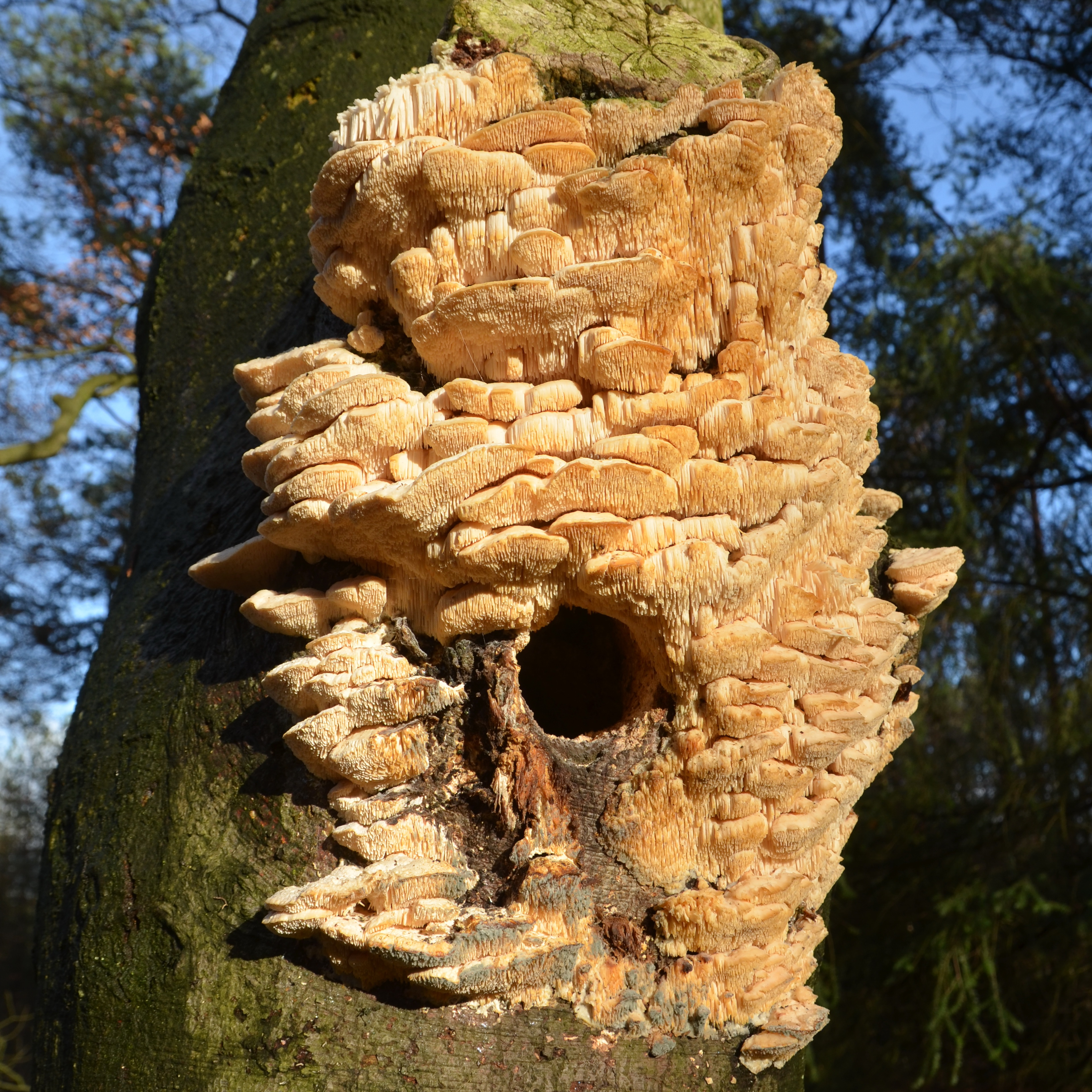

Scientific classification
- Domain: Eukaryota
- Kingdom: Fungi
- Division: Basidiomycota
- Class: Agaricomycetes
- Order: Polyporales
- Family: Polyporaceae
- Genus: Irpiciporus
- Species: I. pachyodon

Binomial name
- Irpiciporus pachyodon (Pers.) Kotl. & Pouzar, 1965

= Irpiciporus pachyodon =

Species of fungus

Irpiciporus pachyodon is a species of fungus belonging to the family Polyporaceae.

It has cosmopolitan distribution.

Synonym:

- Spongipellis pachyodon
