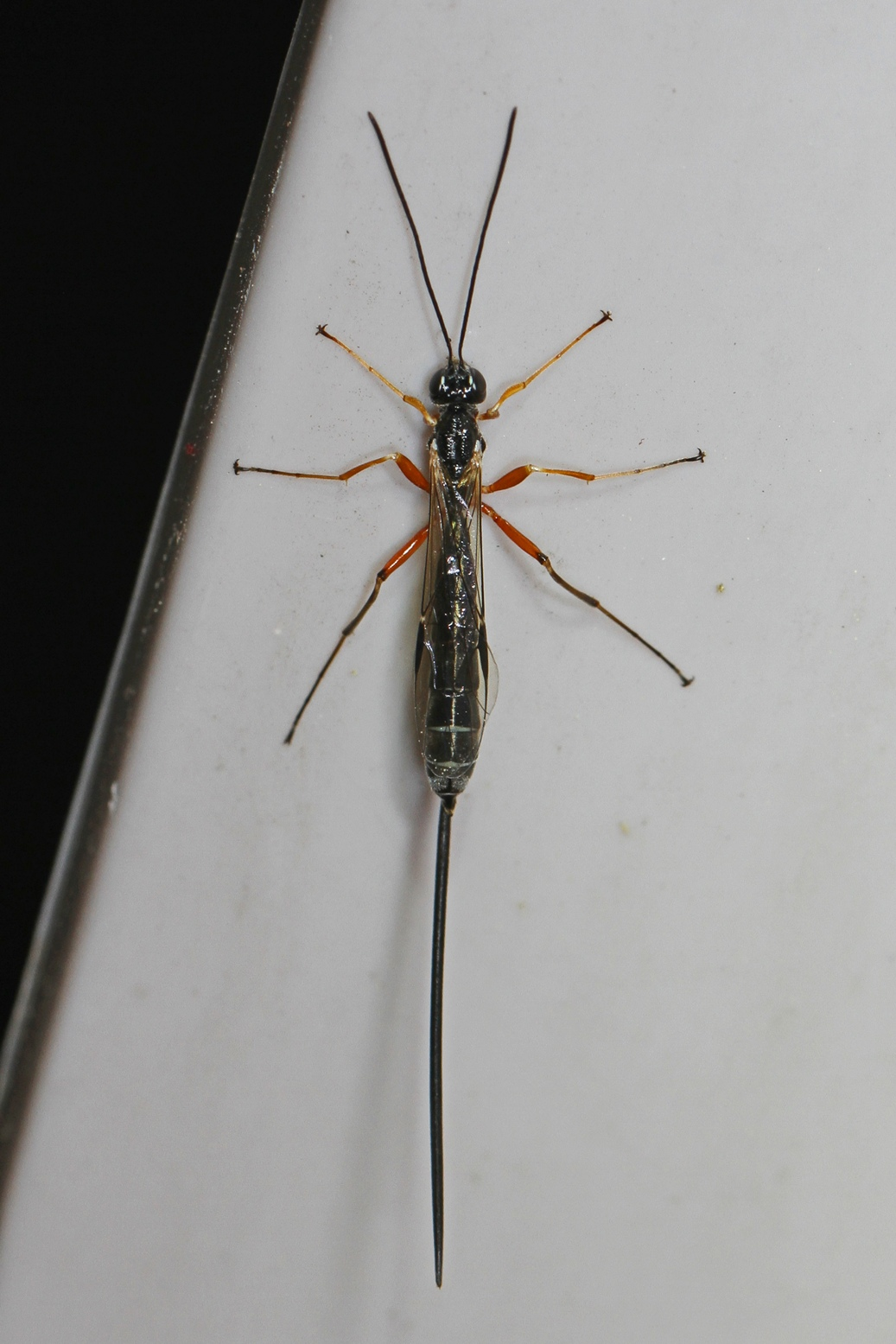

Scientific classification
- Kingdom: Animalia
- Phylum: Arthropoda
- Class: Insecta
- Order: Hymenoptera
- Family: Ichneumonidae
- Genus: Rhyssella
- Species: R. nitida

Binomial name
- Rhyssella nitida (Cresson, 1864)

= Rhyssella nitida =

Species of wasp

Rhyssella nitida is a species of ichneumon wasp in the family Ichneumonidae.

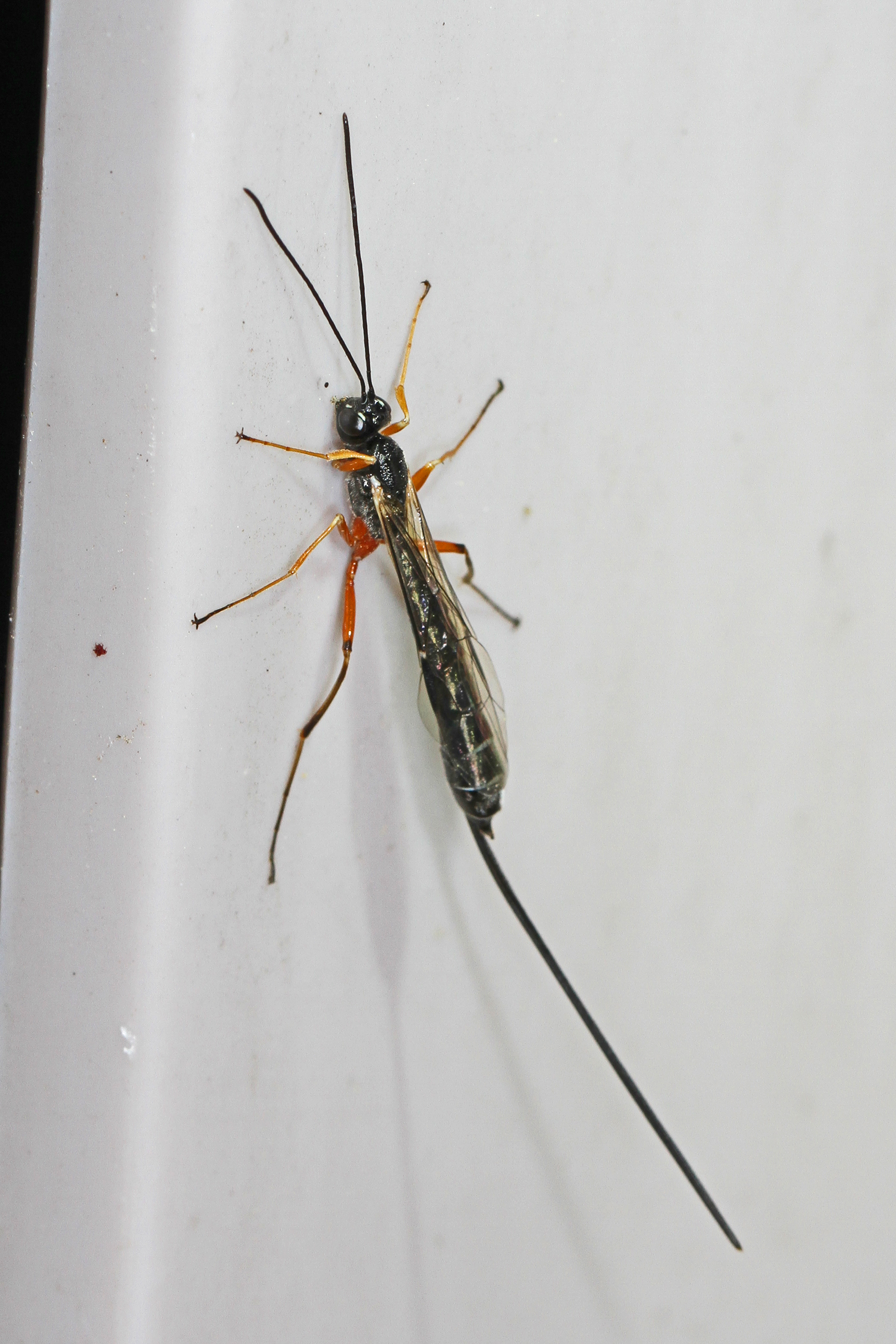
