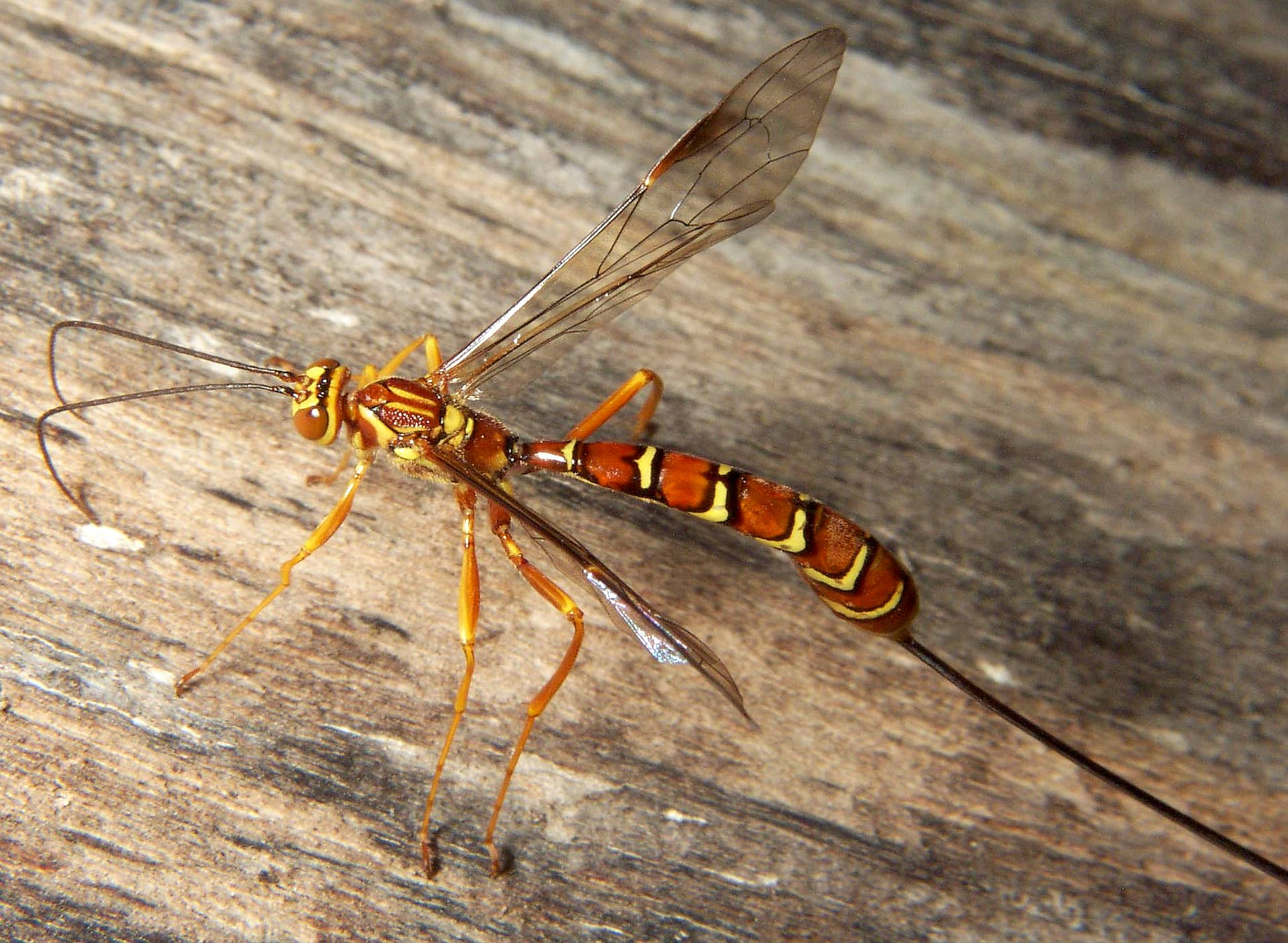
- Female Megarhyssa greenei

Scientific classification
- Kingdom: Animalia
- Phylum: Arthropoda
- Clade: Pancrustacea
- Class: Insecta
- Order: Hymenoptera
- Family: Ichneumonidae
- Subfamily: Rhyssinae
- Genus: Megarhyssa; Ashmead, 1900

Synonyms
- Thalessa Holmgren, 1859 (Preocc.); Megalorhyssa Schulz, 1906; Eurhyssa Derksen, 1941

= Megarhyssa =

Genus of wasps

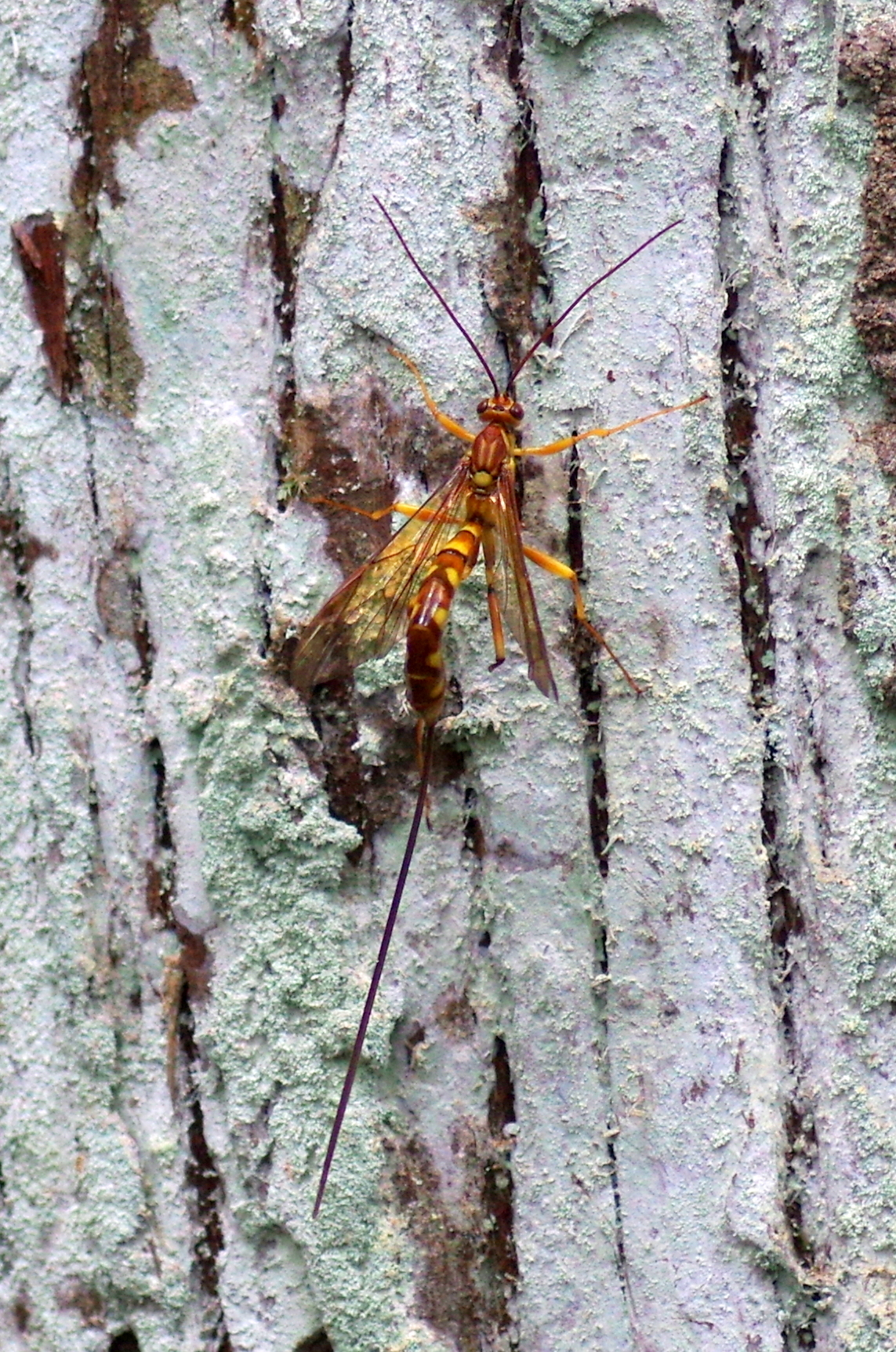
Female Megarhyssa praecellens in China

Megarhyssa, also known as giant ichneumonid wasps, giant ichneumons, or stump stabbers, is a genus of large ichneumon wasps, with some species known for having the longest ovipositors of any insects. They are idiobiont ectoparasitoids of the larvae of wood-boring horntail wasps. The ovipositor can be mistaken for a large stinger. This is a genus of holometabolous insects within subfamily Rhyssinae that includes 37 species and belongs to Ichneumonidae, the family of wasps with the highest biodiversity in the world.

== Geographical range and habitat ==
Megarhyssa species occur all over the world. There are only four Megarhyssa species known to inhabit the Nearctic region inhabiting decidious forests. They are widespread across the United States, and Canada. The species M. macrurus, M. atrata, and M. greenei are known to be sympatric in the northeastern United States. M. macrurus is known to inhabit further southern regions as well, reaching Mexico. M. nortoni has been introduced to South Africa, Australia, and New Zealand as a biological control agent.

== Description and identification ==
Megarhyssa male adults reach body lengths going from 2.3 to 3.8 cm (0.9 to 1.6 inches), while female adults can measure from 3.5 to 7.5 cm (1.5 to 3 inches). Both sexes can be distinguished because females have an extremely slender, and long organ to lay eggs called the ovipositor. This organ is much longer than the body itself, its length can range from 5 to 10 cm (2 to 4 inches). Megarhyssa adults show variation in coloration, including dark brown, bluish black, reddish brown and/or bright yellow.

=== Species of the United States and Canada ===
The species M. atrata (Fabricius) shows a bright yellow head, and an almost completely black body. The wings are black as well. It can be easily distinguished from the species M. macrurus, M. greenei, and M. nortoni, which show yellow and brown striped color patterns that resemble one another, requiring identification by specialists.

== Ecology ==
The family Ichneumonidae is composed of parasitoid wasps. The adults do not often feed. When they do so, they feed on water droplets found on leaves that often contain nectar. The larvae feed on flesh from hosts the adults locate. In the Nearcctic, Palearctic, and Australian regions, some Megarhyssa species such as M. emarginatoria, M. jezoensis, and M. nortoni are parasitoids of Siricidae. The species M. atrata, M. macrurus, and M. greenei show diurnal activity and have undergone allopatric speciation and attack the larvae of one species of woodwasp: Tremex columba. These three species are capable of coexisting with each other because their ovipositors have different lengths. As a result, they find their host at different depths within trees, or logs. The distance the larva is within the trunk is equal to the length of the ovipositor of each species. The ovipositor of M. atrata is known to puncture up to 14 cm inside the wood, and such length makes this wasp functionally the longest species in the order Hymenoptera (if ovipositor is included).

== Reproduction ==
=== Reproductive cycle ===
The reproductive cycle of Megarhyssa begins with the female locating a larva of Tremex columba inside the bark of a tree. She lays an egg close by or on the larva, the Megarhyssa larva devours it, it pupates under the bark, and emerges the following year as an adult. Males often emerge first. The species M. atrata, M. macrurus, and M. greenei share their territory, and habitat, showing the same behavior: males emerge, and remain close by the trees where more wasps from these species emerge.

Megarhyssa males often try to squeeze inside the holes of the bark of trees even before females emerge because preemergence mating is easier to carry out than postemergence mating. In females the genital opening is oriented anteriorly; in males, posteriorly. In preemergence mating, the male inserts his abdomen inside the hole and inside the genital opening of the female. In postemergence mating, the male must be on the abdomen of the female, and bend his abdomen all around it to reach her genitalia properly. Afterward, females look for a spot in the same area where the host they need to feed their larvae is found. Once they locate a host, females must pierce the bark of trees using the ovipositor to reach the larva. The exact movements of the ovipositor remain unclear, although it is known females carry out a series of movements with it: she puts the ovipositor as vertically as possible relative to the wood. The intersegmentary segments must be fully unfolded and coupled to the rotation of the last abdominal segment. Then, the stylus can start penetrating the wood. The wasps always follow a very straight line without deviating to reach the chamber where the larva lies.

=== Mate choice and competition ===
Megarhyssa males have been known to detect other individuals to emerge before the emergence happened. Males of the three species aggregate around the hole to find out the sex of the individual. Males do so hearing how the females bite, and chew through the wood to find their way out. If the individual is a male, many males often show little interest, and fly away. In case it is a female, males try to mate with her as soon as possible. The sensory organs that allow the wasps to detect their mates, and hosts is close to the antennae.

=== Evolution of flight ===
The movement that flight makes possible for parasitoids is crucial to reproduce, so it is related directly with fitness. In M. nortoni, it is known females perform longer single flights and overall longer flights than males. It is thought this is because females are the individuals that reach new habitats, redistribute the progeny, and locate hosts. These activities require longer-range flights. Males of M. nortoni spend most of their time in aggregations around sites from which females are about to emerge. Even if males are disturbed and fly away from the site, they return and regroup around the same point of the tree. They have been known to be flying around a specific tree and patrolling it over time. Such features lead to the evolution of shorter-range flights.

== Species ==
Species within the genus:

- Megarhyssa arisana
- Megarhyssa atomistica
- Megarhyssa atrata
- Megarhyssa aurantia
- Megarhyssa babaulti
- Megarhyssa belulliflava
- Megarhyssa bicolor
- Megarhyssa bonbonsana
- Megarhyssa cultrimacularis
- Megarhyssa fulvipennis
- Megarhyssa gloriosa
- Megarhyssa greenei
- Megarhyssa hainanensis
- Megarhyssa indica
- Megarhyssa insulana
- Megarhyssa jezoensis
- Megarhyssa laniaria
- Megarhyssa lenticula
- Megarhyssa longitubula
- Megarhyssa macrurus
- Megarhyssa middenensis
- Megarhyssa mirabilis
- Megarhyssa nortoni
- Megarhyssa obtusa
- Megarhyssa perlata
- Megarhyssa praecellens
- Megarhyssa recava
- Megarhyssa rixator
- Megarhyssa rotundamacula
- Megarhyssa strimacula
- Megarhyssa superba
- Megarhyssa taiwana
- Megarhyssa vagatoria
- Megarhyssa verae
- Megarhyssa weixiensis
- Megarhyssa wugongensis
