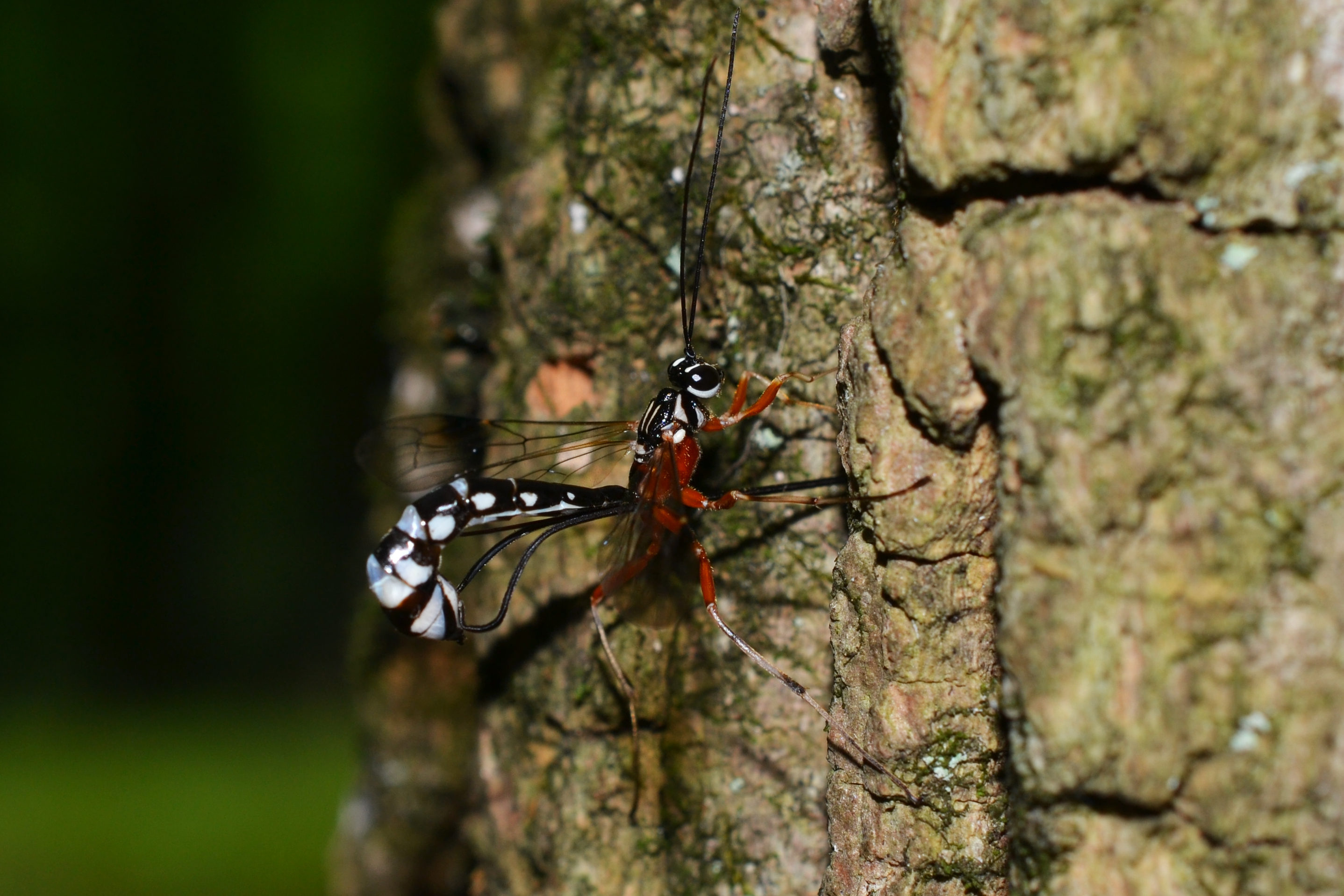

Scientific classification
- Kingdom: Animalia
- Phylum: Arthropoda
- Class: Insecta
- Order: Hymenoptera
- Family: Ichneumonidae
- Genus: Rhyssella
- Species: R. humida

Binomial name
- Rhyssella humida (Say, 1835)

= Rhyssella humida =

Species of wasp

Rhyssella humida is a species of ichneumon wasp in the family Ichneumonidae.
