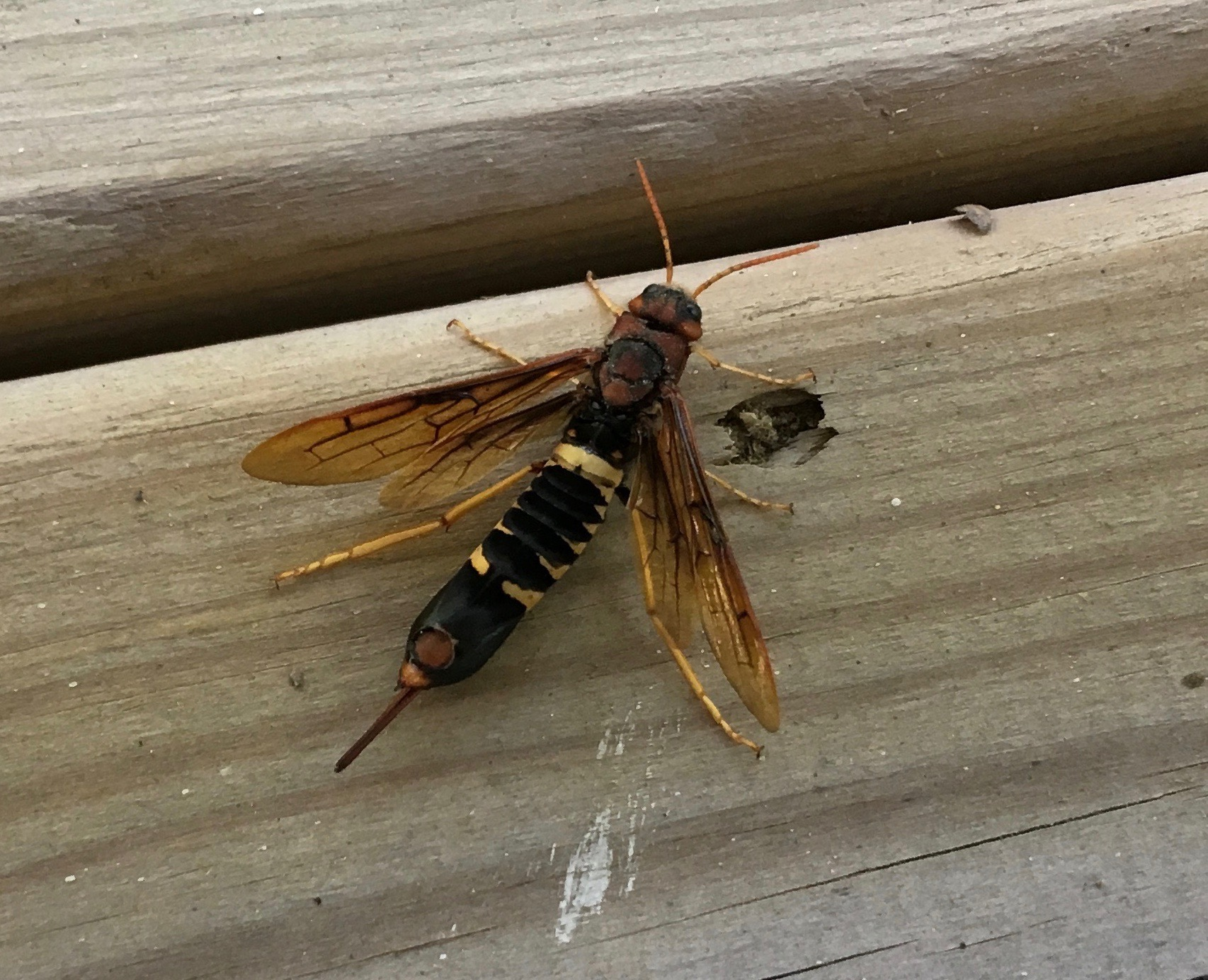
- Tremex columba female

Scientific classification
- Kingdom: Animalia
- Phylum: Arthropoda
- Class: Insecta
- Order: Hymenoptera
- Family: Siricidae
- Genus: Tremex
- Species: T. columba

Binomial name
- Tremex columba (Linnaeus, 1763)

= Tremex columba =

Pigeon tremex

Species of sawfly

Tremex columba, also known as the pigeon tremex or pigeon horntail, is a species of horntail that is native to eastern and western North America.

== Appearance and behavior ==
The females are larger than the males, with females growing to 25-30mm in length, and males about 20-25mm. The species can vary in coloration from light brown to dark reddish brown, and sports yellow and black stripes along the abdomen. Both males and females have long projections protruding from their rear, with the females possessing an additional projection in the form of an ovipositor.

The females of the species use their ovipositor to deposit their eggs into dead and dying deciduous trees such as beech, elm, maple, and oak, which the larvae burrow inside of and feed upon. They usually deposit between two and seven eggs into the tree. The female will die after this process, and carcasses can sometimes be seen stuck to the bark of host trees.

== Interaction with other species ==
Megarhyssa macrurus, M. greenei, and M. atrata are the natural predators of this species. The female Megarhyssa seeks out the larvae within the tunnels bored by this species. It then lays an egg next to the larva and then injects a venom to paralyze it. Another parasitoid of Tremex columba is Ibalia anceps.

Because the species prefers dead or decaying trees, they usually pose little threat to vegetation as a pest, though they do sometimes select healthy trees, and via the ovipositor the species can infect the host tree with Cerrena unicolor, a fungus that can rot the trees.

The species is not considered harmful to humans, and does not sting or bite.
