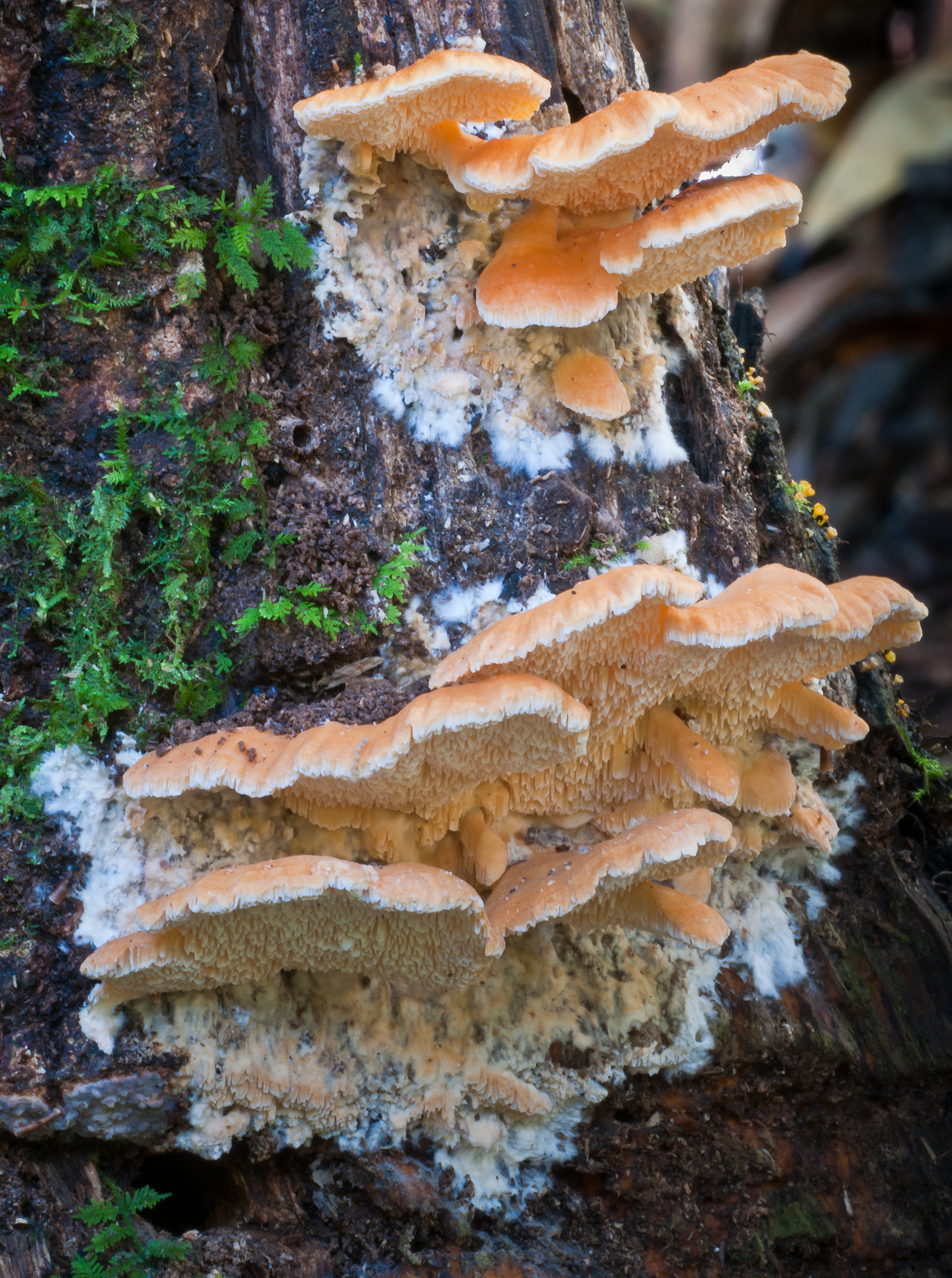

Scientific classification
- Domain: Eukaryota
- Kingdom: Fungi
- Division: Basidiomycota
- Class: Agaricomycetes
- Order: Polyporales
- Family: Polyporaceae
- Genus: Cerrena
- Species: C. zonata

Binomial name
- Cerrena zonata (Berk.) H.S.Yuan (2014)

Synonyms
- Irpex zonatus Berk. (1854); Xylodon zonatus (Berk.) Kuntze (1898); Antrodiella zonata (Berk.) Ryvarden (1992); Irpex brevis Berk. (1855); Xylodon brevis (Berk.) Kuntze (1898); Irpex decurrens Berk. ex Cooke (1891); Xylodon decurrens (Berk. ex Cooke) Kuntze (1898); Hydnum decurrens Berk. (1891); Irpiciporus japonicus Murrill (1909); Irpex japonicus (Murrill) Sacc. & Trotter (1912); Polyporus japonicus (Murrill) Teng (1936); Irpex cingulatus Lloyd (1918)

= Cerrena zonata =

Species of fungus

Cerrena zonata is a species of poroid fungus in the genus Cerrena (Family: Polyporaceae).

== Taxonomy ==
The fungus was first described scientifically by Miles Joseph Berkeley in 1854 as Irpex zonatus. In 1992, Leif Ryvarden moved it to Antrodiella, a wastebasket taxon containing morphologically similar species. It was transferred to the genus Cerrena in 2014.

== Habitat and distribution ==
Cerrena zonata is a white rot fungus that grows on dead hardwoods. In Asia, it has been recorded from India to Thailand, Vietnam, China, Far East Russia, and Japan. It is also in New Zealand, Australia, and Argentina.
