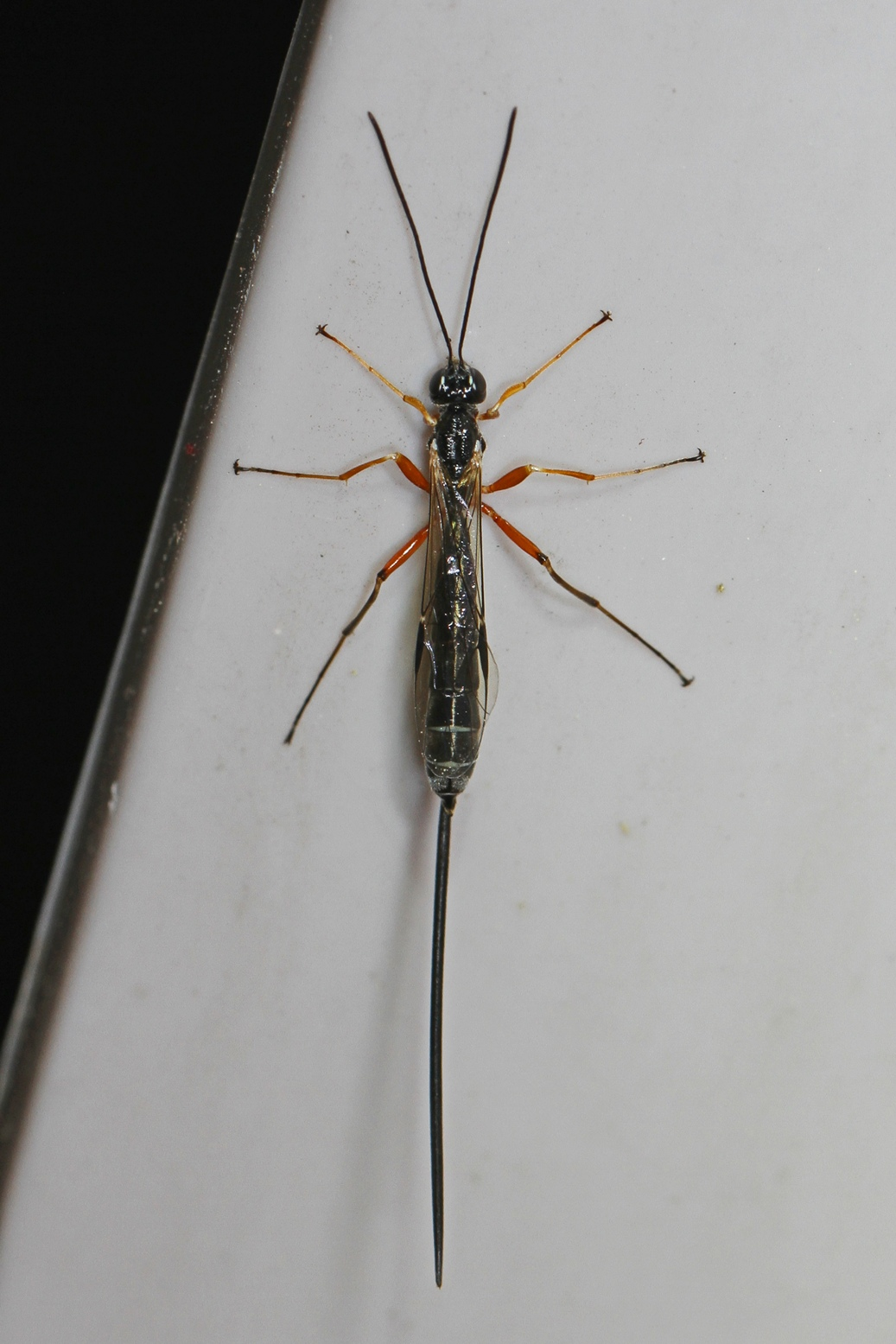
- Rhyssella nitida

Scientific classification
- Kingdom: Animalia
- Phylum: Arthropoda
- Clade: Pancrustacea
- Class: Insecta
- Order: Hymenoptera
- Family: Ichneumonidae
- Subfamily: Rhyssinae; Morley, 1913

= Rhyssinae =

Rhyssinae Temporal range: 47–0 Ma Eocene - Present

Subfamily of wasps

Rhyssinae is a subfamily of parasitoid wasps in the family Ichneumonidae. It contains eight genera and 259 described species, but there are likely many undiscovered species.

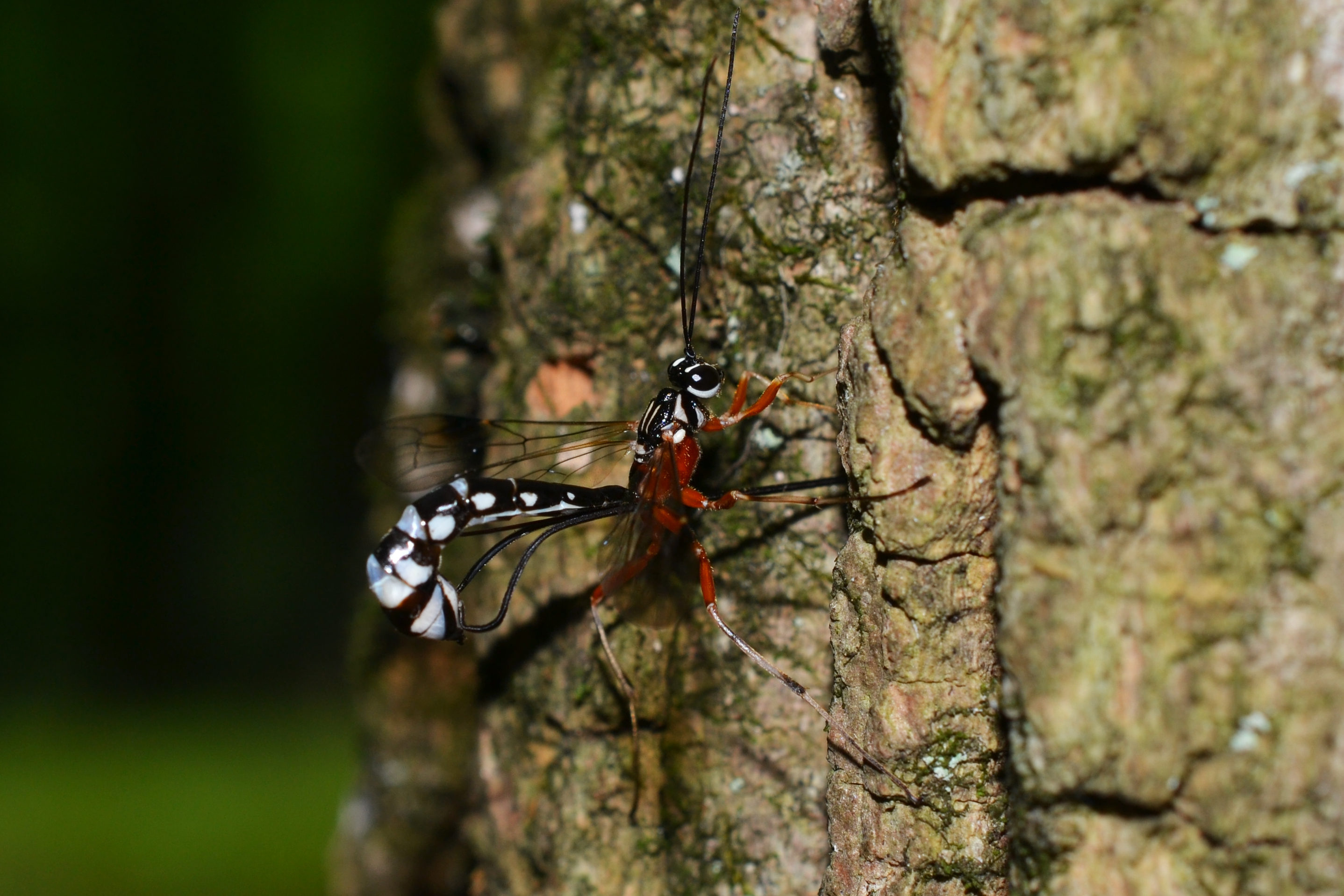
Rhyssella humida

All possess long ovipositors, which are used by females to bore into tree trunks to lay eggs on the larvae of horntails and wood-boring beetles.

Females in genus Megarhyssa show very long ovipositors, with the one of M. atrata reaching 14 cm in length.

== Fossil record ==
The oldest reliable discovery of the subfamily in fossil form was made in a German Messel pit (Eocene, about 47 Ma).

== Genera ==
The following genera belong to the subfamily Rhyssinae:

- Cyrtorhyssa Baltazar, 1961^{i c g}
- Epirhyssa Cresson, 1865^{i c g b}
- Lytarmes Cameron, 1899^{i c g}
- Megarhyssa Ashmead, 1900^{i c g b}
- Myllenyxis Baltazar, 1961^{i c g}
- Rhyssa Gravenhorst, 1829^{i c g b}
- Rhyssella Rohwer, 1920^{i c g b}
- Triancyra Baltazar, 1961^{i c g}

Data sources: i = ITIS, c = Catalogue of Life, g = GBIF, b = Bugguide.net
