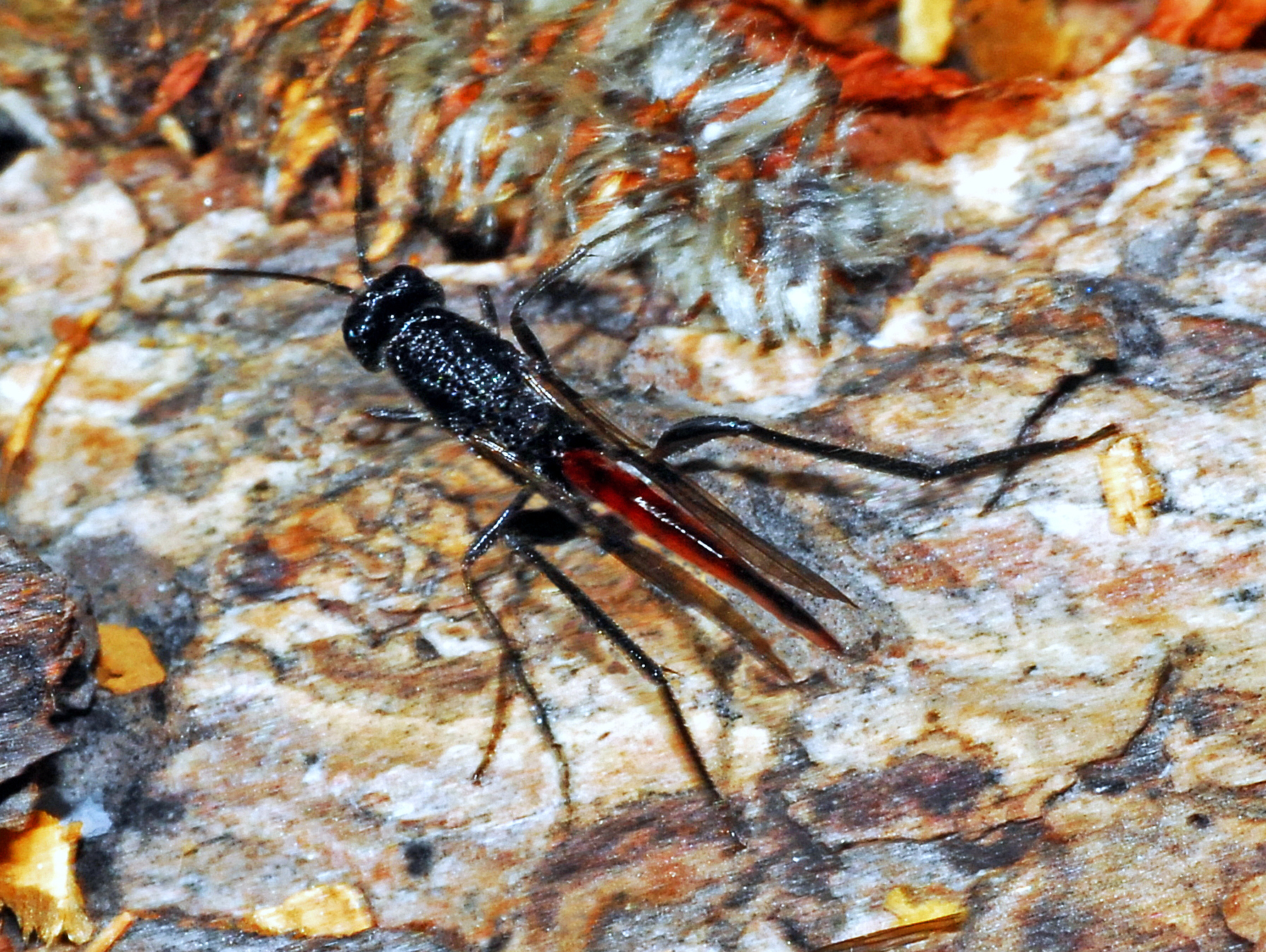
- Ibalia leucospoides

Scientific classification
- Kingdom: Animalia
- Phylum: Arthropoda
- Clade: Pancrustacea
- Class: Insecta
- Order: Hymenoptera
- Suborder: Apocrita
- Infraorder: Proctotrupomorpha
- Superfamily: Cynipoidea
- Family: Ibaliidae; Thomson, 1862

Genera
- Eileenella Fergusson; Heteribalia Sakagami; Ibalia Latreille; †Archaeibalia Liu & Engel

= Ibaliidae =

Family of wasps

The Ibaliidae are a small family of the hymenopteran superfamily Cynipoidea. Ibaliidae differ from most of the cynipoids by the larvae being parasitoids on other wasp larvae in the group Siricidae. The Ibaliidae comprise three extant genera of fairly large wasps, with a total of 20 species, and is a sister group to the rest of the cynipoids except the small subfamily Austrocynipidae.

== Description ==
Their large size is a typical and obvious characteristic in the family, with lengths up to 30 mm (1.2 in). The following distinct features are diagnostic characters, based on research by Ronquist and Liu and Nordlander.

=== Body ===
The genae are swollen and pronounced. The female antenna consists of 11 segments, while the male antenna consists of 13 segments. A large portion of the pronotum is well developed, called the dorsal pronotal area, with scutellar processes. The marginal cell of the forewing is elongated and thin. The gaster is long and pronouncedly compressed laterally. The seventh tergum is large in females. An apical tubular process is present on the second tarsomere of the hind leg. The metafemur is short, no longer than the metacoxa.

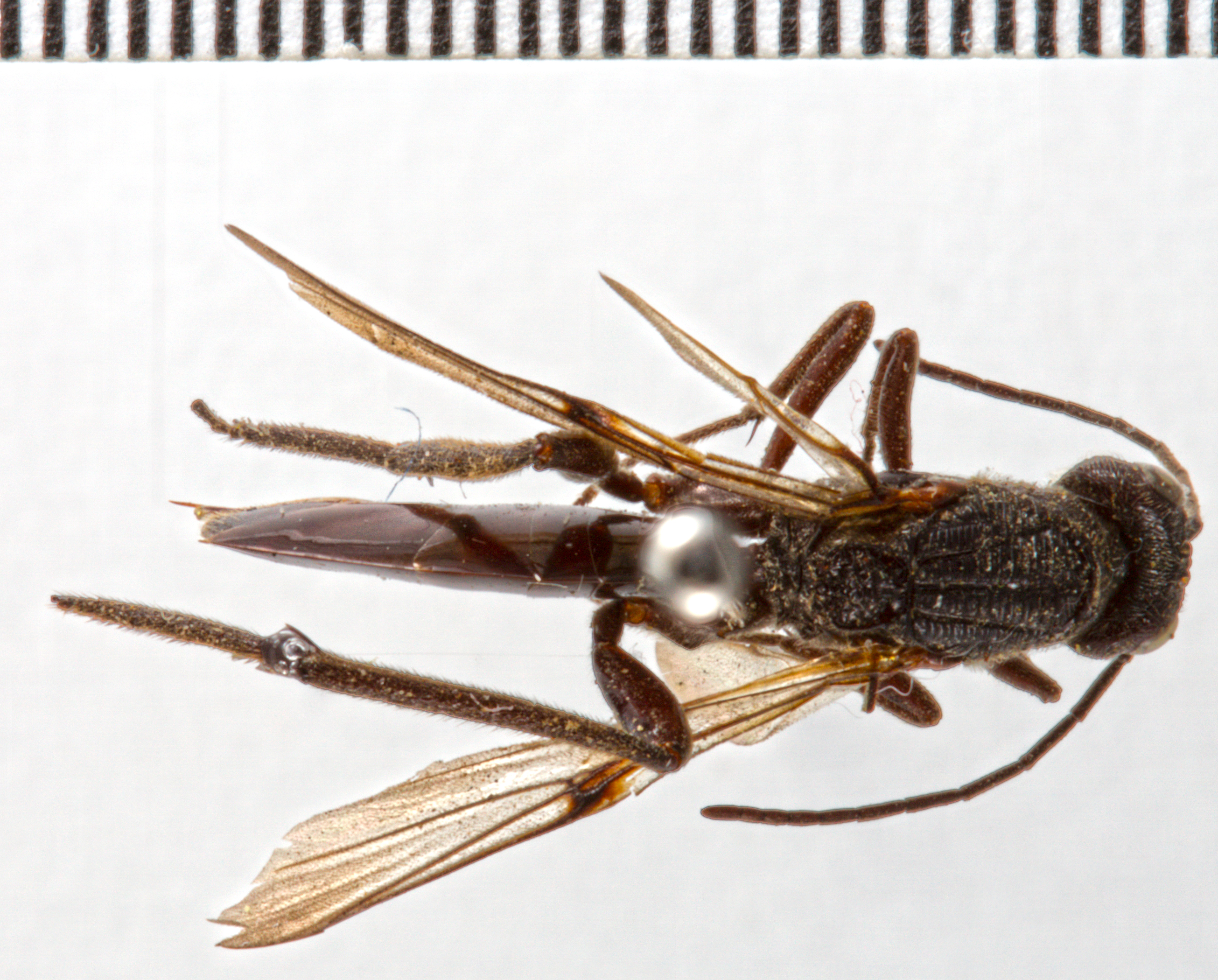
Ibalia leucospoides, note the compressed gaster

Ibalia rufipes with Ibaliidae characteristics marked out
Mesosoma

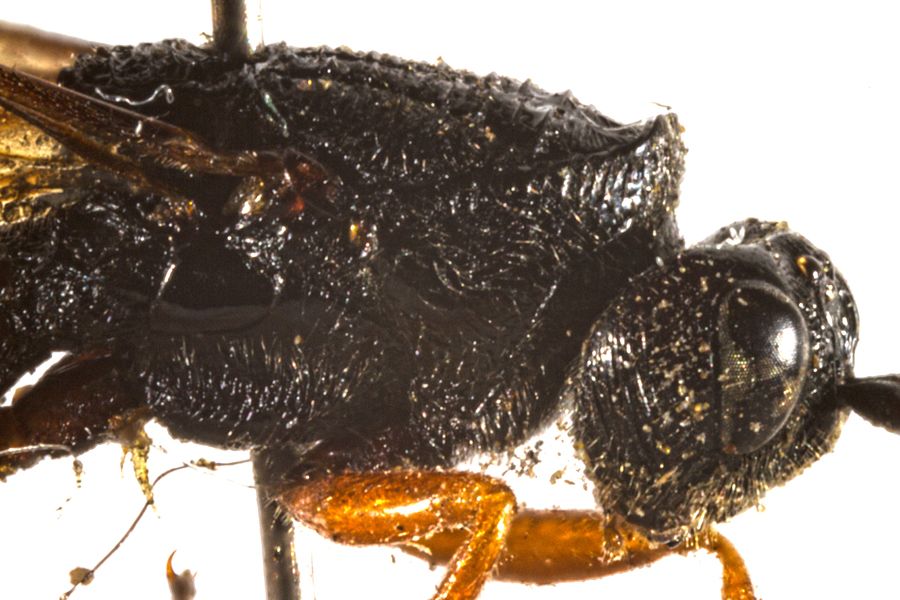

1 / Swollen genae; 2 / Dorsal pronotal area	3 / Scutellar processes; 4 / Transverse crest

Forewing

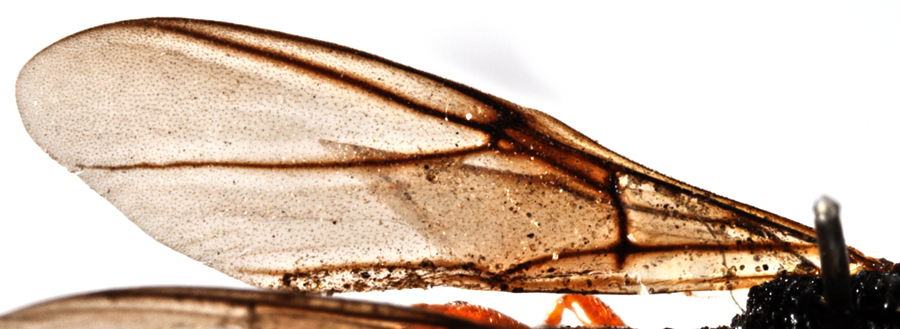

1	Marginal cell

Hind tarsus

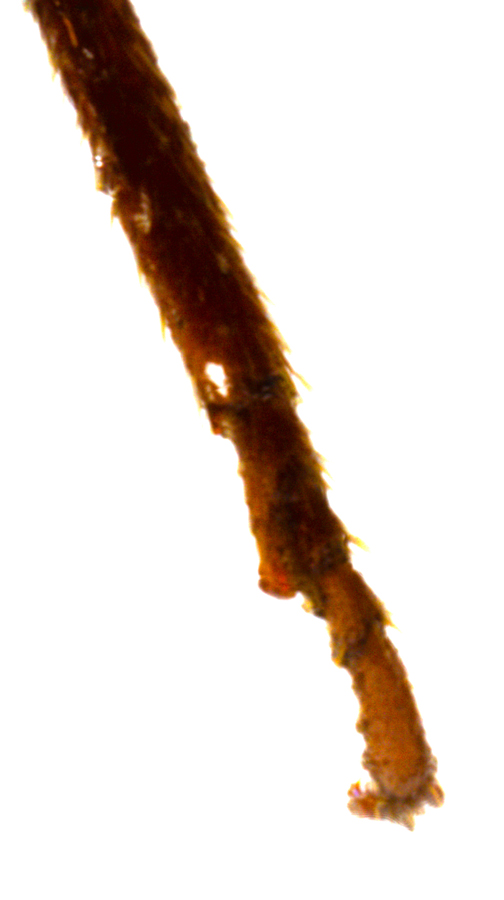

1	Tubular process on second tarsomere

=== Reproduction and parasitism ===
The female lays the egg by oviposition through the oviposition shafts created by Siricidae, and the egg is deposited inside a siricid larva. In the species Ibalia drewseni Borries, Ibalia leucospoides (Hochenwarth) and Ibalia japonica Matsumura, host detection by symbiotic fungus in the siricid has been observed.

The larva lives it in its first instars as an endoparasite, and later exits the host and lives on the remaining host tissues. The primary instar is polypodeiform with paired appendages on segments 1–12, and in the second to fourth instars, the appendages are lost. Until the terminal instar, the remaining cauda is gradually decreased.

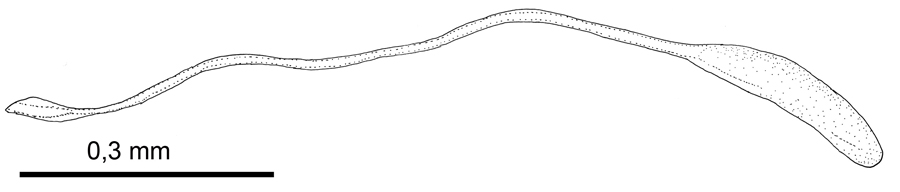
Ibalia rufipes egg

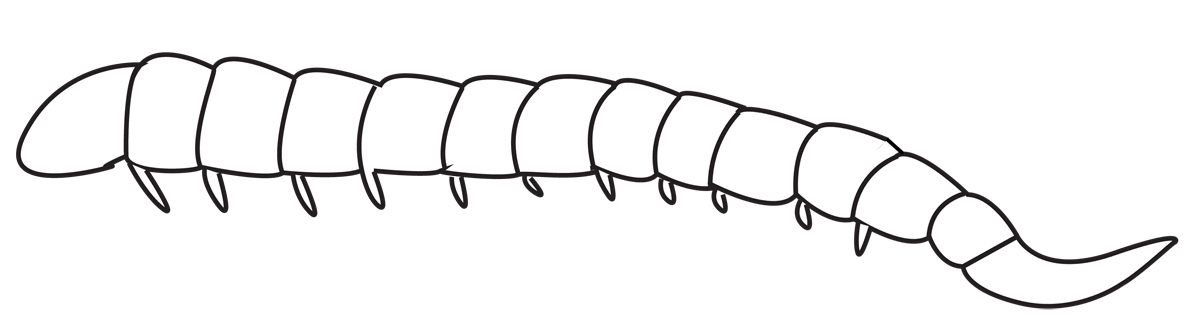
Ibaliidae larva

The two subgenera of Ibalia differ in host choice, the subgenus Ibalia parasitizes coniferous-living Siricinae larvae and the subgenus Tremibalia parasitizes hardwood-living Tremicinae larvae. Few details are known about the genera Heteribalia and Eileenella, but both also parasitize wood-boring Siricidae.

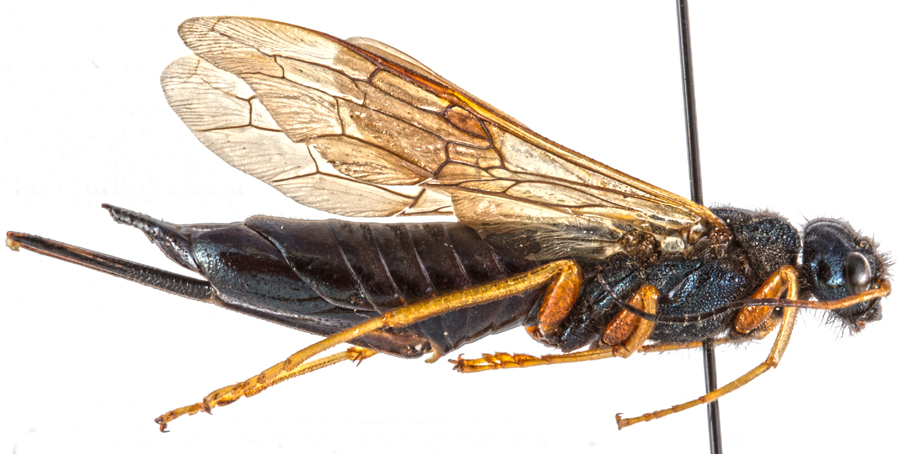
Sirex cyaneus, host of Ibalia leucospoides

== Pest control ==
Several species in the genus Ibalia have been introduced to South America, Australia, and New Zealand, sometimes to control previous accidentally introduced Siricidae species parasitizing economically important pine forests. Species used are, for example, Ibalia leucospoides and I. ensiger Norton. Results from introductions vary, and studies of long-term effects are lacking, but in some areas, the effects on pests have been successful; Siricidae populations have been strongly limited. They are most effective in combination with other parasitoid organisms, such as nematodes.

== Distribution and evolution ==
The Ibaliidae are concentrated to the Northern Hemisphere, the single species in Eileenella found in Papua New Guinea is the only specimen reported to be naturally occurring in the Southern Hemisphere. Ibalia is the most widespread and diverse genus, with the subgenus Tremibalia concentrated in China and the eastern Palearctic realm, and Ibalia in the western Nearctic realm. Heteribalia only occurs in South Asia and Japan. Phylogenetic analyses have indicated the Ibaliidae have spread from the eastern Palearctic and northern Asian regions in the early Cretaceous.

An insect-parasitic life mode is probably ancestral in the cynipoid families, and the Ibaliidae are placed next to Austrocynipidae, as a sister group to Liopteridae, Figitidae and Cynipidae.

- Ibaliidae
  - †Archaeibalia
  - - Eileenella
      E. catherinae
    - - Heteribalia
        - H. confluens
        - H. nishijimai
        - H. divergens
        - H. subtilis
        - H. aureopilosa
      - Ibalia
        - Tremibalia (subgenus)
          - I. jakowlewi
          - I. ornata
          - I. anceps
          - I. kalimantanica
          - I. hunanica
          - I. japonica
          - I. mirabilis
        - Ibalia (subgenus)
          - I. aprilina
          - I. rufipes
          - I. montana
          - I. kirki
          - I. arizonica
          - I. rufficollis
          - I. leucospoides
