= Austronia nigricula =

Scientific classification
- Kingdom: Animalia
- Phylum: Arthropoda
- Clade: Pancrustacea
- Class: Insecta
- Order: Hymenoptera
- Family: Austroniidae
- Genus: Austronia
- Species: A. nigricula

Binomial name
- Austronia nigricula Riek E.F, 1955

Species of wasp

Austronia nigricula is a species of parasitoid wasp in the family Austroniidae native to moist forests of southern Australia and Tasmania.

== Description and identification ==
Females possess an ovipositor around 1 mm (0.04 in) in length; however it is partially retracted into laterally compressed metasoma. Currently very little is known about the biology of Austronia nigricula and is only differentiated from A. nitida and A. rubrithorax by the colour of the thorax and legs.
