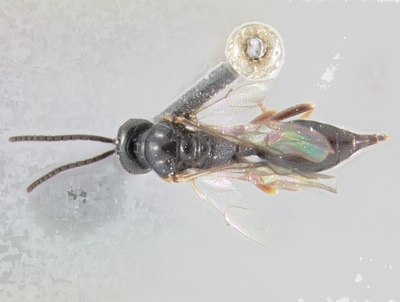
- Austronia nitida

Scientific classification
- Kingdom: Animalia
- Phylum: Arthropoda
- Clade: Pancrustacea
- Class: Insecta
- Order: Hymenoptera
- Suborder: Apocrita
- Infraorder: Proctotrupomorpha
- Superfamily: Diaprioidea
- Family: Austroniidae
- Genus: Austronia; Riek, 1955

Type species
- Austronia nitida Riek, 1955

= Austronia =

Genus of wasps

Austronia is a genus of wasps endemic to Australia. It is the only genus in the family Austroniidae. Three species are currently recognized. Members of this genus are 4-6 millimeters long and are found in the wet forests of southern Australia and Tasmania.

== Species ==
- Austronia nigricula (Riek, 1955)
- Austronia nitida (Riek, 1955)
- Austronia rubrithorax (Riek, 1955)
