= Austrocynips =

Scientific classification
- Kingdom: Animalia
- Phylum: Arthropoda
- Clade: Pancrustacea
- Class: Insecta
- Order: Hymenoptera
- Suborder: Apocrita
- Infraorder: Proctotrupomorpha
- Superfamily: Cynipoidea
- Family: Austrocynipidae; Riek, 1971
- Genus: Austrocynips; Riek, 1971
- Species: A. mirabilis

Binomial name
- Austrocynips mirabilis Riek, 1971

Species of parasitic wasp

Austrocynips mirabilis is a species of parasitic wasp. It is the only species in the genus Austrocynips and the family Austrocynipidae. It was originally described as a subfamily of Cynipidae; however, it was promoted to family status in 1995.

== Description ==
This species is distinguished by being the only species in the superfamily Cynipoidea to have a pterostigma on the forewing.

== Distribution ==
This species is endemic only to Australia, and has mainly been found in eastern Australia.
