= Pristomyrmex rasnitsyni =

Pristomyrmex rasnitsyni Temporal range: Late Eocene

Scientific classification
- Kingdom: Animalia
- Phylum: Arthropoda
- Clade: Pancrustacea
- Class: Insecta
- Order: Hymenoptera
- Family: Formicidae
- Subfamily: Myrmicinae
- Genus: Pristomyrmex
- Species: †P. rasnitsyni

Binomial name
- †Pristomyrmex rasnitsyni Dlussky & Radchenko, 2011

Extinct species of ant

Pristomyrmex rasnitsyni is an extinct species of ant in the genus Pristomyrmex. The species is known from a single Late Eocene fossil which was found in Europe.

== History and classification ==
Pristomyrmex rasnitsyni is known from a solitary fossil, the holotype, specimen number 1.ii.1969, which is currently in the collections of the University of Copenhagen. The fossil is composed of a mostly complete adult worker which has been preserved as an inclusion in a transparent chunk of Scandinavian amber, also called Danish amber. Scandinavian amber is thought to be similar in age to Baltic, Bitterfeld and Rovno ambers, being approximately late Eocene in age. The four amber faunas have been shown to share 17 ant species in common, which make up over 80% of the specimens in amber collections studied for a 2009 paper. Though a large portion of specimens from Scandinavian amber are of species found in the other ambers, the overall fauna found is notably different from the other three. About twenty-four genera with thirty-five species of ants have been identified as inclusions in Scandinavian amber.

The fossil was first studied by paleoentomologists Gennady M. Dlussky of the Moscow State University and A. D. Radchenko of the Polish Academy of Sciences. Their 2011 type description of the new species was published in the Russian Entomological Journal. The specific epithet rasnitsyni is a patronym honoring Russian paleoentomologist Alexandr Pavlovich Rasnitsyn.

When described, Pristomyrmex rasnitsyni was the first member of the genus Pristomyrmex to have been described from the fossil record. The modern species are found primarily in Eastern Asia south through the eastern coast of Australia. Most species live in tropical regions, with the species P. punctatus ranging north to temperate Japan on the Southern portion of Hokkaido. P. rasnitsyni is also the first record of the genus from Europe.

== Description ==
The solitary Pristomyrmex rasnitsyni specimen is well preserved with an estimated length of around 3.0 millimetres (0.12 in). The head is shorter than it is wide, with a clypeus sporting teeth on the sides and a single central tooth. The antennae are eleven segments long showing a fully exposed base and clubbed tips composed of three segments. While the mandibles are hard to see, they do show a blunt basal tooth in combination with a large tooth at the apex and an associated shorter tooth next to the apical tooth. The pronotum displays a pair of spines angled upward and rearward and a 40° angle. Both the alitrunk have a notable and coarse reticulated pattern, while the clypeus, petiole, and post-petiole areas are notably smooth.
