= Gallorommatidae =

Gallorommatidae Temporal range: Barremian–Cenomanian

Scientific classification
- Kingdom: Animalia
- Phylum: Arthropoda
- Class: Insecta
- Order: Hymenoptera
- Suborder: Apocrita
- Infraorder: Proctotrupomorpha
- Superfamily: Mymarommatoidea; Gibson et al., 2007
- Family: †Gallorommatidae; Schlüter, 1978

Genera
- †Galloromma; †Cretaceomma

Family of wasps

The Gallorommatidae is an extinct family of microscopic parasitoid wasps, belonging to the Mymarommatoidea. It is known from several species found in Cretaceous aged amber.

== Species ==
- †Galloromma
  - †Galloromma agapa from Taimyr amber, Late Cretaceous (Cenomanian)
  - †Galloromma alavaensis from the Escucha Formation, Early Cretaceous (Albian)
  - †Galloromma bezonnaisensis from Bezonnais amber, France, Late Cretaceous (Cenomanian)
  - †Galloromma kachinensis from Burmese amber, mid Cretaceous (latest Albian-earliest Cenomanian)
- †Cretaceomma
  - †Cretaceomma libanensis from Lebanese amber, Early Cretaceous (Barremian)
  - †Cretaceomma turolensis also from the Eschucha Formation.
