= Pristomyrmex tsujii =

Scientific classification
- Kingdom: Animalia
- Phylum: Arthropoda
- Class: Insecta
- Order: Hymenoptera
- Family: Formicidae
- Subfamily: Myrmicinae
- Genus: Pristomyrmex
- Species: P. tsujii

Binomial name
- Pristomyrmex tsujii Sarnat & Economo, 2013

Species of ant

Pristomyrmex tsujii (named for Prof. Kazuki Tsuji) is a species of ant in the genus Pristomyrmex. Known from Fiji, where they are widely distributed but rarely encountered. The species has a discrete ergatoid queen caste that is intermediate between a worker and an alate queen.

== Habitat and distribution ==
Despite being widely distributed across the Fijian archipelago, workers of Pristomyrmex tsujii are rarely encountered in the field, although males have been collected in Malaise traps with some frequency. Workers have been collected from Gau, Koro, Vanua Levu and Viti Levu. Of these, all were collected in leaf litter samples except for one found foraging on a fallen tree and another found foraging under a stone. Collection records suggest the species prefers primary rainforest, but several collections from secondary forests and forest fragments suggest it can tolerate some degree of disturbance. The strongly distended gasters of the ergatoid queens are presumably equipped with functional ovaries, but a more thorough examination of fresh material would be required to verify their reproductive potential. It is also unknown whether the ergatoid queens occur in the same nests as alate queens, or if they are capable of founding their own colonies.

== Description ==
Pristomyrmex tsujii workers are polished red, stoutly built and often foveolate. The propodeum is either armed with small denticles or entirely unarmed. The lack of strong propodeal spines separates workers, ergatoid queens and alate queens of Pristomyrmex tsujii from those of the sympatric Pristomyrmex mandibularis. The same character is used to diagnose the males, but the spines are reduced to denticles in Pristomyrmex mandibularis and entirely absent in Pristomyrmex tsujii. Additionally, the males of Pristomyrmex tsujii tend more towards brown than black. The only congeneric species with an unarmed propodeum is Pristomyrmex inermis from New Guinea which also belongs to the levigatus group. Pristomyrmex tsujii has a more nodiform petiole, a stronger median clypeal tooth, and more abundant foveae between the frontal carinae.

=== Workers ===
Head shape is circular with posterior margin flat to feebly concave medially in full-face view. Antenna is 11-segmented with apical three segments forming a distinct club. Antennal insertion is surrounded by a raised and unbroken lamella. Frontal carina is distinct and extends just past the level of the posterior eye margin. Weak median carina, approximately same length as terminal antennal segment, extending posteriorly from between antennal insertions and transitioning into a weak median groove that terminates near eye level. Frontal lobe is weakly expanded as a thin lamella. Eye moderate-sized, approximately same size as antennal socket, 3–4 facets along longest diameter. Clypeus is flat and unsculptured. Median part of clypeus shield-like, projecting posteriorly between the bases of the antennae. Anterior clypeal margin tridentate with a median tooth and two lateral teeth; the median tooth similar in size or slightly smaller than the others. Ventral surface of clypeus smooth, lacking a transverse ruga. Lateral portions of clypeus anterior to antennal insertions reduced to a narrow margin. Mandibles mostly smooth with a few weak striae. Masticatory margin of mandible lacking a diastema and possessing four teeth. The third tooth, counting from the apex, is the smallest. A strongly prominent tooth present about midway on the basal margin of mandible. Anterior portion of dorsal labrum with two tooth-like prominences. Palp formula 1, 3. Dorsum of mesosoma in profile view evenly arched, broken only by a weak impression separating the mesonotum from the propodeum. Pronotum unarmed; indistinct obtuse humeral angle. Propodeum armed with pair of small but distinct acute denticles to entirely unarmed. Propodeal lobes triangular, obtusely rounded. Fore tibial spur pectinate. Middle and hind tibiae lacking spurs. Petiole node in profile is high, taller than long, with anterior face weakly convex, dorsal face flat to weakly convex, and posterior faces weakly convex to weakly concave. Petiolar peduncle tapering broadly into petiolar node and approximately as long as petiolar node. Postpetiole in profile as tall or occasionally taller than petiole, approximately two times as tall as long; anterior face sloping evenly into dorsal face and junction of posterior face and dorsal face more angular. Dorsum of head covered with scattered to abundant weakly impressed foveae. Dorsum of mesosoma smooth and shining. Petiole and postpetiole are smooth and shining, each with a weak lateral longitudinal carina on both sides. Gaster unsculptured. Dorsal surface of head with numerous erect to suberect long hairs originating from center of foveolae. Mesosoma with 4–5 pairs of long erect hairs. Petiolar peduncle with one pair of erect hairs. Petiolar and postpetiolar nodes each with one pair of posteriorly projecting erect hairs. First gastral segment with 1–3 pairs of erect hairs on anterior third. Scape and tibia with numerous erect to suberect hairs. All surfaces are shiny, polished yellowish brown to reddish brown.

=== Ergatoid queen ===
Closely resembling the worker in the structure of mandibles, clypeus, petiole, postpetiole and gaster in addition to sculpture, color and pilosity. Head with a single well-defined depression in place of the median ocellus. Mesosoma in dorsal view with a promesonotal suture but lacking sclerites associated with alate queen. Mesonotum is more convex. Propodeal spines are either absent or reduced to acute angles. Dorsum of head is covered with scattered to abundant weakly impressed foveolae and smaller shallow punctures. Dorsum of mesosoma is similar to alate queen with one or two additional pairs of erect hairs than worker.

=== Alate queens ===
Closely resembling worker in the structure of the mandibles, clypeus, petiole, postpetiole and gaster in addition to sculpture, color and pilosity with the following differences. Larger. Eyes are much larger with diameter composed of ca. 12 facets. Three ocelli is present. Posterior head margin is weakly concave. Mesosoma is marked with wing sclerites and dorsal sutures. Wing shape and venation is unknown (only dealate specimens available for examination). Propodeal spines are either absent or reduced to acute angles. Dorsum of head is covered with scattered to abundant weakly impressed foveolae and smaller shallow punctures. Dorsum of mesosoma with more than 10 pairs of erect hairs.

=== Males ===
Head, including the eyes, is broader than long. Dorsal portion of occipital margin is raised into a transverse carina from which short lengths of longitudinal carinae originate. Frontal carina is weak, terminating before reaching the posterior level of the eye. Clypeus with a median longitudinal carina and 1–3 pair of lateral carinae extending towards the anterior margin. Anterior clypeal margin is flat to weakly convex. Mesoscutum with distinct notauli forming a Y-shape. Parapsidal furrows reduced to weak impressions. Scuto-scutellar sulcus with 7–10 narrow longitudinal ridges visible in dorsal view. Propodeum is unarmed to weakly tuberculate, lacking teeth or spines. Propodeal lobes are obtusely triangular with a blunt or rounded apex; sometimes reduced to weak flanges. Middle and hind tibiae lacking spurs. Petiole in profile is cuneiform; node with a convex posterior face but lacking a distinct anterior face. Peduncle long. Postpetiole in profile is weakly nodiform with a steeply convex anterior face and shorter, more gently sloped posterior face. In dorsal view, subrectangular and broader than long. Dorsum of head is smooth and shining. Dorsal scutum is weakly foveolate. Sides of the mesosoma are smooth and shining, occasionally with several short carinulae on metapleuron and propodeum. Petiole and postpetiole are smooth and shining. Gaster is unsculptured. All dorsal surfaces with abundant long hairs. Legs and scapes with numerous erect or suberect short hairs. Color is reddish brown with lighter brown appendages. Wings are infuscated.

== Geographic variation ==
Pristomyrmex tsujii varies in the abundance of the cephalic foveae, propodeal armament and petiolar node shape. In Koro (the type locality) and Gau the specimens exhibit a sparse scattering of foveae and punctures usually separated from each other by a distance exceeding their diameters. None of the Koro specimens are armed even with denticles and the petiolar node is relatively broad in profile with a weakly convex posterior face. The series from Taveuni has sparse fovea and the worker from Vanua Levu has moderate foveae. Workers from both islands have an unarmed propodeum, like those from Koro, but the petiolar node is narrower in profile with a weakly concave posterior face. The postpetiolar nodes of workers from both Taveuni and Vanua Levu are taller than the petiolar node. The workers from Viti Levu are all more foveolate than those from the outlying islands. The strongest sculpture was found on a specimen from Waivudawa. The petiolar and postpetiolar shapes of Viti Levu workers are more similar to those of Koro workers than those of Taveuni and Vanua Levu. Some of the Viti Levu workers have an unarmed propodeum like those of the outlying islands, whereas others have a propodeum armed with an acute denticle equal or less than the size of the propodeal lobe.
