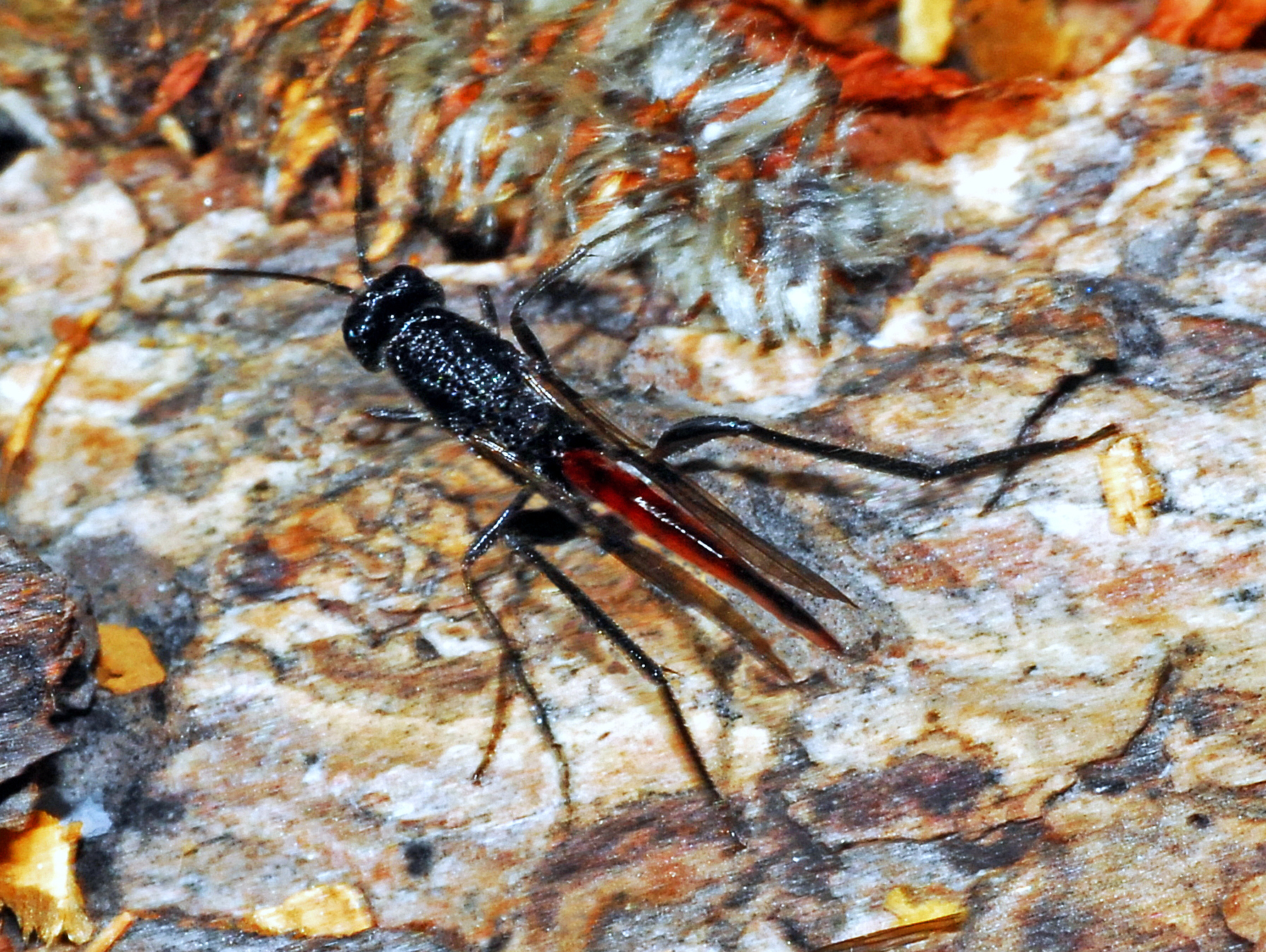

Scientific classification
- Kingdom: Animalia
- Phylum: Arthropoda
- Class: Insecta
- Order: Hymenoptera
- Family: Ibaliidae
- Genus: Ibalia
- Species: I. leucospoides

Binomial name
- Ibalia leucospoides (Hochenwarth, 1785)

Synonyms
- Ichneumon leucospoides Hochenwarth, 1785; Ibalia (Ibalia) leucospoides (Hochenwarth, 1785); Ibalia arcuata Dalla Torre & Kieffer, 1910; Ichneumon cultellator Fabricius, 1793; Ibalia picea Matsumora, 1912; Ibalia sachalinensis Matsumora, 1911; Ibalia suprunenkoi Jacobson, 1899

= Ibalia leucospoides =

Species of wasp

Ibalia leucospoides, the knife-shaped ibalia, is a species of ibaliid wasp in the family Ibaliidae.

== Subspecies ==
These two subspecies belong to the species Ibalia leucospoides:

- Ibalia leucospoides ensiger Norton, 1862
- Ibalia leucospoides leucospoides (Hochenwarth, 1785)

== Distribution ==
This species is widespread in Africa, Australia, most of Europe and Northern Asia (excluding China), North America, and Southern Asia.

== Habitat ==
These ibaliid wasps mainly can be found in forests dominated by various conifers genera (Abies, Cupressus, Libocedrus, Picea, Pinus and Tsuga species). This species has been introduced into conifer plantations of various countries to exert biological control pressure on pest populations.

== Description ==
Ibalia leucospoides can reach a body length of about 15 mm (0.59 in). These small wasp have black head, thorax and legs. Abdomen is dark red, rectangular, pronouncedly compressed laterally and unmarked. Antennae are filiform, with 13 antennal segments in males (11 in females). The wings are transparent, with semitransparent apical ends. This species is rather similar to Ibalia anceps, that shows a different color pattern.

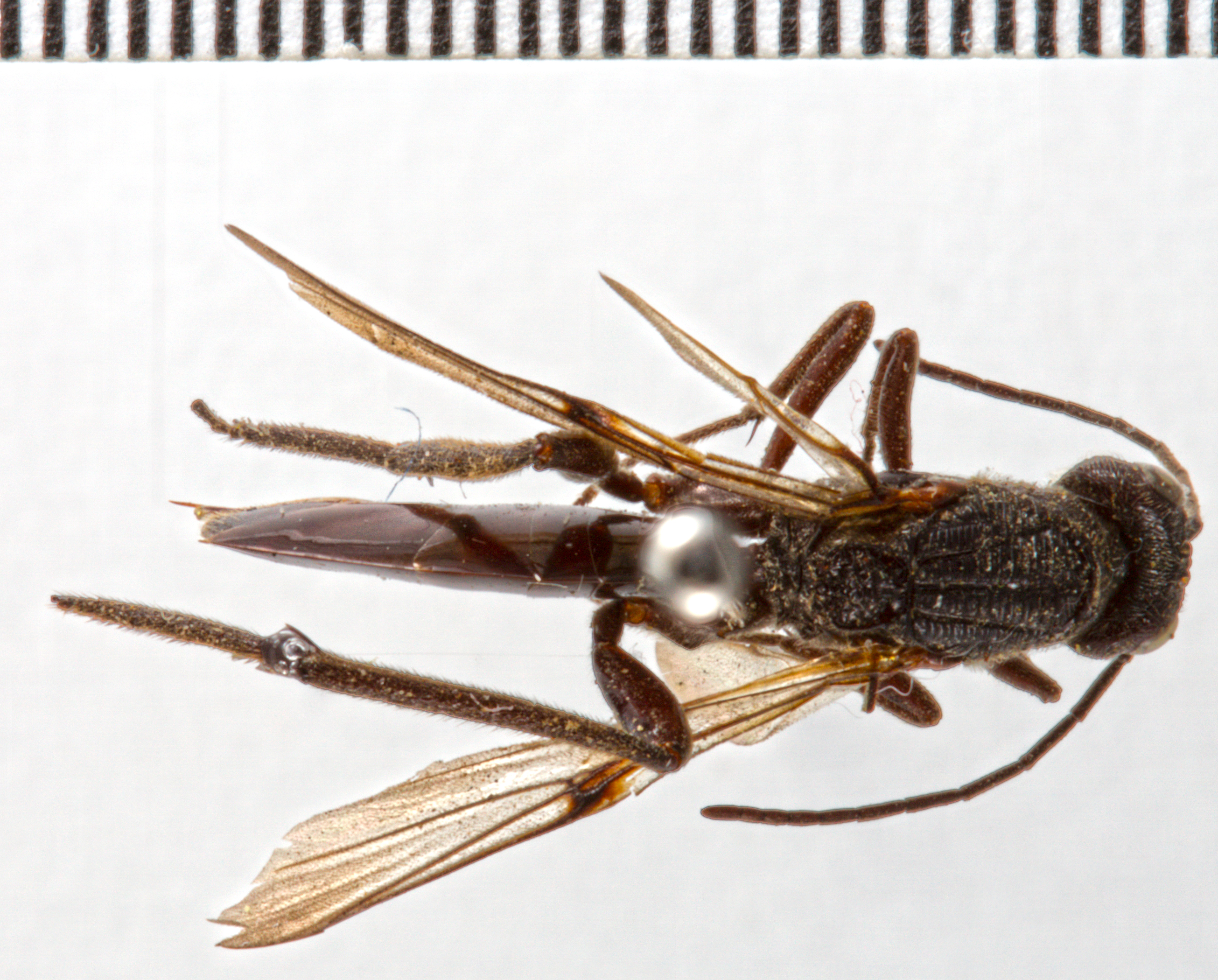
Mounted specimen

== Biology ==
This species has one generation a year (univoltine), typically coinciding with host emergence. Adults can be found from April to December, depending on location. Females lay eggs on the egg or first instar larvae of siricids. In fact, these wasps are solitary parasitoids of woodwasps (Siricidae family), especially Sirex, Urocerus and Xeris species. The oviposition sites of siricids presumably are located through the sense of smell. When the parasitoids emerge, they feed on the remains of larvae of the woodwasps, until they pupate.

== Biography ==
- Cameron, E. A. (1962) North American survey for natural enemies of the Siricidae, May–October, 1962. CBIC Report, California Station, Fontana, CA. 21 pp.
- Cameron, E. A. (2012) Parasitoids in the management of Sirex: looking back and looking ahead, Ch. 8. In B. Slippers, P. de Groot, and M. J. Wingfield (eds.), The Sirex Woodwasp and its Fungal Symbiont: Research and Management of a Worldwide Invasive Pest. Springer, New York, NY.
- Champlain, A. B. (1922) Records of hymenopterous parasites in Pennsylvania. Psyche 29: 95–100.
- Coyle, D. R., and K. J. K. Gandhi. (2012) The ecology and biological control potential of hymenopteran parasitoids of woodwasps (Hymenoptera: Siricidae) in North America. Environ. Entomol. 41: 731–749.
- Eager, P. T., D. C. Allen, J. L. Frair, and M. K. Fierke. (2011) Within-tree distributions of the Sirex noctilio Fabricius (Hymenoptera: Siricidae) - parasitoid complex and development of an optimal sampling scheme. Environ. Entomol. 40: 1266–1275.
- Liu, Z., and G. Nordlander. (1992) Ibaliid parasitoids of siricids woodwasps in North America: two new Ibalia species and a key to species (Hymenoptera: Cynipoidea). Proc. Entomol. Soc. Wash. 94: 500–507.
- Liu Z., Nordlander G. - Review of the family Ibaliidae (Hymenoptera: Cynipoidea) with keys to genera and species of the world - Entomologica Scandinavica 25: 377–392, 1994
- Long, S. J., D. W. Williams, and A. E. Hajek. (2009) Sirex species (Hymenoptera: Siricidae) and their parasitoids in Pinus sylvestris in eastern North America. Can. Entomol. 141: 153–157.
- Norton, E. (1963) A description of several new Hymenoptera. Proceedings of the Entomological Society of Philadelphia 1: 198–200.
- Ryan, K., P. de Groot, R. W. Nott, S. Drabble, I. Ochoa, C. Davis, S. M. Smith, and J. J. Turgeon. (2012) Natural enemies associated with Sirex noctilio (Hymenoptera: Siricidae) and S. nigricornis in Ontario, Canada. Environ. Entomol. 41: 289–297.
- Schiff, N. M., H. Goulet, D. R. Smith, C. Boudreault, A. D. Wilson, and B. E. Scheffler. (2012) Siricidae (Hymenoptera: Symphyta: Siricoidea) of the Western Hemisphere. Can. J. Arthropod Ident. 21: 1–305.
- Smith, D. R., and N. M. Schiff. (2002) A review of the siricid woodwasps and their ibaliid parasitoids (Hymenoptera: Siricidae, Ibaliidae) in the eastern United States, with emphasis on the mid-Atlantic region. Proc. Entomol. Soc. Wash. 104: 174–194.
- Taylor, K. L. (1976) The introduction and establishment of insect parasitoids to control Sirex noctilio in Australia. Entomophaga 21: 429–440.
- Weld, L. H. (1952) Cynipoidea (Hym.) 1905–1950. Privately printed, Ann Arbor, MI. 351 pp.
- Yoshimoto, C. M. (1970) A new ibaliid wasp from North America (Hymenoptera: Cynipoidea, Ibaliidae). Can. Entomol. 102: 1196–1198.
