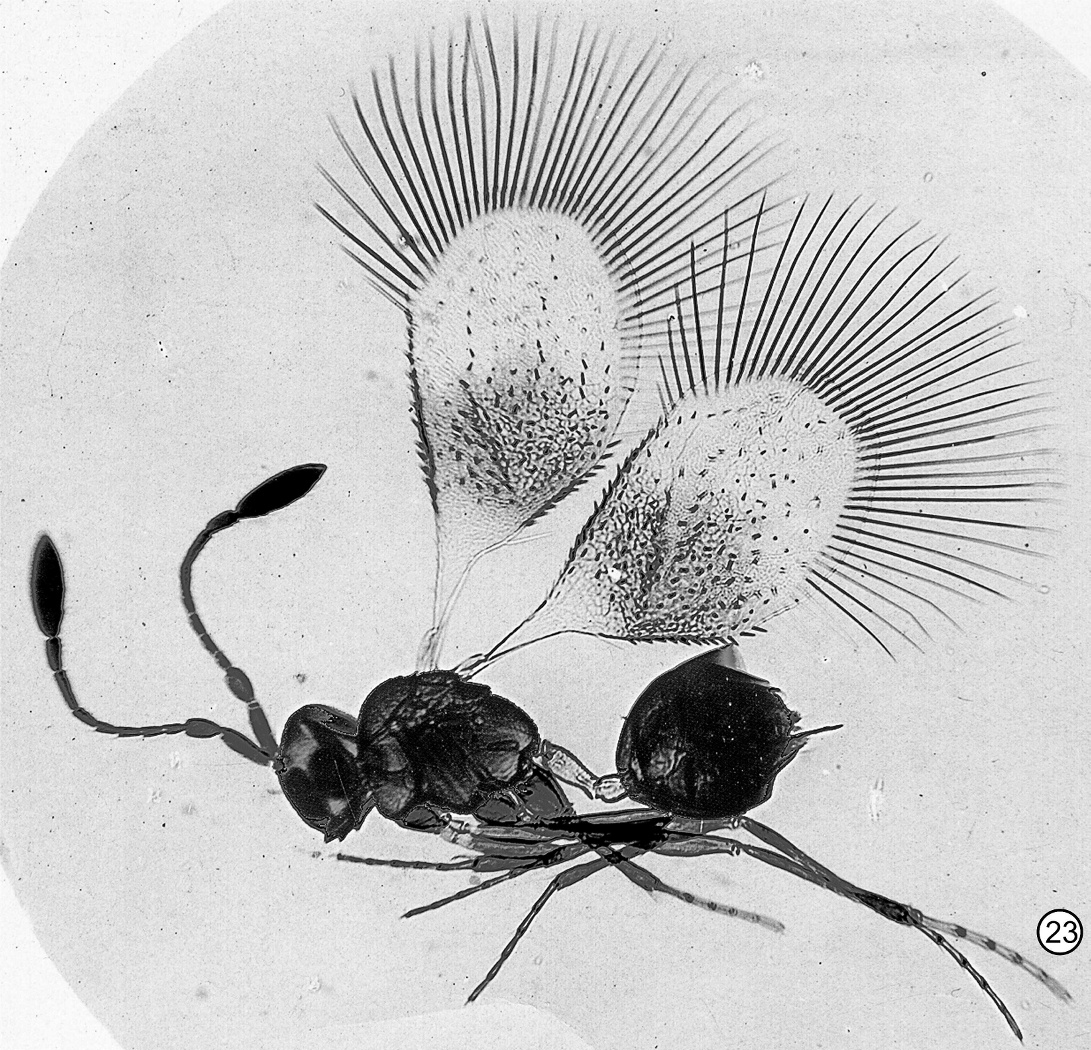

Scientific classification
- Kingdom: Animalia
- Phylum: Arthropoda
- Clade: Pancrustacea
- Class: Insecta
- Order: Hymenoptera
- Infraorder: Proctotrupomorpha
- Superfamily: Mymarommatoidea; Debauche, 1948

Families
- †Alavarommatidae †Dipterommatidae †Gallorommatidae; Mymarommatidae

= Mymarommatoidea =

Mymarommatoidea Temporal range: Barremian–Present

Superfamily of wasps

The Mymarommatoidea are a very small superfamily of microscopic fairyfly-like parasitic wasps. It contains only a single living family, Mymarommatidae, and three other extinct families known from Cretaceous aged amber. Less than half of all described species are living taxa (the others are fossils), but they are known from all parts of the world. Undoubtedly, many more await discovery, as they are easily overlooked and difficult to study due to their extremely small size (most have an overall length of around 0.3 mm).

== Classification ==
As taxonomists have examined this group more closely, they have become less certain about which other group of wasps represents the nearest living relatives of the Mymarommatoidea. They are generally placed in the Proctotrupomorpha, amongst the group that includes all members of Proctotrupomorpha other than Cynipoidea. Their closest relatives seem to be the extinct superfamily Serphitoidea (including Serphitidae and Archaeoserphitidae), with both groups being united in the clade Bipetiolarida. There is no consensus on how the four families of Mymarommatoidea relate to each other.

†Alavarommatidae Ortega-Blanco, Peñalver, Delclòs, & Engel, 2011

†Alavaromma Ortega-Blanco, Peñalver, Delclòs, & Engel, 2011

(1 species) Spanish amber, Early Cretaceous (Albian)

†Dipterommatidae Rasnitsyn et al., 2019

†Dipteromma Rasnitsyn et al., 2019

(1 species) Burmese amber, Myanmar, Late Cretaceous (Cenomanian)

†Gallorommatidae Gibson, Read, & Huber, 2007

Six species, (Barremian-Cenomanian)

†Galloromma Schlüter, 1978
†Cretaceomma Rasnitsyn et al., 2022

Mymarommatidae Debauche, 1948

Five genera, Albian-Recent

†Palaeomymar Meunier, 1901
†Archaeromma Yoshimoto, 1975
Mymaromma Girault, 1920
Mymarommella Girault, 1931
Zealaromma Gibson, Read, & Huber, 2007

== Biology ==
There is only one confirmed host for any member of the superfamily; the species Mymaromma menehune from the Hawaiian Islands is a solitary endoparasitoid of eggs of a Lepidopsocus sp. (Psocodea: Lepidopsocidae) living on Ficus microcarpa trees.
