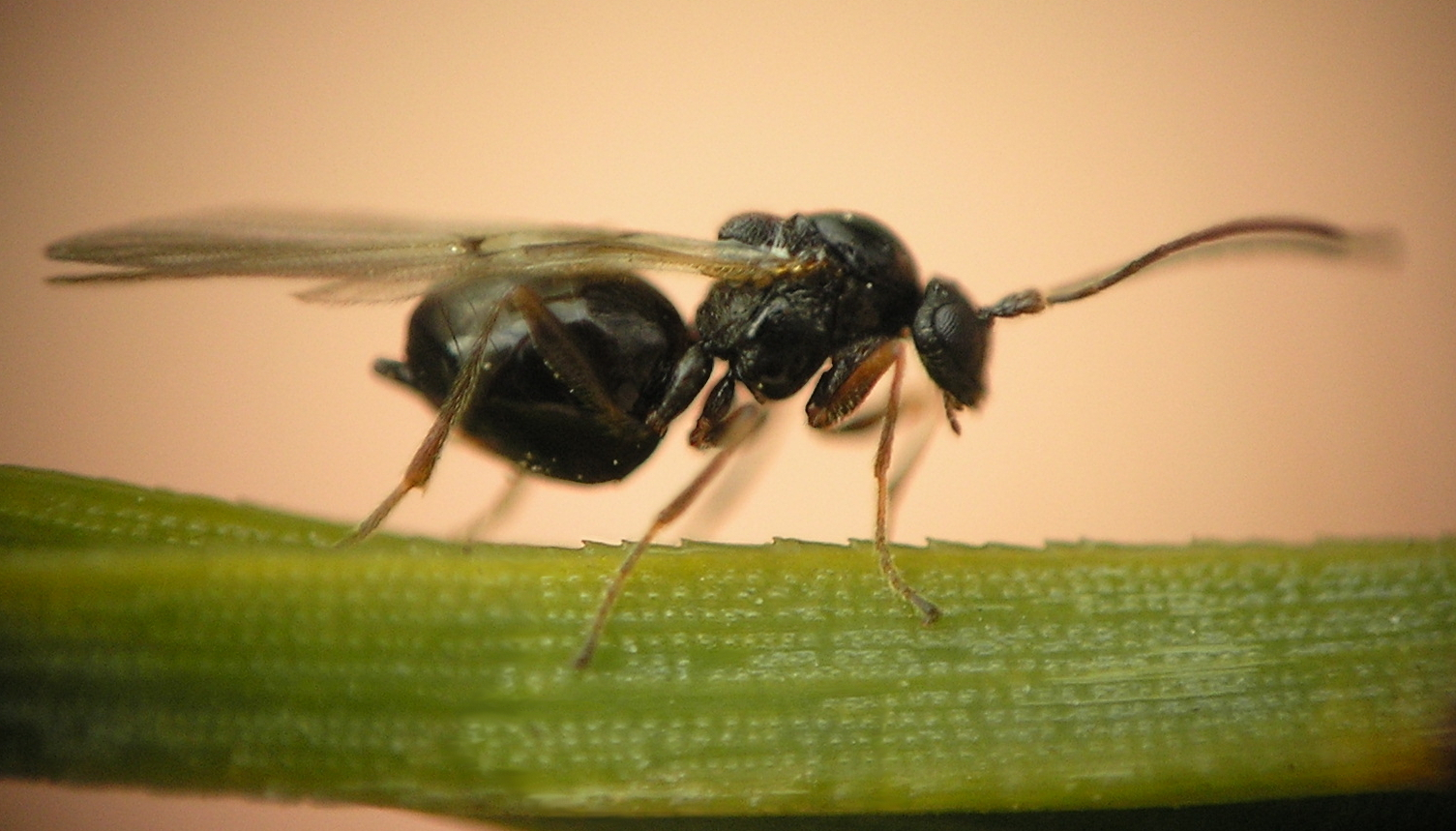
- Cynips quercusfolii

Scientific classification
- Kingdom: Animalia
- Phylum: Arthropoda
- Class: Insecta
- Order: Hymenoptera
- Infraorder: Proctotrupomorpha
- Superfamily: Cynipoidea

Families
- Austrocynipidae Riek, 1971; Cynipidae Latreille, 1802; Diplolepididae Latreille, 1802; Figitidae Thomson, 1962; Ibaliidae Thomson, 1862; Liopteridae Ashmead, 1895; Paraulacidae Nieves-Aldrey & Liljeblad, 2009 †Protimaspidae Liu & Engel, 2007 †Stolamissidae Liu & Engel, 2007 †Gerocynipidae Liu & Engel, 2007

= Cynipoidea =

Cynipoidea Temporal range: Cretaceous-Present

Superfamily of wasps

The Cynipoidea are a moderate-sized hymenopteran superfamily that presently includes seven extant families and three extinct families, though others have been recognized in the past. The most familiar members of the group are phytophagous, especially as gall-formers, though the actual majority of included species are parasitoids or hyperparasitoids. They are typically glossy, dark, smooth wasps with somewhat compressed bodies and somewhat reduced wing venation. It is common for various metasomal segments to be fused in various ways (often diagnostic for families or subfamilies), and the petiole is very short, when present.

With the exception of the Cynipidae (the gall wasps), it is a poorly known group as a whole, though there are nearly 3000 known species in total, and a great many species are still undescribed, mostly in the Figitidae. Each of the constituent families differs in biology, though life histories of one of the families (Liopteridae) are still largely unknown. In July 2020, an identification key for the superfamily was published, enabling identification to the family/tribe level. Several groups formerly included in Cynipidae were elevated to family status in 2023.

== Classification ==
Family †Protimaspidae Liu & Engel, 2007

Family †Stolamissidae Liu & Engel, 2007

Family †Gerocynipidae Liu & Engel, 2007

Family Austrocynipidae Riek, 1971

Family Paraulacidae Nieves-Aldrey & Liljeblad, 2009

Family Diplolepididae Latreille, 1802

Subfamily Diplolepidinae Latreille, 1802
Subfamily Pediaspinae Ashmead, 1903

Family Ibaliidae Thomson, 1862

Subfamily †Archaeibaliinae Liu & Engel, 2010
Subfamily Ibaliinae Thomson, 1862

Family Liopteridae Ashmead, 1895

Subfamily †Proliopterinae Liu & Engel, 2007
Subfamily †Goeraniinae Liu & Engel, 2007
Subfamily Mayrellinae Hedicke, 1922
Subfamily Dallatorrellinae Kieffer, 1911
Subfamily Oberthuerellinae Hedicke, 1903
Subfamily Liopterinae Ashmead, 1895

Family Figitidae Thomson, 1862

Subfamily †Rasnicynipinae Kozlov, 1996
Subfamily †Palaeocynipinae Kozlov, 1995
Subfamily Charipinae Dalla Torre & Kieffer, 1910
Subfamily Emargininae Kovalev, 1994
Subfamily Eucoilinae Thomson, 1862

Tribe Diglyphosematini Belizin, 1961
Tribe Eucoilini Thomson, 1862
Tribe Ganaspini Belizin, 1961
Tribe Kleidotomini Hellén, 1960
Tribe Trichoplastini Kovalev, 1989
Tribe Zaeucoilini Buffington, 2009

Subfamily Figitinae Thomson, 1862
Subfamily Mikeiinae Paretas-Martinez & Pujade-Villar, 2011
Subfamily Aspicerinae Dalla Torre & Kieffer, 1910
Subfamily Anacharitinae Thomson, 1862
Subfamily Pycnostigminae Cameron, 1905
Subfamily Thrasorinae Kovalev, 1994
Subfamily Plectocynipinae Ros-Farré & Pujade-Villar, 2007
Subfamily Euceroptresinae Buffington & Liljeblad, 2008
Subfamily Parnipinae Ronquist & Nieves-Aldrey, 2001

Family Cynipidae Latreille, 1802

Subfamily †Hodiernocynipinae Kovalev, 1994
Subfamily Cynipinae Latreille, 1802

Tribe Aulacideini Nieves-Aldrey & Ronquist, 2015
Tribe Aylacini Ashmead, 1903
Tribe Ceroptresini Nieves-Aldrey, Nylander, & Ronquist, 2015
Tribe Cynipini Latreille, 1802
Tribe Diastrophini Nieves-Aldrey, Nylander, & Ronquist, 2015
Tribe Eschatocerini Ashmead, 1903
Tribe Phanacidini Nieves-Aldrey, Nylander, & Ronquist, 2015
Tribe Qwaqwaiini Liljeblad, Nieves-Aldrey, & Melika, 2011
Tribe Synergini Ashmead, 1896
