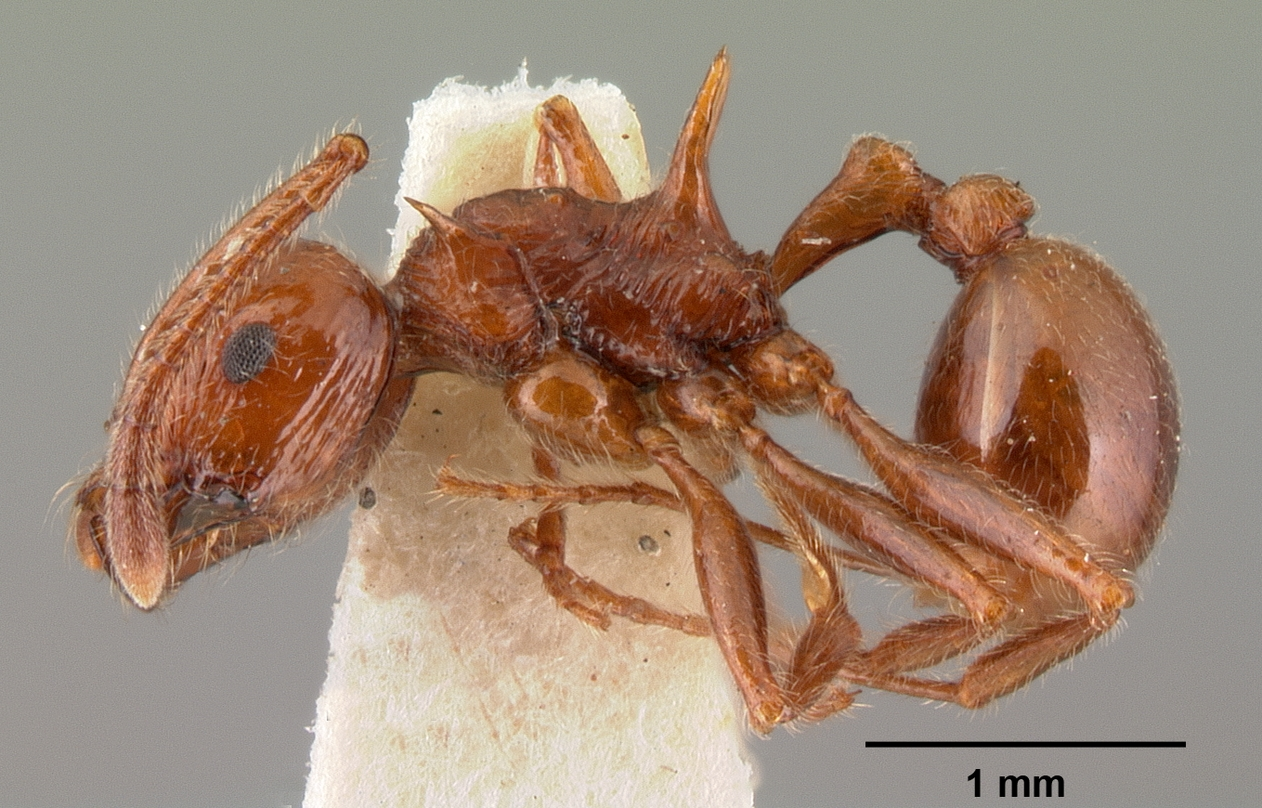
- P. bispinosus worker from Mauritius

Scientific classification
- Kingdom: Animalia
- Phylum: Arthropoda
- Class: Insecta
- Order: Hymenoptera
- Family: Formicidae
- Subfamily: Myrmicinae
- Tribe: Crematogastrini
- Alliance: Myrmecina genus group
- Genus: Pristomyrmex; Mayr, 1866

Type species
- Pristomyrmex pungens

Diversity
- 59 species

= Pristomyrmex =

Pristomyrmex Temporal range: Late Eocene - Recent

Genus of ants

Pristomyrmex is a genus of ants in the subfamily Myrmicinae.

== Distribution and habitat ==
The genus is composed of 59 extant species restricted to the Old World tropics and a single extinct species, Pristomyrmex rasnitsyni, described from Scandinavian amber. Its center of diversity is the Oriental region, though species are also known from the Australian rainforests, Africa, Mauritius and Réunion. Most of the species inhabit the rainforest, forage as predators or scavengers, and tend to nest in soil, leaf litter or rotten wood.

== Species ==
- Pristomyrmex acerosus Wang, 2003
- Pristomyrmex africanus Karavaiev, 1931
- Pristomyrmex bicolor Emery, 1900
- Pristomyrmex bispinosus (Donisthorpe, 1949)
- Pristomyrmex boltoni Wang, 2003
- Pristomyrmex brevispinosus Emery, 1887
- Pristomyrmex browni Wang, 2003
- Pristomyrmex cebuensis Zettel, 2007
- Pristomyrmex coggii Emery, 1897
- Pristomyrmex collinus Wang, 2003
- Pristomyrmex costatus Wang, 2003
- Pristomyrmex cribrarius Arnold, 1926
- Pristomyrmex curvulus Wang, 2003
- Pristomyrmex distinguendus Zettel, 2006
- Pristomyrmex divisus Wang, 2003
- Pristomyrmex eduardi Forel, 1914
- Pristomyrmex erythropygus Taylor, 1968
- Pristomyrmex flatus Wang, 2003
- Pristomyrmex fossulatus (Forel, 1910)
- Pristomyrmex foveolatus Taylor, 1965
- Pristomyrmex fuscipennis (Smith, 1861)
- Pristomyrmex hamatus Xu & Zhang, 2002
- Pristomyrmex hirsutus Wang, 2003
- Pristomyrmex inermis Wang, 2003
- Pristomyrmex largus Wang, 2003
- Pristomyrmex levigatus Emery, 1897
- Pristomyrmex longispinus Wang, 2003
- Pristomyrmex longus Wang, 2003
- Pristomyrmex lucidus Emery, 1897
- Pristomyrmex mandibularis Mann, 1921
- Pristomyrmex minusculus Wang, 2003
- Pristomyrmex modestus Wang, 2003
- Pristomyrmex nitidissimus Donisthorpe, 1949
- Pristomyrmex obesus Mann, 1919
- Pristomyrmex occultus Wang, 2003
- Pristomyrmex orbiceps (Santschi, 1914)
- Pristomyrmex picteti Emery, 1893
- Pristomyrmex pollux Donisthorpe, 1944
- Pristomyrmex profundus Wang, 2003
- Pristomyrmex pulcher Wang, 2003
- Pristomyrmex punctatus (Smith, 1860)
- Pristomyrmex quadridens Emery, 1897
- Pristomyrmex quadridentatus (André, 1905)
- Pristomyrmex quindentatus Wang, 2003
- †Pristomyrmex rasnitsyni Dlussky & Radchenko, 2011
- Pristomyrmex reticulatus Donisthorpe, 1949
- Pristomyrmex rigidus Wang, 2003
- Pristomyrmex rugosus Zettel, 2006
- Pristomyrmex schoedli Zettel, 2006
- Pristomyrmex simplex Wang, 2003
- Pristomyrmex sulcatus Emery, 1895
- Pristomyrmex thoracicus Taylor, 1965
- Pristomyrmex trachylissus (Smith, 1858)
- Pristomyrmex trispinosus (Donisthorpe, 1946)
- Pristomyrmex trogor Bolton, 1981
- Pristomyrmex tsujii Sarnat & Economo, 2013
- Pristomyrmex umbripennis (Smith, 1863)
- Pristomyrmex wheeleri Taylor, 1965
- Pristomyrmex wilsoni Taylor, 1968
