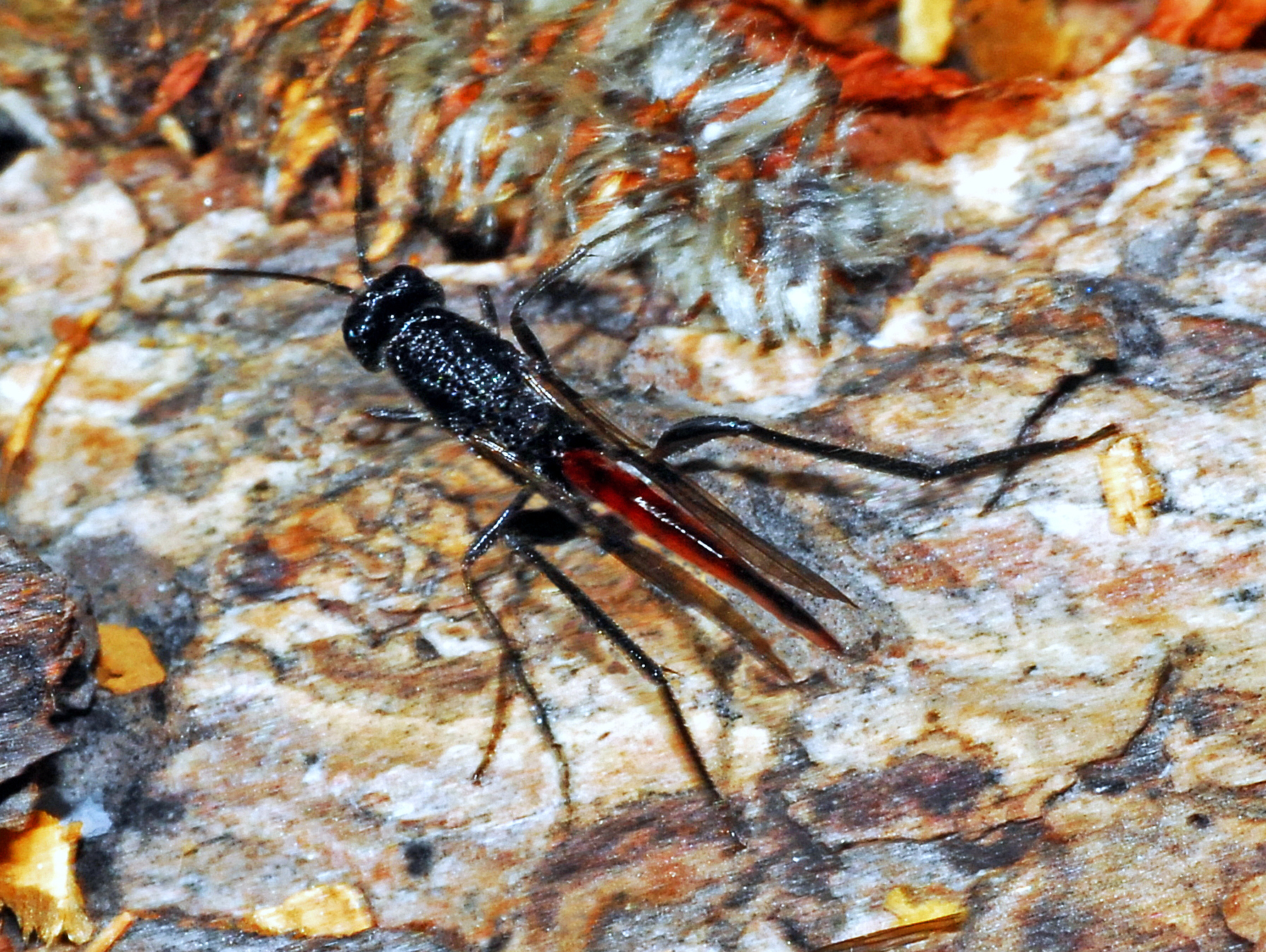
- Ibalia leucospoides

Scientific classification
- Kingdom: Animalia
- Phylum: Arthropoda
- Class: Insecta
- Order: Hymenoptera
- Family: Ibaliidae
- Genus: Ibalia; Latreille, 1802

Subgenera
- Ibalia (Ibalia) Latreille, 1802; Ibalia (Tremibalia) Kierych, 1973

Synonyms
- Sagaris Panzer, 1806

= Ibalia =

Genus of wasps

Ibalia is a genus of ibaliid wasps in the family Ibaliidae. There are about 14 described species in Ibalia. All species are parasitoids of Siricidae species, which they seek out by detecting volatiles emitted by the fungi Siricidae larvae feed on, Amylostereum.

== Species ==
These 14 species belong to the genus Ibalia:

- Ibalia anceps Say, 1824
- Ibalia aprilina Kerrich, 1973
- Ibalia arizonica Liu & Nordlander, 1992
- Ibalia hunanica Liu & Nordlander, 1994
- Ibalia jakowlewi Jacobson, 1899
- Ibalia japonica Matsumura, 1912
- Ibalia kirki Liu & Nordlander, 1992
- Ibalia leucospoides (Hochenwarth, 1785)
- Ibalia mirabilis Yasumatsu, 1941
- Ibalia montana Cresson, 1879
- Ibalia ornata Belizin, 1968
- Ibalia ruficollis Cameron, 1884
- Ibalia rufipes Cresson, 1879
- † Ibalia electra Engel & Liu, 2012
