= Eileenella =

Scientific classification
- Kingdom: Animalia
- Phylum: Arthropoda
- Clade: Pancrustacea
- Class: Insecta
- Order: Hymenoptera
- Family: Ibaliidae
- Genus: Eileenella; Fergusson, 1992
- Species: E. catherinae

Binomial name
- Eileenella catherinae Fergusson, 1992

Genus of wasps

Eileenella is a genus of parasitoid wasps in the family Ibaliidae, containing the single species Eileenella catherinae from Papua New Guinea.
