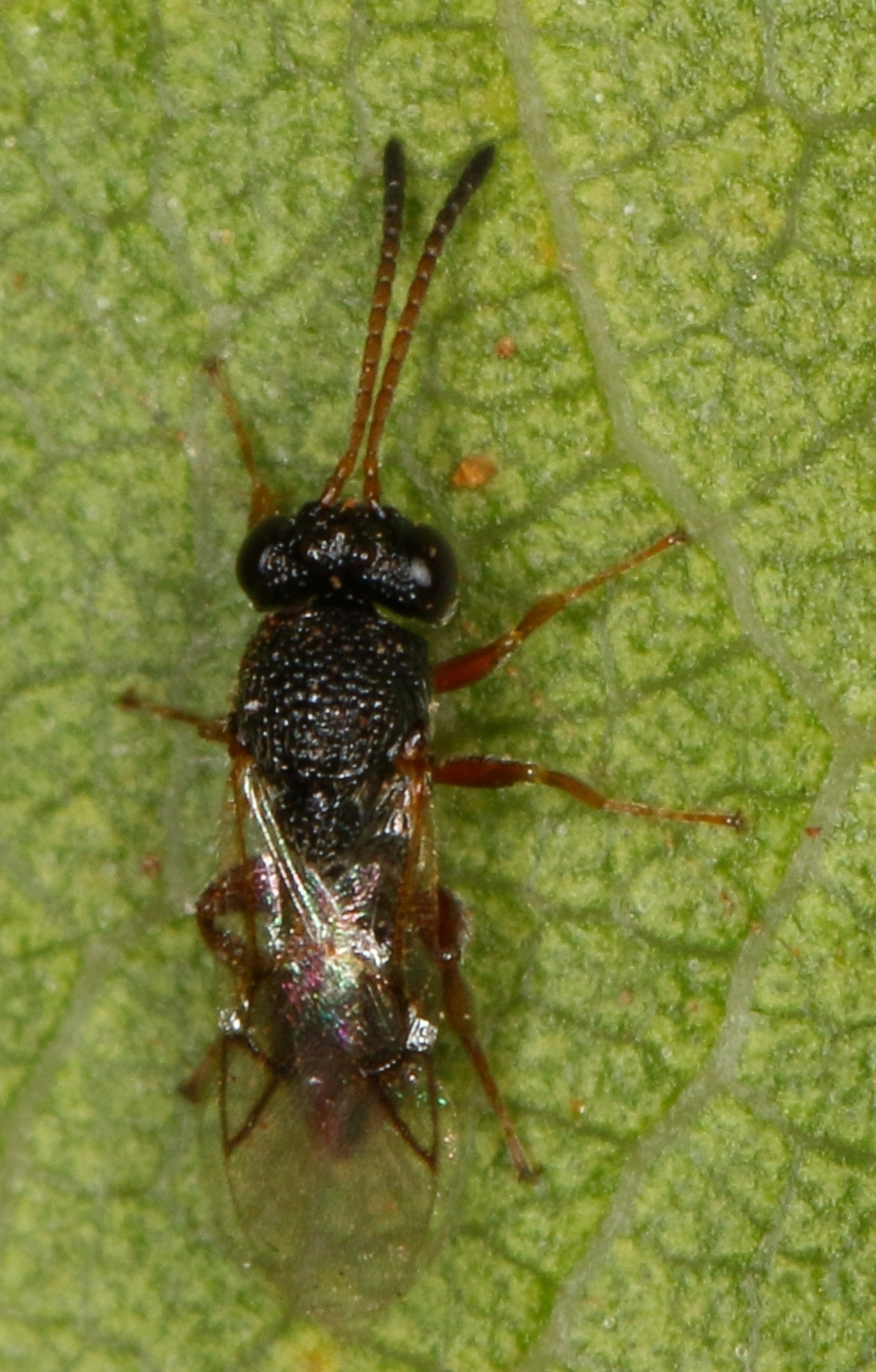
- Paramblynotus sp.

Scientific classification
- Kingdom: Animalia
- Phylum: Arthropoda
- Clade: Pancrustacea
- Class: Insecta
- Order: Hymenoptera
- Suborder: Apocrita
- Infraorder: Proctotrupomorpha
- Superfamily: Cynipoidea
- Family: Liopteridae; Ashmead, 1895

Subfamilies
- See text

= Liopteridae =

Family of wasps

Liopteridae is a family of wood-boring parasitoid wasps. They occur worldwide with concentrations in the African Tropics. These insects have a petiolate abdomen. There are ten genera and more than 140 species known.

== Classification ==
- Subfamily Dallatorrellinae (Australasian, Oriental)
  - Genus Mesocynips Cameron, 1903 (Oriental)
  - Genus Dallatorrella Kieffer, 1911 (Australasian, Oriental)
- Subfamily Mayrellinae (Worldwide)
  - Genus Kiefferiella Ashmead, 1903 (Nearctic)
  - Genus Paramblynotus Cameron, 1908 (Worldwide)
- Subfamily Liopterinae (Neotropical)
  - Genus Liopteron Perty, 1833
  - Genus Peras Westwood, 1837
  - Genus Pseudibalia Kieffer, 1911
- Subfamily Oberthuerellinae (Afrotropical)
  - Genus Oberthuerella Saussure, 1890
  - Genus Tessmannella Hedicke, 1912
  - Genus Xenocynips Kieffer, 1910
