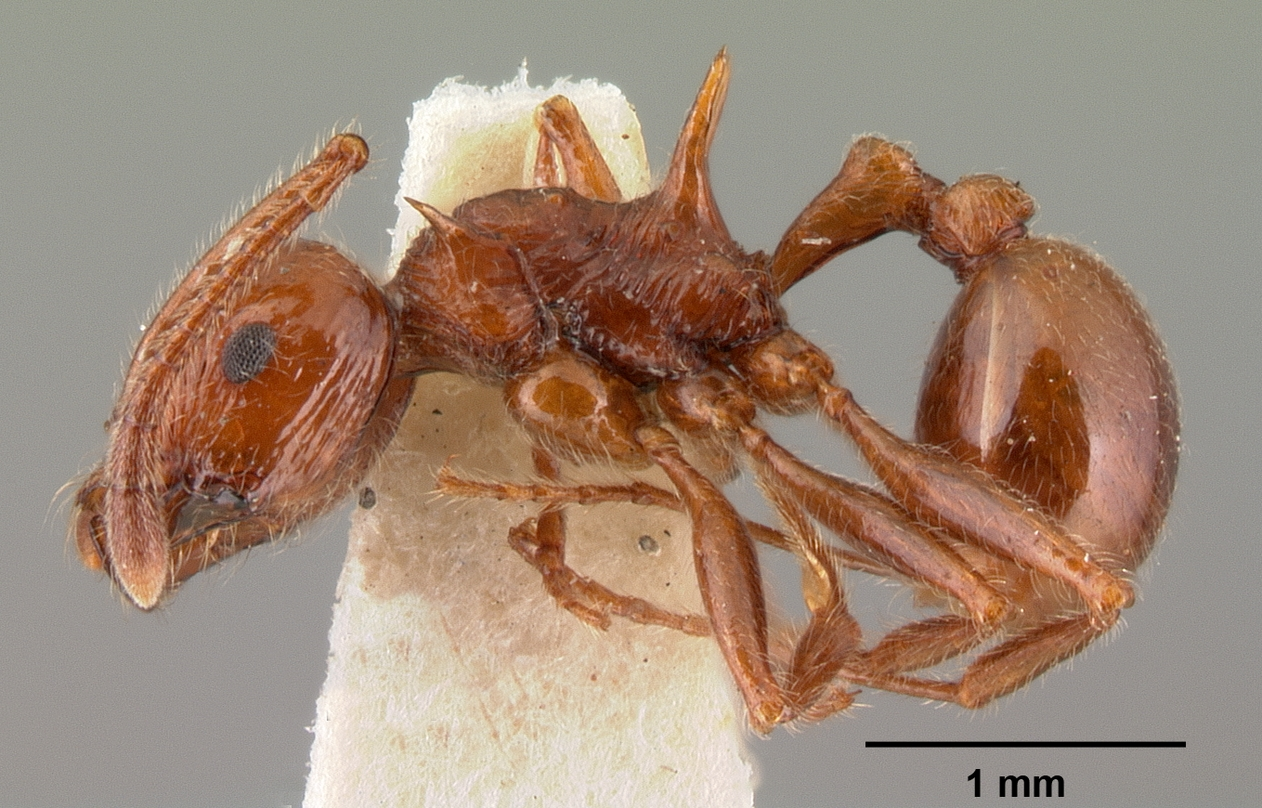
- Pristomyrmex bispinosus worker from Mauritius

Scientific classification
- Kingdom: Animalia
- Phylum: Arthropoda
- Class: Insecta
- Order: Hymenoptera
- Family: Formicidae
- Subfamily: Myrmicinae
- Genus: Pristomyrmex
- Species: P. bispinosus

Binomial name
- Pristomyrmex bispinosus Donisthorpe, 1949

= Pristomyrmex bispinosus =

Species of ant

Pristomyrmex bispinosus is a species of ant in the subfamily Myrmicinae. It was described by Donisthorpe in 1949.
