= Sigmund von Hochenwarth =

Austrian botanist and entomologist

Sigmund von Hochenwarth (1745, Stein, Krain – 22 April 1822, Linz) was an Austrian botanist and entomologist. von Hochenwarth was a Domherr in Gurk, Carinthia. He described Ibalia leucospoides.

He wrote:

- Hochenwarth, S. von 1785, Beyträge zur Insectengeschichte. Schriften der Berlinischen Gesellschaft Naturforschender Freunde, Berlin 6:334–360, plates 7–8
- Hochenwarth, S. von 1785, Beyträge zur Insectengeschichte. Bibl. Ent. 1:176
- Reiner, J. and Hohenwarth, S. 1792–1812: Botanische Reisen nach einigen Oberkärntnerischen und benachbarten Alpen unternommen ... nebst entomologischen Beiträgen. - Klagenfurt, Walliser 2 Bände: ?
