= Serphitidae =

Serphitidae Temporal range: Barremian–Campanian

Scientific classification
- Kingdom: Animalia
- Phylum: Arthropoda
- Clade: Pancrustacea
- Class: Insecta
- Order: Hymenoptera
- Suborder: Apocrita
- Infraorder: Proctotrupomorpha
- Superfamily: †Serphitoidea
- Family: †Serphitidae; Brues, 1937

Subfamilies
- See below

Extinct family of wasps

Serphitidae is a family of microscopic parasitic wasps known from the Cretaceous period.

== Taxonomy ==
This family was described in 1937 by the American entomologist Charles Thomas Brues to classify a fossil insect caught in an amber piece from Canada. The species was named Serphites paradoxus. After that, more genera were described and included in this family, like Archaeromma and Distylopus by the Japanese entomologist Hiroshi Yoshimoto in 1975, from fossils also found in Canadian amber, and Aposerphites, Microserphites and new species of Serphites in 1979 by the Russian entomologist Mikhail Vasilievich Kozlov and Alexandr Rasnitsyn, from Siberian amber. Serphitidae is placed with another extinct family, Archaeoserphitidae as members of the superfamily Serphitoidea, Serphitoidea in turn is the sister group of the superfamily Mymarommatoidea, the only living family of which is Mymarommatidae. The clade containing both superfamilies is named Bipetiolarida, which is placed within the Proctotrupomorpha.

- Microserphitinae Engel, 2015
  - Microserphites Kozlov & Rasnitsyn, 1979
    - †Microserphites parvulus Kozlov and Rasnitsyn, 1979 - Cenomanian, Taimyr Amber, Russia
    - †Microserphites soplaensis Ortega-Blanco et al., 2011 - Early Albian, Spanish amber (El Soplao Amber), Las Penosas Formation, Spain
    - Microserphites libanensis Rasnitsyn et al. 2022 Barremian, Lebanese amber
- Leptoserphites Rasnitsyn et al. 2022 Barremian, Lebanese amber
  - Leptoserphites pabloi Rasnitsyn et al. 2022 Barremian, Lebanese amber
  - Leptoserphites irae Rasnitsyn et al. 2022 Barremian, Lebanese amber
- Serphitinae Brues, 1937
  - Aposerphites Kozlov & Rasnitsyn, 1979
    - †Aposerphites angustus Ortega-Blanco et al., 2011 - Upper Albian, Álava amber, Escucha Formation, Spain
    - †Aposerphites solox Kozlov & Rasnitsyn, 1979 - Cenomanian, Taimyr Amber, Russia
  - Burserphites Herbert & McKellar, 2021
    - †Burserphites applanatus Herbert & McKellar, 2021 - Cenomanian, Burmese amber, Myanmar
    - †Burserphites myanmarensis Herbert & McKellar, 2021 - Cenomanian, Burmese amber, Myanmar
  - Jubaserphites McKellar & Engel, 2011
    - †Jubaserphites ethani McKellar & Engel, 2011 - Upper Campanian, Canadian amber, Grassy Lake locality, Canada
  - Mesoserphites Herbert & McKellar, 2021
    - †Mesoserphites annulus Herbert & McKellar, 2021 - Cenomanian, Burmese amber, Myanmar
    - †Mesoserphites engeli Herbert & McKellar, 2021 - Cenomanian, Burmese amber, Myanmar
    - †Mesoserphites giganteus Herbert & McKellar, 2021 - Cenomanian, Burmese amber, Myanmar
    - †Mesoserphites scutatus Herbert & McKellar, 2021 - Cenomanian, Burmese amber, Myanmar
    - †Mesoserphites viraneacapitis Herbert & McKellar, 2021 - Cenomanian, Burmese amber, Myanmar
  - Serphites Brues, 1937
    - †Serphites bruesi McKellar & Engel, 2011 - Campanian, Canadian amber, Canada
    - †Serphites dux Kozlov & Rasnitsyn, 1979 - Cenomanian, Taimyr amber, Russia
    - †Serphites fannyae Engel & Perrichot, 2014 - Turonian, Vendée amber, France
    - †Serphites gigas Kozlov and Rasnitsyn, 1979 - Cenomanian, Taimyr amber, Russia
    - †Serphites hynemani McKellar & Engel, 2011 - Campanian, Canadian amber, Canada
    - †Serphites kuzminae McKellar & Engel, 2011 - Campanian, Canadian amber, Canada
    - †Serphites lamiak Ortega-Blanco et al., 2011 - Upper Albian, Álava amber, Escucha Formation, Spain
    - †Serphites naveskinae Engel & Grimaldi, 2011 - Turonian, New Jersey amber, United States
    - †Serphites paradoxus Brues, 1937 - Campanian, Canadian amber, Canada
    - †Serphites pygmaeus McKellar & Engel, 2011 - Campanian, Canadian amber, Canada
    - †Serphites raritanensis Engel & Grimaldi, 2011 - Turonian, New Jersey Amber, United States
    - †Serphites silban Ortega-Blanco et al., 2011 - Upper Albian, San Just amber, Escucha Formation, Spain
  - Buserphites Herbert & McKellar, 2022 Cenomanian, Burmese amber, Myanmar,
    - B. applanatus Herbert & McKellar, 2022
    - B. myanmarensis Herbert & McKellar, 2022
  - Mesoserphites Herbert & McKellar, 2022 Cenomanian, Burmese amber, Myanmar,
    - M. annulus Herbert & McKellar, 2022
    - M. giganteus Herbert & McKellar, 2022
    - M. engeli Herbert & McKellar, 2022
    - M. scutatus Herbert & McKellar, 2022
    - M. viraneacapiti Herbert & McKellar, 2022
- Supraserphitinae Rasnitsyn & Öhm-Kühnle, 2019
  - Supraserphites Rasnitsyn & Öhm-Kühnle, 2019
    - †Supraserphites draculi Rasnitsyn & Öhm-Kühnle, 2019 - Cenomanian, Burmese amber, Myanmar
    - †Supraserphites sidorchukae Rasnitsyn & Öhm-Kühnle, 2019 - Cenomanian, Burmese amber, Myanmar
    - †Supraserphites margritae Rasnitsyn & Öhm-Kühnle, 2020 - Cenomanian, Burmese amber, Myanmar
    - †Supraserphites vorontsovi Rasnitsyn & Öhm-Kühnle, 2020 - Cenomanian, Burmese amber, Myanmar
