= Austronia rubrithorax =

Scientific classification
- Kingdom: Animalia
- Phylum: Arthropoda
- Clade: Pancrustacea
- Class: Insecta
- Order: Hymenoptera
- Family: Austroniidae
- Genus: Austronia
- Species: A. rubrithorax

Binomial name
- Austronia rubrithorax Riek, E.F. 1955

Species of parasatoid wasp in Australia

Austronia rubrithorax is a small species of parasitoid wasp in the family Austroniidae. It is endemic to moist forests of southern Australia and Tasmania.

== Description and identification ==
First described by Riek, E.F in 1955, A. rubrithorax is around 4–6 mm (0.16–0.24 in) in length, while females also possess a partially retracted oviposter. The head and abdomen are a darker brown while the thorax and legs are a brighter copper red color.
