= Ibalia anceps =

Scientific classification
- Kingdom: Animalia
- Phylum: Arthropoda
- Class: Insecta
- Order: Hymenoptera
- Family: Ibaliidae
- Genus: Ibalia
- Species: I. anceps

Binomial name
- Ibalia anceps Say, 1824

Synonyms
- Ibalia fasciipennis Kieffer, 1909; Ibalia maculipennis Haldeman, 1846; Ibalia scalpellator Westwood, 1837

Species of wasp

Ibalia anceps is a species of ibaliid wasp in the family Ibaliidae. It is found in North America. It is a parasitoid of Tremex columba.
