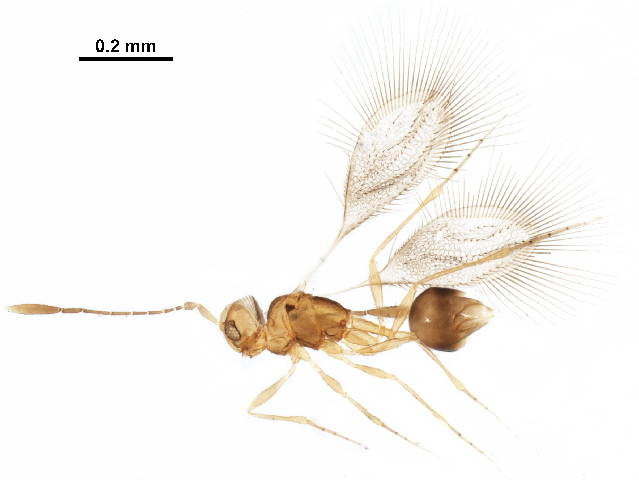

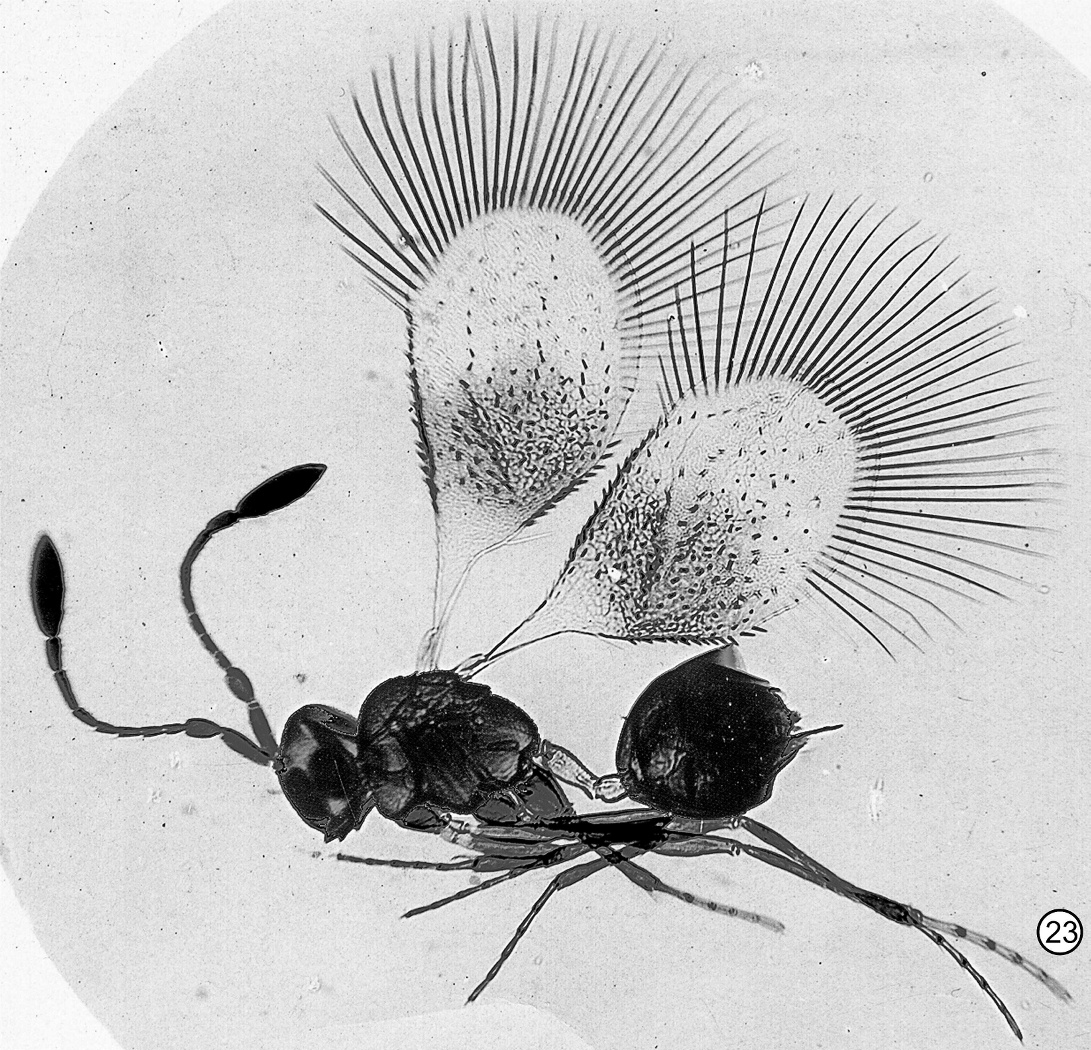
- Specimens of Mymaromella mira

Scientific classification
- Kingdom: Animalia
- Phylum: Arthropoda
- Clade: Pancrustacea
- Class: Insecta
- Order: Hymenoptera
- Superfamily: Mymarommatoidea
- Family: Mymarommatidae; Debauche, 1948

Genera
- †Archaeromma Yoshimoto, 1975; Mymaromella Girault, 1931; Mymaromma Girault, 1920† †Palaeomymar Meunier, 1901; Zealaromma Gibson, Read and Huber, 2007

= Mymarommatidae =

Mymarommatidae Temporal range: Albian–Present

Family of wasps

The Mymarommatidae are a very small family of microscopic parasitic wasps. Only about half of the known species are living taxa (the others are fossils), but they are found worldwide.

Little is known about the biology of these insects, but because of their size, and simple ovipositors, entomologists assumed they were idiobiont parasitoids on the eggs of insects, similar to other extremely small parasitic wasps such as fairyflies. Psocoptera, long suspected as their hosts based on circumstantial evidence, was confirmed to be the hosts of at least some mymarommatids in 2022, after specimens of Mymaromma menehune were observed emerging from the eggs of a member of the pscopteran family Lepidopsocidae. They are placed in the superfamily Mymarommatoidea, with a number of extinct families known from Cretaceous amber. Mymarommatids are distinguished by the presence of a pleated (folded) membrane connecting the front and back halves of the head extending from the mandible to the top of the head, which is presumably expanded by muscle or hydrostatic pressure, likely to aid in breaking open the walls of the egg capsule. Specimens are often found in leaf litter and are usually rare, but occasionally appear in significant numbers.

== Classification ==
As taxonomists have examined this group more closely, they have become less certain about which other group of wasps represents the nearest living relatives of the Mymarommatidae. In recent years, it has been proposed that the nearest relatives of Mymarommatoidea are the extinct Serphitoidea, including the family Serphitidae, and therefore claim the Mymarommatidae are essentially "living fossils".

†Palaeomymar is known from a single species (P. succini Meunier) from Eocene aged Baltic amber.

†Archaeromma is known from 10 species spread across Laurasia during the Cretaceous dating from the Albian to the Campanian.

Mymaromma has 11 described extant species.

Mymaromella has 6 described extant species. Another species of Mymaromella, M. duerrenfeldi, is known from Miocene amber in Sicily.

Zealaromma has two extant species: Z. insulare and Z. valentinei. Both species are known from New Zealand.
