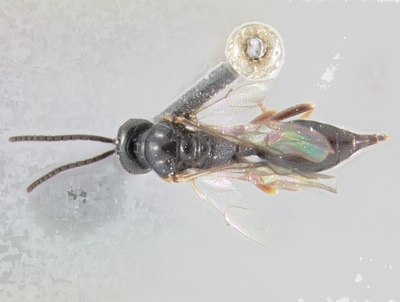

Scientific classification
- Kingdom: Animalia
- Phylum: Arthropoda
- Clade: Pancrustacea
- Class: Insecta
- Order: Hymenoptera
- Family: Austroniidae
- Genus: Austronia
- Species: A. nitida

Binomial name
- Austronia nitida Riek, 1955

= Austronia nitida =

Species of wasp

Austronia nitida is a species of small parasitoid wasp in the family Austroniidae. Like other species in Austroniidae A. nitida is endemic to the moist forests of southern Australia and Tasmania.

== Description and identification ==
A. nitida was first described by E.F. Riek in 1955 with the holotype being held at Division of Entomology Museum, Commonwealth Scientific and Industrial Research Organisation (CSIRO), and the allotype being held at the South Australian Museum. The species is around 4–6 mm (0.16–0.24 in) in length. Females possess a partially retracted oviposter. The main body is a shining black, while the legs and tegula are partially red.
