= Edgar Riek =

Australian entomologist and invertebrate zoologist

Edgar Frederick Riek OAM (1920–2016) was an Australian entomologist and invertebrate zoologist known for his research on fossil insects and the taxonomy of freshwater crayfish. He later became known as prominent viticulturist and winemaker. Affiliated with the CSIRO for over 30 years, he wrote the first pocket field guide to Australian insects, described over 230 species, and is commemorated in the names of over 80 species. After retiring from the CSIRO he became a noted figure in the Australian wine industry, co-founding the Canberra and District Vignerons Association and receiving the Order of Australia Medal (1996) for his work.

Edgar Riek was born 1 May 1920 in Napier, New Zealand, to Australian parents. He was raised in Caboolture, Queensland, attended Brisbane Grammar School, and entered the University of Queensland in 1939 where he worked as an assistant in the Geology Department. He majored in Geology and Biology, earned a B.S. from the University of Queensland in 1942, and taught zoology there from 1943 to 1945 while earning a M.S. on freshwater animals of Queensland, awarded 1946. In 1945 he joined the Council of Scientific and Industrial Research, a precursor to the CSIRO, as an assistant in the Division of Economic Entomology in Canberra. He retired in 1976.
