= Petiole (insect anatomy) =

Insect waist anatomy term

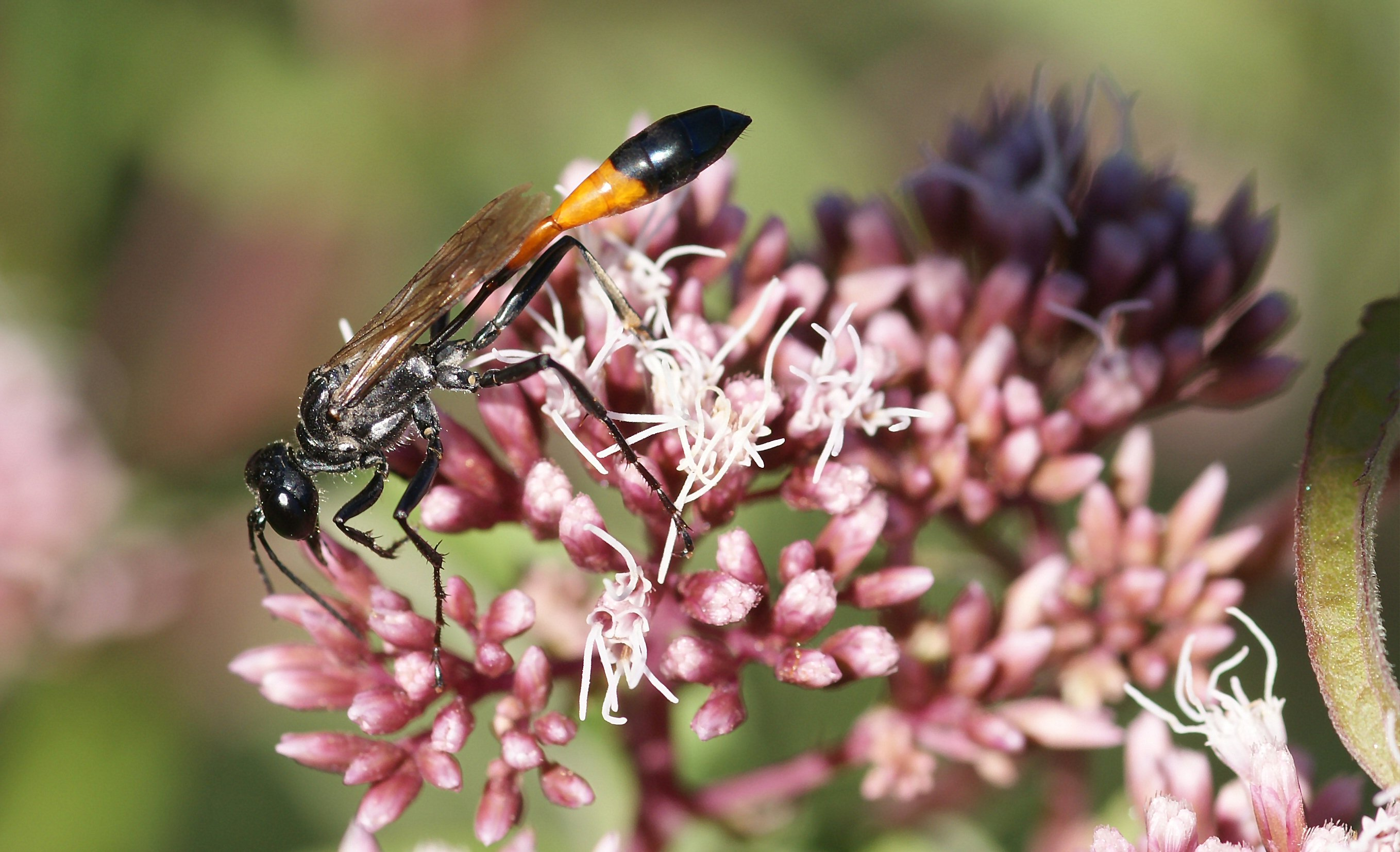
The sand wasp Ammophila sabulosa has an exceptionally long petiole.

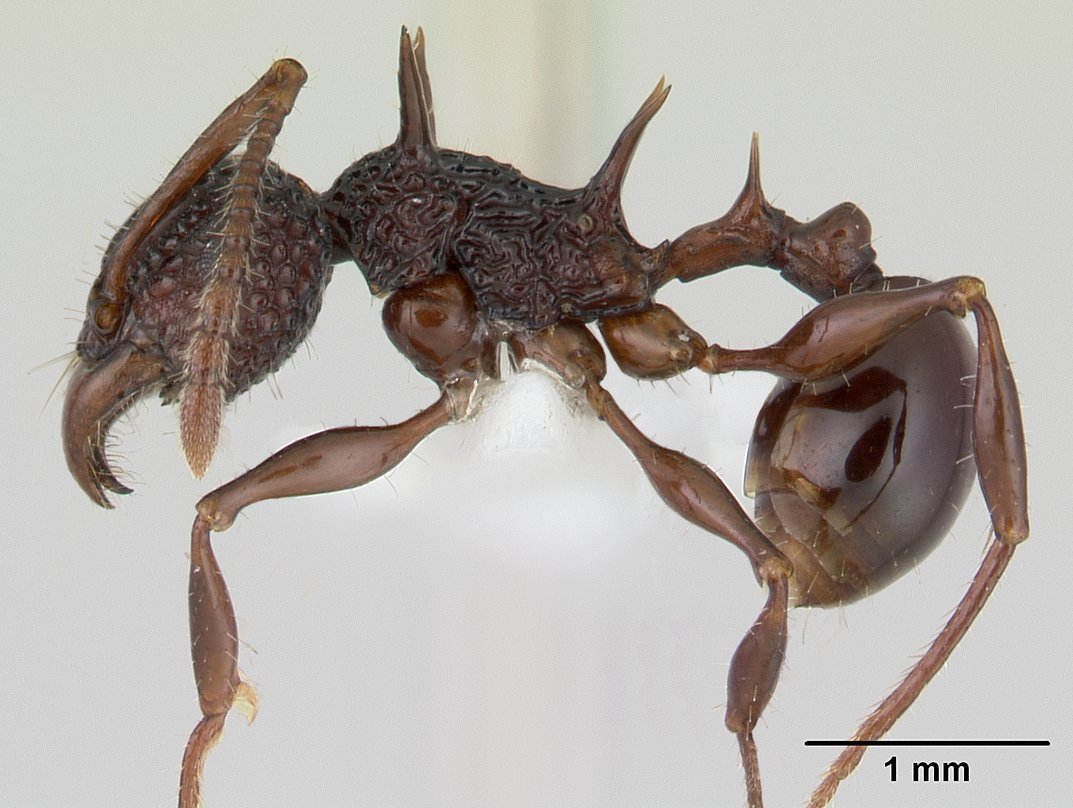
This Acanthomyrmex ant has a petiole and postpetiole

In entomology, petiole is the narrow waist of some hymenopteran insects, especially ants, bees, and wasps in the suborder Apocrita. The petiole can consist of either one or two segments, a characteristic that separates major subfamilies of ants.

== Structure ==
The term 'petiole' is most commonly used to refer to the constricted first (and sometimes second) metasomal (posterior) segment of members of the hymenopteran suborder Apocrita (ants, bees, and wasps). It is sometimes also used to refer to other insects with similar body shapes, where the metasomal base is constricted. The petiole is occasionally called a pedicel, but in entomology, that term is more correctly reserved for the second segment of the antenna; while in arachnology, 'pedicel' is the accepted term to define the constriction between the cephalothorax and abdomen of spiders.

The plump portion of the abdomen posterior to the petiole (and postpetiole in the Myrmicinae) is called the gaster.

The structure of the petiole is an easy way to visually classify ants, because the major subfamilies of Formicidae have structural differences: some ants have two-segmented petioles, while others have a single-segmented petiole.

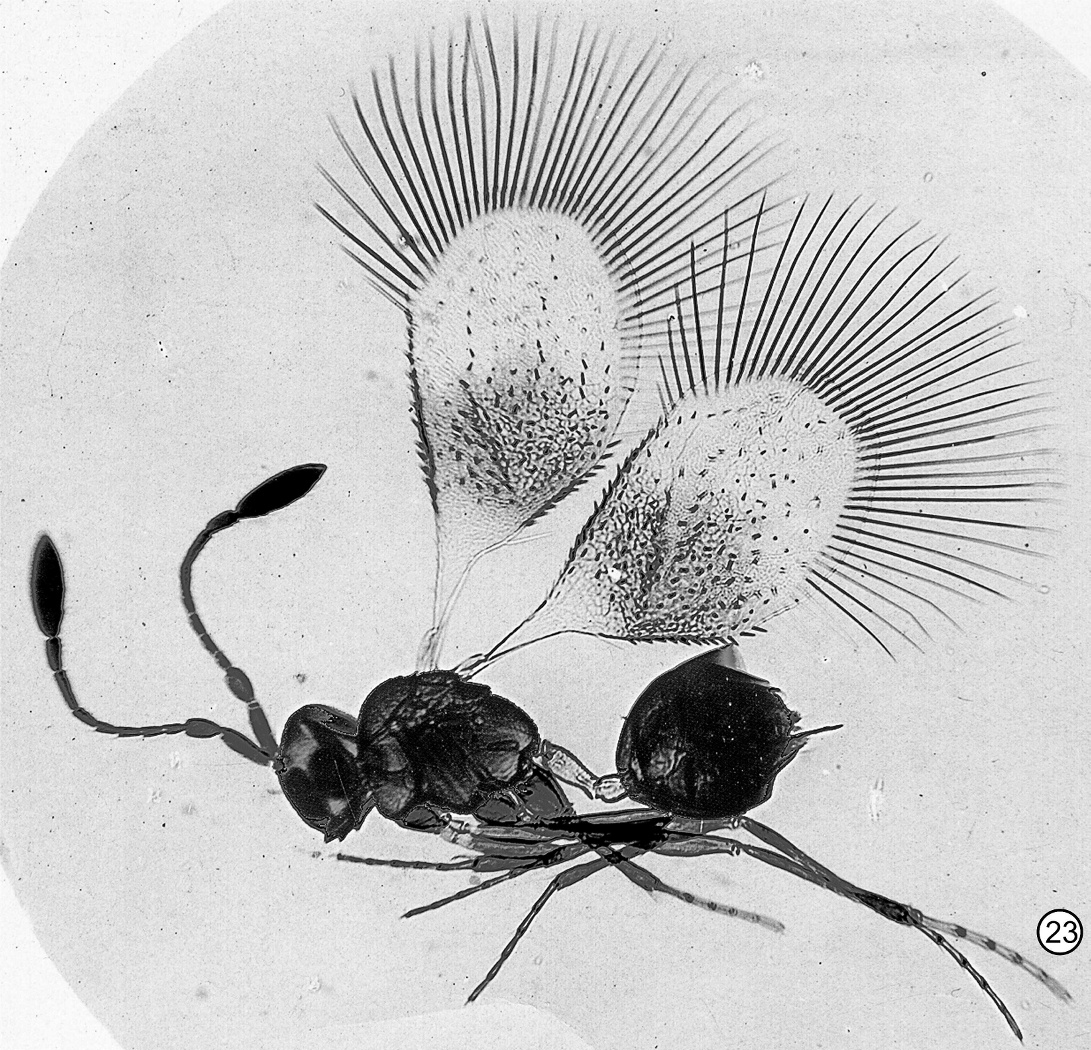
A mymarommatid wasp with a visibly 2-segmented petiole

Certain wasps also possess a two-segmented petiole, notably extant wasps of the family Mymarommatidae. The fossil taxon Rasnitsevania (Praeaulacidae) has a two-segmented petiole.

== Other uses ==
Petiole may also be used in the context of wing veins, where a wing cell that is ordinarily four-sided is reduced to a triangle with a stalk (the cell thus being 'petiolate'). Wings themselves may originate on structures termed petioles, here referring to a basal portion of the wing that forms a narrow stalk, seen in certain crane flies and damselflies.

The stalk at the base of paper wasp nests is sometimes also called a petiole, or pedicel.

== See also ==
- Propodeum
