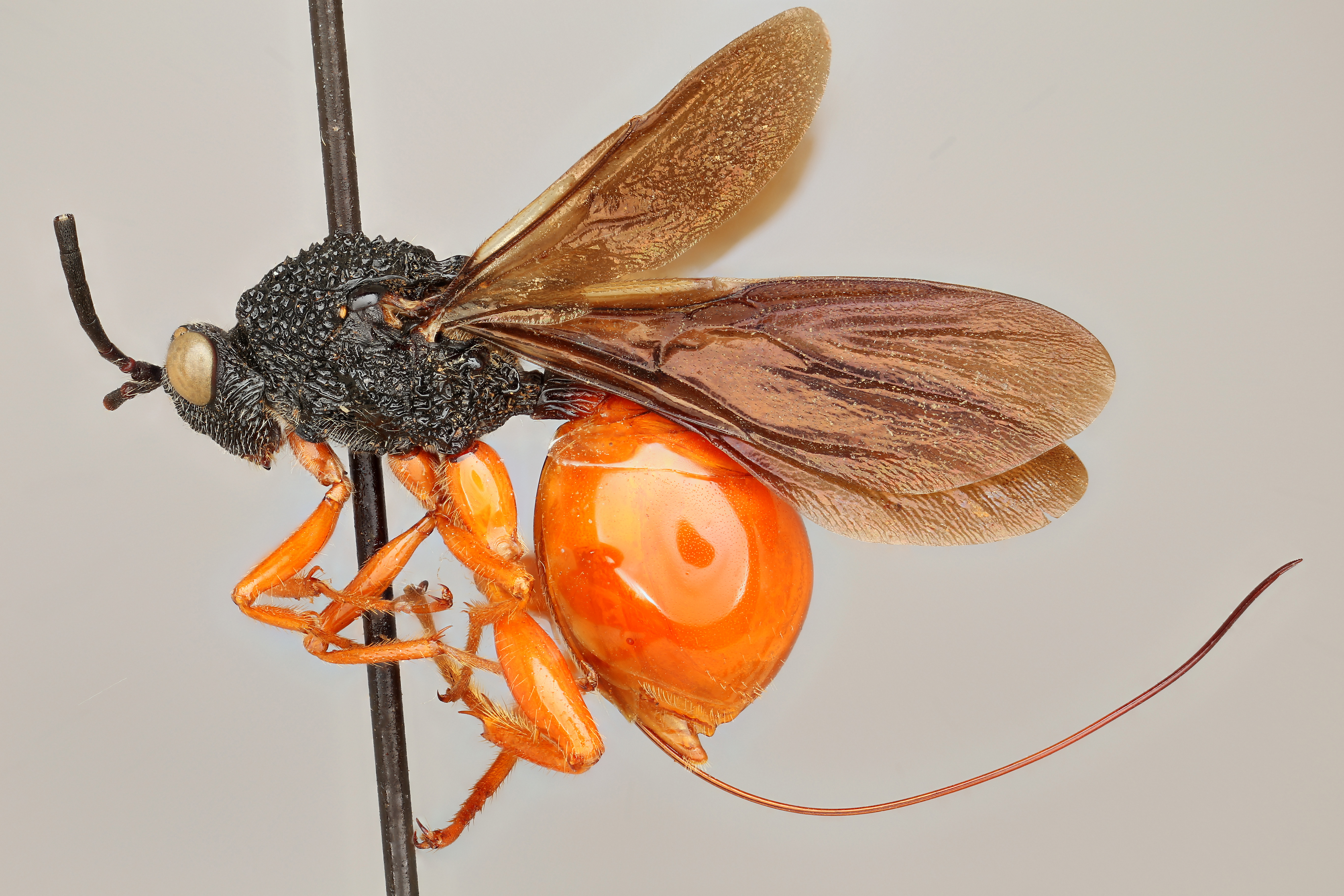
- Oberthuerella lenticularis (Liopteridae, Cynipoidea)
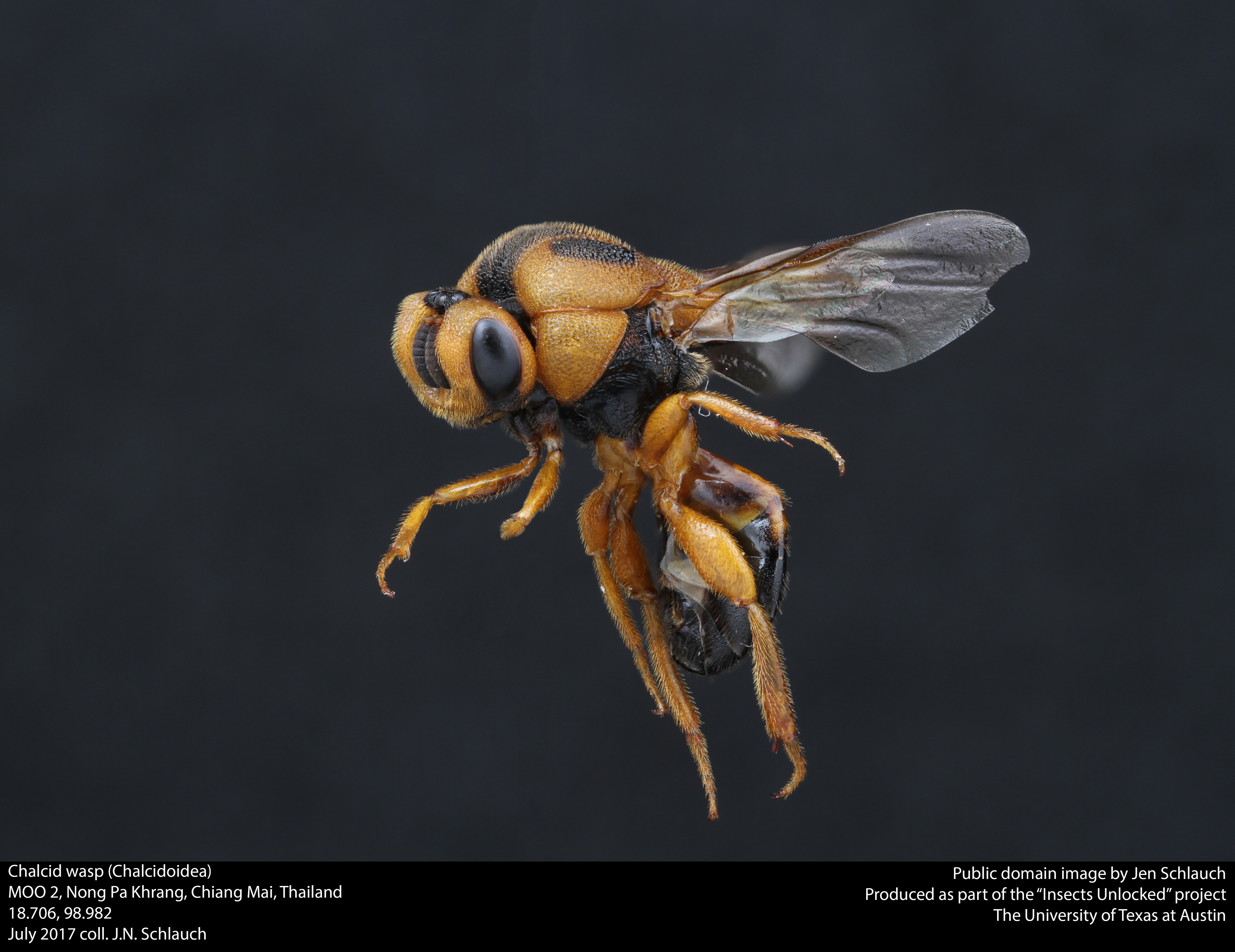
- Philomides sp. (Perilampidae, Chalcidoidea)

Scientific classification
- Kingdom: Animalia
- Phylum: Arthropoda
- Clade: Pancrustacea
- Class: Insecta
- Order: Hymenoptera
- Suborder: Apocrita
- Infraorder: Proctotrupomorpha; Rasnitsyn, 1988

Superfamilies and Families
- Cynipoidea; Chalcidoidea; Diaprioidea; Proctotrupoidea; Platygastroidea; †Jurapriidae; †Trupochalcididae; †Chalscelionidae; Bipetiolarida; Mymarommatoidea; †Serphitoidea; †Archaeoserphitidae; †Serphitidae

= Proctotrupomorpha =

Proctotrupomorpha Temporal range: Middle Jurassic–Present

Infraorder of wasps

Proctotrupomorpha is a major subgrouping of the Apocrita within the Hymenoptera, containing mainly small parasitic wasps. It contains the major groupings of Chalcidoidea, Diaprioidea, Proctotrupoidea, Cynipoidea and Platygastroidea, as well as the small Mymarommatoidea, and extinct groups like the Serphitoidea. It is well supported by both morphological and genetic evidence, although relationships among the superfamilies are still somewhat in flux.

== See also ==
Families and superfamilies of the Apocrita
