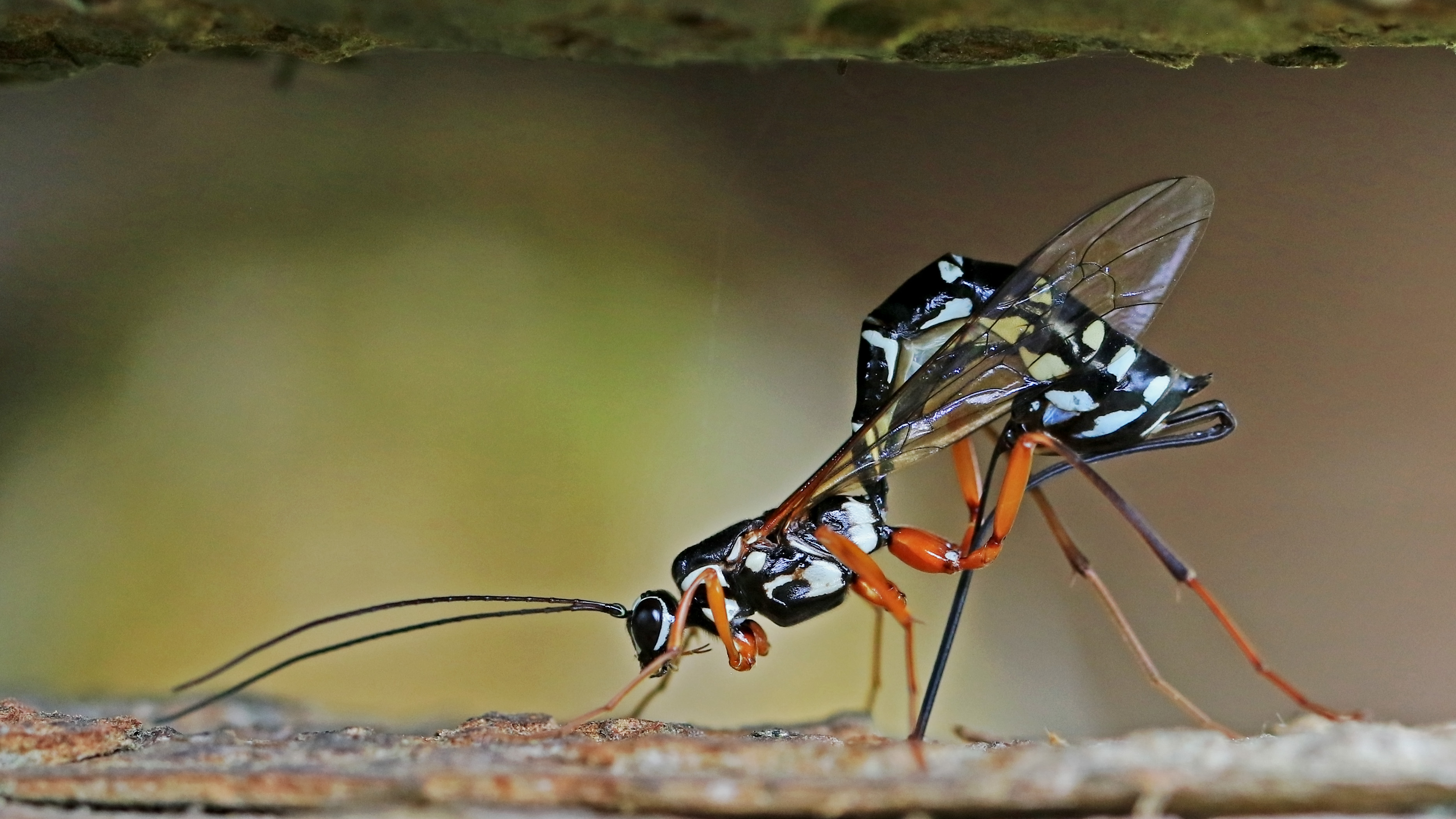
- Rhyssa persuasoria – Female
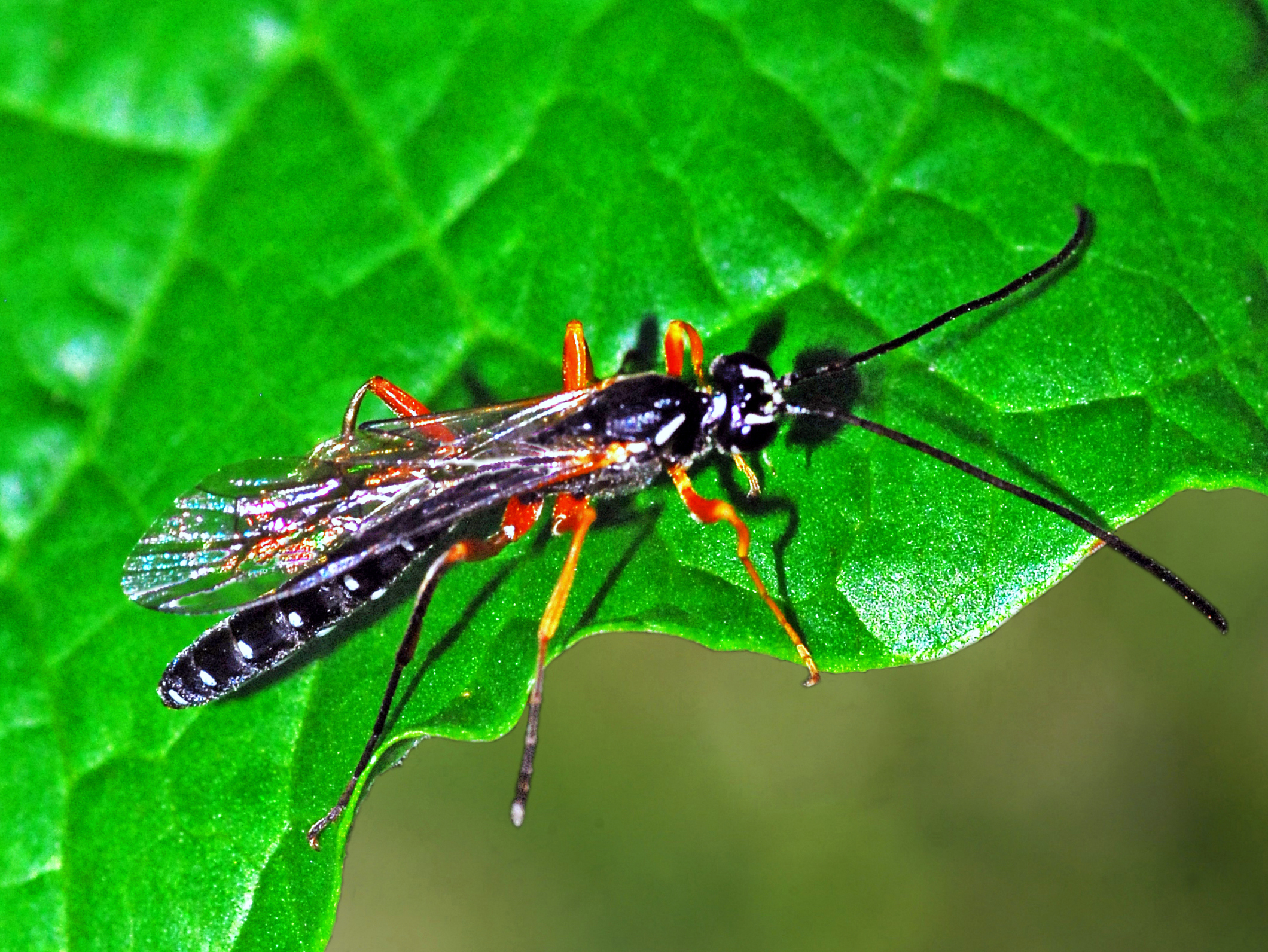
- Male

Scientific classification
- Kingdom: Animalia
- Phylum: Arthropoda
- Class: Insecta
- Order: Hymenoptera
- Family: Ichneumonidae
- Genus: Rhyssa
- Species: R. persuasoria

Binomial name
- Rhyssa persuasoria (Linnaeus, 1758)

Synonyms
- Ichneumon matutinus Christ, 1791; Rhyssa gloriosa Rudow, 1889; Rhyssa marginalis Brulle, 1846; Rhyssa matutina (Christ, 1791)

= Rhyssa persuasoria =

Species of wasp

Rhyssa persuasoria, also known as the sabre wasp, is a species belonging to the family Ichneumonidae subfamily Rhyssinae. Members of this subfamily, including those of Rhyssa and the allied Megarhyssa, are also known collectively as giant ichneumonid wasps or giant ichneumons.

== Subspecies ==
There are four described subspecies of Rhyssa persuasoria:

- Rhyssa persuasoria himalayensis Wilkinson, 1927
- Rhyssa persuasoria nepalensis Kamath & Gupta, 1972
- Rhyssa persuasoria nigrofacialis Meyer, 1922
- Rhyssa persuasoria persuasoria (Linnaeus, 1758)

== Distribution and habitat ==
This species is present in most of Europe (Austria, Belgium, Great Britain, Russia, Czech Republic, European Turkey, Finland, France, Germany, Greece, Hungary, Iceland, Ireland, Italy, Latvia, Lithuania, Norway, Poland, Portugal, Romania, Slovakia, Spain, Sweden, Switzerland, The Netherlands and Yugoslavia), in the Australasian realm, in the Near East, in the Nearctic realm, in North Africa, and in the Indomalayan realm. These wasps normally occur in coniferous or mixed woodland.

== Description ==
Rhyssa persuasoria is one of the largest ichneumon wasps in Europe. The length of adults varies from about 10–20 millimetres (0.39–0.79 in) in males up to 20–40 millimetres (0.79–1.57 in) in the females, plus about 20–40 millimetres (0.79–1.57 in) of the ovipositor. These ichneumon wasps have a thin black body, several whitish spots on the head, thorax, and abdomen and reddish legs. The antennae are long and thin. Females have a long ovipositor, which they use when laying eggs. The length of the ovipositor exceeds the body length.

This species is rather similar to Rhyssa amoena Gravenhorst, 1829.

== Biology ==
Adults can mainly be encountered from July through August, especially in paths and clearings of coniferous forests. They feed on carbohydrates such as sugar and starch, which are obtained, for example, by feasting on honeydew or pine needles. Flowers are not visited.

Female of this parasitic species drills deep into wood by its hair thin ovipositor (terebra) and lays its eggs on larvae living deep in timber (up to 40 mm), which become a food supply and an incubator for the progeny, until it is fully grown. This species has one generation a year (univoltine). Larvae overwinter in the wood, pupating the next spring and emerging from the wood as adults.

Main hosts of Rhyssa persuasoria are the larvae of horntails or wood wasps (Urocerus gigas, Siricidae species, a type of xylophagous sawfly), as well as larvae of longhorn beetles (Spondylis buprestoides, Monochamus sutor) and great capricorn beetle (Cerambyx cerdo). In North America, its main hosts are Sirex areolatus and Syntexis libocedrii.

== Gallery ==
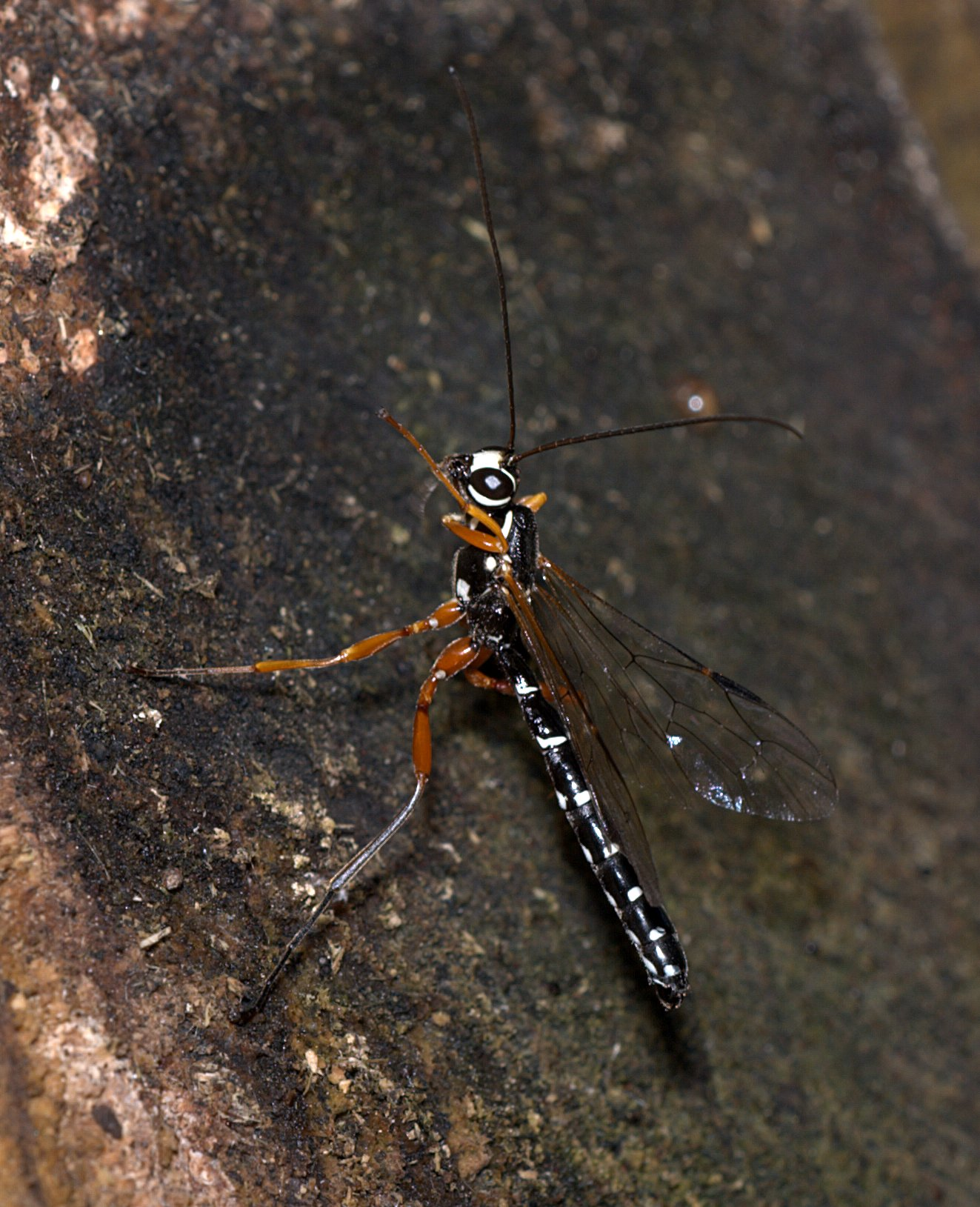
Rhyssa persuasoria, male

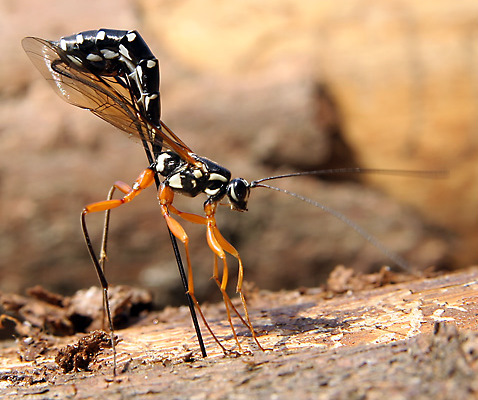
Female laying eggs

Video clip. Female laying eggs

== Bibliography ==
- Grandi G., 1951 – Introduzione allo studio dell’Entomologia. Ediz. Agricole, Bologna
- Grujic, D. - The life and development of the ichneumon Rhyssa persuasoria, a parasite of Siricidae – Journal Zastita Bilja 1970 Vol. 21 No. 107 pp. 63–70
- J. P. Spradberya1 and D. A. Ratkowsky - An analysis of geographical variation in the parasitoid Rhyssa persuasoria (L.) (Hymenoptera, Ichneumonidae) - Bulletin of Entomological Research, Cambridge University Press 1974
- David Burnie, Animali-Volume 1, Londra, Dorling Kindersley Limited, 2001.
- K. L. Taylor: Studies with Sirex noctilio (Hymenoptera, Siricidae) and its parasites that illustrate the importance of evaluation biological control events. Acta Öcologica Vol.1, no.2, S. 181–187, 1980
- Linnaeus, C. von (1758) Systema naturae per regna tria naturae, secundum classes, ordines, genera, species cum characteribus, differentiis, synonymis locis. Tomus I. Editio decima, reformata., Laurnetii Salvii, Holmiae. 824 pp. (A photographic facsimile by British Museum (Natural History), London. 1956.)
