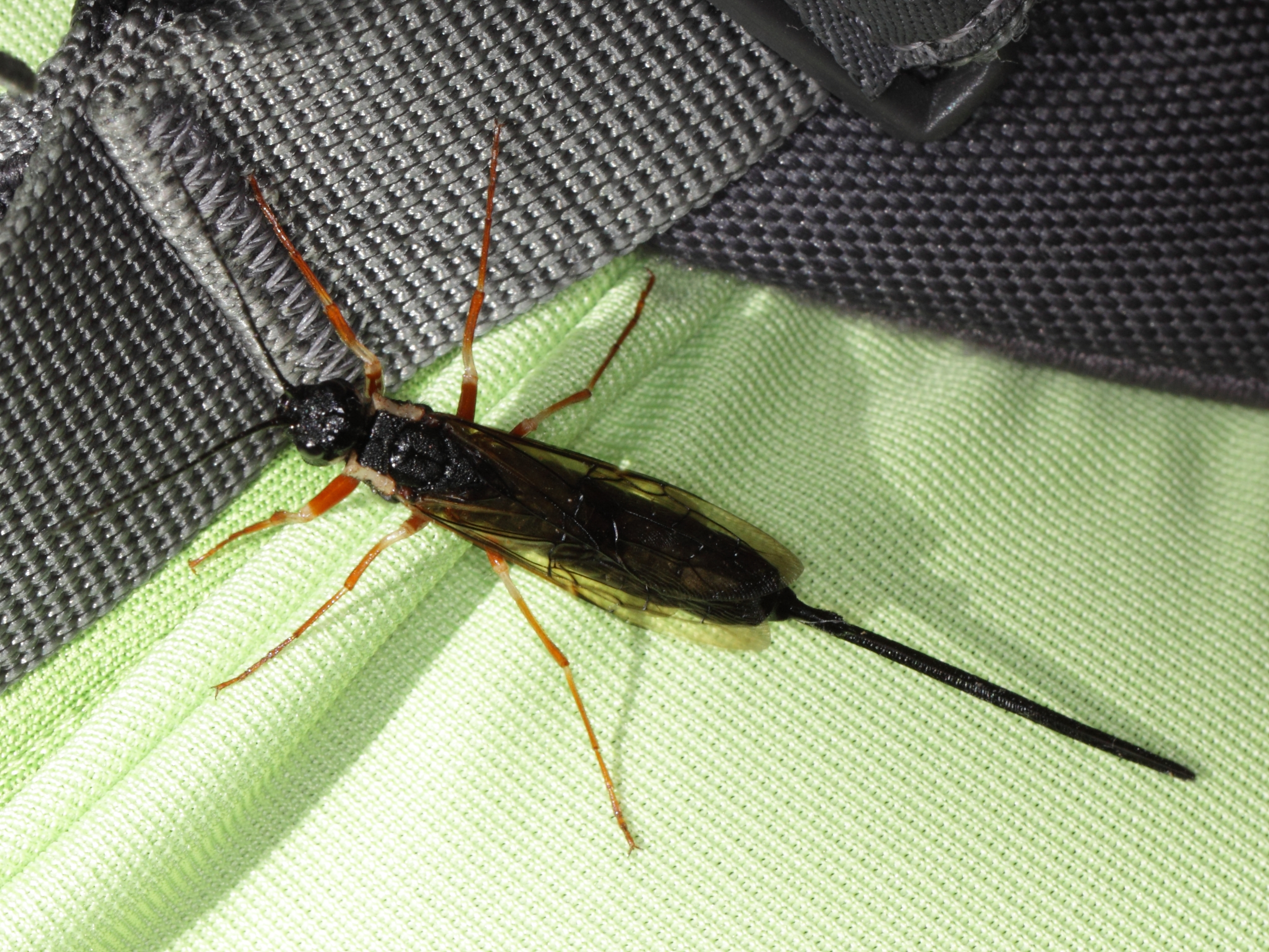

Scientific classification
- Kingdom: Animalia
- Phylum: Arthropoda
- Class: Insecta
- Order: Hymenoptera
- Family: Siricidae
- Genus: Xeris
- Species: X. spectrum

Binomial name
- Xeris spectrum (Linnaeus, 1758)

= Xeris spectrum =

Species of sawfly

Xeris spectrum is a kind of horntail or wood wasp, that lives in coniferous forests. It is large wasp with a powerful ovipositor in females. Unlike other Siricid Wood wasps, Xeris spectrum does not have symbiotic fungi to aid its larvae as they burrow in the wood of fir and other conifer trees making it unique in the Siricidae. It is widespread and is found in large parts of Europe, Asia, Africa and North America.

== Appearance ==
The body of Xeris spectrum is cylindrical. The head is broadest behind the eyes, and antennae are thread-shaped. Both sexes are equal in length, between 12 and 28 millimetres (0.47 and 1.10 in). The body is black or dark brown and shiny with white spots behind the eyes and on the sides of the prothorax. Xeris spectrum's legs are orange-red. Males have brown rings around the leg.

The body of the larvae is cylindrical and slightly flattened and is up to 25 millimetres (0.98 in) long. The pupa is 13 to 50 millimetres (0.51 to 1.97 in) in length. The antennae of the pupa extend beyond the wings at the level of the eighth segment.

== Behavior ==
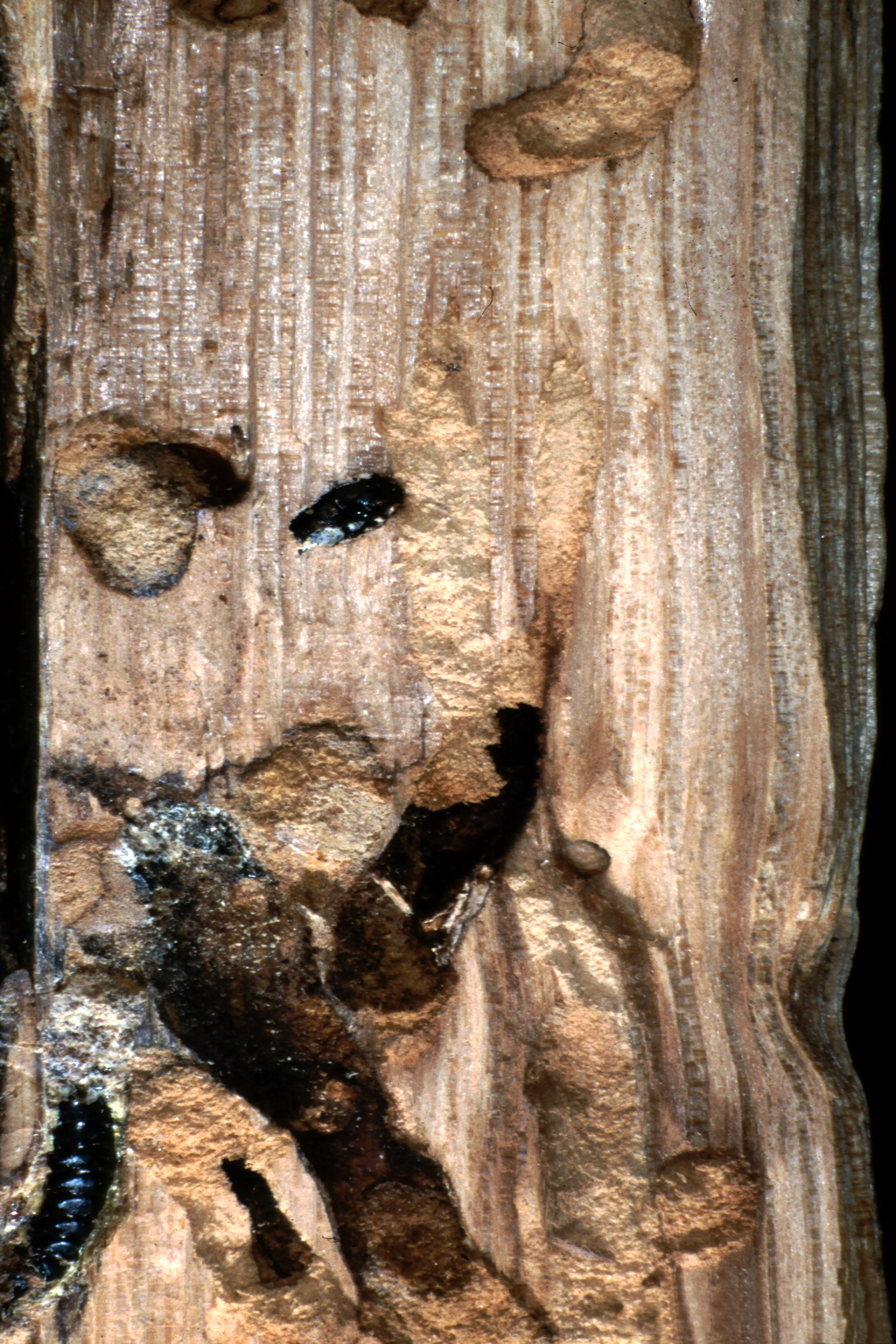
Damaged wood from Xeris spectrum galleries and pupal chambers

Xeris spectrum are found in open pine forests. Males often begin to fly a few days earlier than females. The females drill their ovipositors into the tree, just under the bark, and deposit their eggs. Females lay eggs in coniferous trees, usually spruce, pine and larch.

Although Xeris spectrum does not have any symbiotic fungi, it often takes advantage of the fungal symbionts of other wood wasp species. A study of the reproductive strategies of Xeris spectrum showed that the females often lay their eggs on wood where other wood wasps of species with symbiotic fungi have already laid their eggs. This allows the Xeris spectrum larvae to benefit from the fungi. In addition, adult Xeris spectrum emerge from their holes at two different times: one group emerges in summer with the species of other wood wasps, while the other group emerges the next spring.

The larvae are very different from the adults, both in lifestyle and appearance. The newly hatched larvae have access to food in the wood of damaged trees. As the larvae gnaw on the wood, the holes grow wider and deeper. Evidence of the larvae is noticeable in the deposits of wood chips and faeces that are left behind by the larvae. Just before the chrysalis stage larva boring a small chamber about 2 centimetres (0.79 in) into the tree.

Xeris spectrum belongs to the group of insects with complete metamorphosis (Holometabola), who undergoes a metamorphosis during development. Between the larval stage and the adult stage is the chrysalis stage, a rest period, in which wasps inner and outer bodies change. The larvae's pliable and soft body is transformed into a pupa with a hard shell. When the shell is hard starting transformation from larva to the adult. The internal organs are lost in varying degrees down to a cell mass. A reorganization takes place and the animal transformed. The length of the pupa phase varies according to temperature. The entire development from egg to adult takes several years.

== Damage ==
Xeris spectrum is considered to be a pest in the timber industry. The damage caused by the wasp damages the wood and decreases its value. Xeris spectrum is most prevalent in homogeneous stands of fir and mixed stands of fir and spruce that have been damaged by wind, fire, snow and pathogenic fungi. The density of the larvae can reach up to 60 specimens in 1 metre (3 ft 3 in) of tree stem.
