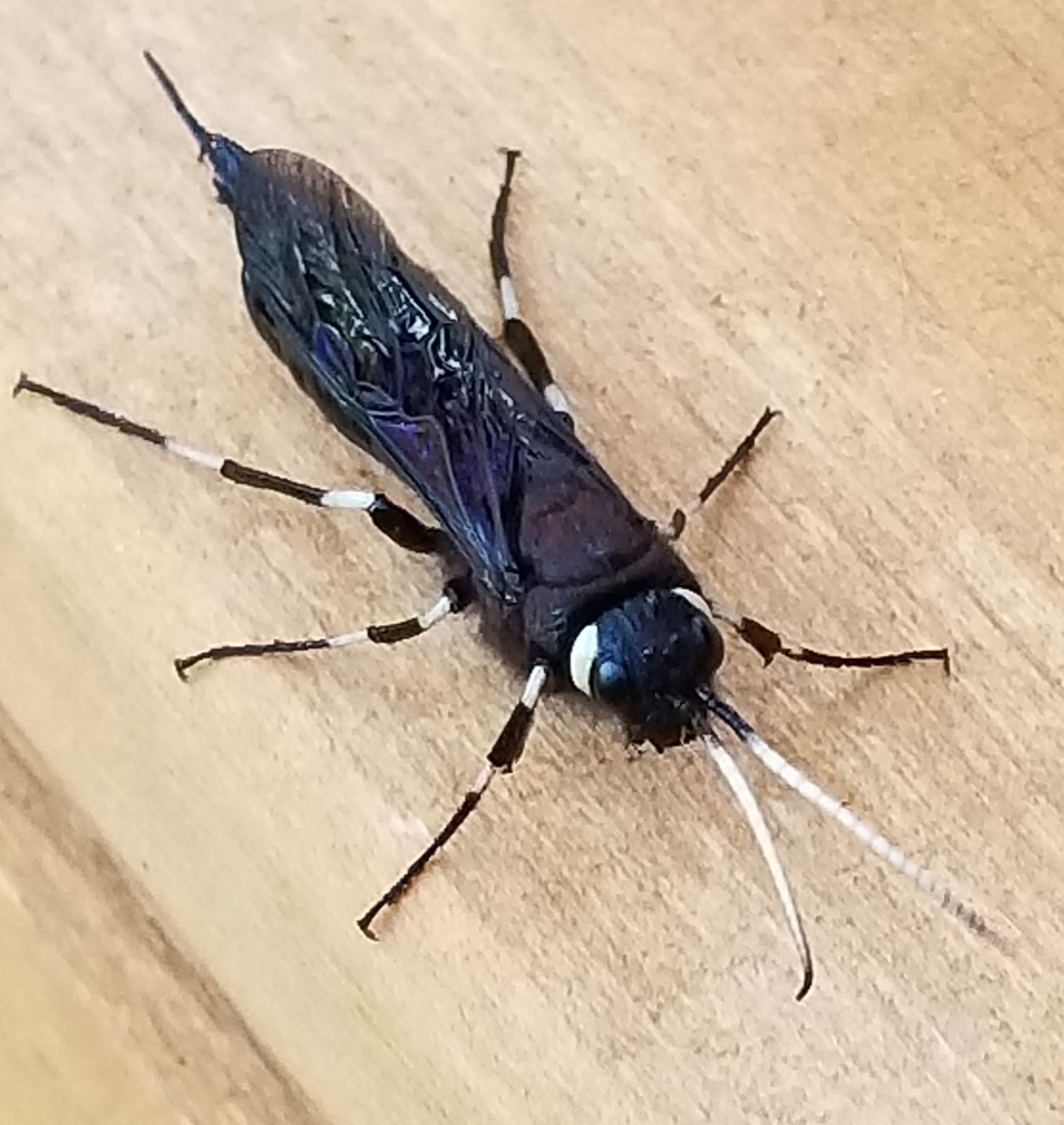

Scientific classification
- Kingdom: Animalia
- Phylum: Arthropoda
- Class: Insecta
- Order: Hymenoptera
- Family: Siricidae
- Genus: Urocerus
- Species: U. albicornis

Binomial name
- Urocerus albicornis (Fabricius, 1781)

= Urocerus albicornis =

Species of horntail insect

Urocerus albicornis (white-horned horntail) is a species of horntail native to North America. This species has occasionally been introduced into Europe and Japan.

It lives near conifer trees. It is black, with whiteish antennae, spots on either side of the head, and two bands on each leg.
