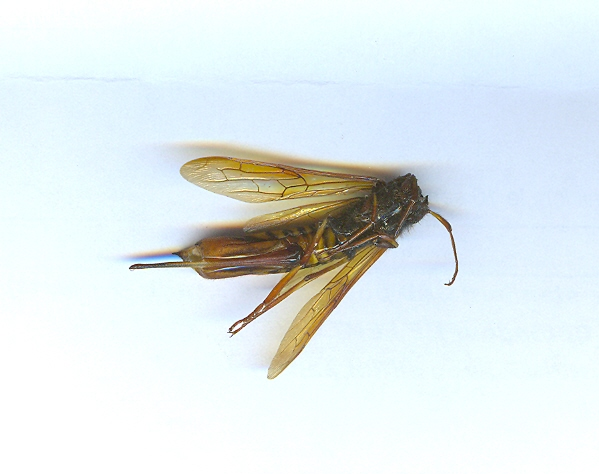

Scientific classification
- Kingdom: Animalia
- Phylum: Arthropoda
- Clade: Pancrustacea
- Class: Insecta
- Order: Hymenoptera
- Family: Siricidae
- Genus: Tremex
- Species: T. fuscicornis

Binomial name
- Tremex fuscicornis (Fabricius, 1787)

Synonyms
- Sirex camelogigas Christ; Sirex fuscicornis Fabricius; Sirex struthiocamelus Villers; Tremex juxicernis Walker; Urocerus fuscicornis Latreille; Xyloecematium fuscicornis Heyden; Xyloterus fuscicornis Boie; Tremex simulacrum Takeuchi

= Tremex fuscicornis =

Species of sawfly

Tremex fuscicornis (tremex wasp) is a species of horntail, native to Europe and Asia, and has been introduced to Australia, Canada and Chile.
