= Tremex magus =

Scientific classification
- Kingdom: Animalia
- Phylum: Arthropoda
- Clade: Pancrustacea
- Class: Insecta
- Order: Hymenoptera
- Family: Siricidae
- Genus: Tremex
- Species: T. magus

Binomial name
- Tremex magus Fabricius, 1787

Species of sawfly

Tremex magus is a species sawfly, native to most of Europe and parts of Russia.
