= Tremex alchymista =

Scientific classification
- Domain: Eukaryota
- Kingdom: Animalia
- Phylum: Arthropoda
- Class: Insecta
- Order: Hymenoptera
- Family: Siricidae
- Genus: Tremex
- Species: T. alchymista

Binomial name
- Tremex alchymista (Mocsary, 1886)

Species of sawfly

Tremex alchymista is a species of sawfly, native to Hungary and Romania.
