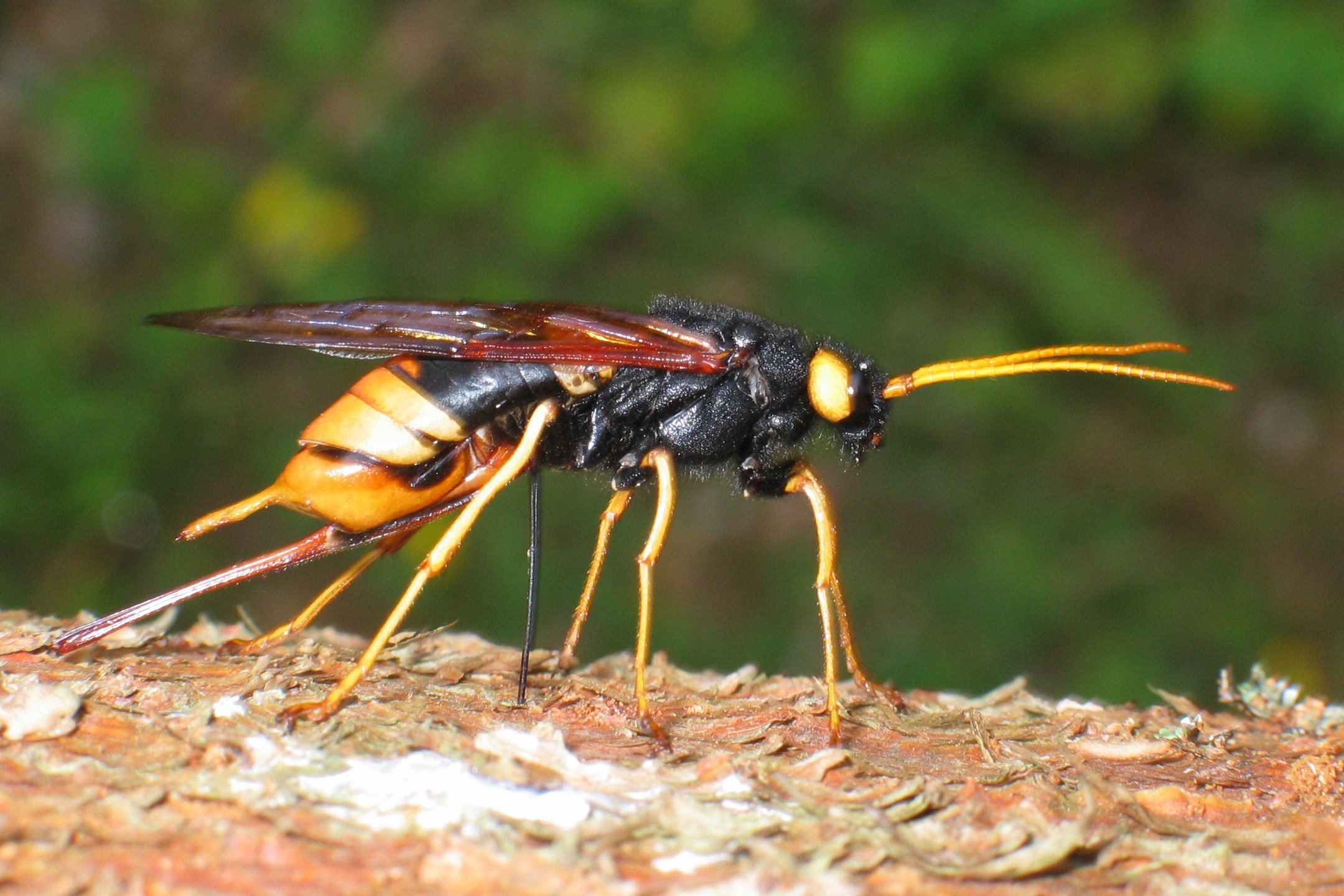
- Female ovipositing

Scientific classification
- Kingdom: Animalia
- Phylum: Arthropoda
- Clade: Pancrustacea
- Class: Insecta
- Order: Hymenoptera
- Family: Siricidae
- Genus: Urocerus
- Species: U. gigas

Binomial name
- Urocerus gigas Linnaeus, 1758

Synonyms
- Sirex gigas Linnaeus, 1758

= Urocerus gigas =

Species of insect

Urocerus gigas, the giant woodwasp, banded horntail, or greater horntail, is a species of sawfly native to the Palearctic realm and North Africa but also reside in North America since 2004 Though they are not wasps, their appearance resembles one due to mimicry. Adults are usually between 10 and 40 millimetres (1/2 and 1 1/2 inches) in length.

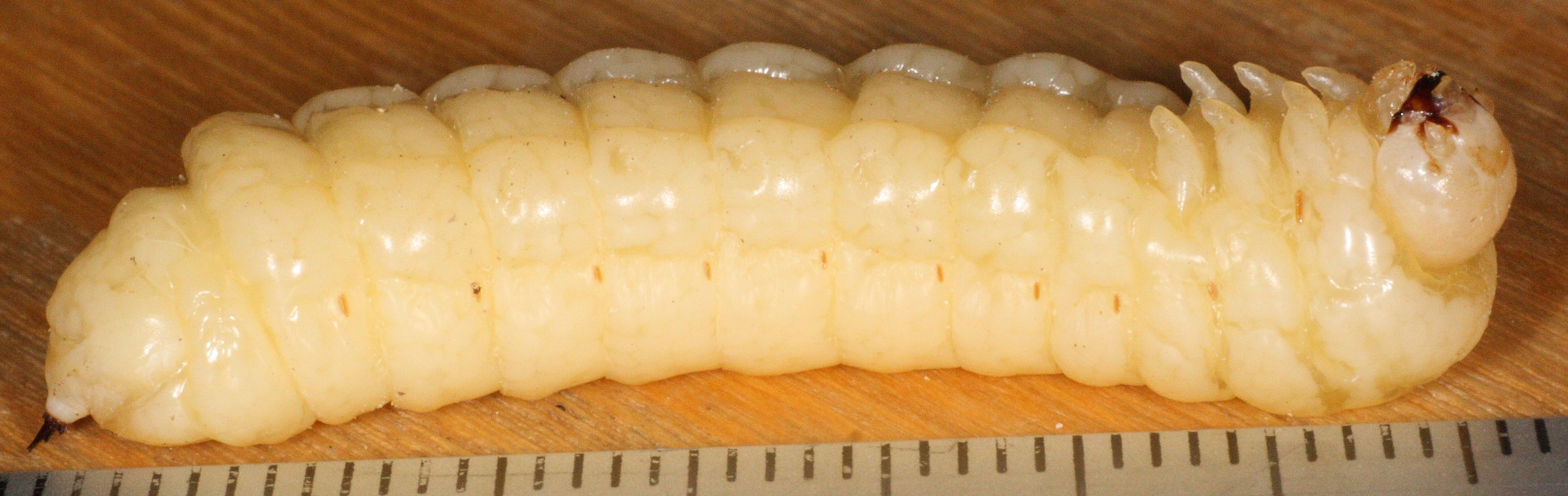
Larva

Subspecies:

- Urocerus gigas gigas
- Urocerus gigas taiganus

Urocerus gigas is a wood-boring insect that attacks softwoods of freshly felled logs/unhealthy trees. The species lives in discrete tunnels, frequently filled with hard-packed coarse fibrous frass, hard to dig out from tunnels. The tunnels are large, round and discrete, between 6 and 7 mm (1/4 and 9/32 in) in diameter. Both sexes have a chitinous spike emerging from the abdomen, derived from the last segment, which is found in all woodwasps. However, unlike in true wasps, the projection is harmless and the insect cannot sting.

The second, longer and lower projection in females only is the ovipositor. The ovipositor has saw-like teeth which she uses to drill a hole, and then deposit her eggs, into wood.

Urocerus flavicornis was once considered a subspecies of gigas but is now known to be a separate species.
