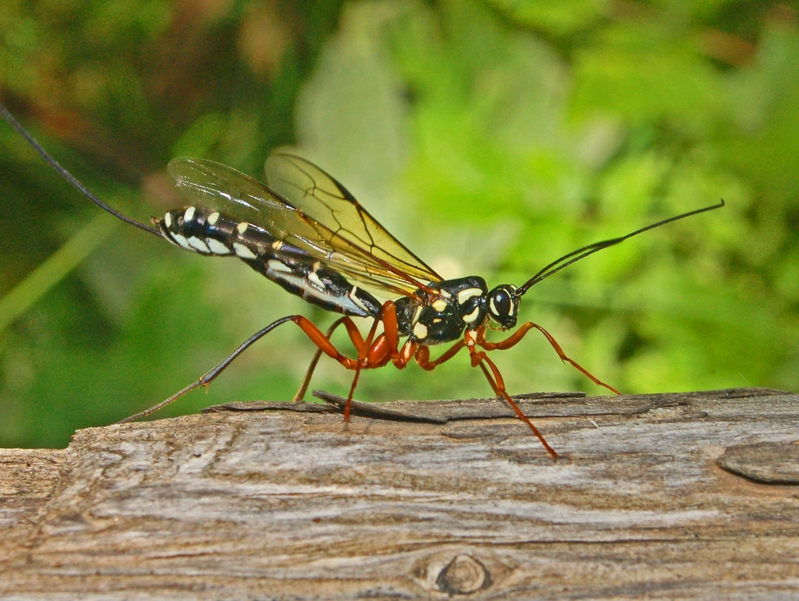
- Rhyssa persuasoria - Female

Scientific classification
- Kingdom: Animalia
- Phylum: Arthropoda
- Clade: Pancrustacea
- Class: Insecta
- Order: Hymenoptera
- Family: Ichneumonidae
- Subfamily: Rhyssinae
- Genus: Rhyssa; Gravenhorst, 1829

Synonyms
- Cryptocentrum Kirby, 1837; Pararhyssa Walsh, 1873

= Rhyssa =

Genus of insects

Rhyssa is a genus of ichneumon wasps belonging to the family Ichneumonidae subfamily Rhyssinae.

== Etymology ==
The Latin name of the genus comes from the Greek and means "wrinkled".

== Description ==
Female of this parasitic species drills deep into wood by its hair thin ovipositor (terebra) and lays its eggs on larvae living in timber, which become a food supply and an incubator for the progeny, until it is fully grown.

== Distribution ==
Species of this genus are present in most of Europe, the Australian region, the Near East, in the Nearctic realm, the Indomalayan realm, and in North Africa.

== Selected species ==
- Rhyssa alaskensis Ashmead, 1902
- Rhyssa amoena Gravenhorst, 1829
- Rhyssa crevieri Provancher, 1880
- Rhyssa curvipes Gravenhorst, 1829
- Rhyssa hoferi Rohwer, 1920
- Rhyssa howdenorum Townes, 1960
- Rhyssa kriechbaumeri Ozols, 1973
- Rhyssa lineolata Kirby, 1837
- Rhyssa nigricornis Ratzeburg, 1852
- Rhyssa nigritarsis
- Rhyssa persuasoria Linnaeus, 1758
- Rhyssa petiolata Brues, 1906
- Rhyssa ponderosae Townes 1960
