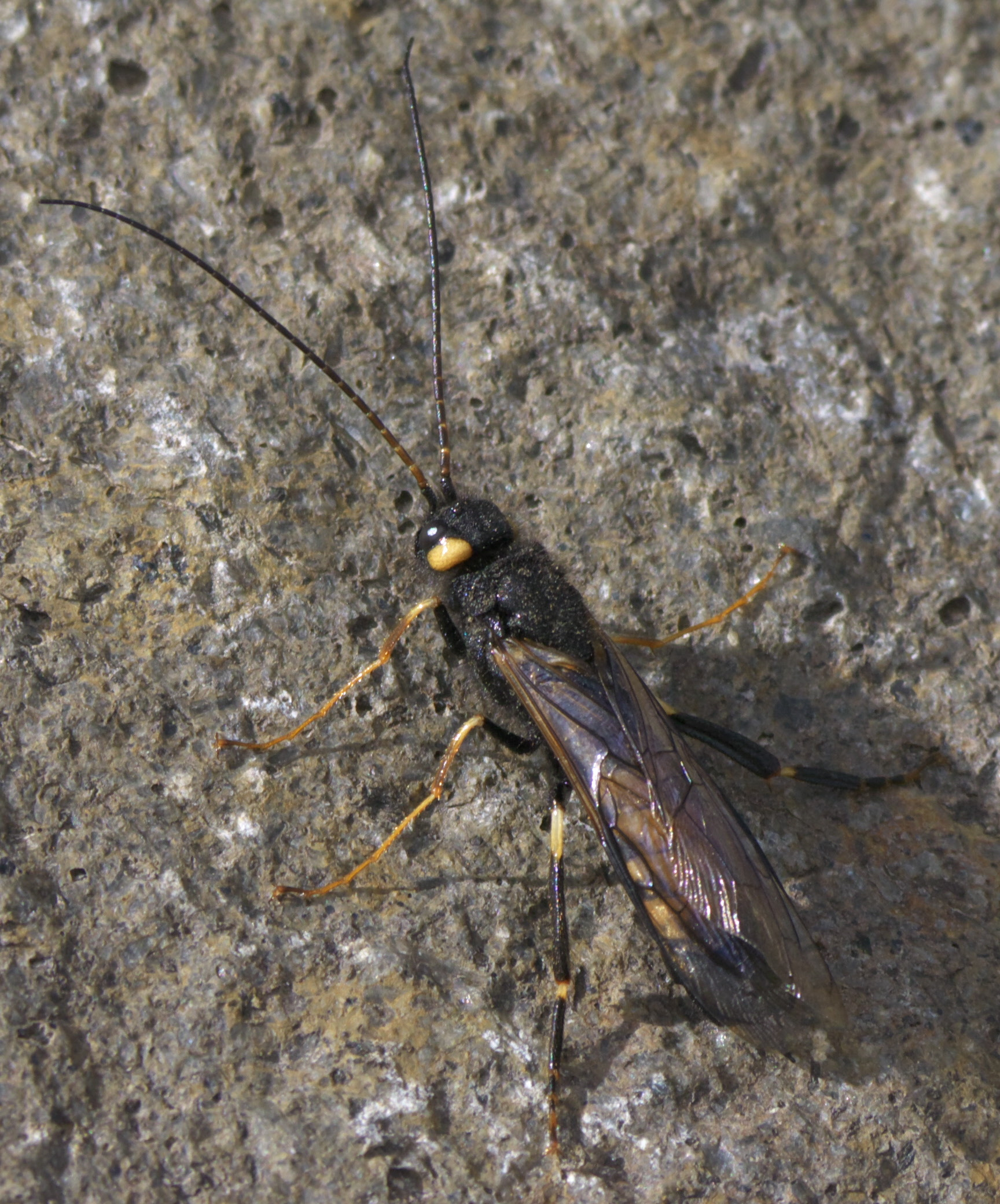
- Urocerus flavicornis

Scientific classification
- Kingdom: Animalia
- Phylum: Arthropoda
- Clade: Pancrustacea
- Class: Insecta
- Order: Hymenoptera
- Family: Siricidae
- Subfamily: Siricinae
- Genus: Urocerus; Geoffroy, 1762

= Urocerus =

Genus of sawflies

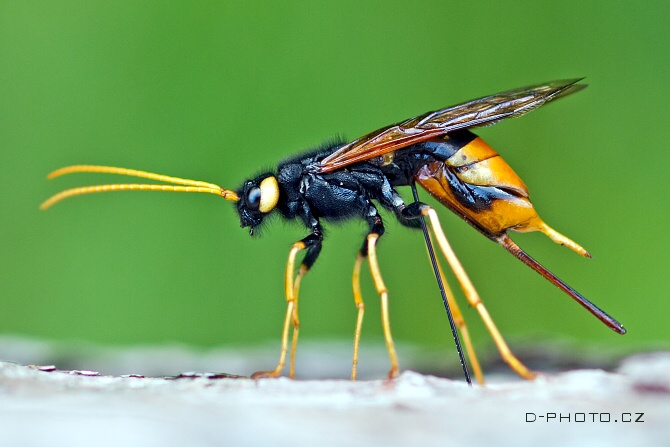
Urocerus gigas

Urocerus is a genus of horntails in the family Siricidae. There are about eight described species in Urocerus.

== Species ==
These species belong to the genus Urocerus:

- Urocerus albicornis (Fabricius, 1781)^{g b} (white horned horntail)
- Urocerus californicus Norton, 1869^{g b}
- Urocerus cressoni Norton, 1864^{g b} (black and red horntail)
- Urocerus flavicornis Fabricius, 1781^{g b} (yellow-horned horntail wasp)
- Urocerus franzinii C.Pesarini & F.Pesarini, 1977^{g}
- Urocerus gigas (Linnaeus, 1758)^{b} (giant woodwasp)
- Urocerus japonicus (Smith, 1874) (Japanese horntail)
- Urocerus sah (Mocsáry, 1881)^{g}

Data sources: i = ITIS, c = Catalogue of Life, g = GBIF, b = Bugguide.net
