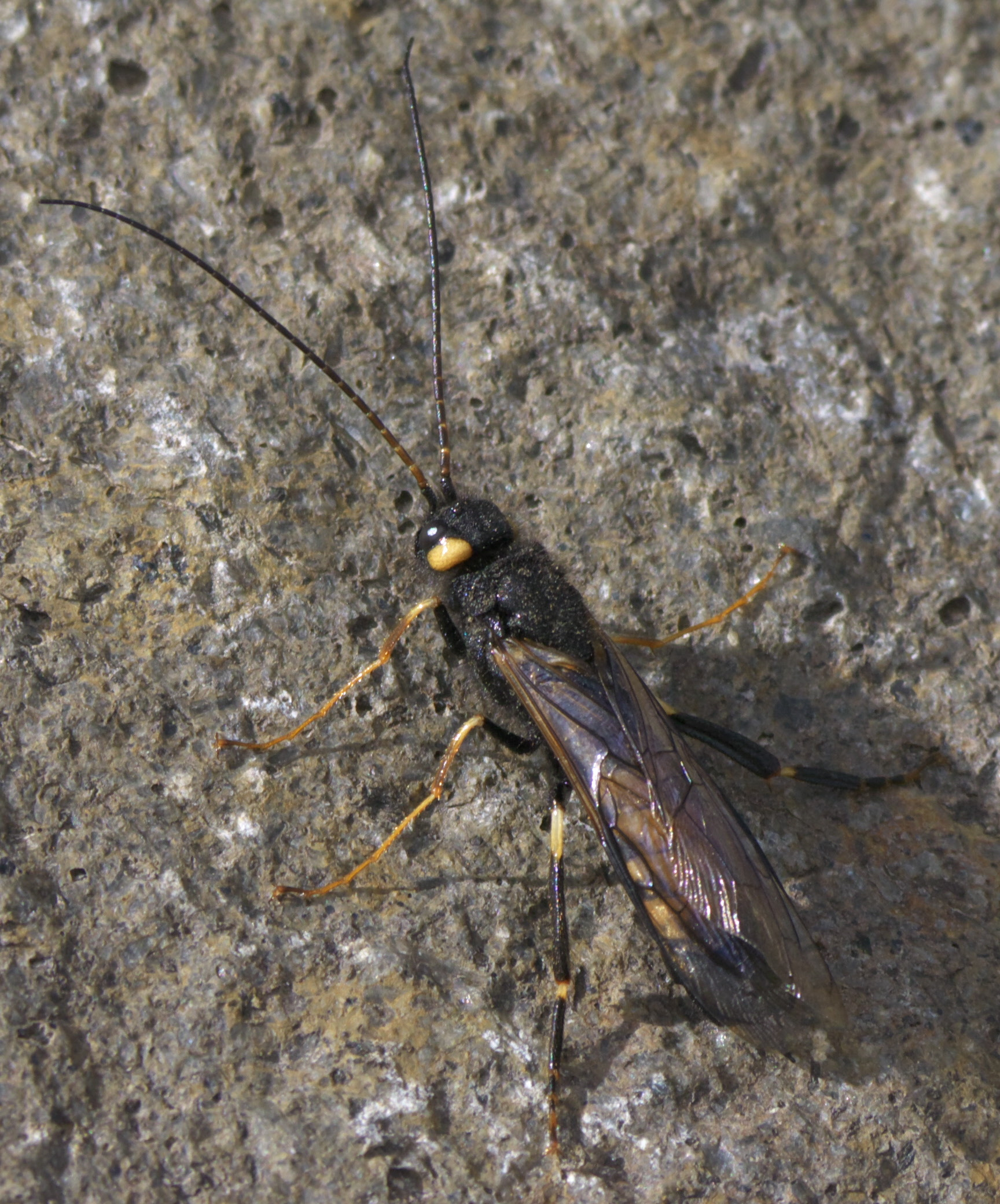

Scientific classification
- Domain: Eukaryota
- Kingdom: Animalia
- Phylum: Arthropoda
- Class: Insecta
- Order: Hymenoptera
- Family: Siricidae
- Genus: Urocerus
- Species: U. flavicornis

Binomial name
- Urocerus flavicornis (Fabricius, 1781)

= Urocerus flavicornis =

Species of horntail insect

Urocerus flavicornis, the yellow-horned horntail wasp, is a species of horntail native to North America.
