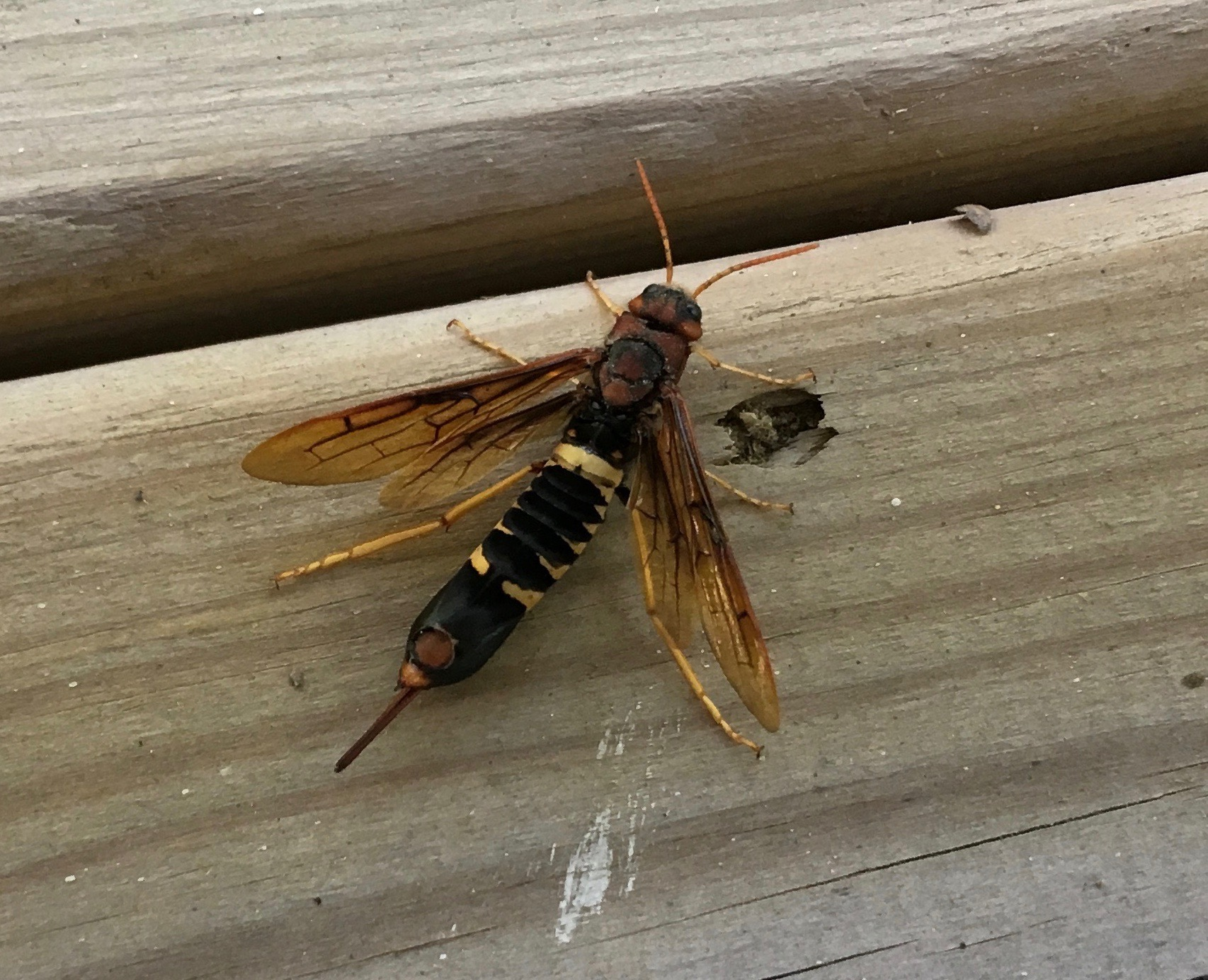
- Tremex columba

Scientific classification
- Domain: Eukaryota
- Kingdom: Animalia
- Phylum: Arthropoda
- Class: Insecta
- Order: Hymenoptera
- Family: Siricidae
- Genus: Tremex; Jurine, 1807

Species
- 33 worldwide; see text

= Tremex =

Genus of sawflies

Tremex is a genus of woodwasp in the Siricidae family. It has 33 species with a holarctic distribution. The larvae feed on hardwoods.

== Selected species ==
Tremex alchymista (Mocsary, 1886)
Tremex columba (Linnaeus, 1763)
Tremex fuscicornis (Fabricius, 1787)
Tremex magus (Fabricius, 1787)
