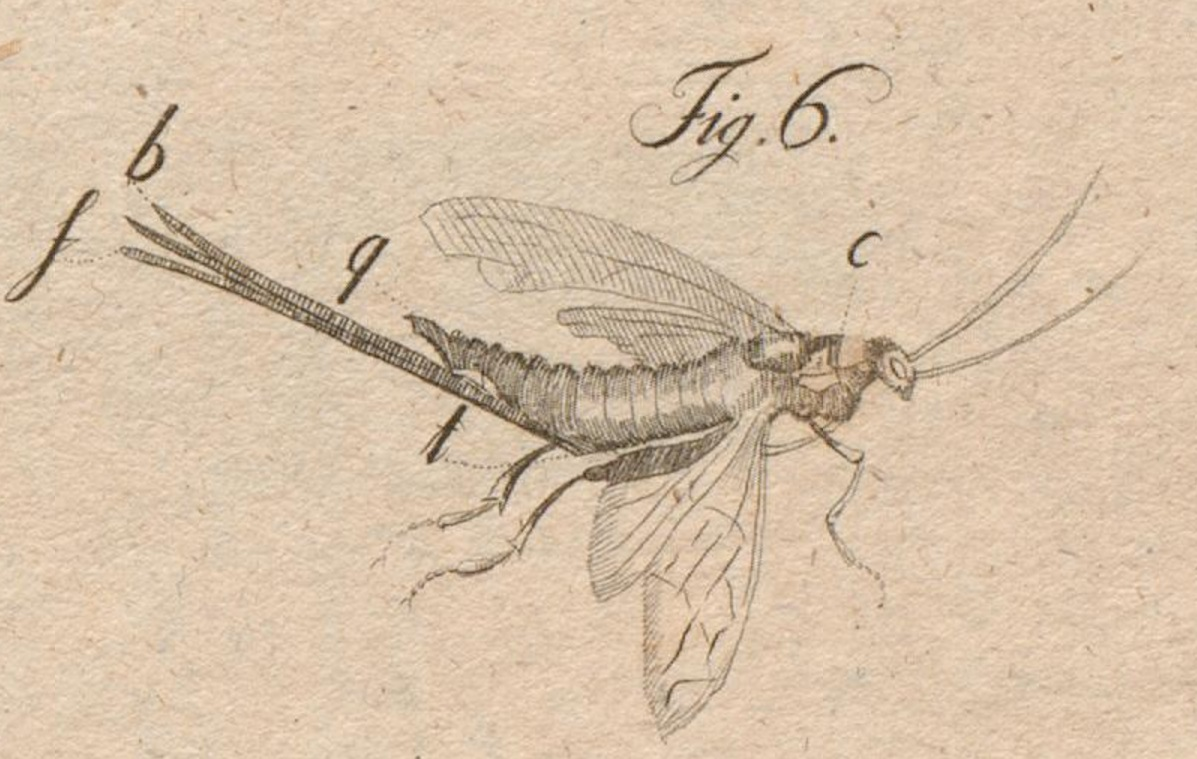
- Type species: X spectrum
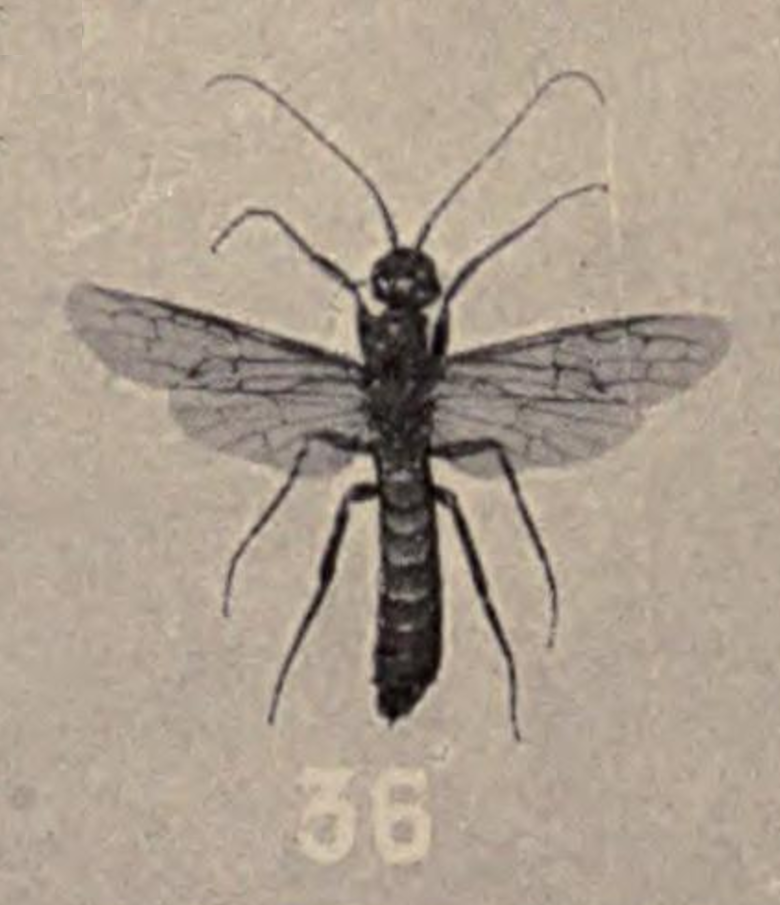
- X. morrisoni.

Scientific classification
- Domain: Eukaryota
- Kingdom: Animalia
- Phylum: Arthropoda
- Class: Insecta
- Order: Hymenoptera
- Family: Siricidae
- Genus: Xeris; A. Costa, 1894

Type species
- Ichneumon spectrum Linnaeus, 1758

Diversity
- 16 species

Synonyms
- Neoxeris Saini & Dingh, 1987

= Xeris =

Genus of sawflies

Xeris is a genus of horntails found in North America and Eurasia. Achille Costa circumscribed the genus in 1894.

== Synonyms ==
In 1987, Malkiat S. Saini and Devinder Singh circumscribed a new genus, Neoxeris upon their description of a new species, which they called Neoxeris melanocephala. In 2012, N. melanocephala was transferred to Xeris, making Neoxeris a junior synonym. X. melanocephalus was later synonymized with X. himalayensis.

== Description ==
Characteristic features of Xeris compared to other genera of Siricidae genera include: a hind wing with which lacks a cell cup, a small vertical ridge behind the eye, and a metatibial spur.

== Distribution ==
Xeris species are found in North America and Eurasia. In North America, they're found from the boreal forests in Alaska and Canada south through Chiapas in southern Mexico. They are found in temperate and boreal regions of Eurasia as well as mountains of southern Eurasia including Morocco, India, China, and Taiwan.

== Species ==
As of 2015, Xeris consists of sixteen species:

- Xeris caudatus (Cresson, 1865)
- Xeris chiricahua Smith, 2012
- Xeris cobosi Viedma & Suárez, 1961
- Xeris degrooti Goulet, 2015
- Xeris himalayensis Bradley, 1934
- Xeris indecisus (MacGillivray, 1893)
- Xeris malaisei Maa, 1949
- Xeris melancholicus (Westwood, 1874)
- Xeris morrisoni (Cresson, 1880)
- Xeris pallicoxae Goulet, 2015
- Xeris spectrum (Linnaeus, 1758)
- Xeris tarsalis (Cresson, 1880)
- Xeris tropicalis Goulet, 2012
- Xeris umbra Goulet, 2015
- Xeris xanthoceros Goulet, 2015
- Xeris xylocola Goulet, 2015
