= Afrotremex =

Scientific classification
- Kingdom: Animalia
- Phylum: Arthropoda
- Class: Insecta
- Order: Hymenoptera
- Family: Siricidae
- Genus: Afrotremex; Pasteels, 1951

Type species
- Tremex hyalinatus

Genus of horntails found in Africa

Afrotremex is a rare genus of horntails found in central and west Africa. The genus is thought to reside in tree canopies. Adults can be distinguished from closely related genera by three clearly outlined longitudinal bands of sculpture on the mesonotum, and by the clubbed setae on the clypeus, frons, and behind the eyes.

== Species ==
Currently there are 6 recognized species in Afrotremex.

- Afrotremex comatus Goulet, 2014
- Afrotremex hyalinatus (Mocsáry, 1891)
- Aftrotremex opacus Goulet, 2014
- Afrotremex pallipennis Goulet, 2014
- Afrotremex violaceus (Pasteels, 1951)
- Afrotremex xylophagus Goulet, 2014
