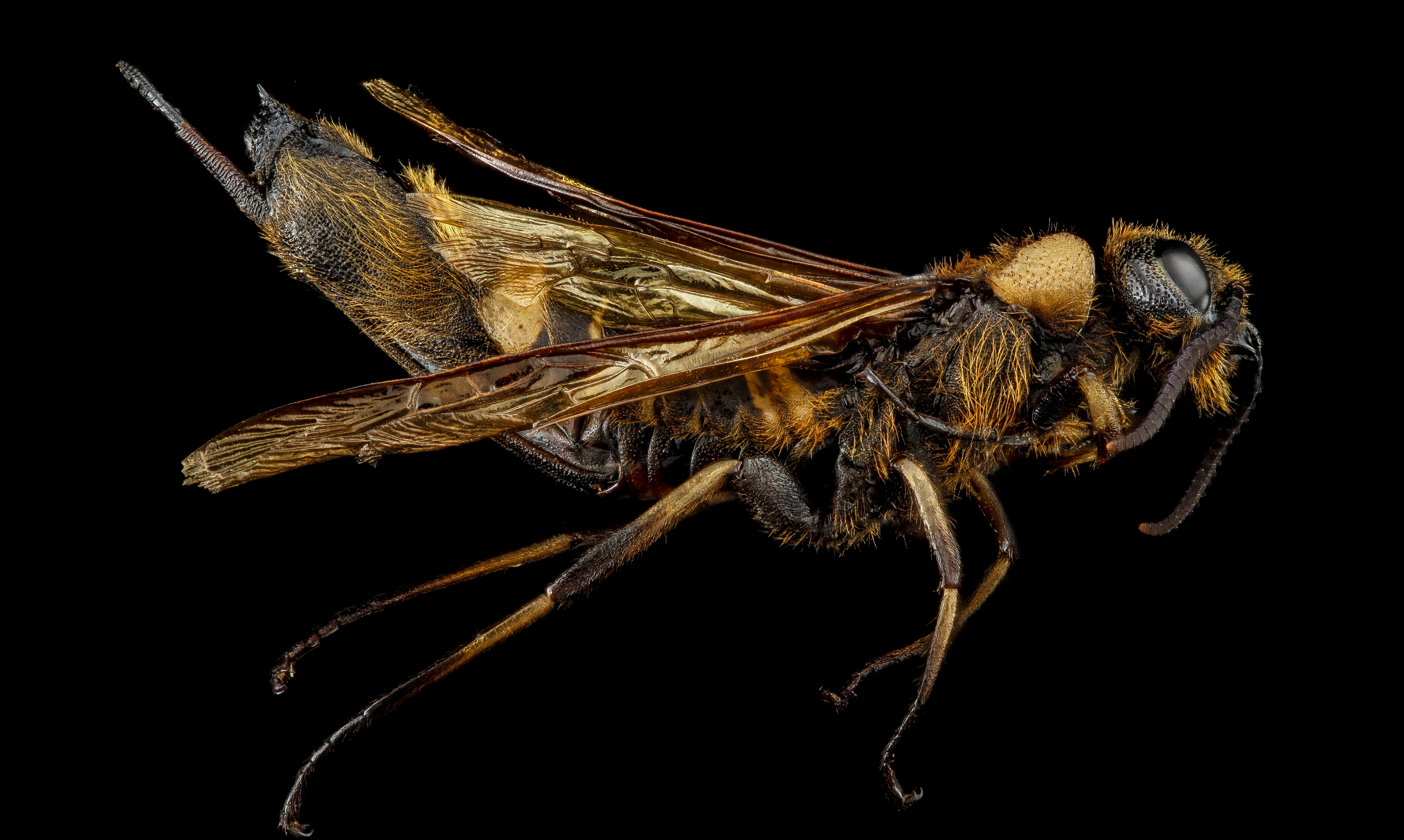
- Eriotremex formosanus, Blount County, Tennessee

Scientific classification
- Kingdom: Animalia
- Phylum: Arthropoda
- Clade: Pancrustacea
- Class: Insecta
- Order: Hymenoptera
- Superfamily: Siricoidea
- Family: Siricidae

Subfamilies and genera
- See text

= Horntail =

Family of sawflies

Horntails or wood wasps are any of the 150 non-social species of the hymenopteran family Siricidae, a type of wood-eating sawfly. The common name "horntail" derives from the stout, spine-like structure at the end of the adult's abdomen which is present in both sexes. The ovipositor in females is typically longer and also projects posteriorly, but it is not the source of the name. Though they are not true wasps, they are sometimes called wood wasps as the appearance of some species resembles one due to mimicry. A typical adult horntail is brown, blue, or black with yellow or red parts, and may often reach up to 4 cm (1.6 in) long. The pigeon horntail (Tremex columba) can grow up to 5 cm (2.0 in) long (not counting the ovipositor), among the longest of all Hymenoptera.

This family was formerly believed to be the sole living representative of the superfamily Siricoidea, a group well represented in Paleogene and Mesozoic times, but the family Anaxyelidae has been linked to this group as well. Siricidae has two subfamilies, Siricinae and Tremecinae. Siricinae infest needle-leaved trees and Tremecinae infest broad-leaved trees. There are ten living genera placed in the family, and an additional three genera described from fossils.

Female horntails lay their eggs in trees. The larvae bore into the wood and live in the tree for up to two years, possibly more. They typically migrate to just under the bark before pupation.

== Life cycle ==
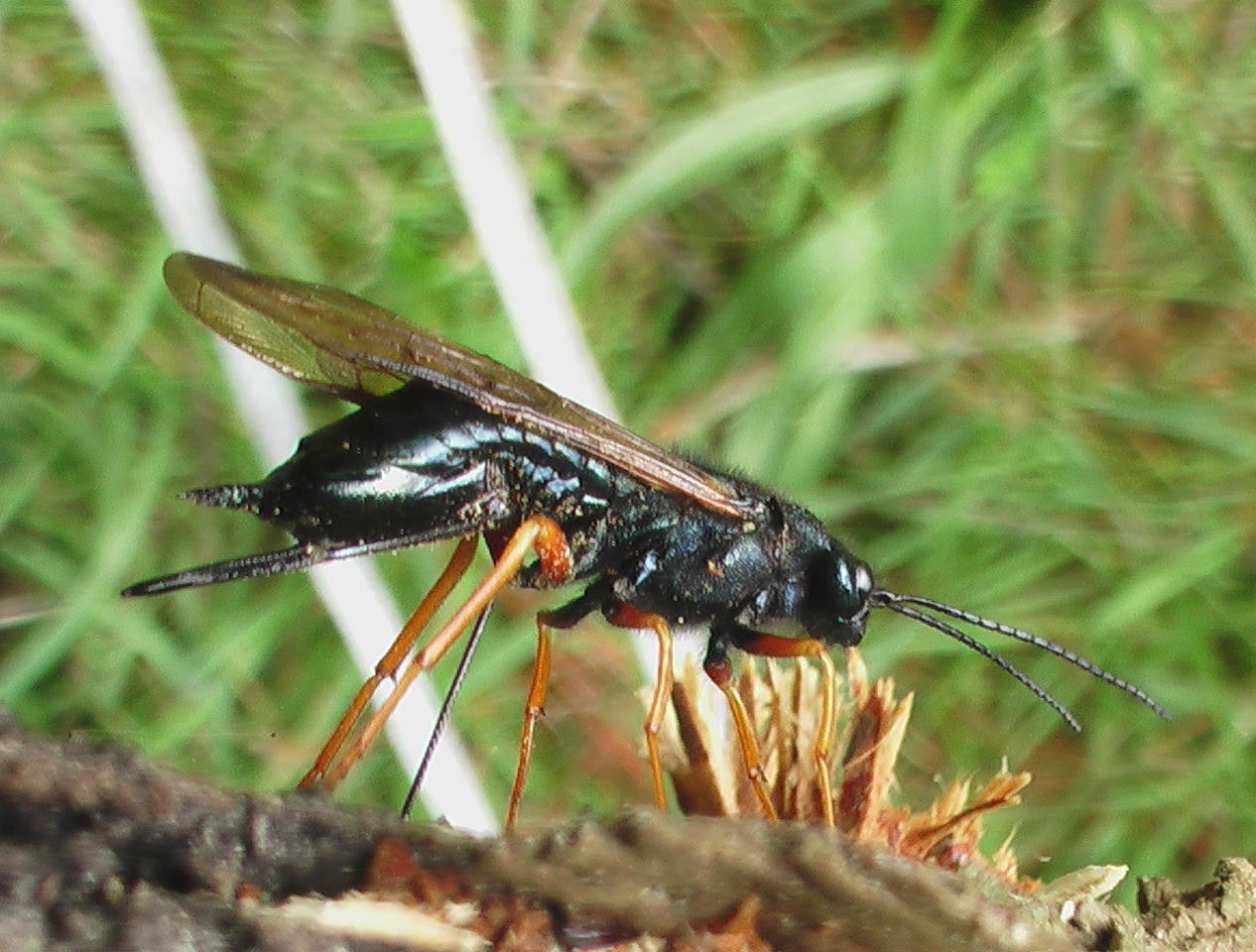
Sirex noctilio ("Sirex woodwasp") from New Zealand, on Pinus radiata. The spiral groove on the ovipositor is visible.

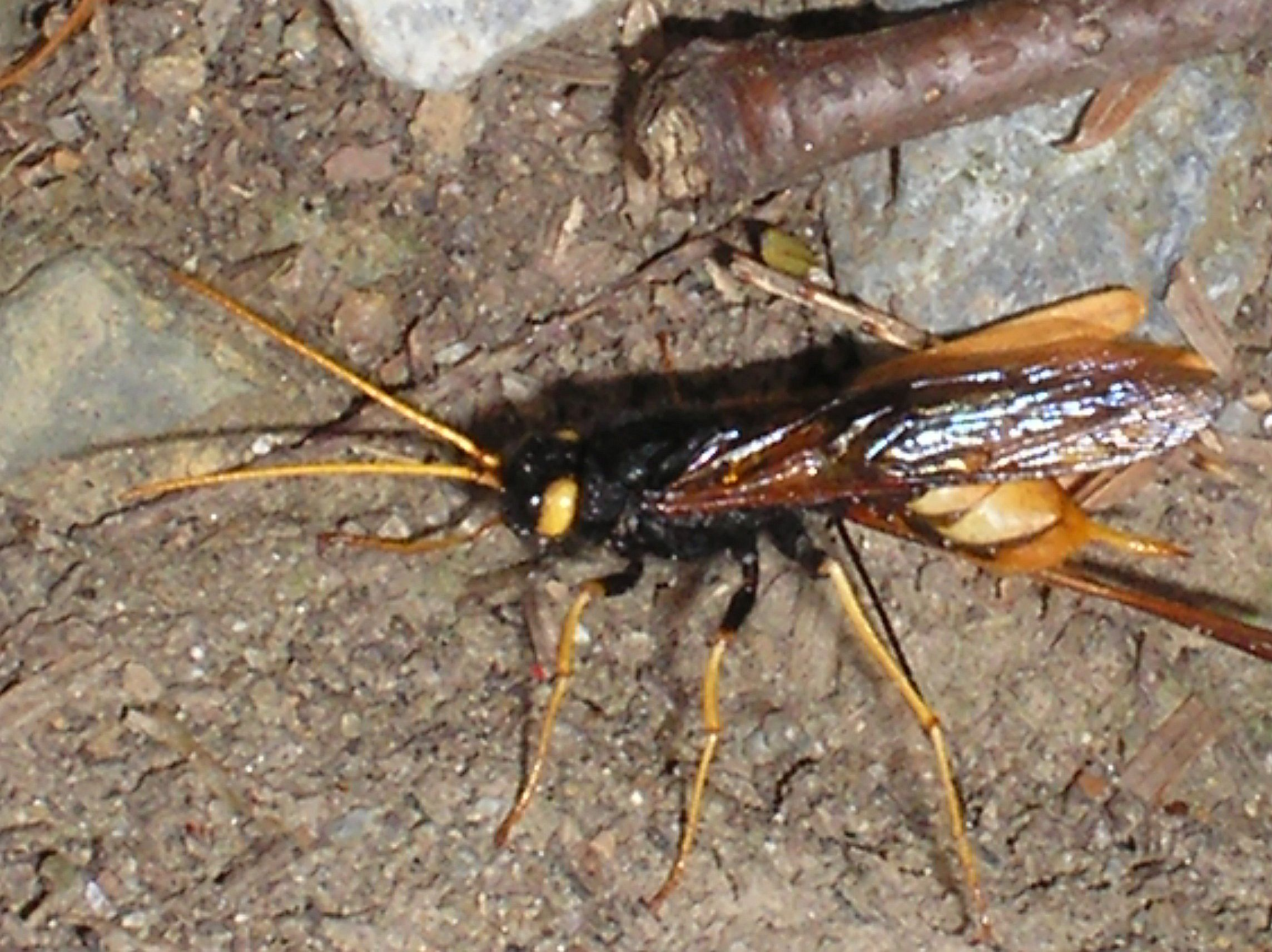
Giant horntail (Urocerus gigas)

Members of three genera of horntail attack dying or recently killed balsam fir and spruce. The female selects a log or unhealthy tree and settles down to bore a hole through the bark to reach the wood. The boring instrument is stiff and straight, but has a hinge that allows the female to bore perpendicular to her body axis. The insect does not push the boring tool into the wood, rather, two parts work against each other as described below. The female may make several holes before she finds wood that she considers suitable for her larva. She then lays an egg and repeats the process on other places of the same log or tree.

Once the egg hatches, the six-legged, whitish larva uses its jaws to begin excavating a long tunnel in which it will live until it is fully grown. Upon maturity, the larva will spin a silken cocoon and change into a pupa, but before this, the larva takes the precautionary measure of advancing the tunnel close to the inner bark, so that the mature, winged insect will not have to travel far through the wood and risk damaging its delicate wings, although there is a record of a Sirex-infested tree having been cut into rafters which were used in building a roof and covered with sheet-lead an eighth of an inch thick. One of the rafters contained a Sirex in either the larval or pupal stage; and when the adult insect sought its freedom, it found the way obstructed by the lead. It went right through, apparently finding lead not much more difficult to deal with than bark.

Populations increase rapidly only where brood material is abundant. The life cycle usually requires two years, and adults are usually in flight from late July to early September. Wood-rotting fungi found in horntail tunnels cause very rapid deterioration of the wood and quickly reduce opportunities for timber salvage.

The parasatoid ichneumon wasp Rhyssa persuasoria lays its eggs in the larvae of Sirex.

== Technological inspiration ==
The female wood wasp lays eggs inside trees, and its methods of doing so have inspired scientists to come up with new and safer surgical probes that they expect to be more efficient, specifically inspired by the ovipositor of Sirex noctilio.

The wood wasp ovipositor itself contains two interlocking valves. Each valve is covered with teeth that are backward-facing, with the teeth of one valve catching onto the wood to provide resistance, and the other valve moving forward and taking a slight step. The second valve then catches the wood to provide continued resistance as the first valve moves forward. Thus by quick oscillation, the valves alternate in providing resistance and moving forward, the process itself leads in the ovipositor drilling almost an inch into the sapwood with minimal force being applied and without the ovipositor buckling or breaking.

Researchers and scientists inspired by this system have created a prototype neurosurgical probe that works on the same principle. Its needle is made of silicon, with two oscillating valves that are covered with micron-sized teeth that too face backward. This enables it to penetrate deep into the brain causing little damage. According to the New Scientist magazine, "Unlike existing rigid surgical probes, the device will be flexible enough to move along the safest possible route, bypassing high-risk area of the brain during surgery, for example". A probe like this would considerably reduce the number of incisions necessary to access areas that are difficult to reach.

== Genera ==
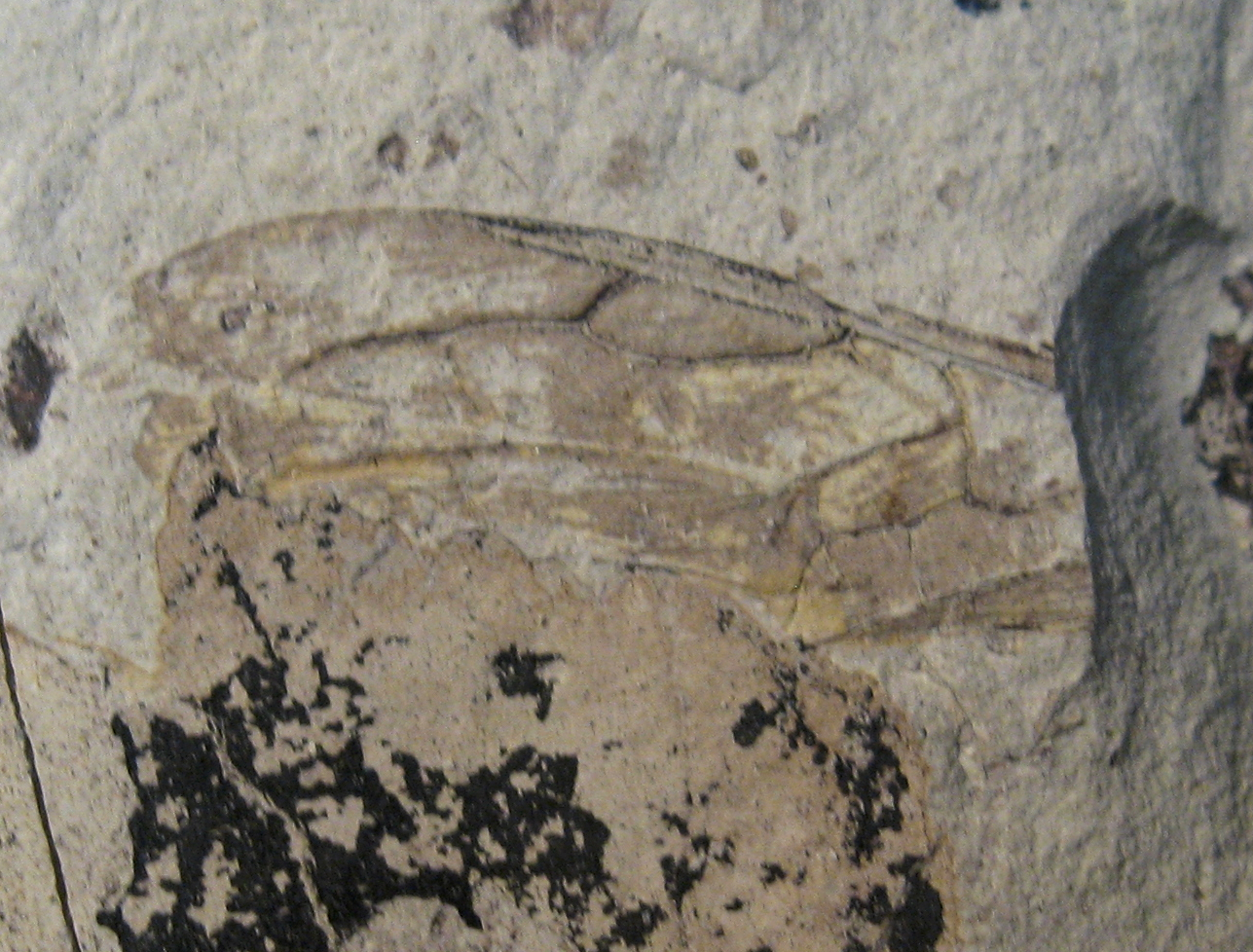
Eourocerus anguliterreus holotype fore-wing (counterpart). Ypresian Klondike Mountain Formation

These genera belong to the family Siricidae

- Afrotremex Pasteels, 1951
- Eriotremex Benson, 1943
- Sirex Linnaeus, 1760
- Siricosoma Forsius, 1933
- Sirotremex Smith, 1988
- Teredon Norton, 1869
- Tremex Jurine, 1807
- Urocerus Geoffroy, 1762
- Xeris Costa, 1894
- Xoanon Semenov-Tian-Shanskii, 1921

These extinct genera have been referred to the family as well:

- †Aulisca Rasnitsyn, 1968
- †Cratosirex Jouault, Pouillon & Nel, 2020
- †Cretosirex Wang, Rasnitsyn, Han & Ren, 2018
- †Emanrisca Rasnitsyn, 1993
- †Eoteredon Archibald, Aase & Nel, 2021
- †Eourocerus Archibald & Rasnitsyn, 2022
- †Eoxeris Maa, 1949
- †Gigasirex Rasnitsyn, 1968
- †Liasirex Rasnitsyn, 1968
- †Megaulisca Rasnitsyn, 1968
- †Megura Rasnitsyn, 1968
- †Pararchexyela Rasnitsyn, 1968
- †Proximoxeris Nel, 1991
- †Urocerites Heer, 1867
- †Ypresiosirex Archibald & Rasnitsyn, 2015
